= Lands inhabited by Indigenous peoples =

Territories occupied primarily by native or tribal peoples

The lands inhabited by indigenous peoples receive different treatments around the world. Many countries have specific legislation, definitions, nomenclature, objectives, etc., for such lands. To protect indigenous land rights, special rules are sometimes created to protect the areas they live in. In other cases, governments establish "reserves" with the intention of segregation. Some indigenous peoples live in places where their right to land is not recognised, or not effectively protected.

== By country ==
=== In Australia ===
- Indigenous Protected Areas
- Torres Strait Regional Authority (de facto autonomous region)
- Northern Peninsula Area Region
- Indigenous Local government areas (LGA) of Queensland
  - Wujal Wujal Aboriginal Shire
  - Aboriginal Shire of Cherbourg
  - Aboriginal Shire of Woorabinda
  - Aboriginal Shire of Palm Island
  - Aboriginal Shire of Hope Vale
  - Aboriginal Shire of Kowanyama
  - Aboriginal Shire of Lockhart River
  - Aboriginal Shire of Mapoon
  - Aboriginal Shire of Napranum
  - Aboriginal Shire of Pormpuraaw
  - Aboriginal Shire of Yarrabah
  - Aboriginal Shire of Doomadgee
- Aboriginal land councils in the Northern Territory
  - Anindilyakawa Land Council
  - Central Land Council
  - Northern Land Council
  - Tiwi Land Council
  - Bagot Aboriginal Community(Bagot Aboriginal Reserve)

=== In Bangladesh ===
- Chittagong Hill Tracts
  - Bohmong Circle
  - Chakma Circle
  - Mong Circle

=== In Belize ===
- Aguacate Indian Reservation, Toledo
- Black Creek Indian Reservation, Toledo
- Blue Creek Indian Reservation, Toledo
- Crique Sarco Indian Reservation, Toledo
- Graham Creek Indian Reservation, Toledo
- Hinchasones Indian Reservation, Toledo
- Machaca Indian Reservation, Toledo
- Xpicilha Indian Reservation, Toledo

=== In Bolivia ===
es:Autonomía indígena originario campesina

- Native Community Lands

TCO	Location	Size (hectares)	Date Established	Established by	Indigenous Peoples	Previous Status
Sirionó Indigenous Territory		52,408.71 ha	24 September 1990	Supreme Decree 22609	Sirionó	
Isiboro Sécure National Park and Indigenous Territory	Cochabamba/Beni Department border	1,372,180 ha	24 September 1990	Supreme Decree 22610	Trinitario Mojeño, Yuracaré, Chimán	National Park (since 1965)
Multiethnic Indigenous Territory I	Beni	365,483.26 ha	24 September 1990	Supreme Decree 22611	Trinitario Mojeño, Ignaciano Mojeño, Movima, Yuracaré, Chimán	
Chimán Indigenous Territory I	Beni	337,360.44 ha	24 September 1990			
Pilón Lajas Biosphere Reserve and Communal Lands	Yungas region, northern La Paz Department and Beni	400,000 ha	9 April 1992	Supreme Decree 23110	Mosetén, Tsimané, Tacana	Biosphere Reserve (since 1977)
Chayantaka Native Community Lands	north Potosí	36,366.79	July 2005	INRA titling completed	Chayantaka ayllu	
Lomerío Chiquitano Indigenous Territory		259,188	9 April 1992; June 2006	Supreme Decree 23112; INRA Titling Complete	Chiquitano	
Monte Verde Chiquitano Indigenous Territory	Ñuflo de Chávez Province, Santa Cruz	947,440.8	3 July 2007	Titling completed and awarded	Chiquitano	
Araona Indigenous Territory			9 April 1992	Supreme Decree 23108		
Yuki Indigenous Territory	Cochabamba		9 April 1992	Supreme Decree 23111	Yuki, Yuracaré	
Yuracaré Native Community Lands	Cochabamba				Yuracaré	
Avatiri Ingre Native Community Lands	Chuquisaca				Guaraní	
Avatiri Huacareta Native Community Lands	Chuquisaca				Guaraní	
Avatiri Ingre Native Community Lands	Chuquisaca				Guaraní	
Machareti-Ñancaroinza-Carandayti Native Community Lands	Chuquisaca				Guaraní	
Itikaraparirenda Native Community Lands	Chuquisaca				Guaraní	
Alto Parapetí Native Community Lands	Santa Cruz				Guaraní	Ranches with Guaraní in conditions of servitude
Nor Lípez Native Community Lands	Nor Lípez Province, Potosí	2,000,291	19 April 2011	INRA titling completed	Central Única Provincial de Comunidades Originarias de Nor Lípez	
Jatun Ayllu-Juchuy Ayllu-Chaupi Ayllu Native Community Lands	Sur Lípez Province, Potosí	1,557,532	19 April 2011	INRA titling completed	Jatun Ayllu, Juchuy Ayllu, Chaupi Ayllu indigenous communities	
Enrique Baldivieso Native Community Lands	Enrique Baldivieso Province, Potosí	227,003	19 April 2011	INRA titling completed	Central Única de la Provincia de Comunidades Originarias Enrique Baldivieso	

=== In Botswana ===
- New Xade, a village established as an indigenous reservation for Khoe-speaking San (Bushmen) ethnic groups and other first peoples relocated from their traditional lands on the Central Kalahari Game Reserve (CKGR).The primary ethnic groups residing in the settlement are the G/ui (Dcuikhoe), G//ana (Dxanakhoe), and Bakgalagadi.
- Kaudwane, another village established as an indigenous reservation for indigenous San ethnic groups relocated from the Central Kalahari Game Reserve.
  - A smaller number of indigenous San peoples were also relocated to the villages of Bere, Chobokwane and New Xanagas

=== In Brazil ===
- Terras Indígenas, in the wide sense
  - Terras indígenas, in the strict sense
  - Terras reservadas (reserva indígena, parque indígena, colônia agrícola indígena e território federal indígena)
  - Terras dominiais

=== In Canada ===
- Inuit Nunangat
  - Nunavut, a federal territory open to non-natives but Inuit-majority
  - Inuvialuit Settlement Region, established by the federal government and lying within Yukon and the Northwest Territories, co-managed with the Inuvialuit
  - Nunavik (Kativik Regional Government), Quebec
  - Nunatsiavut, Newfoundland and Labrador
- Unique to each province:
  - Indian reserves, or First Nations reserves (Canada-wide)
  - Aboriginal villages and territories of Quebec
    - Eeyou Istchee
    - Kanesatake, Kahnewake, Doncaster and Akwesasne
    - Kawawachikamach, Quebec
  - Regional councils and community governments of the Northwest Territories
    - Akaitcho Territory Government
    - Dehcho First Nations
    - Gwich'in Tribal Council
    - Inuvialuit Regional Corporation
    - Northwest Territory Métis Nation
    - Sahtu Dene Council
    - Tłįchǫ Government
    - Three First Nations reserves
      - Acho Dene Koe First Nation, Hay River Reserve and Salt River Reserve
  - First Nations reserves, tribal councils, First Nations governments and Indian government districts in British Columbia
    - Nisga'a First Nation
    - Tla'amin First Nation
    - Maa-nulth First Nation
    - Secehtl Indian Band
    - Westbank First Nation
    - Tsawwassen First Nation
  - First Nation reserves and tribal self-government/land claim agreements of the Yukon
    - Carcross/Tagish First Nation
    - Champagne and Aishihik First Nations
    - First Nation of Na-Cho Nyak Dun
    - Kluane First Nation
    - Kwanlin Dün First Nation
    - Little Salmon/Carmacks First Nation
    - Selkirk First Nation
    - Ta'an Kwach'an Council
    - Teslin Tlingit Council
    - Trʼondëk Hwëchʼin First Nation
    - Vuntut Gwitchin First Nation
  - Manitoba has 63 Indian reserves, 14 urban reserves and 7 tribal councils
    - Dakota Ojibway Tribal Council
    - Interlake Reserves Tribal Council
    - Island Lake Tribal Council
    - Keewatin Tribal Council
    - Southeast Resource Development Council
    - Swampy Cree Tribal Council
    - West Region Tribal Council
  - Alberta
    - 48 First Nations reserves
    - 6 Indian settlements
    - 8 Métis Settlements
    - 10 tribal councils
      - Athabasca Tribal Council
      - Blackfoot Confederacy
      - Confederacy of Treaty 6 First Nations
      - Kee Tas Kee Now Tribal Council
      - Lesser Slave Lake Indian Regional Council
      - North Peace Tribal Council
      - Stoney Nakoda - Tsuut'ina Tribal Council
      - Tribal Chiefs Ventures
      - Western Cree Tribal Council
      - Yellowhead Tribal Council

=== In Central African Republic ===
- Dzanga-Sangha Special Reserve, a forest reserve established to protect wildlife and the indigenous Baka Pygmies communities of Bayanga, Moussapoula, Kunda, Papaye and Yobe.

=== In China ===
- Autonomous administrative divisions of China
  - Tibet Autonomous Region (Xizang Autonomous Region)
  - Xinjiang Uygur Autonomous Region (XUAR)
  - Ningxia Hui Autonomous Region (NHAR)
  - Inner Mongolia Autonomous Region
  - Guangxi Zhuang Autonomous Region (GZAR)
  - 30 Autonomous prefectures
  - 117 Autonomous counties
  - 3 Autonomous banners

=== In Colombia ===
- Indigenous reserves in Colombia
- Territorios indígenas
- Resguardo indígena

=== In Costa Rica ===
- Indigenous territories of Costa Rica
  - Boruca Indian Reservation
  - Guaymi Indian Reservation
  - Horse Treks and Guayami Indian Reservation

=== In Denmark ===
- Kalaallit Nunaat, an autonomous territory

=== In Dominica ===
- Carib Territory

=== In Finland and Scandinavia ===
- Sámi Domicile Area
- Sápmi

=== In French Guiana ===
There are traditional use areas.

=== In Guyana ===
- Epira Amerindian District (East Berbice-Corentyne Area)
- Epira Amerindian Reservation (East Berbice-Corentyne Area)
- Kanuku Amerindian District (Upper Takutu-Upper Essequibo Area)
- Karasabai Amerindian District (Upper Takutu-Upper Essequibo Area)
- Orealla Amerindian District (East Berbice-Corentyne Area)
- Orealla Amerindian Reservation (East Berbice-Corentyne Area)
- Pomeroon-Ituribisi Amerindian District (Pomeroon-Supenaam Area)
- Pomeroon-Ituribisi Indian Reservation (Pomeroon-Supenaam Area)
- Pomeroon-Ituribisi Reservation (Pomeroon-Supenaam Area)
- Saint Francis Amerindian District (Guyana Area)
- Santa Amerindian District (Essequibo Islands-West Demerara Area)
- Wikki Amerindian District (Upper Demerara-Berbice Area)
- Wikki Amerindian Reservation (Upper Demerara-Berbice Area)
- Wikki Indian Reservation (Upper Demerara-Berbice Area)

=== In Hong Kong ===
- Indigenous villages of the New Territories, there are 586 villages recognized as indigenous by the Small House Policy which are represented by 27 rural committees. The largest indigenous group is the Hakka followed by Tanka, Hoklo and Weitou peoples.
  - Cheung Chau Rural Committee
  - Fanling District Rural Committee
  - Ha Tsuen Rural Committee
  - Hang Hau Rural Committee
  - Lamma Island (North) Rural Committee
  - Lamma Island (South) Rural Committee
  - Kam Tin Rural Committee
  - Ma Wan Rural Committee
  - Mui Wo Rural Committee
  - Pat Heung Rural Committee
  - Peng Chau Rural Committee
  - Ping Shan Rural Committee
  - Sai Kung North Rural Committee
  - Sai Kung Rural Committee
  - San Tin Rural Committee
  - Sha Tau Kok District Rural Committee
  - Sha Tin Rural Committee
  - Shap Pat Heung Rural Committee
  - Sheung Shui District Rural Committee
  - South Lantao Rural Committee
  - Ta Kwu Ling District Rural Committee
  - Tai O Rural Committee
  - Tai Po Rural Committee
  - Tsing Yi Rural Committee
  - Tuen Mun Rural Committee
  - Tung Chung Rural Committee
  - Tsuen Wan Rural Committee
- Frontier Closed Area, a restricted border zone in Hong Kong on the border with Mainland China populated by a number of indigenous Hakka villages.Since non-residents require a special Closed Area Permit to enter the FCA, the area effectively functions as a protected indigenous reservation for the Hakka and Tanka inhabitants.
  - Lok Ma Chau
  - Ta Kwu Leng
  - Sha Tau Kok
  - Chung Ying Street District

=== In India ===
- Adivasi and India tribal belt
- 29 Autonomous district councils
  - Bodoland Territorial Council
  - North Cachar Hills Autonomous Council
  - Karbi Anglong Autonomous Council
  - Tiwa Autonomous Council
  - Mising Autonomous Council
  - Rabha Hasong Autonomous Council
  - Sonowal Kachari Autonomous Council
  - Thengal Kachari Autonomous Council
  - Deori Autonomous Council
  - Moran Autonomous Council
  - Matak Autonomous Council
  - Bodo Kachari Welfare Autonomous Council
  - Kamatapur Autonomous Council
- Northeast India
- North Sentinel Island, a de facto self-governing island located in the Union Territory of Andaman and Nicobar Islands inhabited by the uncontacted Sentinelese people
- South India

=== In Japan ===
- Hokkaido
- Okinawa Prefecture

=== In the Middle East ===
- Armenia
- Assyrian homeland
- Balochistan
- Cappadocia
- Cyprus
- Israel
- Kurdistan
  - Iranian Kurdistan
  - Kurdistan Region (Iraq)
  - Rojava (Syria)
  - Turkish Kurdistan
- Nineveh (Iraq)
- Palestine
- Pontus (Turkey)

=== In Nicaragua ===
- Creol territory
- Maya territory
- Miskitos territory
- Miskitos and afrohonduras territory
- Miskitos and Maya territory

=== In New Zealand ===
- Cook Islands (Rarotonga)
- Niue
- Tokelau

=== In North Africa ===
- Nubia
- Tamazgha
  - Kabylia

=== In Pakistan ===
- Federally Administered Tribal Areas

=== In Panama ===
- Emberá-Wounaan
- Guna Yala
- Guna de Madungandí
- Guna de Wargandí
- Naso Tjër Di
- Ngäbe-Buglé

=== In Peru ===
Communal reserves are conservation areas for flora and fauna, allowing traditional use for the rural populations surrounding the areas. The use and marketing of the natural resources within the communal reserve is conducted by the same rural populations.

Reserve	Date	Area (ha)
Yanesha	28 April 1988	34,744
El Sira	22 June 2001	616,413
Amarakaeri	9 May 2002	402,335
Asháninka	14 January 2003	184,468
Machiguenga	14 January 2003	218,905
Purús	20 November 2004	202,033
Tuntanain	10 August 2007	94,967
Chayu Nain	9 December 2009	23,597

=== In the Philippines ===
- Bangsamoro
- Cordillera Administrative Region

=== In Russia ===
- Autonomous okrugs of Russia
- National raions of Russia
- Republics of Russia
- Territory of Traditional Natural Resource Use

=== In South Africa ===
- !Ae!Hai Heritage Park
  - San Heritage Land
  - Mier Heritage Land

=== In Sri Lanka ===
- Eastern Province
- Northern Province

=== In Sudan ===
- Darfur

=== In Taiwan ===
- Indigenous Areas

=== In Ukraine ===
- Crimea

=== In the United States ===
- Indian reservations
- Alaska Native villages
- Hawaiian Homelands
- American Samoa
  - Swains Island
- Northern Mariana Islands

=== In Venezuela ===
Most of the indigenous territories are located in the southern parts.

== Conservation of nature ==
Some lands inhabited for indigenous peoples can be considered as Indigenous and Community Conserved Area.

== See also ==
- Indigenous land rights
- Struggle for the Land
