= Autonomous administrative division =

Designation for an administrative territorial entity

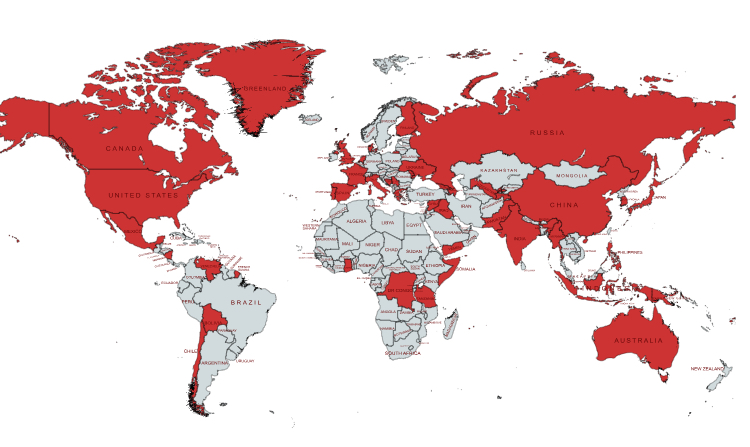
Countries with at least one autonomous area

An autonomous administrative division (also referred to as an autonomous area, autonomous zone, autonomous entity, autonomous unit, autonomous region, autonomous subdivision, autonomous province, or autonomous territory) is a subnational administrative division or internal territory of a sovereign state that has a degree of autonomy—self-governance—under the national government. Autonomous areas are distinct from other constituent units of a federation (e.g. a state, or province) in that they possess unique powers for their given circumstances. Typically, it is either geographically distinct from the rest of the state or populated by a national minority, which may exercise home rule. Decentralization of self-governing powers and functions to such divisions is a way for a national government to try to increase democratic participation or administrative efficiency or to defuse internal conflicts. States that include autonomous areas may be federacies, federations, or confederations. Autonomous areas can be divided into territorial autonomies, subregional territorial autonomies, and local autonomies. The autonomous areas differ from federal units and independent states in the sense that they, in relation to the majority of other sub-national territories in the same country, enjoy a special status including some legislative powers, within the state (for a detailed list of federated units, see federated state).

This list includes areas that are internationally recognized, as well as some that are generally unrecognized. (Note: For example: "China, Hong Kong Special Administrative Region". United Nations.) (Note: See International recognition of Kosovo for states that do and do not recognize the Republic of Kosovo.) The definition of an autonomous area varies from country to country, so the native term as defined by the respective country's government is listed, and the English translation of the term is included.

== Autonomous areas ==
Country	Native term Translation or equivalent	Instances (areas became autonomous in the year(s) indicated, if available)	References
Antigua and Barbuda	autonomous island	Barbuda (1976)	
Azerbaijan	muxtar respublika autonomous republic	Nakhchivan (1924)	
Cameroon	region with special status	Northwest (2019) · Southwest (2019)	
Chile	territorio especial special territory	Easter Island (Note: In 2007, the Chamber of Deputies of Chile passed a law designating both as "special territories", granting them more autonomy. Additionally, the Juan Fernandez Islands archipelago is a commune, while Easter Island is both a commune and a province.)	
China (PRC)	特別行政區 (Chinese) região administrativa especial (Portuguese, Macau) special administrative region (English, Hong Kong)	Hong Kong (1997) (Note: Sino-British Joint Declaration of 1984); Macao (1999) (Note: Sino-Portuguese Joint Declaration of 1987)	
China (PRC)	自治区 (zìzhìqū) autonomous region (Note: The special administrative regions have the highest degree of autonomy from the central government in Beijing. Autonomous regions contain a large minority ethnic group.)	Guangxi (1958) · Inner Mongolia (1947) · Ningxia (1958) · Xinjiang (1955) · Tibet (1965)	
East Timor	região administrativa especial special administrative region	Oecusse-Ambeno (2014)	
Fiji	autonomous region	Rotuma (1927)	
Finland	itsehallinnollinen maakunta (Finnish) självstyrande landskap (Swedish) autonomous province	Åland (1922) (Note: Åland convention)	
Georgia	avtonomiuri respublika autonomous republic	Abkhazia (1991-2008) (Note: De facto, Abkhazia and South Ossetia declared independence from Georgia, but de jure they are still part of Georgia. On 9 February 2026, the nominal autonomous government of South Ossetia was abolished.) (Note: The flag of Abkhazia shown is the proposed flag of the Georgian government from 2013.) · Adjara (1991)	
Greece	Αὐτόνομη Μοναστικὴ Πολιτεία (aftonomi monastiki politia) autonomous monastic state	Mount Athos (1913)	
Indonesia	daerah istimewa/khusus special region	Yogyakarta (1950) · Jakarta (1959) · Aceh (2005)	
Indonesia	daerah otonomi khusus special autonomous region	Papua (2000) · West Papua (2008) · Central Papua (2022) · Highland Papua (2022) · South Papua (2022) · Southwest Papua (2022)	
Iraq	autonomous region	Kurdistan Region (1992) (Note: Semi-autonomous federal region of Iraq; the constitution of Iraq gives a degree of autonomy to administrative divisions, such as regions and provinces, in matters that are not within the exclusive remit of the federal government of Iraq. Regional law may take priority (in case of dispute) if the law falls within the remit of "shared authorities" and does not contradict with the provisions of the constitution of Iraq. The Federal Supreme Court of Iraq has the authority to repeal and amend regional law. (Note: In a verdict issued in February 2024, the Supreme Court of Iraq simultaneously revoked as well as amended Kurdistan Region's legislation, setting a legal precedent for the latter.))	
Italy	regione autonoma autonomous region	Aosta Valley (1948) · Friuli-Venezia Giulia (1963) · Sardinia (1948) · Sicily (1946) · Trentino-Alto Adige/Südtirol (1948)	
Mauritius	autonomous island	Rodrigues (2002)	
Moldova	unitate teritorială autonomă autonomous territorial unit	Gagauzia (1995) · Left Bank of the Dniester (2005) (Note: In 1990, the Pridnestrovian Moldavian Republic (PMR, commonly known as Transnistria) declared its independence from the Soviet Union. While Moldova has not formally recognized Transnistria's independence and still has an administrative apparatus for the claimed Autonomous Territorial Unit, its independence is recognized by 3 other non-UN member states.)	
Nicaragua	región autónoma autonomous region	North Caribbean Coast (1986) · South Caribbean Coast (1986)	
Pakistan	self-governing entity	Azad Kashmir (1974) (Note: Azad Kashmir is a self-governing polity which has not been formally annexed by Pakistan. It was established after a rebellion against the Maharajah of Kashmir, and the subsequent First Kashmir War. It is located within the historic Kashmir region, which is disputed between India, Pakistan and China.) · Gilgit-Baltistan (2009)	
Papua New Guinea	autonomous region	Bougainville (2000)	
Philippines	rehiyong awtonomo autonomous region	Bangsamoro (2019)	
Portugal	região autónoma autonomous region	Azores (1976) · Madeira (1976)	
Russia	avtonomnaya respublika autonomous republic	Adygea · Altai Republic · Bashkortostan · Buryatia · Chechnya · Chuvashia · Republic of Crimea (Note: Claimed by Ukraine and considered by most of the international community to be part of Ukraine.) · Dagestan · Donetsk People's Republic · Ingushetia · Kabardino-Balkaria · Kalmykia · Karachay-Cherkessia · Karelia · Khakassia · Komi · Luhansk People's Republic · Mari El · Mordovia · North Ossetia-Alania · Sakha Republic · Tatarstan · Tuva · Udmurtia	
Russia	avtonomnaya oblast autonomous province	(Jewish Autonomous Oblast) Jewish	
Russia	avtonomny okrug autonomous district	Chukotka · Khanty-Mansi · Nenets · Yamalo-Nenets	
Saint Kitts and Nevis	autonomous island	Nevis (1967)	
São Tomé and Príncipe	região autónoma autonomous region	Príncipe (1995)	
Serbia	autonomna pokrajina autonomous province	Vojvodina (1945) · Kosovo and Metohija (1945–1999) (Note: Since 1999, it hasn't been under the direct control of Serbia. It became an "entity under interim international administration" and later a partially recognised state.)	
South Korea	특별자치도 special self-governing province	Jeju	
Tajikistan	viloyat mukhtor autonomous province	Gorno-Badakhshan (1925)	
Tanzania	Serikali ya Mapinduzi revolutionary government	Zanzibar (1964)	
Trinidad and Tobago	autonomous island	Tobago (1980) (Note: The Tobago House of Assembly is a devolved legislature that is responsible for the island of Tobago.)	
Ukraine	avtonomna respublika autonomous republic	(Autonomous Republic of Crimea) Crimea (1998–2014)	
United Kingdom	UK constituent country with devolution (Note: Three of the four constituent countries of the United Kingdom, namely Scotland, Wales and Northern Ireland, each have an elected, devolved legislature which has the ability to legislate in devolved matters. The Parliament of the United Kingdom which retains sovereignty (the United Kingdom is a unitary state), can dissolve the devolved legislatures at any time, and legislates in matters that are not devolved, as well as having the capacity to legislate in areas that are devolved (by constitutional convention, without the agreement of the devolved legislature). Formerly, both Scotland and England were fully sovereign states.)	Northern Ireland (1998) (Note: Good Friday Agreement) · Scotland (1999) · Wales (1999)	
Uzbekistan	respublika (autonomous) republic	Karakalpakstan (1932)	
West Bank and Gaza Strip	"سلطة الحكم الذاتي الفلسطينية المؤقتة" (Arabic) "Palestinian Interim Self-Government Authority" הסמכות המינהלית הפלסטינית (Hebrew) interim administrative authority	Palestinian National Authority (1994) (Note: Oslo Accords (1993)) (Note: Oslo II Accord (1995))	

=== Dependent, overseas and associated territories with autonomy ===
Country	Native term Translation or equivalent	Instances (areas became autonomous in the year(s) indicated, if available)	Notes	References
Denmark	autonomous territory (Danish Realm)	Faroe Islands (1948) · Greenland (1979)	The two autonomous territories (Danish: rigsdel, Faroese: land, Greenlandic: nuna) of the realm of the Kingdom, the Faroe Islands and Greenland, each have an elected devolved legislature which has the ability to legislate in devolved matters. The Kingdom Parliament 'Folketinget' retains sovereignty (The Kingdom of Denmark is a unitary state) and legislates in matters that are not devolved, as well as having the capacity to legislate in areas that are devolved (this does not normally occur without the agreement of the devolved legislature).	
France	collectivité sui generis sui generis collectivity	New Caledonia (1999)	The French Constitution recognises three autonomous jurisdictions. Corsica, a region of France, enjoys a greater degree of autonomy on matters such as tax and education compared to mainland regions. New Caledonia, a sui generis collectivity, and French Polynesia, an overseas collectivity, are highly autonomous territories with their own government, legislature, currency, and constitution. They do not, however, have legislative powers for policy areas relating to law and order, defense, border control or university education. Other smaller overseas collectivities have a lesser degree of autonomy through local legislatures. The five overseas regions, French Guiana, Guadeloupe, Martinique, Mayotte, and Réunion, are generally governed the same as mainland regions; however, they enjoy some additional powers, including certain legislative powers for devolved areas.	
France	collectivité d'outre-mer overseas collectivity	Saint Barthélemy (2007) · Saint Martin (2007) · Saint Pierre and Miquelon (2003) · Wallis and Futuna (2003)		
France	pays d'outre-mer overseas country	French Polynesia (2004)		
Netherlands	autonoom land autonomous country	Aruba (1986) · Curaçao (2010) · Sint Maarten (2010)	Autonomous countries within the Kingdom of the Netherlands, each with their own parliament. In addition they enjoy autonomy in taxation matters as well as having their own currencies.	
New Zealand	state in free-association	Cook Islands (1965) · Niue (1974)	New Zealand maintains nominal sovereignty over three Pacific Island nations, the Cook Islands, Niue and Tokelau. The Chatham Islands—despite having the designation of Territory—is an integral part of the country, situated within the New Zealand archipelago; its council is not autonomous and has broadly the same powers as other local councils, although notably it can also charge levies on goods entering or leaving the islands.	
New Zealand	self-administering territory	Tokelau (1948)	New Zealand maintains nominal sovereignty over three Pacific Island nations, the Cook Islands, Niue and Tokelau. The Chatham Islands—despite having the designation of Territory—is an integral part of the country, situated within the New Zealand archipelago; its council is not autonomous and has broadly the same powers as other local councils, although notably it can also charge levies on goods entering or leaving the islands.	
United Kingdom	Crown Dependency	Guernsey · Isle of Man · Jersey		
United Kingdom	British Overseas Territory	Anguilla · Bermuda · British Virgin Islands · Cayman Islands · Falkland Islands · Gibraltar · Montserrat · Turks and Caicos Islands		
United States	Commonwealth	Puerto Rico (1952) · Northern Mariana Islands (1978)	All five insular areas are organized as unincorporated U.S. territories. Like U.S. states, they are subject to the sovereign jurisdiction of the U.S. federal government. Each territory has a local government headed by a democratically elected governor and legislature with powers within the territorial geographic boundaries.	
United States	Territories of the United States	Guam (1950) · US Virgin Islands (1954) · American Samoa (1967)	All five insular areas are organized as unincorporated U.S. territories. Like U.S. states, they are subject to the sovereign jurisdiction of the U.S. federal government. Each territory has a local government headed by a democratically elected governor and legislature with powers within the territorial geographic boundaries.	

Notes:

- (Svalbard and Jan Mayen) Svalbard, Norway: Although it does not fit the definition of autonomous area (not possessing partial internal sovereignty), Svalbard has the sovereignty of Norway limited by the Spitsbergen Treaty of 1920 and therefore is considered as having special status (as it is considered fully integrated with Norway, and not a dependency, it is a sui generis case).

=== All first level divisions are autonomous ===
Country	Native term Translation or equivalent	Instances (areas became autonomous in the year indicated, if available)	References
Bolivia	departamento (autonomous) department	Beni (2006) · Pando (2006) · Santa Cruz (2006) · Tarija (2006) · La Paz (2009) · Cochabamba (2009) · Chuquisaca (2009) · Oruro (2009) · Potosi (2009)	
Comoros	île autonome autonomous island	Anjouan (2002) · Grande Comore (2002) · Mohéli (2002) · Mayotte (2002) (Note: Even though France administered Mayotte after the 1974 and 1976 independence referendums, Comoros continued to claim Mayotte as an autonomous island, despite have no government-in-exile for it.)	
Spain	comunidad autónoma (in Spanish) autonomia erkidegoa (in Basque) comunautat autonòma (in Occitan) comunitat autònoma (in Catalan/Valencian) comunidade autónoma (in Galician) comunidá autónoma (in Asturian) comunidat autonoma (in Aragonese) autonomous community (nationalities and regions of Spain)	Andalusia (1981) · Aragon (1982) · Asturias (1981) · Balearic Islands (1983) · Basque Country (1979) · Canary Islands (1982) · Cantabria (1981) · Castile–La Mancha (1982) · Castile and León (1983) · Catalonia (1979) (Note: From 2017 to 2018, Catalonia was directly ruled from Madrid by the Senate of Spain amidst the unilateral Catalan declaration of independence and the constitutional crisis thereafter. This direct rule ended after Quim Torra was elected as the new president of Catalonia.) · Extremadura (1983) · Galicia (1981) · La Rioja (1982) · Madrid (1983) · Murcia (1982) · Navarre (1982) · Valencian Community (1982)	
Spain	ciudad autónoma autonomous city	Ceuta (1995) · Melilla (1995)	

=== Sub-first level autonomous areas ===
Country	Native term Translation or equivalent	Instances (areas became autonomous in the year(s) indicated, if available)	References
Australia	Regional authority	Torres Strait Islands (1994)	
Bolivia	provincia autónoma autonomous province	Gran Chaco (2009)	
Bolivia	municipio autónomo autonomous municipality	Huacaya · Tarabuco · Mojocoya · Charazani · Jesús de Machaca · Pampas Aullagas · San Pedro de Totora · Chipaya · Salinas de Garci Mendoza · Chayanta · Charagua	
Canada	Autonomous area	Nunatsiavut (2005)	
Chile	Comuna de Chile communes	Juan Fernández Islands	
China (PRC)	自治州 (zìzhìzhōu) autonomous prefecture	Bayingolin · Bortala · Changji · Chuxiong · Dali · Dehong · Dêqên · Enshi · Gannan · Garzê · Golog · Yushu · Haibei · Hainan · Haixi · Honghe · Huangnan · Ili · Kizilsu · Liangshan · Linxia · Ngawa · Nujiang · Qiandongnan · Qiannan · Qianxinan · Wenshan · Xiangxi · Xishuangbanna (Sibsongbanna) · Yanbian	
China (PRC)	自治县 (zìzhìxiàn) autonomous county	117 (full list)	
China (PRC)	自治旗 (zìzhìqí) autonomous banner	Evenki · Morin Dawa · Oroqen	
Ethiopia	Special woredas	Argobba (Afar) · Argobba (Amhara) · Itang · Kebena · Mao-Komo · Mareko · Pawe · Tembaro	
India	autonomous districts and territorial councils	Bodoland (2003) · Bodo Kachari (2020) · Chakma (1972) · Chandel (1971) · Churachandpur (1971) · Deori (2005) · Dima Hasao (1970) · Garo Hills (1952) · Gorkhaland (2011) · Jaintia Hills (1972) · Kamatapur (2020) · Karbi Anglong (1970) · Kargil Hills (1995) · Khasi Hills (1952) · Lai (1972) · Leh Hills (1995) · Senapati (1971) · Mara (1972) · Matak (2020) · Mising (1995) · Moran (2020) · Rabha Hasong (1995) · Sadar Hills (1971) · Senapati (1971) · Sinlung Hills Council (2018) · Sonowal Kachari (2005) · Tamenglong (1971) · Thengal Kachari (2005) · Tiwa (1995) · Tripura Tribal Areas (1982) · Ukhrul (1971) and de facto autonomous area – North Sentinel Island (1956)	
Italy	provincia autonoma autonomous province	South Tyrol (Note: South Tyrol has a considerable level of self-government, consisting of a large range of exclusive legislative and executive powers and a fiscal regime that allows it to retain 90% of revenue, while remaining a net contributor to the national budget.) (Note: Gruber–De Gasperi Agreement (1946)) (1946, 1972) · Trentino (1972)	
Myanmar	ကိုယ်ပိုင်အုပ်ချုပ်ခွင့်ရဒေသ self-administered zones	Danu Self-Administered Zone (2010) · Naga Self-Administered Zone (2010) · Pa Laung Self-Administered Zone (2010–2023) (Note: Dissolved following the takeover of its territory by the Ta'ang National Liberation Army, still de jure exists) · Pa-O Self-Administered Zone (2010) · Kokang Self-Administered Zone (2010–2024) (Note: Dissolved following the takeover of its territory by the Myanmar National Democratic Alliance Army, still de jure exists)	
Myanmar	ကိုယ်ပိုင်အုပ်ချုပ်ခွင့်ရတိုင်း self-administered division	Wa Self-Administered Division (2011–2024) (Note: Dissolved following the takeover of its territory by the Wa State, still de jure exists)	
Myanmar	အထူးဒေသ special region (Note: Territories controlled ethnic armed organisations which signed a ceasefire with the government are recognised by it.)	Kachin State Special Region 1 (1989–2024) (Note: Dissolved following the takeover of its territory by the Kachin Independence Army.) · Kachin State Special Region 2 (1994–2011) (Note: The Kachin Independence Army broke its ceasefire and resumed attacks on the government.) · Kayah State Special Region 1 (1992) · Kayah State Special Region 2 (1994–2023) (Note: The Karenni National People's Liberation Front broke its ceasefire and resumed attacks on the government.) · Kayah State Special Region 3 (1994) · Shan State Special Region 1 (1990) · (Wa State) Shan State Special Region 2 (1989) · Shan State Special Region 3 (1989) · Shan State Special Region 4 (1989) · Shan State Special Region 5 (1991–2023)	
Spain	Entitat territorial autònoma Autonomous territorial entity	Val d'Aran (1990)	
United Kingdom	Jurisdiction of Bailiwick of Guernsey	Alderney · Guernsey · Sark (1565)	

Notes:

- Heligoland, Germany: Although it is part of a German state, Schleswig-Holstein, it has been excluded from some European Union normatives, such as customs union and the Value Added Tax Area.
- Büsingen am Hochrhein, Germany and Campione d'Italia, Italy: Despite being integral parts of their respective countries, these two enclaves of Switzerland predominantly use Swiss franc as currency and are in customs union with it.
- Alsace and Moselle, France: While it does not enjoy outright autonomy, there is a special local law in the region most famously the Concordat in Alsace–Moselle.

=== Areas designated for indigenous peoples ===
State	Native term Translation or equivalent	Division	Notes	References
Bolivia	territorio indígena indigenous territory	All native community lands (tierras comunitarias de origen)		
Canada	First Nations reserve (list)	Nisga'a	Created by the Nisga'a Final Agreement in 2000. The Nisga'a Territory runs semi-autonomously from the rest of Canada. Located in Northwestern British Columbia, within kilometres of the Alaska Panhandle.	
Canada	First Nations reserve (list)	Tłı̨chǫ		
Canada	First Nations reserve (list)	Haida Nation		
Canada	First Nations reserve (list)	Toquaht		
Canada	First Nations reserve (list)	Ucluelet		
Canada	First Nations reserve (list)	Tsawwassen		
Canada	First Nations reserve (list)	Tla'amin Nation		
Canada	First Nations reserve (list)	Huu-ay-aht		
Canada	First Nations reserve (list)	Kyuquot/Cheklesahht		
Canada	First Nations reserve (list)	Uchucklesaht		
Taiwan (Republic Of China)	原住民族地區 (yuánzhùmínzú dìqū); Indigenous Area	55 (full list)		
Costa Rica	Reino; Kingdom	Kingdom of Talamanca (1867-1910)		
Panama	comarca indígena indigenous territory	Emberá-Wounaan (1983) · Guna de Madungandí (1996) · Kuna de Wargandí (2000) · Guna Yala (1938) · Ngöbe-Buglé (1997) · Naso Tjër Di Comarca (2020)		
South Africa	Homeland	Bophuthatswana (1972–1977) (Note: The TBVC States were granted nominal independence and continued to exist until 1994.) · Ciskei (1972–1981) · Gazankulu (1973–1994) · KaNgwane (1976–1994) · KwaNdebele (1981–1994) · KwaZulu (1977–1994) · Lebowa (1972–1994) · QwaQwa (1974–1994) · Transkei (1963–1976) · Venda (1973–1979)		
South Africa	Homelands in South West Africa	Ovamboland (1973-1980) · Kavangoland (1973-1980) · East Caprivi (1976-1980)		
United States	Reservation (list); Domestic dependent nations	Hopi Reservation		
United States	Reservation (list); Domestic dependent nations	Cherokee Nation		
United States	Reservation (list); Domestic dependent nations	Sac and Fox Nation		
United States	Reservation (list); Domestic dependent nations	Choctaw Nation		
United States	Reservation (list); Domestic dependent nations	Pine Ridge Indian Reservation		
United States	Reservation (list); Domestic dependent nations	Navajo Nation		
United States	Reservation (list); Domestic dependent nations	Haudenosaunee		
United States	Reservation (list); Domestic dependent nations	Colorado River Indian Tribes		

Other areas that are autonomous in nature but not in name are areas designated for indigenous peoples, such as those of the Americas:

- Aboriginal (First Nation or Native American or Indian) Indian reserve and Indian reservation, in, respectively, Canada and the United States.

== Other entities called "autonomous" ==
A number of entities are also officially called "autonomous", though they do not have an exceptional freedom from external authority, and would not fall under the definition of autonomous area. They are listed here for clarity.

=== Independent cities called "autonomous" ===
Capitals in bold.

Country	Native term Translation or equivalent	Instances (areas became autonomous in the year indicated, if available)	References
Argentina	ciudad autónoma autonomous city	**Buenos Aires** (1994)	
Armenia	autonomous city	**Yerevan**	
Belarus	autonomous city	**Minsk**	
Cambodia	krong autonomous municipality (Note: English name used by government sources rather than a literally translation.)	**Phnom Penh** (1962) · Sihanoukville (1983) · Pailin · Kep	
Central African Republic	commune autonome autonomous commune	**Bangui**	
China (ROC)	市 (Shì) autonomous municipality	Chiayi (1982) · Hsinchu (1982) · Keelung (1945)	
Guinea-Bissau	sector autónomo autonomous sector	**Bissau region**	
Hungary	autonomous city	**Budapest**	
Mexico	autonomous city	**Mexico City** (2016)	
Senegal	ville sainte holy city	Touba	
Serbia	autonomous city	**Belgrade**	
South Korea	특별자치시 special autonomous city	Sejong	
Uzbekistan	shahar autonomous city	**Tashkent** (1996)	

=== Self-declared entities called "autonomous" ===
Country	Native term Translation or equivalent	Instances (areas became autonomous in the year indicated, if available)	References
Japan	村落共同体 village community	Atarashiki (1948)	
Mexico	Municipios Autónomos; Autonomous Municipalities	Zapatista territories (1993) (Note: a de facto autonomous region controlled or partially controlled by neo-Zapatista support bases in the Mexican state of Chiapas since the Zapatista uprising in 1994 and during the wider Chiapas conflict.)	
Syria	Rêveberiya Xweser; Autonomous Administration	Administrative Council of Jabal Bashan (2026)	
Bolivia	Federación de Juntas Vecinales; Federation of Neighborhood Councils	Federation of Neighborhood Councils-El Alto (1979)	

== Historical autonomous areas ==
Country	Native term Translation or equivalent	Instances (areas autonomous between the years indicated)	References
China		Bogd Khanate of Mongolia (1915–1919) (Note: Treaty of Kyakhta of 1915)	
China	自治县 (zìzhìxiàn) autonomous county	27 (full list)	
Czechoslovakia	Autonómna Krajina; Autonomous Land	Autonomous Land of Slovakia (1938–1939) · Subcarpathian Rus' (1938–1939) · Slovakia (1945-1969)	
Ethiopia	Autonomous State	Eritrea (1952–1962)	
Ethiopia	Autonomous Province	Assab (1987–1991) · Dire Dawa (1987–1991) · Eritrea Province (1987–1991) · Ogaden (1987–1991) · Tigray Province (1987–1991)	
Georgia	დროებითი ადმინისტრაციულ-ტერიტორიული ერთეული (Droebiti Adminisṭraciul-Ṭeriṭoriuli Erteuli); Temporary Administrative-Territorial Unit	Administration of the Temporary Administrative-Territorial Unit on the Territory of the Former Autonomous Region of South Ossetia (2007–2026)	
Hungary	Szék; Seat	Székely seats (12th century–1876) · Kunság (1279–1876) · Saxon seats (13th century–1876)	
Myanmar	အထူးဒေသ special region	Shan State Special Region 6 (1991–2010) · Shan State Special Region 7 (1991–2010)	
Lithuania	Kraštas; Region	Klaipėda Region (1923–1939) (Note: Klaipėda Convention)	
Malaysia	Negeri; State	State of Singapore (1963–1965)	
Ottoman Empire	Principality (Note: Bulgarian: Княжество (Knyazhestvo), Greek: Ηγεμονία (Igemonía), Romanian: Principatul, Serbian: Књажество (Knjažestvo))	Principality of Bulgaria (1878–1908) (Note: Treaty of Berlin of 1878) · Principality of Montenegro (1852–1878) · United Principalities of Moldavia and Wallachia (1859–1878) · Principality of Samos (1834–1912) · Principality of Serbia (1807/1815–1878)	
Ottoman Empire	Πολιτεία (politia); State	Cretan State (1898–1908/1913)	
Ottoman Empire	Vilayet (Turkish); Област (Oblast; Bulgarian); Province	Eastern Rumelia (1878–1885/1908)	
Ottoman Empire	Mutasarrıflık; Governorate	Mount Lebanon Mutasarrifate (1861–1915) (Note: Règlement organique of 1861)	
Philippines	Rehiyong Awtonomo; Autonomous Region	Central Mindanao (1979–1989) · (Autonomous Region in Muslim Mindanao) Muslim Mindanao (1989–2019) · Western Mindanao (1979–1989)	
Poland	Województwo; Voivodeship	Silesian Voivodeship (1920–1939)	
Romania	Regiunea Autonomă; Autonomous Region	Magyar Autonomous Region (1952–1968)	
Russia	Губерния (Gubernija); Governorate	Autonomous Governorate of Estonia (1917–1918)	
Russia	Автономный Округ (Avtonomnyy Okrug); Autonomous District	Agin-Buryat Autonomous Okrug (1937-2008) · Evenk Autonomous Okrug (1930-2007) · Komi-Permyak Autonomous Okrug (1930-2005) · Koryak Autonomous Okrug (1930-2007) · Komi-Permyak Autonomous Okrug (1930-2005) · Taymyr Autonomous Okrug (1930-2007) · Ust-Orda Buryat Autonomous Okrug (1937-2008)	
Soviet Union	Автономная Советская Социалистическая Республика (Avtonomnaja Sovetskaja Socialističeskaja Respublika); Autonomous Soviet Socialist Republic	Abkhaz ASSR (1931–1991) · Adjarian ASSR (1931–1991) · Bashkir ASSR (1919–1991) · Buryat ASSR (1923–1991) · Checheno-Ingush ASSR (1936–1944, 1957–1991) · Chuvash ASSR (1925–1991) · Crimean ASSR (1921–1945, 1991–1992) (Note: The Crimean Autonomous Soviet Socialist Republic continued to exist after the 1991 Ukrainian independence referendum until 1992.) · Dagestan ASSR (1921–1991) · Kabardino-Balkarian ASSR (1936–1991) · Kalmyk ASSR (1935–1943, 1958–1991) · Karakalpak ASSR (1932–1991) · Karelian ASSR (1923–1940, 1956–1991) · Kazakh ASSR (1920–1936) · Kirghiz ASSR (1926–1936) · Komi ASSR (1936–1991) · Mari ASSR (1936–1991) · Moldavian ASSR (1924–1940) · Mordovian ASSR (1934–1991) · Mountain ASSR (1921–1924) · Nakhichevan ASSR (1921–1991) · North Ossetian ASSR (1936–1991) · Tajik ASSR (1924–1929) · Tatar ASSR (1920–1991) · Turkestan ASSR (1920–1924) · Tuvan ASSR (1961–1991) · Udmurt ASSR (1934–1991) · Volga German ASSR (1924–1941) · Yakut ASSR (1922–1991)	
Soviet Union	Автономная Область (Avtonomnaja Oblastʹ); Autonomous Oblast	Adyghe Autonomous Oblast (1922–1991) · Buryat-Mongol Autonomous Oblast (1921–1923) · Chechen Autonomous Oblast (1922–1934) · Checheno-Ingush Autonomous Oblast (1934–1936) · Cherkess Autonomous Oblast (1928–1957) · Chuvash Autonomous Oblast (1920–1925) · Gorno-Altai Autonomous Oblast (1922–1990) · Gorno-Badakhshan Autonomous Oblast (1925–1991) · Ingush Autonomous Oblast (1922–1934) · Kabardino-Balkarian Autonomous Oblast (1922–1936) · Khakas Autonomous Oblast (1930–1991) · Kalmyk Autonomous Oblast (1920–1935, 1957–1958) · Kara-Kirghiz Autonomous Oblast (1924–1926) · Karachay Autonomous Oblast (1926–1943) · Karachay-Cherkess Autonomous Oblast (1922–1926, 1957–1991) · Karakalpak Autonomous Oblast (1925–1932) · Komi (Zyryan) Autonomous Oblast (1921–1936) · Mari Autonomous Oblast (1920–1936) · Moldavian Autonomous Oblast (1924) · Mongol-Buryat Autonomous Oblast (1922–1923) · Mordovian Autonomous Oblast (1930–1934) · Nagorno-Karabakh Autonomous Oblast (1923–1991) · North Ossetian Autonomous Oblast (1924–1936) · South Ossetian Autonomous Oblast (1922–1991) · Tuvan Autonomous Oblast (1944–1961) · Udmurt Autonomous Oblast (1920–1934)	
Spain	Región Autónoma; Autonomous Region	Catalonia (1931–1939) (Note: Continued to function in exile until 1977) · Basque Country (1936–1939) (Note: Continued to function in exile until 1979)	
Sudan	منطقة الحكم الذاتي (Minṭaqa al-Ḥukm aḏ-Ḏātī); Autonomous Region	Southern Sudan Autonomous Region (1972–1983) · Southern Sudan Autonomous Region (2005–2011)	
Ukraine	respublika republic	(Autonomous Republic of Crimea) Republic of Crimea (1992–1995)	
United Kingdom	self-governing territory	Southern Ireland (1921–1922)	
United Kingdom	self-governing colony	Canada (1848–1867) · Cape Colony (1872–1910) · Kenya Colony (1963–1963) · Crown Colony of Malta (1921–1936, 1947–1959, 1962–1964) · Colony of Natal (1893–1910) · New Brunswick (1854–1867) · (Dominion of Newfoundland) Newfoundland (1855–1907) (Note: The Dominion of Newfoundland lost its autonomy again in 1934 and it joined Canada in 1949.) · New South Wales (1855–1901) · New Zealand (1856–1907) · Nova Scotia (1848–1867) · Orange River Colony (1907–1910) · Prince Edward Island (1851–1867) · Queensland (1859–1901) · Colony of Singapore (1955–1963) · South Australia (1856–1901) · Southern Rhodesia (1923–1965, 1979–1980) · Tasmania (1856–1901) · Transvaal Colony (1906–1910) · Protectorate of Uganda (1961–1962) · (Victoria (state)) Victoria (1855–1901) · Western Australia (1890–1901)	
United Kingdom	autonomous government	Kurdish State (1918-1919)	
Yugoslavia	Бановина (Banovina); Banate	Banovina of Croatia (1939–1941)	

In some monarchies, usually composite monarchies, regional territories held different degrees of autonomy. Real and personal unions are seen as independent states rather than autonomous regions within a larger state.

Country	Native term Translation or equivalent	Instances (areas autonomous between the years indicated)	References
Austria	Kronland; Crown Land	Kingdom of Bohemia (1861-1913) · Kingdom of Croatia and Slavonia (1861-1867) · Kingdom of Dalmatia (1861-1912) · Kingdom of Galicia and Lodomeria (1861-1914) · Kingdom of Hungary (1861-1867) · (Kingdom of Lombardy-Venetia) Crown Land of Venetia (1861-1866) · Principality of Transylvania (1861–1867) · Upper Austria (1861-1918) · Lower Austria (1861-1918) · Duchy of Bukovina (1861-1918) · Duchy of Carinthia (1861-1918) · Duchy of Carniola (1861-1918) · Duchy of Salzburg (1861-1918) · Austrian Silesia (1861-1914) · Duchy of Styria (1861-1918) · Margraviate of Istria (1861-1918) · Margraviate of Moravia (1861-1914) · Princely County of Gorizia and Gradisca (1861-1918) · County of Tyrol (1861-1918) · County of Vorarlberg (1861-1918) · Imperial Free City of Trieste (1861-1918) · Condominium of Bosnia and Herzegovina (1910-1914)	
Hungary	Kraljevina; Kingdom	Kingdom of Croatia-Slavonia (1868–1918)	
Hungary	Corpus separatum Separated body	Fiume (1868–1913)	
Prussia	Großherzogtum; Grand Duchy	Grand Duchy of Posen (1815–1848) (Note: Congress of Vienna)	
Russian Empire	Великое Княжество (Velikoje Knjažestvo); Grand Duchy	Grand Duchy of Finland (1809–1917) (Note: Treaty of Fredrikshamn)	
Russian Empire	Царство (Carstvo); Kingdom	Congress Poland (1815–1830)	

Former self-proclaimed entities
Country	Native term Translation or equivalent	Instances (areas autonomous between the years indicated)	References
Albania	Republika Autonome; Autonomous Republic	Autonomous Republic of Northern Epirus (1914–1914)	
Albania	Krahina Autonome; Autonomous Province	Autonomous Province of Korçë (1916–1920)	
Bosnia and Herzegovina	Hrvatska Zajednica; Croatian Community	Herzeg-Bosnia (1991–1993)	
Bosnia and Herzegovina	Autonomna Pokrajina; Autonomous Province	Western Bosnia (1993–1995)	
Cyprus	Otonom Yönetimi; Autonomous Administration	Autonomous Turkish Cypriot Administration (1974–1975)	
Cyprus	Federe Devleti; Federated State	Turkish Federated State of Cyprus (1975–1983)	
(Russia) Russian Republic	Republic	Alash Autonomy (1917–1920) · Crimean People's Republic (1917–1918) · Idel-Ural State (1917–1918) · Kuban (1917–1918) · Moldavian Democratic Republic (1917–1918) · Mountainous Republic of the Northern Caucasus (1917–1918) · Turkestan Autonomy (1917–1918) · Ukrainian People's Republic (1917–1918)	
Somalia	Maamul-Goboleedka; State	Azania (2011–2013) · Central Regions State (2008–?) · Maakhir (2007–2009)	
Soviet Union	Советская Республика (Sovetskaja Respublika); Soviet Republic	Abkhaz Soviet Socialist Republic (1990–1991) · Pridnestrovian Moldavian Soviet Socialist Republic (1990–1991) · South Ossetian Soviet Democratic Republic (1990–1991)	
Soviet Union	Автономная Советская Социалистическая Республика (Avtonomnaja Sovetskaja Socialističeskaja Respublika); Autonomous Soviet Socialist Republic	Gagauz ASSR (1989–1995) (Note: It gained undeclared independence with the dissolution of the Soviet Union and continued to exist as a unrecognised political entity to its peaceful reintegration into Moldova in 1995.) · Gorno-Altai ASSR (1990–1991)	
Syria	Rêveberiya Xweser; Autonomous Administration	Democratic Autonomous Administration of North and East Syria (2012–2026) · Supreme Legal Committee in Suwayda (2025–2026)	
Yemen	المجلس الانتقالي al-Majlis al-Intiqālī; Transitional Council	Southern Transitional Council (2017–2026)	
Yugoslavia	Српска аутономна област (Srpska autonomna oblast); Serb Autonomous Oblasts	SAO Birač (1991–1991) · SAO Bosanska Krajina (1991–1992) · SAO Eastern Slavonia, Baranja and Western Syrmia (1991–1992) · SAO Krajina (1990–1991) · SAO North-East Bosnia (1991–1992) · SAO Northern Bosnia (1991–1992) · SAO Herzegovina (1991–1992) · SAO Romanija (1991–1992) · SAO Western Slavonia (1991–1991)	

== Proposed autonomous administrative divisions ==
=== Formal proposals ===
Current proposals

- Sahara Autonomous Region within Morocco (2007)
- Community of Serb Municipalities within the Republic of Kosovo (2013)
- Taiwan Special Administrative Region within the People's Republic of China

Proposals that were not implemented

- Eastern Galicia within Cisleithania (1918)
- Cordillera Autonomous Region within the Philippines (1990, 1998)
- Autonomous District of Glina and Knin within Croatia (1992)
- Kosovo within the Federal Republic of Yugoslavia (1999)
- Special Autonomous Region of East Timor within Indonesia (1999)
- Corsica within France (2003)
- Western Sahara Authority within Morocco (2003)
- North East England within the United Kingdom (2004)
- Nunavik within Quebec and Canada (2011)
- Darfur Region within Sudan (2016)

=== Ongoing campaigns ===
- Cornwall within the United Kingdom
- Yorkshire within the United Kingdom
- England within the United Kingdom
- Hungarian Autonomous Region within Serbia
- Corsica within France
- Occitania within France
- Savoie within France
- Veneto within Italy
- Silesia within Poland
- Székely Land within Romania
- Polish autonomy in the Vilnius Region within Lithuania
- Assyrian autonomy within Iraq
- Tamil Eelam within Sri Lanka

== See also ==
- Autocephaly
- Autonomous province
- Constituent country
- Countries of the United Kingdom
- Crown Dependencies
- Dependent territory (includes list)
- Devolution
- Federated state
- Imperial immediacy
- List of administrative divisions by country
- Lists of autonomous areas by country
  - Autonomous administrative divisions of China
  - Autonomous administrative divisions of India
  - Autonomous administrative divisions of Russia
  - Autonomous administrative divisions of Spain
- List of leaders of dependent territories
- List of national capitals serving as administrative divisions
- List of sovereign states
- Non-sovereign monarchy
- Protectorate
- Regional autonomy
- Personal union
- Region (administrative)
- Regional state
- Special administrative region
- Vassal state
