= Emblem of Assam =

Seal of Assam state

- Armiger: The Government of Assam
- Shield: Emblem of India
- Motto: "Oxom Sorkar" and "Government of Assam"

At present the state of Assam in India has not adopted a distinctive emblem for government use and instead uses the national emblem of India with the words "Oxom Sorkar" above and "Government of Assam" below. In February 2022, the Government of Assam decided to form a committee to consider the design for a distinctive emblem for the state.

== Historical emblems ==
Assam Province of British India used an emblem that depicted a black rhinoceros on a gold background.

Emblem of Ahom kingdom (1228–1826).

Badge of British Assam.

== Emblems of autonomous district councils in Assam ==
Some of the autonomous district councils within Assam have adopted distinctive emblems to represent themselves.

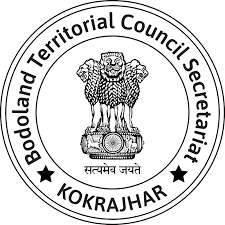
Bodoland

Deori

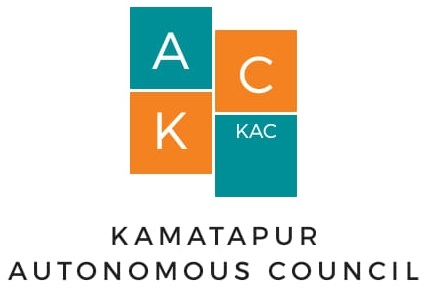
Kamatapur

Karbi Anglong

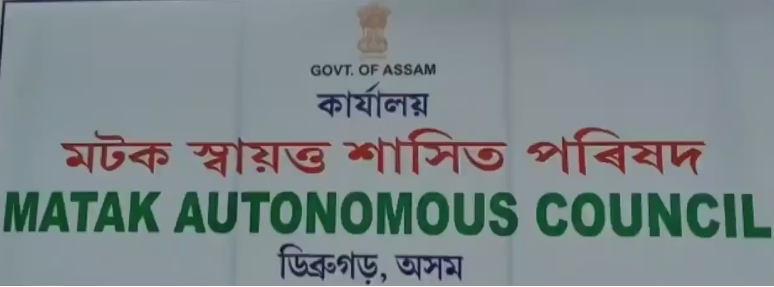
Matak

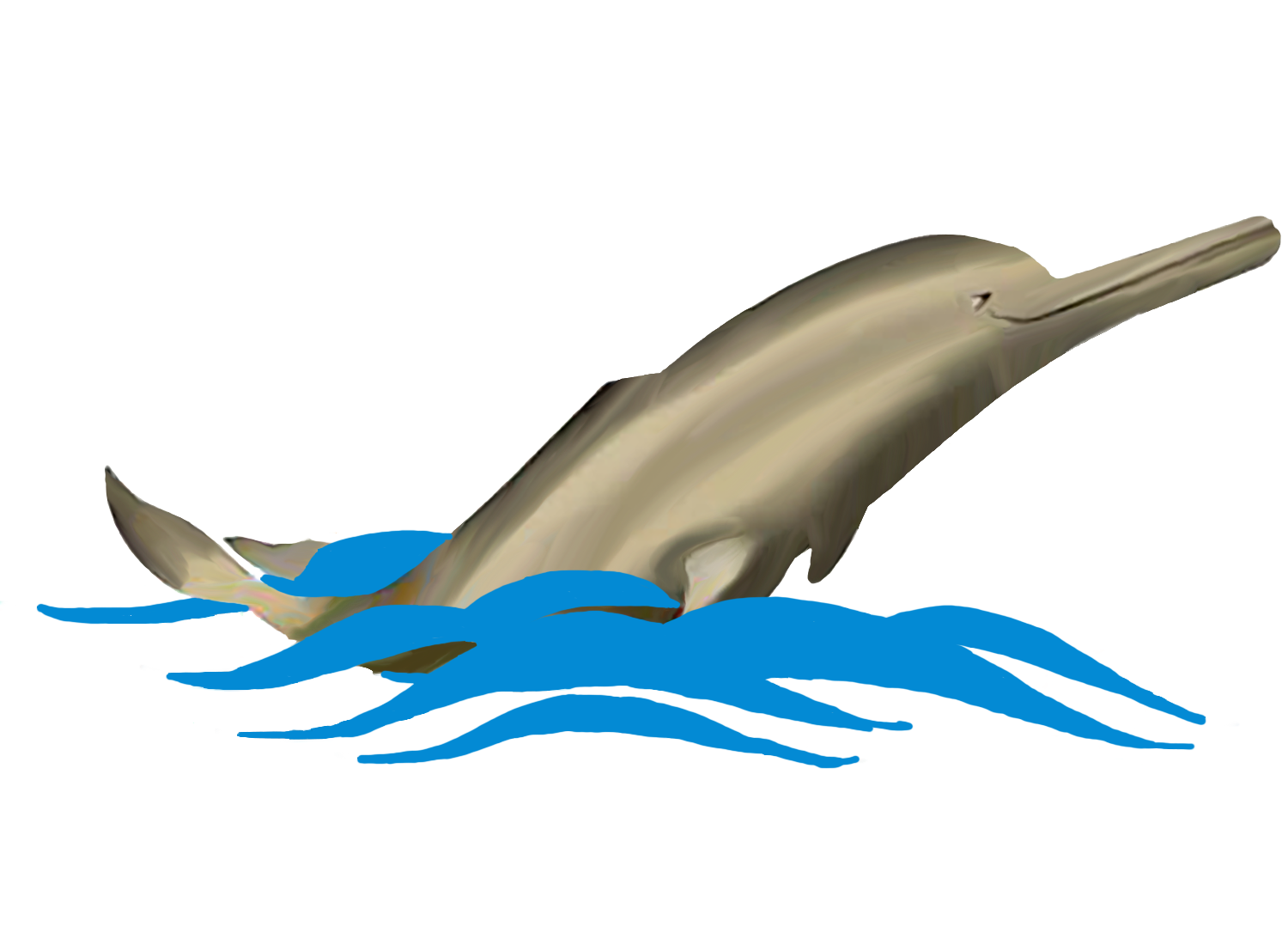
Mising

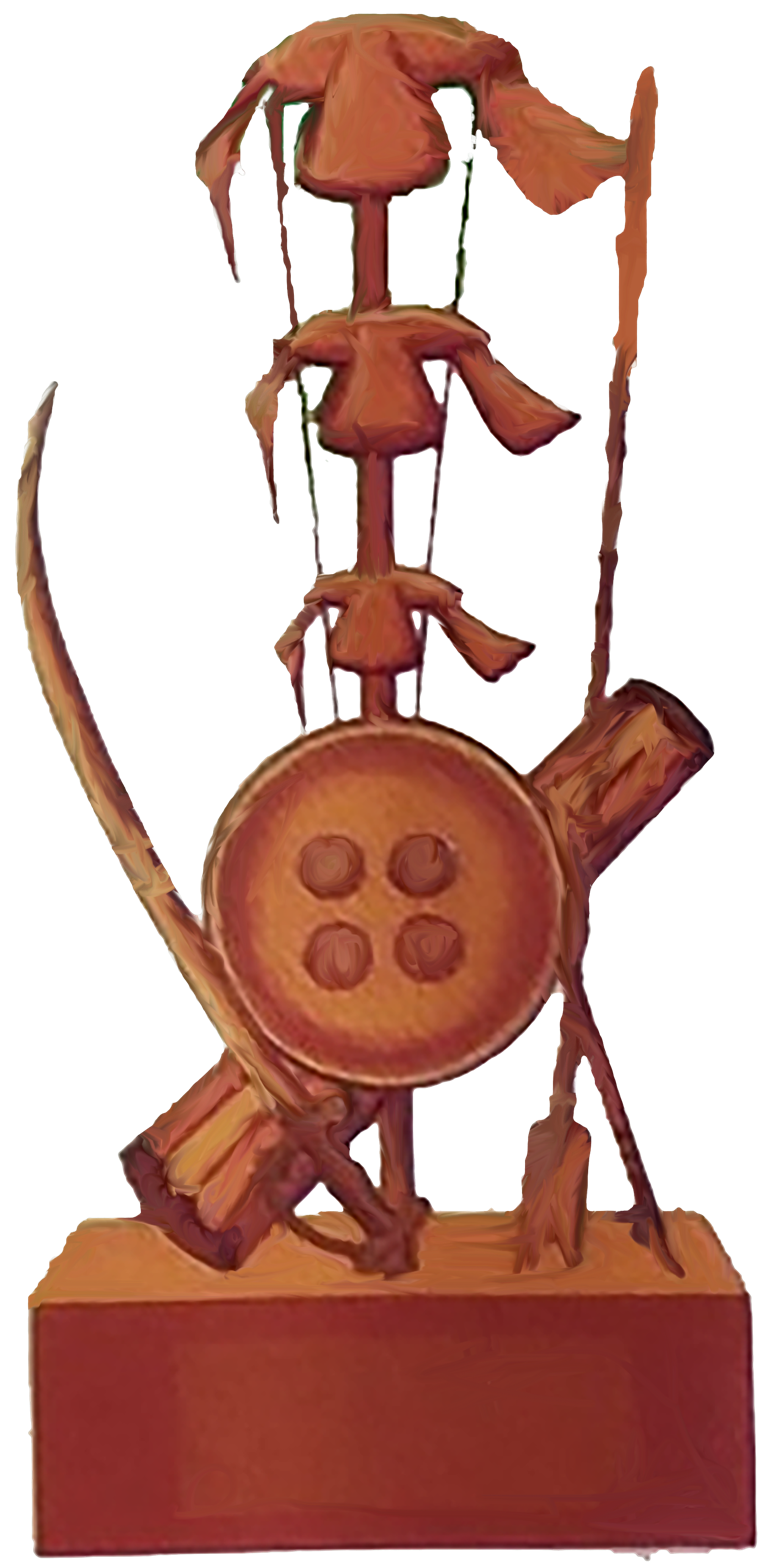
Rabha Hasong

Sonowal Kachari

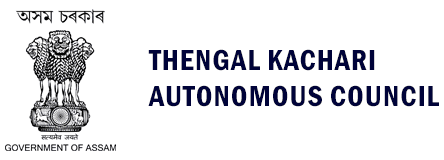
Thengal Kachari

== Government banner ==
The government of Assam can be represented by a banner displaying the emblem of the state on a white field.

== See also ==
- List of Assam state symbols
- National Emblem of India
- List of Indian state emblems
