= Rabha people =

Tibeto-Burmese ethnic group in northeast India

Rabha
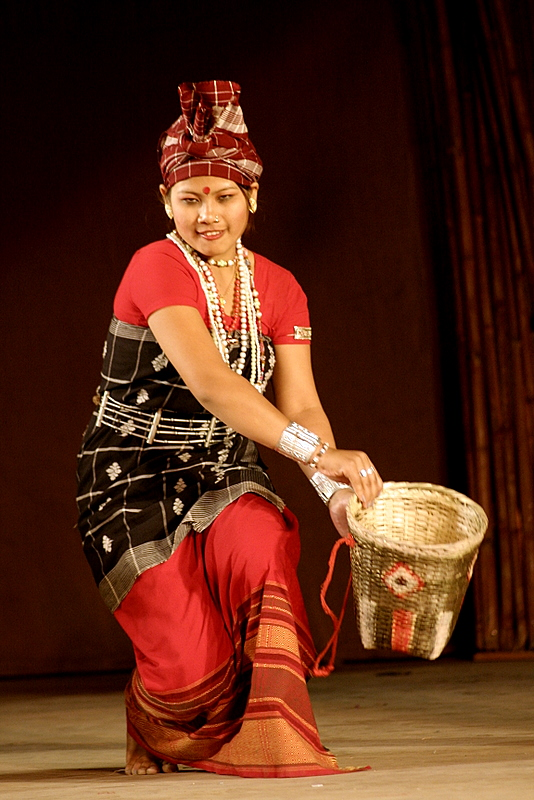

Total population
- c. 359,000 (2011)

Regions with significant populations
- Population in India and Bhutan
- Assam: 296,189
- Meghalaya: 32,662
- West Bengal: 27,820
- Bhutan: 1,600

Languages
- Assamese, Rabha

Religion
- Hinduism (40%); Animism (30%); Christianity (15.34%); Islam (0.43%)

Related ethnic groups
- Bodo-Kachari

The Rabha people are a Tibeto-Burmese ethnic group who live mostly in the Northeast Indian state of Assam, with a smaller population in the adjacent state of West Bengal. They primarily inhabit the plains of Lower Assam and the Dooars, while some are found in the Garo Hills. Outside India, they have a presence in Bhutan, with communities in nine districts. Most Rabhas of the Dooars refer to themselves as Rabhas, but some of them often declare themselves as Kocha.

== Groups ==
The Rabha community is divided into several subgroups or clans, each with distinct dialects, traditions, and cultural practices. According to linguistic and ethnographic studies, there are eleven dialectal groups of Rabhas: Rongdani, Maituri, Pati, Dahori, Dotla, Halua, Betolia, Hanna, Sunga, Modahi, and Kocha. Among these, the Rongdani, Maituri, and Kocha Rabha dialects are still actively spoken, while others have become endangered or completely died out.

These groups share close linguistic and cultural similarities with other members of the Bodo-Kachari ethnolinguistic family, including the Garo, Kachari, Mech, and Hajong communities.

The Rabhas belong to the Indo-Mongoloid group of people and are among the nine plains tribes and fourteen hill tribes of Assam. They are the fourth largest Scheduled Tribe in Assam at 7.63%, or 296,189 people according to the 2011 census. Excluding the two autonomous districts of Karbi Anglong and Dima Hasao, Rabhas are the third largest Scheduled Tribe (ST) in Assam at 9.78%. However, only 2.55% of Assam's population speaks the Rabha language according to the 2011 census.

== Culture ==
Traditionally, the Rabha economy primarily relied on agriculture, forest-based activities, shifting cultivation, and weaving. The Rabha were historically matriarchal.

== Language ==
Linguistically, Rabha has been classified in the following way: Sino-Tibetan, Tibeto-Burman, Jingpho-Konyak-Bodo, Konyak-Rabha, Rabha. Members of each of the nine groups of Rabha are thought to speak their own dialect. However, except Rongdani, Maituri and Kocha the rest of the Rabha groups have abandoned their mother tongue for Assamese. In their day-to-day conversation, they speak a variety of Assamese mixed with some Rabha words and expressions, and it has been called “Rabhamese" by some researchers (Tibeto-Burman speeches and their studies, n.d., 22). The language of the Kocha-Rabha is much more similar to the Koch rather than the Rabha. A sociolinguistic survey conducted among the Koch (Kondakov 2010) establishes the evidence for this. According to U. V. Joseph, the dialectic variations between Rongdani and Maituri are minimal. They are mutually intelligible, and the one merges almost imperceptibly into the other around the Goalpara Baida-Rongsai region. The Rongdani-Maituri dialectical differences become gradually more marked as one moves further west (Joseph 2000). Rabha, in many cases, shows points of resemblance with Atong, which is a variety traditionally considered a dialect of Garo.

== Notable people ==
- Akan Chandra Rabha, Indian politician
- Birubala Rabha (1954–2024), Indian activist
- Dipak Rabha, Indian politician
- Drishti Rajkhowa (born Manoj Rabha), Indian separatist
- Nabin Rabha (born 1996), Indian footballer
- Pabitra Rabha (born 1976), Indian actor
- Pabitra Rabha (Indian politician), (born 1996)
- Tankeswar Rabha (born 1973), Indian politician

== See also ==
- Rabha language
- Rabha Baptist Church Union
- Rabha Hasong Autonomous Council
- Rabha Hasong Joutha Mancha
- Rabha Jatiya Aikya Manch
- Assamese language
- Himalayan Languages Project
- Bishnu Prasad Rabha
