= Jadab Sawargiary =

Indian politician

Member of Assam Legislative Assembly
- In office 21 May 2021 – 4 May 2026
- Preceded by: Dipak Rabha
- Constituency: Dudhnai

Personal details
- Party: Indian National Congress

Jadab Sawargiary is an Indian politician from Indian National Congress. He was elected to the Assam Legislative Assembly in the 2021 election from Dudhnai constituency.
