= Autonomous administrative divisions of India =

Autonomous councils

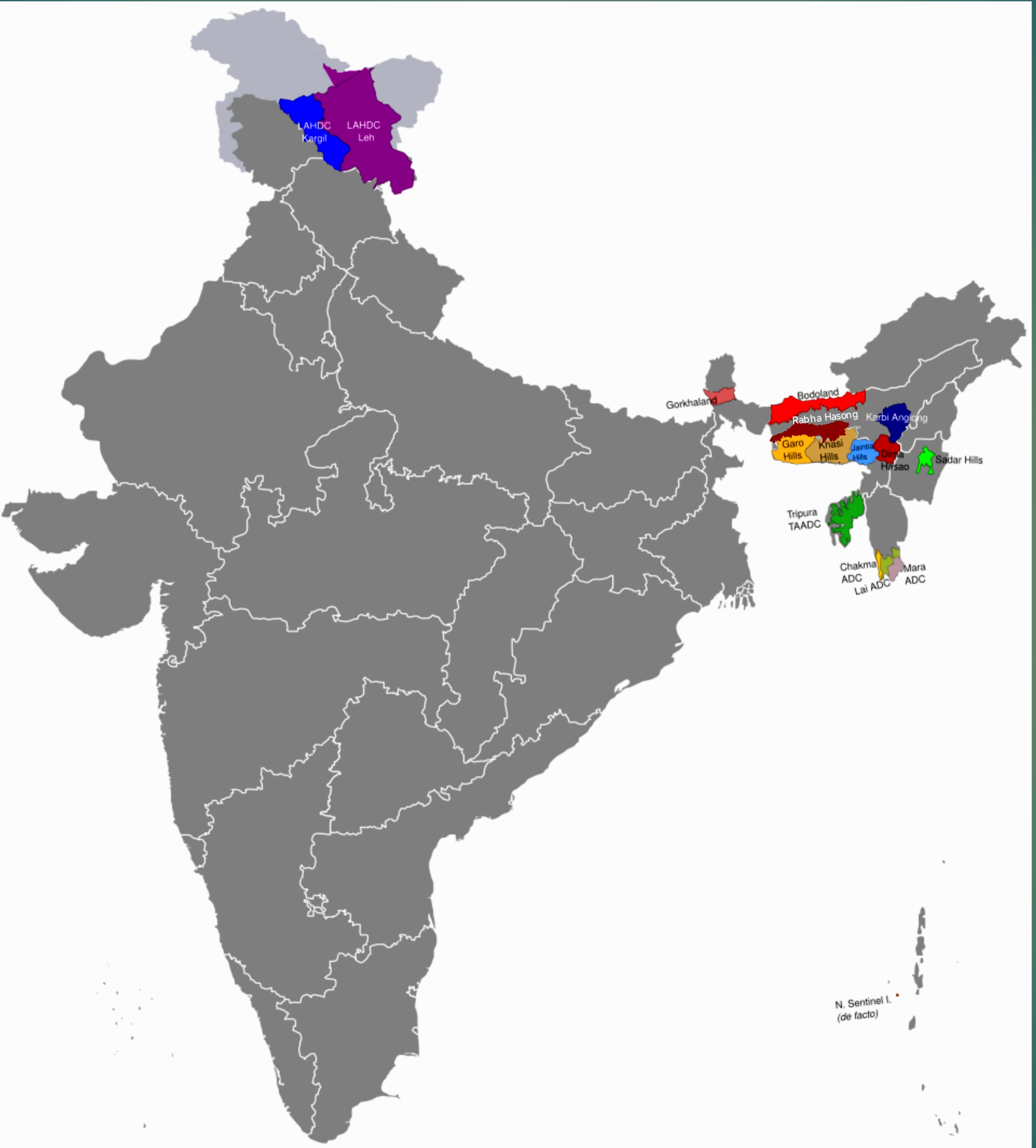
Autonomous councils in India

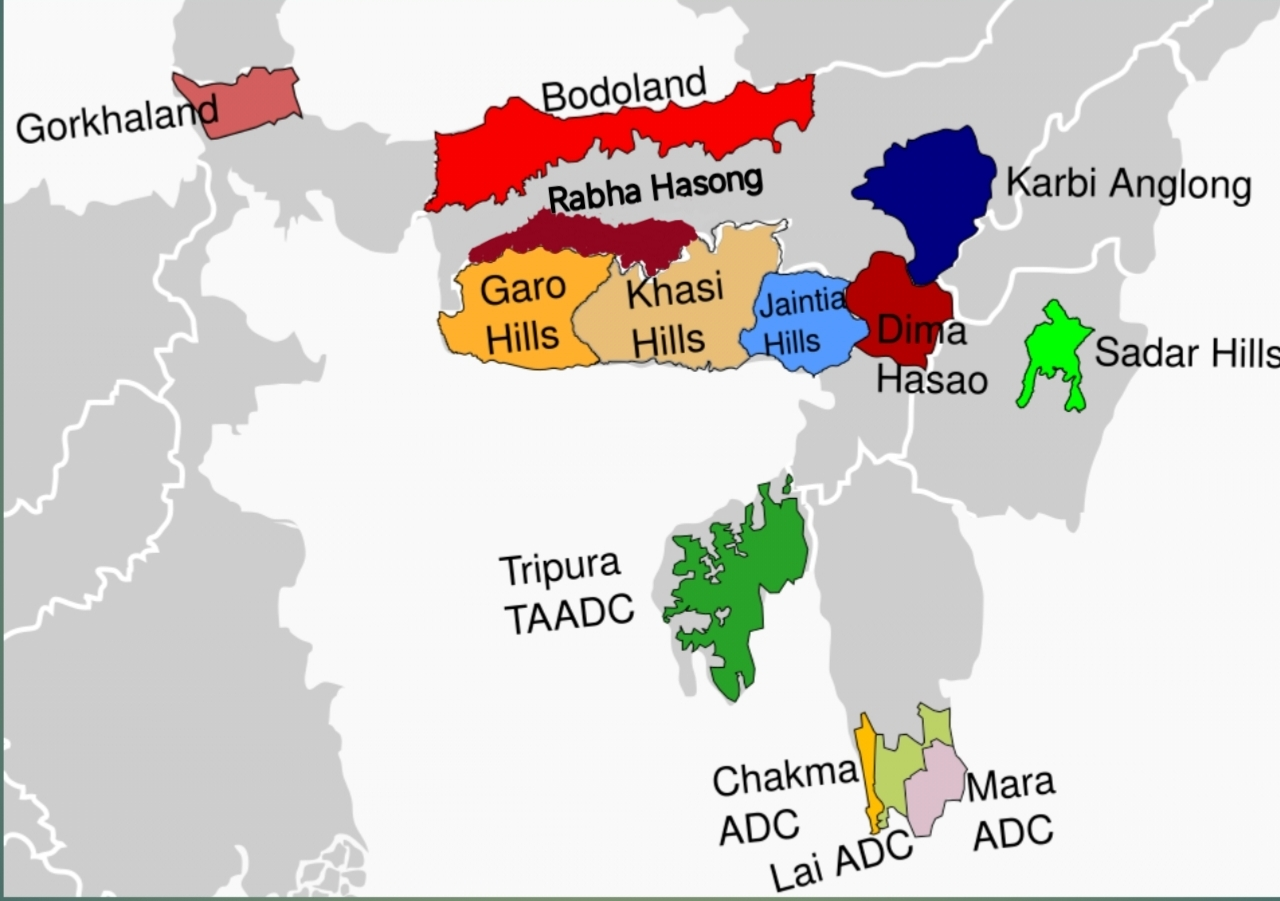
Autonomous councils in North East India

In India, there are autonomously administered territories for Scheduled Tribes, administered by representatives of those tribes. The Sixth Schedule of the Constitution of India allows for the formation of Autonomous District Councils and Autonomous Regional Councils in Assam, Meghalaya, Mizoram, and Tripura, granting them autonomy within their respective territories. Currently, there are 10 Autonomous District Councils across these four states. In these areas, Acts of Parliament and state legislation do not apply.

Additionally, other autonomous councils, created by individual states through state legislation, exist in Northeast India, Ladakh, and West Bengal. Unlike those under the Sixth Schedule, these councils are subject to parliamentary and state laws.

== Powers and competencies ==
=== Executive and legislative powers ===
Under the provisions of the Sixth Schedule of the Constitution of India, autonomous district councils can make laws, rules and regulations in the following areas:

- Land management
- Forest management
- Water resources
- Agriculture and cultivation
- Formation of village councils
- Public health
- Sanitation
- Village and town level policing
- Appointment of traditional chiefs and headmen
- Inheritance of property
- Marriage and divorce
- Social customs
- Money lending and trading
- Mining and minerals

=== Judicial powers ===
Autonomous district councils have powers to form courts to hear cases where both parties are members of Scheduled Tribes and the maximum sentence is less than 5 years in prison.

=== Taxation and revenue ===
Autonomous district councils have powers to levy taxes, fees and tolls on: building and land, animals, vehicles, boats, entry of goods into the area, roads, ferries, bridges, employment and income and general taxes for the maintenance of schools and roads.

== Constitutional autonomous councils ==
There are 10 Autonomous District Councils created by the Sixth Schedule of the Constitution of India:

State	Council	Headquarters	Formation	Last Election	Ruling Party
Assam	Bodoland	Kokrajhar	2003	September 2025	BPF
Assam	Dima Hasao	Haflong	1952	January 2024	BJP
Assam	Karbi Anglong	Diphu	1952	June 2022	BJP
Meghalaya	Garo Hills	Tura	1973	Vacant	
Meghalaya	Jaintia Hills	Jowai	1973	February 2025	NPP
Meghalaya	Khasi Hills	Shillong	1973	February 2025	VPP
Mizoram	Lai	Lawngtlai	1972	December 2025	MNF
Mizoram	Mara	Siaha	1972	May 2022	BJP
Mizoram	Chakma	Kamalanagar	1972	May 2023	BJP
Tripura	Tripura Tribal Areas	Khumulwng	1982	April 2026	TMP

== Statutory autonomous councils ==
Some states have created autonomous councils by an Act of their state legislatures.

State	Body	Headquarters	Formation	Last Election	Ruling Party
Assam	Rabha Hasong	Dudhnoi	1995	April 2025	RHJM
Assam	Mising	Dhemaji	1995	November 2026	TBD
Assam	Sonowal Kachari	Dibrugarh	2005	November 2026	TBD
Assam	Thengal Kachari	Titabar	2005	2022	BJP
Assam	Deori	Narayanpur	2005	2022	BJP
Assam	Tiwa	Morigaon	1995	2020	Vacant
Assam	Moran	Tinsukia	2020		Vacant
Assam	Matak	Chring Gaon	2020		Vacant
Assam	Bodo Kachari	Simen Chapori	2020		Vacant
Assam	Kamtapur	Abhayapuri	2020		Vacant
Manipur	Chandel	Chandel	1971	2015	Vacant
Manipur	Churachandpur	Churachandpur	1971	2015	Vacant
Manipur	Sadar Hills	Kangpokpi	1971	2015	Vacant
Manipur	Manipur North	Senapati	1971	2015	Vacant
Manipur	Tamenglong	Tamenglong	1971	2015	Vacant
Manipur	Ukhrul	Ukhrul	1971	2015	Vacant
Mizoram	Sinlung	Aizawl	2018	2024	MNF
Ladakh	Kargil	Kargil	2003	December 2026	TBD
Ladakh	Leh	Leh	1995	December 2026	TBD
Ladakh	Nubra	Diskit	2026	December 2026	TBD
Ladakh	Zanskar	Padum	2026	December 2026	TBD
Ladakh	Changthang	Nyoma	2026	December 2026	TBD
Ladakh	Sham	Khalatse	2026	December 2026	TBD
Ladakh	Drass	Drass	2026	December 2026	TBD
Ladakh	Sankoo	Sankoo	2026	December 2026	TBD
West Bengal	Gorkhaland	Darjeeling	2012	2022	BGPM

== De facto self-governing areas ==
=== North Sentinel Island ===
North Sentinel Island is situated in the island chain of the Andaman and Nicobar Islands which is a union territory of India. It is home to the Sentinelese people, who are among some of the world's last uncontacted peoples. They reject any contact with other people and are among the last people to remain virtually untouched by modern civilization. There has never been any treaty with the people of the island nor any record of a physical occupation.

The Andaman and Nicobar Administration has stated that they have no intention of interfering with the Sentinelese's lifestyle or habitat. Although the island is likely to have suffered seriously from the effects of the December 2004 tsunami, the survival of the Sentinelese was confirmed when, some days after the event, an Indian government helicopter observed several of them, who shot arrows at the hovering aircraft to repel it.

Although this has not been done with any formal treaty, the official policy of minimal interference has ensured that they have de facto autonomy and sovereignty over their island under the framework of the central and local governments.

== See also ==
- Administrative divisions of India
- States and union territories of India
- List of autonomous areas by country
