= 2019 Jaintia Hills Autonomous District Council election =

Election in Meghalaya, India

2014 Jaintia Hills Autonomous District Council election
- 27 February 2019

29 out of 30 seats in the Jaintia Hills Autonomous District Council 15 seats needed for a majority

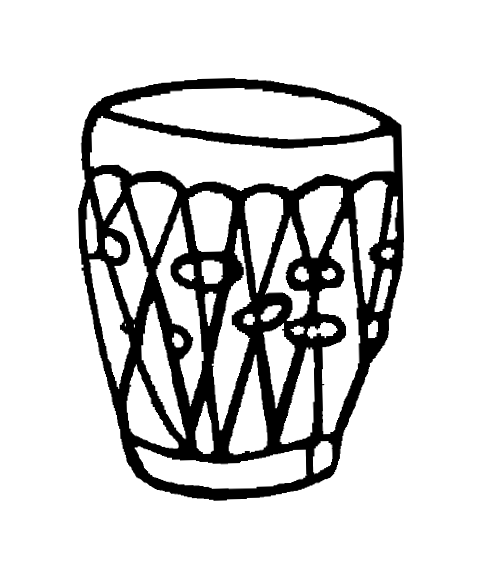

	First party	Second party	Third party
Party	NPP	UDP	INC
Seats won	12	10	4
Chief Executive Member
THOMBOR SHIWAT
NPP

Elections to the Jaintia Hills Autonomous District Council (JHADC) were held on 27 February 2019. The votes were counted on 2 March 2019 with the NPP emerging as the largest party alliance in the council with 12 and its ally UDP with 10 seats respectively.

== Schedule ==
Election Event	Date	Time	Day
Last date for filing nomination	07/02/2019	Before 3:00 pm	Thursday
Scrutiny of nomination	08/02/2019	After 3:00 pm	Friday
Last date of withdrawal of candidature	09/02/2019		Saturday
Date of polling	27/02/2019		Wednesday
Date of counting	02/03/2019		Saturday

== Results ==
The counting was held on 2 March 2019. The NPP emerged single largest party by winning 12 seats.

=== By Party ===
Party	Popular vote		Seats		
Party	Vote	%	Contested	Won	+/-
Indian National Congress (INC)				4	
National People's Party (NPP)				12	
United Democratic Party (UDP)				10	
Independent (IND)				3	
None of the above (NOTA)			N/A		
Total				29	N/A

=== By Constituency ===
No.	Constituency	Winner	Party	Margin
1	WAR EAST	GILLROY TARIANG	NPP	95
2	WAR CENTRAL	HOLANDO LAMIN	INC	52
3	WAR WEST	HET POHTHMI	NPP	87
4	SOHMYNTING KHLIEHTYRSHI	LAKHON DKHAR	INDEPENDENT	554
5	MUKHLA-WAHIAJER	AILAD BHOI	INDEPENDENT	250
6	UMMULONG-MOODYMMAI	JESSE SUIAM	NPP	657
7	NONGBAH	LAKHON BIAM	UDP	1106
8	NARTIANG-UMLADANG	THOMBOR SHIWAT	NPP	1441
9	NONGJNGI	EVENING STAR TERON	NPP	978
10	MYNSNGAD-KHANDULI	DAWAN LYNGDOH	UDP	290
11	SHILIANG MYNTANG	RUDA IOO TANG	NPP	2432
12	BARATO MUKROH	AIBORLANG SHADAP	INC	78
13	SAPHAI	HABAHUN DKHAR	NPP	759
14	MOWKAIAW	WINNING GARLAND SUNGOH	UDP	576
15	RALIANG	ROBINUS SYNGKON	NPP	870
16	SHANGPUNG	J. TREILANG SUCHIANG	UDP	337
17	JOWAI NORTH	BRIGHT STAR CHYRMANG	NPP	1269
18	JOWAI CENTRAL	AWHAI ANDREW SHULLAI	INC	2747
19	JOWAI SOUTH	SARON PASWETH	NPP	241
20	MUTHLONG SOHKYMPHOR	LOMRIS LYNGOH	UDP	512
21	TUBER	LASKY RYMBAI	UDP	100
22	MUSNIANG RNGAD	PHASMON DKHAR	NPP	405
23	RYMBAI KHLIEHRIAT	FINELYNES BAREH	UDP	1110
24	SUTNGA NARWAN	SEIBORLANG SHADAP	NPP	521
25	SUTNGA NONGKHLIEH	RICHARD SINGH LYNGDOH	INDEPENDENT	181
26	SUMER	KRISON LANGSTANG	UDP	3
27	SAIPUNG	ARBOR HIMA DARNEI	INC	594
28	NARPUH	EMLANGKY LAMARE	UDP	33
29	BATAW LAKADONG	SANKEY SHANGPUNG	UDP	523
