= List of Assam state symbols =

This is a list of state symbols of the State of Assam in India, as accredited by the Government of Assam.

== State Symbols ==
| Title | Symbol | Image | Notes |
|---|---|---|---|
| State banner | Banner of Assam অসম চৰকাৰ; Government of Assam | | Assam does not have an officially recognised state flag; the Government of Assam can be represented by a banner displaying the state seal on a plain field. |
| State seal | Emblem of Assam অসম চৰকাৰ; Government of Assam | | The state seal is carried on official correspondence of the Government of Assam and is listed on the state's official portal as the "State Seal" rather than a formal coat of arms. |
| State song | O Mur Apunar Dekh অ' মোৰ আপোনাৰ দেশ; O My Endearing Country | | Written by Lakshminath Bezbaroa, O Mur Apunar Dekh is listed by the Government of Assam as the state song and is sung at official functions across the state. |
| State motto | Joi Aai Ôxom জয় আই অসম; Hail Mother Assam | | Joi Aai Ôxom is an invocation to Assam personified as a mother goddess, and is the state's officially accredited motto. |
| State language | Assamese অসমীয়া Axomiya | | Assamese is the official language of Assam and the easternmost Indo-Aryan language, written in the Assamese alphabet. |
| State literary society | Assam Sahitya Sabha অসম সাহিত্য সভা Assam Literary Society | | Founded in 1917, the Assam Sahitya Sabha is the state's officially recognised apex literary body, promoting Assamese language and literature. |
| State festival | Bihu বিহু Bihu | | Bihu is celebrated three times a year—Bohag Bihu (April), Kati Bihu (October) and Magh Bihu (January)—marking successive stages of the agricultural calendar, and is listed as Assam's official state festival. |
| State dance | Bihu Dance বিহু নাচ; Bihu Nas | | The Government of Assam's official portal lists Bihu dance, performed during the Bohag Bihu festival, as the state dance. |
| State flower | Foxtail orchid কপৌ ফুল; Kopou Phul; Rhynchostylis retusa | | The foxtail orchid, whose fragrant, densely packed inflorescences give it its name, is closely associated with Bohag Bihu celebrations and symbolises love and joy in Assamese culture. |
| State tree | Hollong হলং Hollong; Dipterocarpus macrocarpus | | Hollong is a tall hardwood tree of Assam's tropical evergreen forests, valued for its timber. |
| State animal | One-horned rhinoceros এশিঙীয়া গঁড় Ekhingiya Gorh; Rhinoceros unicornis | | The Indian rhinoceros is closely identified with Kaziranga National Park, which holds the majority of the world's wild population, and is classified as Vulnerable by the IUCN Red List. |
| State bird | White-winged wood duck দেওহাঁহ; Deohaah; Asarcornis scutulata | | The white-winged wood duck is a rare, forest-dwelling waterfowl of Assam's tropical evergreen habitats, classified as Endangered by the IUCN Red List. |
| State fruit | Kaji Nemu কাজী নেমু Kaji Nemu; Citrus limon | | A GI-tagged variety of lemon indigenous to Assam, Kaji Nemu was declared the state fruit by a state cabinet decision on 12 February 2024, announced in the Assam Legislative Assembly by agriculture minister Atul Bora. |

== See also ==
- List of Indian state symbols
- Emblems of Indian States
