= Dudhnai Assembly constituency =

Constituency of the Assam legislative assembly in India

Dudhnai
- Constituency No. 15 for the Assam Legislative Assembly

Constituency details
- Country: India
- Region: Northeast India
- State: Assam
- District: Goalpara
- Lok Sabha constituency: Guwahati
- Established: 1962
- Reservation: ST

Member of Legislative Assembly
- 16th Assam Legislative Assembly
- Incumbent Tankeswar Rabha
- Party: Bharatiya Janata Party
- Alliance: National Democratic Alliance
- Elected year: 2026
- Preceded by: Jadab Sawargiary

Dudhnai Assembly constituency is one of the 126 assembly constituencies of Assam Legislative Assembly, Assam, India. Dudhnai is part of the Guwahati Lok Sabha constituency.

== Members of Legislative Assembly ==
Election	Name	Party
1962	Hakim Chandra Rabha	Indian National Congress
1967	Sarat Chandra Rabha	Communist Party of India
1972	Anandi Bala Rabha	Indian National Congress
1978	Jagat Chandra Patgiri	Janata Party
1983	Jagat Chandra Patgiri	Indian National Congress
1985	Akan Chandra Rabha	Independent
1991	Jagat Chandra Patgiri	Indian National Congress
1996	Akan Chandra Rabha	Asom Gana Parishad
2001	Pranoy Rabha	Indian National Congress
2006	Deben Daimary	Indian National Congress
2011	Sibcharan Basumatary	Indian National Congress
2016	Dipak Rabha	Bharatiya Janata Party
2021	Jadab Sawargiary	Indian National Congress
2026	Tankeswar Rabha	Bharatiya Janata Party

== Election results ==
=== 2026 ===
2026 Assam Legislative Assembly election: Dudhnai
Party	Candidate	Votes	%	±%
BJP	Tankeswar Rabha	100,353	63.58	+20.83
INC	Kishor Kumar Brahma	52,716	33.40	−9.06
NOTA	NOTA	1,591	1.01	+0.25
Margin of victory		47,637	30.18	+29.47
Turnout		1,57,848	89.30	+2.22
Rejected ballots				
Registered electors				
BJP gain from INC		Swing	+20.12	

=== 2021 ===
2021 Assam Legislative Assembly election: Dudhnai
Party	Candidate	Votes	%	±%
INC	Jadab Sawargiary	78,551	43.46	+11.40
BJP	Shyamjit Rabha	77,275	42.75	−7.22
Independent	Dipak Kumar Rabha	16,487	9.12	
Voters Party International	Borjit Boro	2,462	1.36	
Independent	Batsrang G. Momin	1,475	0.82	
NOTA	None of the above	1,367	0.76	+0.05
JD(U)	Diganta Kumar Rabha	1,270	0.7	
NPP	Manoj Kumar Basumatary (Munition)	1,190	0.66	
Independent	Anil Rabha	678	0.38	
Majority		1,276	0.71	−17.20
Turnout		1,80,755	87.08	−0.82
Registered electors		2,07,571		+14.01
INC gain from BJP		Swing	-6.51	

=== 2016 ===
2016 Assam Legislative Assembly election: Dudhnai
Party	Candidate	Votes	%	±%
BJP	Dipak Rabha	79,983	49.97	
INC	Sibcharan Basumatary	51,316	32.06	
AIUDF	Meera Basumatary	11,305	7.06	
Independent	Kangkan Khakhalary	7,278	4.54	
Independent	Deben Daimary	2,936	1.83	
CPI	Bhupendra Rabha	1,567	0.97	
Independent	Tharman Momin	1,413	0.88	
RPI(A)	Rajeswar Rabha	1,210	0.75	
Independent	Rexstar Sangma	1,054	0.65	
Independent	Stindro Marak	850	0.53	
NOTA	None of the above	1,142	0.71	
Majority		28,667	17.91	
Turnout		1,60,054	87.90	
Registered electors		1,82,066		
BJP gain from INC		Swing		

== See also ==
- List of constituencies of the Assam Legislative Assembly
