= Moran Autonomous Council =

Type
- Type: Autonomous administrative divisions of India

Leadership
- Chief Executive Member: Dipon Moran
- Seats: 25

Meeting place
- Tinsukia

Moran Autonomous Council is an autonomous council in the Indian state of Assam, for development and protection of ethnic Moran people. It was formed in 2020.

== About ==
The Moran people are indigenous people living primarily in the Tinsukia district of Assam. The Moran Autonomous Council Bill 2020 was tabled in Assam Legislative Assembly on 24 March 2020 and it was passed in September 2020 without any objection from the opposition parties.

== Administration ==
An elected Moran Autonomous Council will consist of 25 members of whom 22 of elected directly and three are nominated by the Governor. In January 2021, the Assam State Government said it would appoint 25 interim members to the Moran Autonomous Council as elections to the autonomous council can't be done before the 2021 Assam Legislative Assembly election. Dipon Moran is the Interim Chief Executive Member of the council.

== See also ==
- Karbi Anglong Autonomous Council
- Rabha Hasong Autonomous Council
- Kamatapur Autonomous Council
- Bodo Kachari Welfare Autonomous Council
