= Matak Autonomous Council =

Administrative division of India

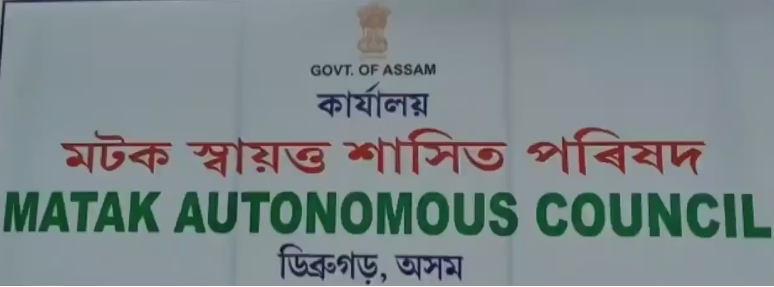

Type
- Type: Autonomous administrative divisions of India

Meeting place
- Chring Gaon

The Matak Autonomous Council is an autonomous administrative division of India in the Indian state of Assam, for development and protection of ethnic Matak people. It was formed in 2020.

== Description ==
The Matak people are indigenous people living primarily in the Dibrugarh, Tinsukia and Sivasagar districts of Assam. The Matak Autonomous Council Bill 2020 was tabled in the Assam Legislative Assembly on 24 March 2020, and it was passed in September 2020 without any objection from the opposition parties.

== Administration ==
The Matak Autonomous Council consists of 25 members. 22 of these members are elected directly, and three members are nominated by the Governor.

In January 2021, the Assam State Government said it would constitute interim councils for Matak Autonomous Council as elections to the autonomous council could not be completed before the 2021 Assam Legislative Assembly election.

== See also ==
- Matak
- Moran Autonomous Council
- Bodo Kachari Welfare Autonomous Council
