= Jaintia Hills Autonomous District Council =

Local government body in Meghalaya, northeastern India

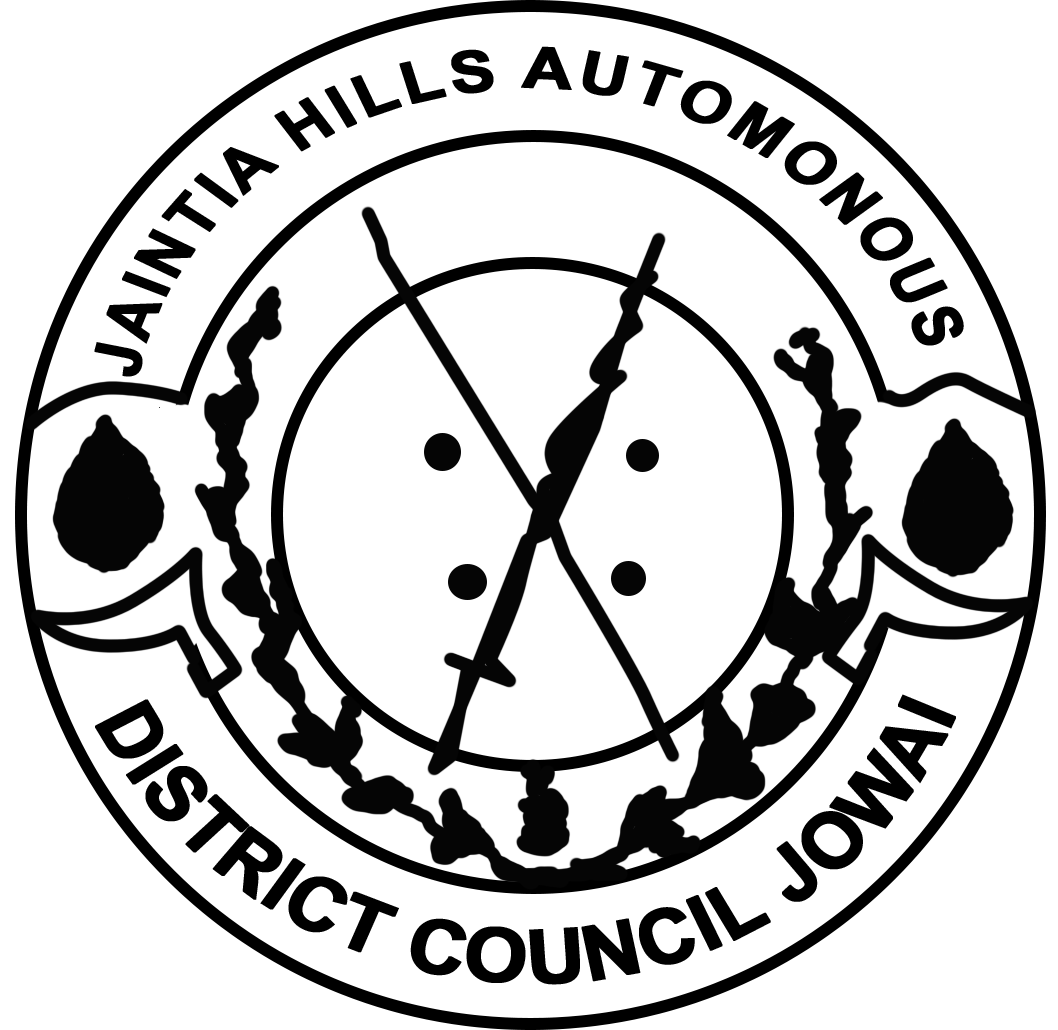

Type
- Type: Autonomous District Council

Leadership
- Chair: Dr. Sankey Shangpung, NPP
- Chief Executive Member: Thombor Shiwat, NPP

Structure
- Seats: 30 Councillors (29 Elected + 1 Nominated)
- Political groups: Executive Council (EC) (16) MDA (16): NPP (13); UDP (3); Opposition (11): VPP (8); INC (3); Others (2): IND (2); Nominated (1): NOM (1)

Elections
- Voting system: First-past-the-post
- Last election: 21 February 2025
- Next election: 2030

Meeting place
- Jowai, Meghalaya

Website
- jhadc.nic.in

North Eastern autonomous divisions

Jaintia Hills Autonomous District Council (JHADC) is an autonomous district council in the state of Meghalaya in India. It is one of the three autonomous district councils within Meghalaya, and one of twenty-five autonomous regions of India. Present Jaintia hills was a part of historical Jaintia Kingdom. It was formed as the Jowai Autonomous District Council on 23 November 1964 from the Jowai Subdivision of the United Khasi-Jaintia Hills District – adopting its current name on 14 June 1973.

The total area of the Jaintia Hills Autonomous District Council is 3,819 km^{2} having a population of 395,124 as of 2011.

== History ==
The Jaintia Kingdom was ruled by the Syiems from the beginning of the 16th century but their rule ended in the year 1835 A.D when the British annexed the Jaintia parganas in the plain and the then Syiem of Jaintiapur Rajendra Singh handed over the hills areas also to them and as such, from the year 1835 the whole Jaintia Kingdom came under the British rule until India achieved independence on 15 August 1947. During the British rule, the Jaintia Hills formed part of the Khasi Jaintia Hills District in the status of a Civil Sub-Division known as Jowai Civil Sub-Division.

Consequent on the independence of India from the British rule, the Syiems of 25 Khasi States signed the Instrument of Accession and these States came under the administration of the District which renamed as United Khasi & Jaintia Hills District. The Constitution of India which was proclaimed in the year 1950 has under Article 244(2) a provision for administration of tribal areas in the then State of Assam as per Sixth Schedule to the Constitution. The United Khasi & Jaintia Hills Autonomous District Council was then created in the year 1951 under the Sixth Schedule with headquarters at Shillong and a Branch Office at Jowai. A separate Autonomous District Council was created for the Jaintia Hills by the then Govt. of Assam in the year 1964 bearing the name of Jowai Autonomous District Council vide Notification No. TAD/R/50/64 dated 23.11.1964. After Meghalaya achieved full-fledged statehood on 21 January 1972 the Jowai Civil Sub-Division was upgraded into a full-fledged Civil District in the same year in the name of Jaintia Hills District. The Jowai Autonomous District Council was subsequently renamed as the Jaintia Hills Autonomous District Council vide Notification dated 14.6.1973.

Hence, the Jaintia Hills Autonomous District Council under the Sixth Schedule to the Constitution and a Civil District under the charge of a Deputy Commissioner administered the same geographical area and by and large the same inhabitants playing their respective role and functions until 31 July 2013 when the Govt. of Meghalaya created a new Civil District, viz: East Jaintia Hills District with headquarters at Khliehriat and the parent District with headquarters at Jowai was renamed as West Jaintia Hills District. Now the Jaintia Hills Autonomous District Council covers two Civil Districts under its jurisdiction.

== Elections ==
Various elections are as follows:

- 2019 Jaintia Hills Autonomous District Council election
- 2025 Jaintia Hills Autonomous District Council election

== Executive Wing ==
Heading the Executive Wing of the ADC is the executive committee whose duties are similar to those of the Cabinet of the State. The head of the executive committee, that is, the Chief Executive Member is elected by majority votes by the Council in Session and such election is to be approved by the Governor of the State. The Chief Executive Member then nominates Members of the executive committee from amongst the members of the council. The executive committee remains in Office as long as they enjoy the majority support of Members of the council.

Departments under the executive committee, Jaintia Hills ADC: To administer the various functions as envisaged under the Sixth Schedule, the Jaintia Hills Autonomous District Council has created the following Departments:

1. General Department.
2. Finance and Accounts Department.
3. Land Revenue & Land Reform Department.
4. Land Record and Land Settlement Department.
5. Taxation Department.
6. Forest Department.
7. Political Department.
8. Civil Works Department.
9. Education Department.
10. Market, Agriculture Soil & Fishery Department.
11. Stationery & Printing Department.
12. Judicial Department.
13. Legislative Department

== Legislative Wing ==
The members of the Council hold regular session once every four months. The Annual Budget of the ADC has to be passed by the majority votes by the Council in session. The other duties of the Council in session are to legislate and enact laws and regulations on such powers as conferred by the Sixth Schedule. Bills on laws and regulations passed by the Council in session are sent to the Governor of the State for his assent or approval.

To run the affairs of the Legislative Secretariat, the Council in session elects a chairman and deputy chairman whose duties are similar to the speaker and the Deputy Speaker of the State Legislature. The Office of the Legislative is looked after by officers and staff headed by the Secretary Legislative.

The Legislative Secretariat looks after the administrative matters pertaining to the legislative functions of the Jaintia Hills Autonomous District Council.

== Judiciary Wing ==
Administration of justice in respect of tribals within the Jaintia Hills Autonomous District is being look after by the District Council Court and its Subordinate District Council Court constituted by the executive committee of the Jaintia Hills District Council since its inception in the year 1967 under the provisions of the United Khasi & Jaintia Hills Autonomous District (Administration of Justice) Rules 1953. These Courts are staffed by Judicial Officers having law degree and designated as Judges and Magistrates and undertake trial of both Civil and Criminal Cases arising between tribals only. These Courts follow the spirit of the Code of Civil Procedure 1908 and the Code of Criminal Procedure 1973 and they fall within the judicial jurisdiction of the Meghalaya High Court. Powers on these Courts are conferred by the Governor of Meghalaya under paragraph 5 of the Sixth Schedule to the Constitution of India. However, in respect of Civil and Criminal Cases arising between tribal and nontriabal or between non-tribals within the Jaintia Hills Autonomous Districts, the same are being look after by the Deputy Commissioner and the District & Session Judge, Jaintia Hills District with their respected Subordinates in exercise of the powers conferred under the administration of justice Rules, 1937. These Courts also falls under the judicial jurisdiction of the Meghalaya High Court.

In exercise of the powers conferred on it by paragraph 4 of the Sixth Schedule to the Constitution of India the Jaintia Hills Autonomous District Council, under the provision of the United Khasi & Jaintia Hills District(Administration of Justice)Rules,1953, constituted the following classes of Courts:

1. Village Courts
2. Subordinate District Council Courts
3. District Council Court

=== Village Courts ===
These Courts are constituted for the villages within the Elaka for the trial of suits and cases between tribals. It is being staffed by the Dolloi and other members elected by the Durbar Elaka. In Civil Cases the Village Courts is empowered to award costs and compensations. In Criminal Cases it is empowered to impose a fine of Rs.50 only. It has no power to pass a sentence of imprisonment. The Village Courts tries suits and cases in accordance with the Customary laws/practice of the village.

=== Subordinate District Council Courts ===
These Courts are constituted for the trial of suits and cases for the whole of Jaintia Hills Autonomous District not triable by Village Courts to be presided over by Judicial Officers designated as Magistrates. In Civil Cases it has got unlimited power and in Criminal Cases it has been invested with powers up to seven years imprisonment. It also hear appeals (Civil and Criminal) from the decisions of the Village Courts. At present there are two Subordinate District Council Courts at Jowai and they are trying both Civil and Criminal Cases arising from different parts of Jaintia Hills Autonomous District comprising East and West Jaintia Hills District. Many of these Cases have been disposed of from time to time.

=== District Council Court ===
This Court is constituted for the trial of suits and cases not triable by any Council Courts. It exercise jurisdiction within the whole of Jaintia Hills Autonomous District and is presided over by judicial Officer designated as the Judge. In Civil Cases it has got unlimited powers and in Criminals Cases it has been invested with ten years power of imprisonment. It also hears appeals and revisions (Civil and Criminal) from the decisions of the Subordinate District Council Courts. Appeals and revisions against its Orders/Judgements lies to the Meghalaya High Court.

== Demographics ==
Religion of Jaintia Autonomous Council (2011)
1. Christianity (68.7%)
2. Niamtre/Niam Khasi (27.2%)
3. Hinduism (3.15%)
4. Islam (0.42%)
5. Religion not stated (0.38%)
6. Buddhism (0.07%)
7. Jainism (0.01%)
8. Sikhism (0.01%)
Languages of Jaintia Autonomous Council (2011)
1. Pnar (78.8%)
2. War (9.57%)
3. Khasi (6.50%)
4. Others (5.12%)

== See also ==
- Hill tribes of Northeast India
- North Eastern Council
