= Akan Chandra Rabha =

Indian politician

Akan Chandra Rabha is an Asom Gana Parishad politician from Assam, India. He was elected to the Assam Legislative Assembly in the 1985 and 1996 elections from Dudhnai constituency.
