= Kaudwane =

- Village
- Location in Botswana
- Coordinates: 23°23′6″S 24°39′35″E
- Country: Botswana
- District: Kweneng District

Population (2001)
  - Total: 551

Kaudwane is a village in Kweneng District of Botswana. The village is located in Kalahari Desert, around 220 km north-west of Gaborone, and it has a primary school. The population was 551 in 2001 census.
