= Rabha Hasong Joutha Mancha =

Political party in Assam, India

- Abbreviation: RHJM
- President: Tankeswar Rabha
- Secretary: Ramakanta Rabha
- Headquarters: Dudhnai, Goalpara district, Assam
- ECI Status: Regional Party
- Alliance: NEDA
- Seats in Rajya Sabha: 0 / 245
- Seats in Lok Sabha: 0 / 543
- Seats in Assam Legislative Assembly: 3 / 126
- Seats in Rabha Hasong Autonomous Council: 27 / 38

Rabha Hasong Joutha Mancha (RHJM) is a regional political party in the Indian state of Assam primarily supported by the Rabha people. It plays a significant role in the governance of the Rabha Hasong Autonomous Council (RHAC), an administrative body established for the development of the Rabha people. The party is a member of the National Democratic Alliance.

== History ==
The RHJM emerged as a political coalition advocating for the rights and autonomy of the Rabha community within Assam. It has been instrumental in voicing the demand for the inclusion of the RHAC under the Sixth Schedule of the Indian Constitution. Leaders have urged the community to prioritize this goal when engaging with national political parties. The Assam government has submitted a proposal to the central government to include RHAC under the Sixth Schedule.

In January 2025, Assam Chief Minister Himanta Biswa Sarma announced that tripartite talks would be initiated between the central government, the state, and RHAC to discuss its inclusion under the Sixth Schedule.

=== Political activities ===
In the 2025 Rabha Hasong Autonomous Council elections, RHJM contested 29 out of 36 constituencies. The part secured a majority by winning 27 out of 36 seats. It's ally BJP won 6 seats.

== See also ==
- Rabha Hasong Autonomous Council
- Rabha people
