= 2025 Jaintia Hills Autonomous District Council election =

Indian local election

- 21 February 2025

29 out of 30 seats in the Jaintia Hills Autonomous District Council 15 seats needed for a majority

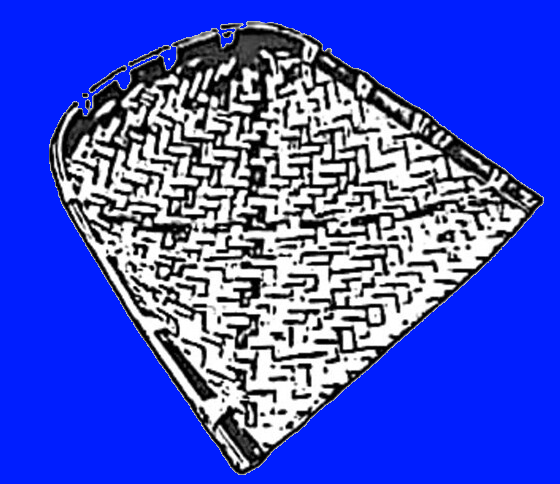

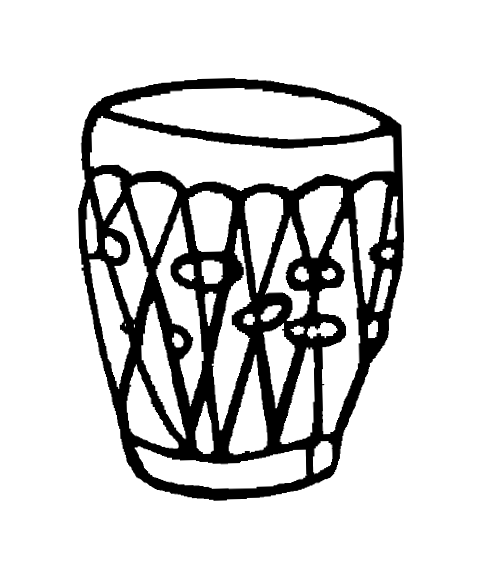

	First party	Second party	Third party
Party	NPP	VPP	UDP
Last election	12	0	10
Seats won	13	8	3
Seat change	▲1	▲8	▼7
	Fourth party	Fifth party
Party	INC	Independent
Last election	4	0
Seats won	3	2
Seat change	▼1	▲2
Chief executive member
Thombor Shiwat
MDA

Elections to the Jaintia Hills Autonomous District Council (JHADC) were held on 21 February 2025. Of the 30 seats, 29 seats were open for election and one remaining seat is nominated.

The NPP emerged as the single largest party by winning 13 seats, but fell short of the required majority of 15. It later formed the government in coalition with the UDP.

== Overview ==
About 114 candidates including 7 women participated in the election. The voter turnout was 85.58%. The highest voter turnout was recorded at Moodymmai-Nongkroh constituency (90.8%) and the lowest at Jowai-North constituency (75.21%).

== Results ==
The state ruling party NPP won 13 seats. The VPP won 8 seats and the UDP and Congress party won 3 seats. The remaining 2 seats are won by Independents.

Thombor Shiwat was elected as the Chief Executive Member and Dr. Sankey Shangpung as the new Chairman of the council.

=== Winning candidates ===
#	Constituency	Winner	Party	Votes	Margin
1	War East	Medling M Swer	UDP	4073	384
2	War Central	Jhangshaprang Pohtam	VPP	2981	431
3	War West	Het Pohthmi	NPP	3018	474
4	Sohmynting - Khlietyrshi	Madonbai Rymbai	INC	3450	988
5	Mukhla - Wahiajer	Nehimaia Lamare	VPP	4901	224
6	Ummulong - Moodymmai	Jesse Suiam	NPP	4225	433
7	Nongbah	Reformingson Lamare	NPP	3921	7
8	Nartiang-Umladang	Thombor Shiwat	NPP	4260	102
9	Nongjngi	Laiawanlamjinghun Khynriam	VPP	3711	177
10	Mynsngad-Khanduli	Pheinshwa Nanglein	NPP	3919	301
11	Shilliang Myntang	Daeimi Liam	VPP	3040	244
12	Barato-Mukroh	Aiborlang Shadap	NPP	3239	140
13	Saphai	Rikut Parein	INC	3506	289
14	Mowkaiaw	Wormanship Shadap	NPP	3787	790
15	Raliang	Bisonroy Iano	NPP	4209	984
16	Shangpung	Mihnyngkong Sutnga	NPP	4031	1247
17	Nangbah-Mihmyntdu	Gresentus Susngi	VPP	3910	1045
18	Jowai-North	Awhai Andrew Shullai	VPP	6234	4602
19	Jowai South	Moonlight Pariat	IND	3189	522
20	Muthlong - Sohkymphor	Soki Lapasam	VPP	3154	395
21	Tuber	Lasky Rymbai	UDP	3662	361
22	Musniang Rngat	Wailadameshwa Siangshai	UDP	5555	2638
23	Rymbai Khliehriat	Violet Lyngdoh	IND	5552	1835
24	Sutnga Narwan	Seiborlang Shadap	NPP	3525	857
25	Sutnga Nongkhlieh	Hambertus Nongtdu	NPP	3952	498
26	Sumer	Krison Langstang	NPP	4049	2040
27	Saipung	Lalwilliama Theite	INC	3402	299
28	Narpuh	Deivipaya T. Tongper	VPP	4014	717
29	Bataw Lakadong	Sankey Shangpung	NPP	3426	1492
