= Tankeswar Rabha =

Indian politicians (born 1973)

Assam Legislative Assembly
- Incumbent
- Assumed office 4 May 2026
- Preceded by: Seat Established
- Constituency: Dudhnai

Personal details
- Born: 1973 (age 52–53)
- Party: Bharatiya Janata Party
- Profession: Politician

Tankeswar Rabha (born 1973) is an Indian politician from Assam. He is a member of the Assam Legislative Assembly from the Dudhnai Assembly constituency, which is reserved for Scheduled Tribe community, in Goalpara district representing the Bharatiya Janata Party.

== Early life ==
Rabha is from Dudhnoi, Goalpara district, Assam. He is the son of Sitaram Rabha. He completed his Bachelor of engineering at Assam Engineering College, Assam, which is affiliated with Science and Technology University, Jalukbari, Guwahati, in 1995. He and his wife run their won businesses. He declared assets worth Rs.3 crore in his affidavit to the Election Commission of India.

== Career ==
Rabha won the Dudhnai Assembly constituency representing the Bharatiya Janata Party in the 2026 Assam Legislative Assembly election. He polled 1,00,353 votes and defeated his nearest rival, Kishore Kumar Brahma of the Indian National Congress, by a margin of 47,637 votes.
