= Dipak Rabha =

Indian politician

Dipak Rabha is a Bharatiya Janata Party politician from Assam, India. He was elected in Assam Legislative Assembly election in 2016 from Dudhnai constituency.
