= Thengal Kachari Autonomous Council =

Autonomous district council in Assam, India

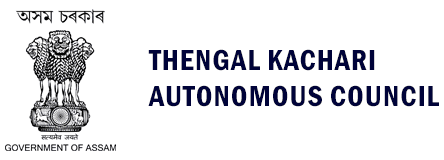

Type
- Type: Autonomous District Council
- Established: 2005

Leadership
- Chief Executive Councillor: Kumud Ch Kachari

Structure
- Seats: 22 Councillors
- Political groups: Government (17): BJP (14); AGP (3); Opposition (5): INC (4); IND (1)

Elections
- Voting system: First past the post
- Last election: January 2022
- Next election: 2027

Meeting place
- Titabar, Assam

The Thengal Kachari Autonomous Council (TKAC), is an autonomous district council for the Thengal Kachari people in the state of Assam, India.

== History ==
The council was created in 2005 by Thengal Kachari Autonomous Council Act, which was passed by the Assam Legislative Assembly.

== Structure ==
The council has 26 members of whom 22 are directly elected and 4 are appointed by the Governor of Assam on behalf of the central Government of India. The council elects a Chief Executive Councillor who nominates an executive committee.

== Election ==
At the most recent election, held in January 2022; the Bharatiya Janata Party (BJP) won 14 seats, the Indian National Congress won 4, the Asom Gana Parishad (AGP) won 3 and one seat was won by an independent. The BJP went on to form a coalition executive with the AGP with Pratap Kachari as Chief Executive Councillor.

== See also ==
- Sonowal Kachari
- Bodo Kachari
