= Sonowal Kachari Autonomous Council =

Autonomous district council in Assam, India

Type
- Type: Autonomous District Council
- Established: 2005

Leadership
- Chief Executive Councillor: Dipu Ranjan Markari

Structure
- Seats: 30
- Political groups: Government: BJP (20); Opposition: INC (5); IND (1); Nominated: NOM (4)

Meeting place
- Dibrugarh

Website
- https://www.skacassam.in/

The Sonowal Kachari Autonomous Council (SKAC), is an autonomous district council for the Sonowal Kachari people in the state of Assam in India. The SKAC was established in 2005 by the state legislation Sonowal Kachari Autonomous Council Act, 2005.

== Structure ==
The General Council consists of 30 (thirty) members out of which 26 (twenty six) are elected members and 4 (four) members are to be nominated by the Government of Assam to give representation of those group/communities of the council area which are not otherwise represented in it. Out of 26 (twenty six) seats, 20 (twenty) shall be reserved for scheduled Tribes and 5 (five) seats shall be reserved for woman, and 1 (one) for general community. The Executive council consists of 12 councillors led by the Chief Executive Councillor.

== See also ==
- Sonowal Kachari
- Bodo Kachari
