= Kamtapur Autonomous Council =

Autonomous Administrative Region in Assam, India

Kamatapur Autonomous Council KAC
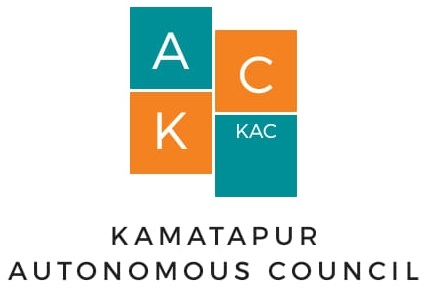

Type
- Type: Autonomous Council of the Kamatapur

Leadership
- Chairman: Hiteswar Barman
- Chief Executive Councilor: Jibesh Roy

Meeting place
- Abhayapuri, North Salmara, Bongaigaon district, Assam

Website
- Kamatapur Autonomous Council

The Kamatapur Autonomous Council is an autonomous council in the Kamatapur region of the Indian state of Assam, for development and protection of ethnic Koch Rajbongshi people. It was formed in 2020. It includes the whole of the Undivided Goalpara district, excluding Bodoland Territorial Council and Rabha Hasong Autonomous Council areas.

== History ==
The Kamatapur Autonomous Council Bill 2020 was tabled in Assam Legislative Assembly on 24 March 2020 by the BJP led NDA government and it was passed in September 2020. The bill received objections from Indian National Congress and AIUDF. Gokul Barman stepped down as Chief Executive Councilor of the Kamatapur Autonomous Council on 10 July 2021. He was succeeded by Jibesh Roy, who currently holds the position.

== Administration ==
The Kamatapur Autonomous Council consists of 30 members. 26 of these members are elected directly and 4 members are nominated by the Governor.

In January 2021, the Assam State Government said it will constitute interim councils for Kamatapur Autonomous Council as elections to the autonomous council can't be done before the 2021 Assam Legislative Assembly election. A 30 member interim council was appointed in February 2021.

== See also ==
- Kamtapur
- Autonomous administrative divisions of India
