= Deori Autonomous Council =

Autonomous district council of Assam in India

Type
- Type: Autonomous District Council
- Established: 2005

Leadership
- Chief Executive Councillor: Bhoirab Deori
- Chairman: Amrit Prova Deori
- Vice Chairman: Bhaskar Deori

Structure
- Seats: 22 Councillors
- Political groups: Government (21): BJP (19); AGP (1); IND (1); Opposition (1): INC (1)

Elections
- Voting system: 22 plurality voting
- Last election: November 2022
- Next election: 2027

Meeting place
- Narayanpur, Assam

Website
- www.dacassam.org.in

The Deori Autonomous Council (DAC) is an autonomous district council in Lakhimpur district in the state of Assam in India.

== History ==
The Deori Autonomous Council was founded in 2005 following an agreement between the Government of Assam and representatives of the Deori people who wanted greater autonomy for the area. The first election for the council were held in 2007.

== Structure ==
=== Deori Autonomous Council ===
Earlier, the Deori Autonomous Council had 20 members of which 18 are elected by the first past the post system and 2 were nominated by the Government of Assam. Of the elected seats, nine were reserved for members of scheduled tribes and three for women.

The Deori Autonomous Council (Amendment) Bill, 2021 increased the number of seats to 26, out of which 22 seats will be directly elected and 4 seats will be nominated by the Government. Out of 22 elected seats, 18 seats will be reserved for Scheduled Tribes, 3 seats will be reserved for women and 1 seat will be reserved for general category.

=== Village councils ===
Each village in the area elects a village council of 10 members of which at least five must be from the Deori community and at least one a woman. Each village council is led by a president.

== See also ==
- Deori people
