= Bodo Kachari Autonomous Council =

Bodo Kachari Welfare Autonomous Council

Type
- Type: Autonomous Council

Leadership
- Chairman: Gambaru Muchahary since 17 February 2021
- Chief Executive Member: Mihiniswar Basumatary since 17 February 2021
- Deputy Chief Executive Member: Romeo Narzary since 17 February 2021
- Seats: 40 councillors

Elections
- Voting system: 36 plurality voting
- Voting system: 4 nominated

Meeting place
- Simen Chapori, Dhemaji District, Assam

Website
- Bodo Kachari Welfare Autonomous Council

Bodo Kachari Welfare Autonomous Council, (BKWAC), is an autonomous council in the Indian state of Assam, for the development and protection of ethnic Bodo-Kachari people living in villages outside the Bodoland Territorial Region. It was formed in 2020.

== History ==
There has been a long-standing demand for a Boro Kachari Welfare Autonomous Council outside the Bodoland territorial region for the welfare of Bodo-Kachari people. Several protests were also conducted by the Bodo organizations for this. The Bodo Kachari Welfare Autonomous Council Bill, 2020 was moved in Assam legislative assembly by the Welfare of Plain Tribes and Backward Classes Minister Chandan Brahma in December 2020 and the bill was passed after a brief discussion.

== Administration ==
The Bodo Kachari Autonomous Welfare Council consists of 40 members. 36 of these members are elected directly and 4 members are nominated by the State government. Among the 36 election seats, 25 of them will be reserved for the Scheduled Tribe communities, 6 will be reserved for women of any community residing within the Council area. The 4 nominated members will be from among the communities residing within the Council area.

In January 2021, the Assam State Government said it will constitute interim councils for Bodo Kachari Autonomous Council as elections to the autonomous council can't be done before the 2021 Assam Legislative Assembly election. An interim council made up of 14 members was appointed in February 2021.

== See also ==
- Autonomous administrative divisions of India
- All Bodo Students' Union
- Bodo people
- Bodoland Territorial Region
- Bodoland Territorial Council
- Boro-language
