= Rabha Hasong Autonomous Council =

District in Assam, India

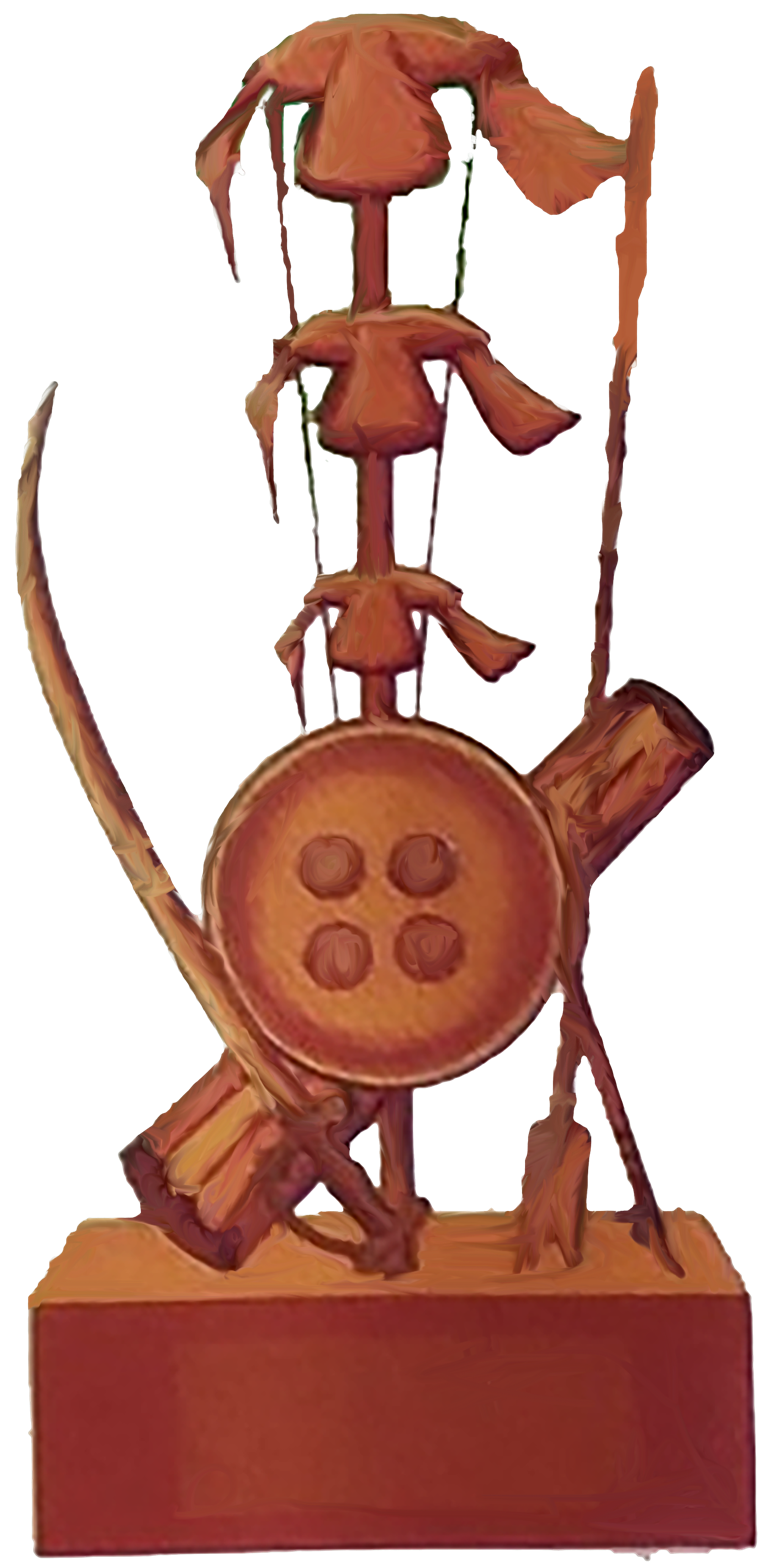

Type
- Type: Autonomous District Council

Leadership
- Chief Executive Member: Tankeswar Rabha, RHJM

Structure
- Seats: 40 Councillors (36 Elected + 4 Nominated)
- Political groups: Government (33): RHJM (27); BJP (6); Opposition (3): INC (1); IND (2); Nominated (4): NOM (4)

Elections
- Last election: 2 April 2025
- Next election: 2030

Meeting place
- Dudhnoi, Assam

Website
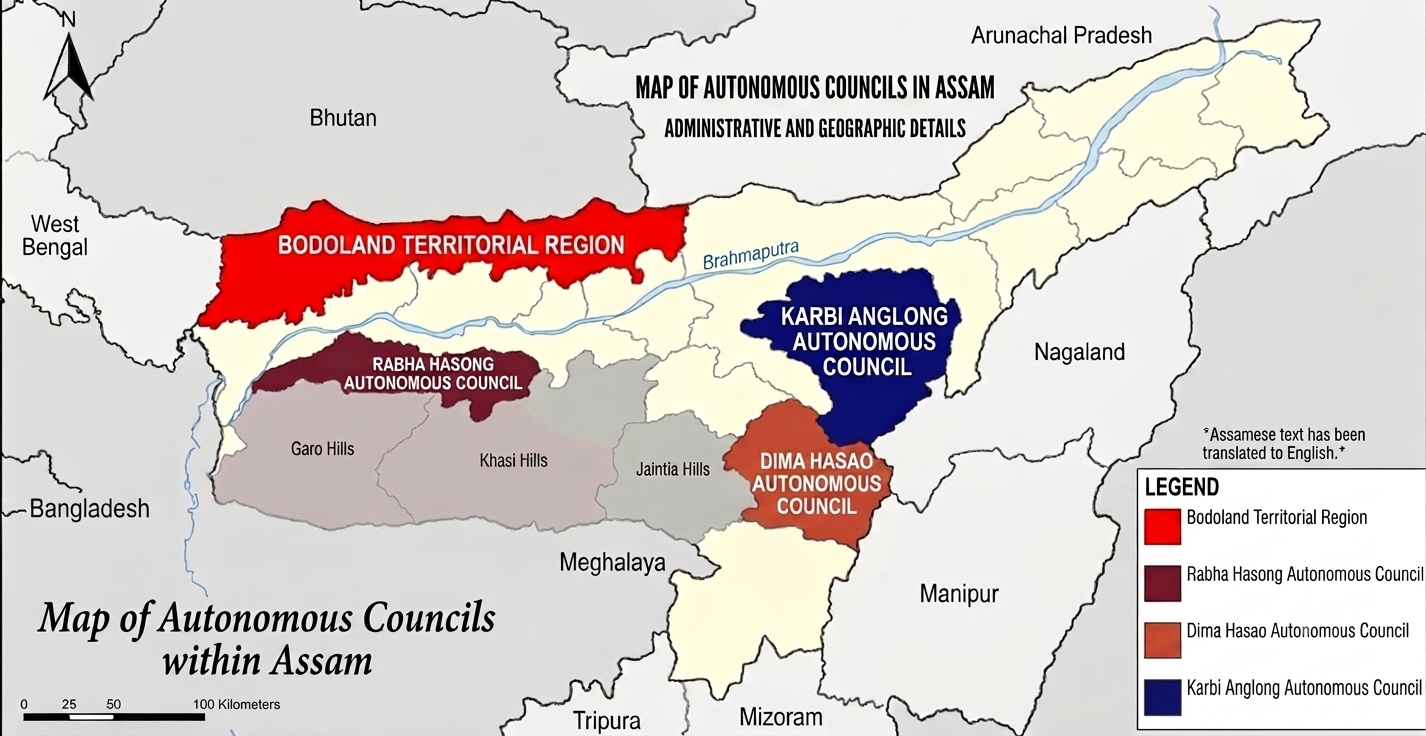
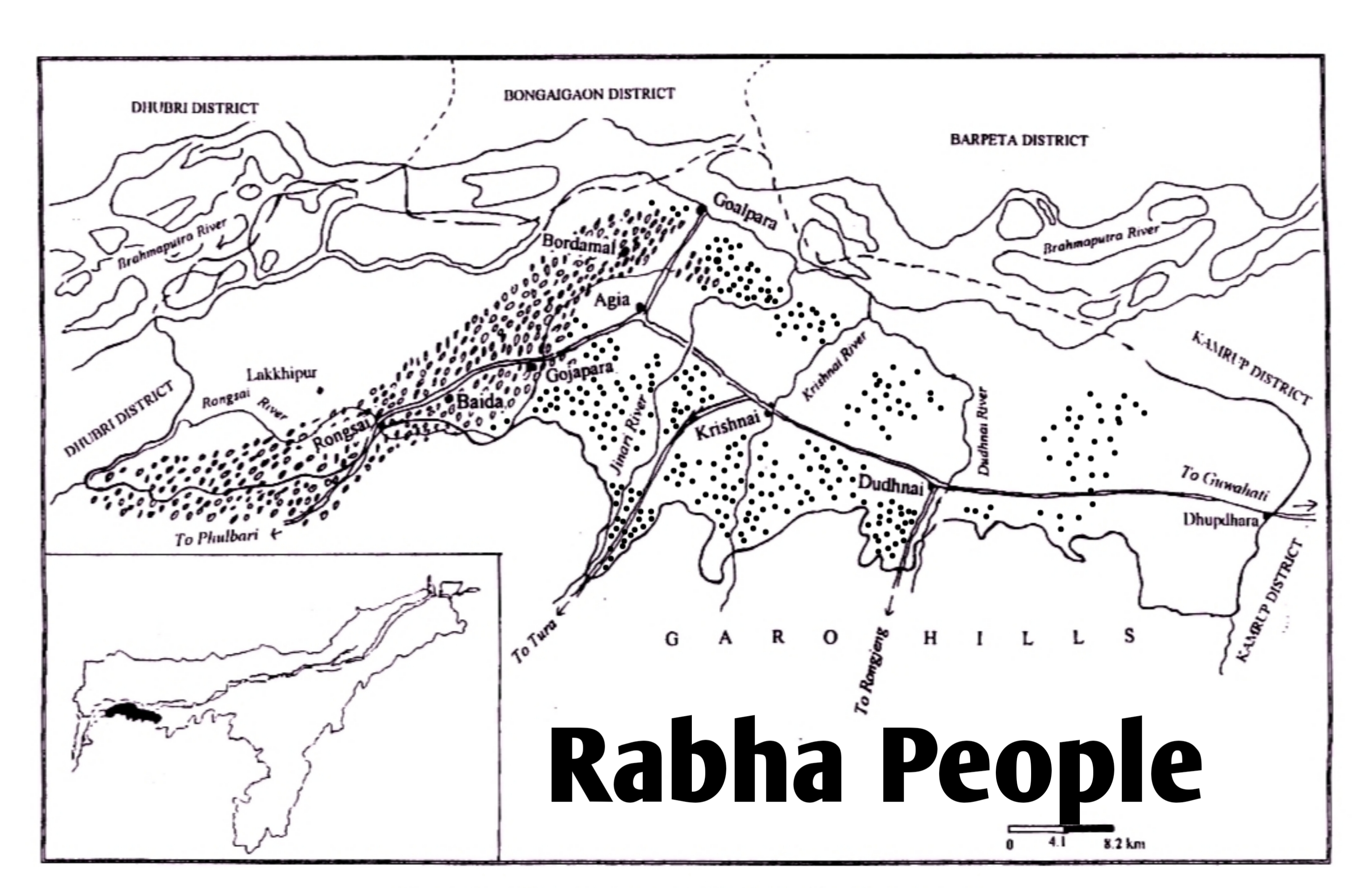
- rhac.assam.gov.in Assam Autonomous Council Rabha People

The Rabha Hasong Autonomous Council (RHAC) was constituted by the Government of Assam in 1995. It was constituted for development in the areas of economic, educational, socio-cultural and ethnic identity of Rabha people residing in the council area. RHAC has different tribes such as Rabha, Bodo, Garo, Hajong etc. The majority of the population in RHAC is Rabha. Currently the RHAC head office is located at Dudhnoi, Assam. The current chief of the RHAC is Tankeswar Rabha.

The RHAC region spans the southern bank of the mighty Brahmaputra River, extending from Jayramkuchi in Lakhipur Rev. Circle of Goalpara District to Lakhara in Palashbari Rev. Circle of Kamrup District, and from the southern bank of the Brahmaputra to the Assam border with Meghalaya (Garo Hills).

The RHAC region spans significant portions of Kamrup and Goalpara Districts, encompassing an approximate area of 6,000 square kilometers. Initially, the council area comprised 306 villages across these districts.

However, according to Government Notification No. TAD/BC/135/2005/10 dated May 17, 2005, the council's jurisdiction now spans 779 villages with a total population of 553,868 individuals. Among these, 329,671 belong to Scheduled Tribes, 15,756 to Scheduled Castes, and the remaining 208,443 are from General Castes.

== Aims and Objectives ==
The primary aim of the R.H.A.C (Rabha Hasong Autonomous Council) is to operate autonomously within the framework of the Indian constitution, striving for the advancement of the social, economic, educational, and cultural aspects of the Rabha, ST and other ethnic populace in the state.

The Council diligently works to preserve and promote these fundamental traits of the Rabha, ST and other ethnic community, seeking to comprehensively address the community's needs and expectations. Each proposed development scheme is tailored to elevate the community, aiming to bridge the gap between their needs and the broader national context.

Focused on reducing poverty levels and enhancing the overall well-being of Rabha, ST and other ethnic community members, the Council acknowledges the potential for more targeted, locally-focussed projects at the grassroots level, complementing the initiatives of the state and central governments.

== History ==
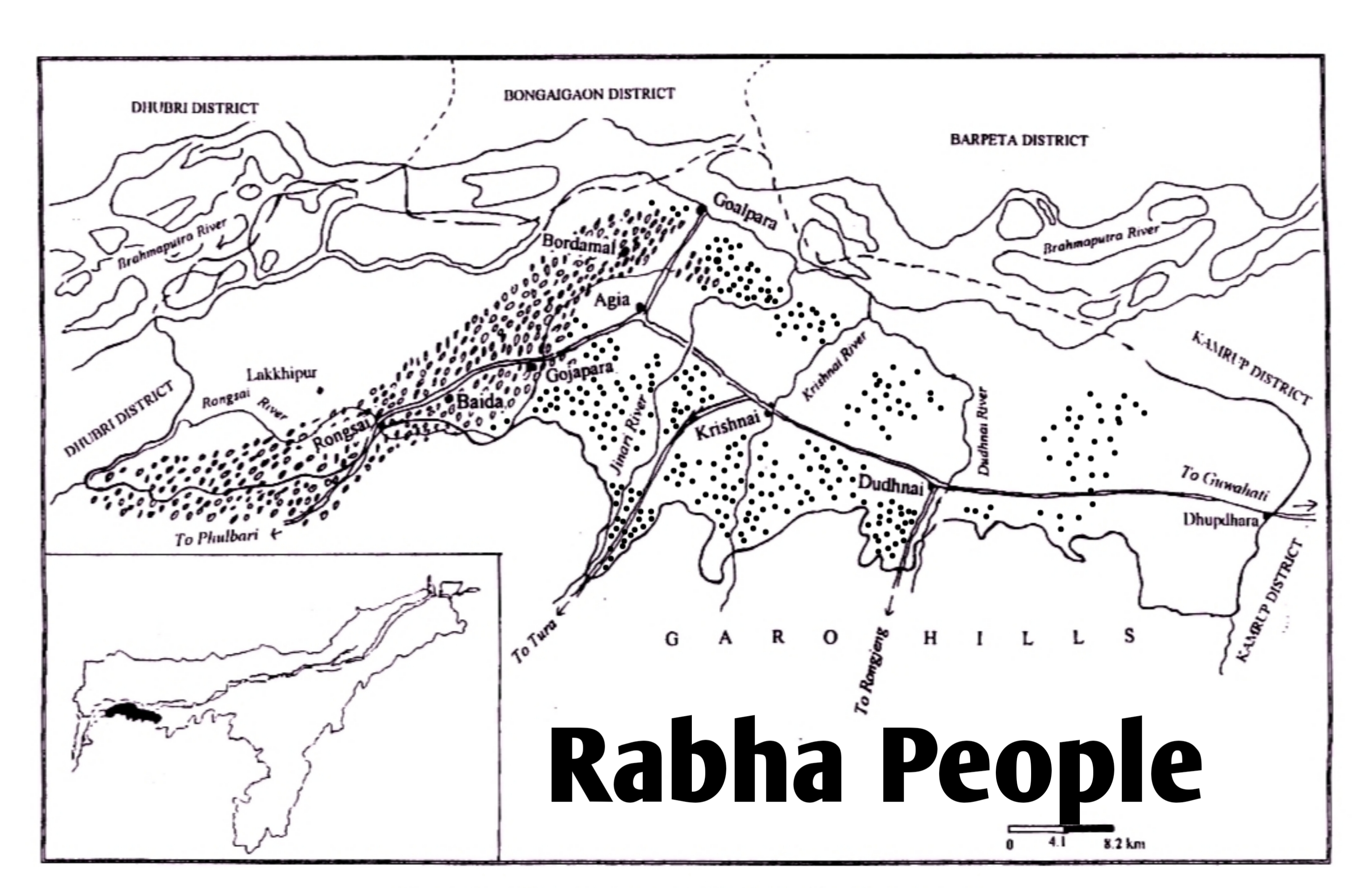
Rabha People

The Rabha Hasong Autonomous Council (RHAC) has been constituted with its headquarters at Dudhnai town. The jurisdiction of this council extends up to Rani area of Kamrup district and embraces almost the entire district of Goalpara. The autonomous council has been created to fulfill the longstanding demands of the Rabha people of the area.

The first elections was held in 2013 to constitute the General Council.

Since its inception, the RHAC has encountered a multitude of significant challenges, resembling a newborn finding its way through unfamiliar terrain. Initially without a dedicated building for offices and essential facilities, the Council has steadily progressed to meet the needs and dreams of both the Rabha people and other communities living within its jurisdiction.

Initially, the Council encompassed 306 Revenue Villages with an estimated population of 350,000. However, its jurisdiction expanded to 779 Revenue Villages following Government Notification No. TAD/BC/135/2005/10, dated May 17, 2005. It's important to note that during its early period, there was no single window system for approving and disbursing funds to the Council, a system that was established in 2003-04.

It's noteworthy that despite the noticeably meagre flow of funds to the RHAC, which falls short of meeting the needs and aspirations of its people, the Council has persistently forged ahead. Initially, the Council was governed by government-nominated members. However, after the democratic election conducted in 2013, elected members took charge, leading to a gradual increase in the Council's fund allocation to a more reasonable status.

This Council comprises 34 major departments, each responsible for implementing genuinely need-based developmental schemes. These departments cover areas such as Education, Agriculture, Rural Roads & Bridges, Health & Family Welfare, Sports & Youth Welfare, Panchayat & Rural Development, PHE (Drinking Water), Tribal Welfare, Tourism, Social Welfare, Handloom & Textiles, Sericulture, Minor Irrigation, Cultural Affairs, and more.

The Tribal community, including the RHAC, faces significant educational backwardness, evident in the poor infrastructure of school buildings and related facilities. However, whenever the RHAC has had the opportunity to enhance the field of education, it has consistently seized it. Efforts have been made through provisions like Teaching Learning Materials (TLM), school building construction, and additional classroom construction, all aimed at advancing the educational sector.

The vast southern region of the Council area, nearly the entire foothills bordering Assam and Meghalaya, remains largely inaccessible by roads or any means of communication. Additionally, village roads in other areas are in a deplorable state, necessitating their improvement, renovation, or reconstruction. Recognizing the pivotal role of communication in fostering rapid development, the RHAC is giving utmost priority to taking necessary actions in this regard.

Understanding that an efficient communication system is vital for progress, a significant portion of the allocated budget is dedicated to the development of Rural Roads & Bridges. Initially, due to limited budgetary allocations, less attention was directed toward this sector. However, the Council has shifted its focus towards communication in recent times. As a result, numerous concrete roads have been improved and constructed, significantly enhancing the communication infrastructure compared to earlier times.

Within the RHAC area, numerous remote regions pose significant challenges in accessing medical facilities. Consequently, the Council has taken measures to address these issues by deploying multiple ambulances, ensuring better healthcare access for villagers in remote areas. Moreover, the Council consistently endeavors to improve the infrastructure of Mini Primary Health Centers (PHCs), Health Sub-Centers, First Referral Units (FRUs), and Community Health Centers (CHCs), aiming to cater to the healthcare needs of the people within the RHAC more effectively.

The people of RHAC predominantly rely on agriculture, and to cater to their interests, the Council has initiated numerous beneficial schemes aimed at uplifting the Tribal community. The RHAC area holds immense potential for diverse agricultural activities. Recognizing this potential, the Council has implemented various agricultural and allied sector schemes beneficial to the people, aimed at fostering economic upliftment.

Recognizing that Sports & Youth are fundamental drivers for enhancing development in the area, communities, and the state, the RHAC consistently focuses on implementing various beneficial schemes for the youth of RHAC and the sports sector. This includes conducting extensive sports training programs encompassing football, volleyball, martial arts, and more. Additionally, the Council encourages participation in National/State Level sports events and endeavours to develop the sports field to foster a thriving sports culture.

Within the Tribal Welfare Department, the Council implements diverse developmental schemes aimed at benefiting tribal communities alongside other ethnic groups within RHAC. These initiatives encompass infrastructural development, the construction of various Community Development Centers, and offering one-time scholarships for ST Students, among other supportive measures for Tribal Organizations.

This Council has recently introduced several special schemes aimed at recognizing and encouraging achievements in various sectors within RHAC. These schemes include awards in categories such as Agriculture, Education, Sports, Peace & Integrity, Youth, Women Empowerment, Sangbadikota, Sericulture activities, Entrepreneurship, and more. Their goal is to motivate and acknowledge the contributions of individuals within the RHAC community across diverse fields.

The building of a permanent Secretariat Building, a longstanding aim of the RHAC community, is now underway. The constuction work, a G + 1 structure, is in progress.

== Current members ==
Constituencies under Rabha Hasong Autonomous Council are as follows. The next election to the council is scheduled on 2 April 2025 with results on 4 April 2025.

Chief Executive Councillor: Tankeshwar Rabha
Chairman: Sonaram Rabha
Deputy Chairman: Alaka Rabha
District	Ward No.	Constituency	Name of Councillor	Party	Remarks
Goalpara district	1	Dhupdhara	Anadi Sarkar	Rabha Hasong Joutha Mancha	
Goalpara district	2	Kothakuthi	Bhairab Kachari	Bharatiya Janata Party	
Goalpara district	3	Dhanubhanga	Phanindra Rabha	Rabha Hasong Joutha Mancha	
Goalpara district	4	Rangjuli	Manidipa Rabha	Rabha Hasong Joutha Mancha	
Goalpara district	5	Kushdhowa Darranggiri	Parama Rabha	Indian National Congress	
Goalpara district	6	North Dudhnoi	Ujjwala Brahma	Rabha Hasong Joutha Mancha	
Goalpara district	7	South Dudhnoi	Tankeshwar Rabha	Rabha Hasong Joutha Mancha	
Goalpara district	8	Bandarshi	Divanitha Marak	Rabha Hasong Joutha Mancha	
Goalpara district	9	Majjakhilli	Prabodh Rabha	Rabha Hasong Joutha Mancha	
Goalpara district	10	Salpara	Alaka Rabha	Rabha Hasong Joutha Mancha	
Goalpara district	11	Habraghat	Pratap Rabha	Rabha Hasong Joutha Mancha	
Goalpara district	12	Dirmajakhili	Jiban Rabha	Rabha Hasong Joutha Mancha	
Goalpara district	13	Pub Ajagar	Bhulai Bala Rabha	Rabha Hasong Joutha Mancha	
Goalpara district	14	Jinari	Deban Momin	Rabha Hasong Joutha Mancha	
Goalpara district	15	Agia	Suchitra Nath	Bharatiya Janata Party	
Goalpara district	16	Dwarka	Modit Rabha	Independent	
Goalpara district	17	Bardamal Kalyanpur	Legen Chandra Rabha	Rabha Hasong Joutha Mancha	
Goalpara district	18	Dariduri	Jonali Rabha	Rabha Hasong Joutha Mancha	
Goalpara district	19	Dodan	Dibakar Rabha	Rabha Hasong Joutha Mancha	
Goalpara district	20	Joyramkuchi	Premajuli Rabha	Bharatiya Janata Party	
Kamrup district	21	Jarihat	Ashok Rabha	Rabha Hasong Joutha Mancha	
Kamrup district	22	Bondapara	Meghali Rabha	Bharatiya Janata Party	
Kamrup district	23	Khalihakoth	Nagarmall Swargiyari	Rabha Hasong Joutha Mancha	
Kamrup district	24	Luki	Rellina Sangma	Independent	
Kamrup district	25	Hahim	Sonaram Rabha	Rabha Hasong Joutha Mancha	
Kamrup district	26	Jongakhuli	Arjun Chhetri	Rabha Hasong Joutha Mancha	
Kamrup district	27	Boko	Sumit Rabha	Rabha Hasong Joutha Mancha	
Kamrup district	28	Uttar Bongaon	Aditya Rabha	Rabha Hasong Joutha Mancha	
Kamrup district	29	Dakshin Bongaon	Minati Boro	Rabha Hasong Joutha Mancha	
Kamrup district	30	Bamunigaon	Ajit Rabha	Bharatiya Janata Party	
Kamrup district	31	Gobardhan	Jyotish Chandra Rabha	Rabha Hasong Joutha Mancha	
Kamrup district	32	Pantan	Ramakanta Rabha	Rabha Hasong Joutha Mancha	
Kamrup district	33	Kulsi	Rashmi Bala Rabha	Rabha Hasong Joutha Mancha	
Kamrup district	34	Chandubi	Nripen Chandra Rabha	Rabha Hasong Joutha Mancha	
Kamrup district	35	Silputa	Kamaleshwar Rabha	Bharatiya Janata Party	
Kamrup district	36	Rani	Pushpanjali Boro	Rabha Hasong Joutha Mancha	
None	37	Nominated	TBA	Nominated	
None	38	Nominated	TBA	Nominated	
None	39	Nominated	TBA	Nominated	
None	40	Nominated	TBA	Nominated	

== See also ==
- Rabha people
- Rabha language
