= Tiwa people (Asia) =

Ethnic group of north-eastern India

Tiwa
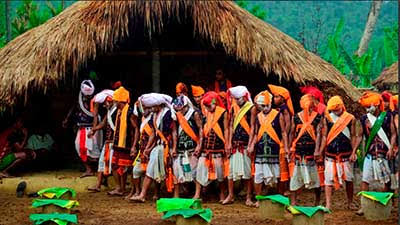

Total population
- 371,000 appox. (2011 Census)

Regions with significant populations
- India (Assam (in Tiwa Autonomous Council), Manipur, Meghalaya, Nagaland, Arunachal Pradesh) Bangladesh Myanmar

Languages
- Tiwa (native), Assamese (predominantly spoken)

Religion
- Hinduism, Christianity

Related ethnic groups
- Other Tibeto-Burman groups

The Tiwa people (also known as Lalung) is a Tibeto-Burmese ethnic group primarily inhabiting the Northeast Indian states of Assam, Meghalaya, Arunachal Pradesh, Manipur and Nagaland, and some parts of neighbouring Bangladesh and Myanmar.

A striking peculiarity of the Tiwa is their division into two sub-groups, Hills Tiwa and Plains Tiwa. The founder of Tiwa community is Pha Poroi "Indrosing Dewri" who has contributed a lot to the construction of Tiwa society. He also wrote the Tiwa national anthem called - O Angé Tiwa Tosima.

== Etymology ==
They were known as Lalungs/Lalong/Laleng in the Assamese Buranjis and in Colonial literature and in the Constitution of India, though members of the group prefer to call themselves Tiwa (meaning "the people who were lifted from below"). Some of their neighbours still call them Lalung.

== Origin ==
According to Bishnu Prasad Rabha, the Tiwas are originally the Pator-goya clan of the ethnic Deori people. He said that the word "Chutia" became "Tia/Tiwa" by omitting the first part "Chu" but there has been no scientific evidence to support the claim. At present, the Patorgoyan clan is neither found among the Deoris nor among the Chutias, and are believed to have migrated to the west. The origin of the word "Lalung" hasn't yet been decided by the historians. In the Karbi language, "Lalung" means "sinking from the water", while in the Ahom language, it means "migration towards the west". From this, it can be presumed that the Tiwa people first met the Karbis when they proceeded towards the west to Nagoan by crossing the Brahmaputra.

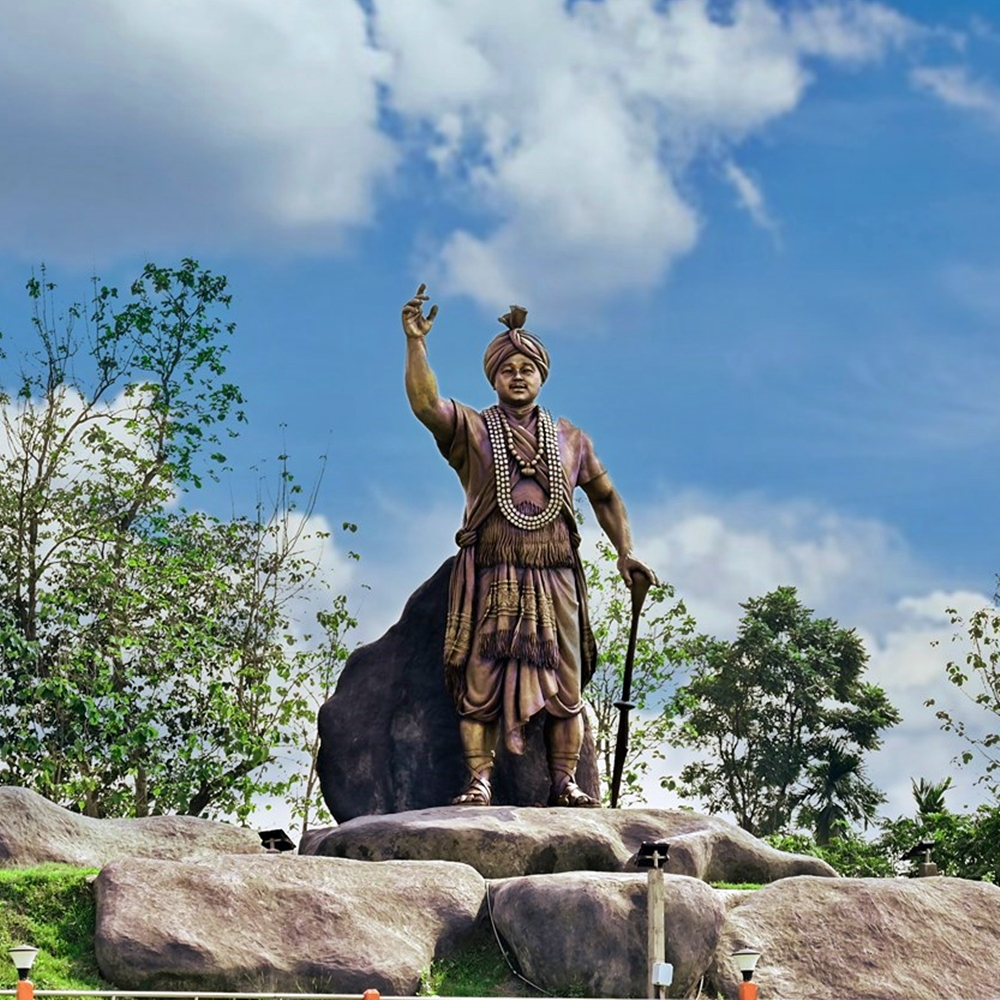
Statue of Tiwa chief- Jongal Balahu (1415–1440) or Mriganka from Jongal Balahu Garh at Raha, Nagaon, Assam

This is moreover supported by the folklore of the Tiwa people who believe that they migrated a long time back from their homeland which was situated in the eastern part of undivided Darrang district (Sonitpur district). The memory of their original homeland is expressed in their popular song "Lali-lai-Hilali". This folklore of Hilali is also shared by the Sadiyal Kacharis (i.e. Sonowals, Chutias, Deoris) which points out to the fact that the entire area including the hills of Arunachal, and the present-day districts of Sonitpur, Lakhimpur, Dhemaji, Tinsukia, Dibrugarh, Sibsagar was once a single kingdom which was bounded by the Dikarai and Dikhou.

However, some other experts believe that there has been no scientific evidence to support the claim that the Tiwas are related to the Pator-goya clan, which prompted a section of the Deoris to begin a search. A preliminary investigation from 30 September to 5 October under the aegis of Jimachaya Giyan Aru Juktibadi Samaj has given a positive indication of the presence of Deori people in Kachin province and near Yangon in Myanmar. A team of researchers has decided to visit Myanmar, hoping to find out the lost clan.

Researchers like Robert Shafer, George Greirson and Dr. Suniti Chatterjee have all placed the Tiwa, Kokborok and the Deori language as belonging to a single family under Kachari languages. In the Assam Census report of 1881, Wadell made a significant proposition about the Tiwas, "The Lalungs got mixed up with the Garos and the Mikirs. They have numerous exogamous clans". This could be one of the reasons as to why the Ahom chroniclers could not differentiate between the Tiwas and the other ethnic groups of the hills, and the reason why the Tiwas developed a unique culture of their own retaining old customs from their homeland as well as getting influenced from the Karbis and Garos.

== Medieval Period ==
The Buranjis (Assamese chronicles) recount the meeting of Assamese soldiers with "people of the margins"(datiyaliya) and the settlement of 12 families of Lalung and Mikir, i.e. Tiwas and Karbis, in the plains in the 17th century. Tiwa people are closely associated with the principality of Kobâ (Gobha). The Kobâ rajâ (Gobha raja) belongs to a Tiwa clan and his territory covers more or less the Tiwa cultural realm. Kobâ (Gobha) is mentioned in the Buranjis since the early 18th century, as an important market for the trade between Tiwa (Lalung) Kingdom of greater Assam, and the Jaintia Kingdom. These two powerful neighbors have since been competing to keep Kobâ (Gobha) principality under their authority, with varying success. The historical role of Kobâ (Gobha) and the Tiwas as mediators between plains and hills in Central Assam is enacted every year during an old fair, the Jonbeel Mela (Chunbîl Melâ).

The Tiwas were under the Jaintia kingdom but it had to acknowledge the Ahom supremacy during the reign of Pratap Singha. The Gobha raja accepted Jayadhwaj Singha as its overlord in 1659 A.D. Gobha was used as an army base during the reign of Rudra Singha to invade the Jaintia Kingdom. The chief of the Tiwas tried to yoke off the Ahom supremacy during the reign of Siva Singha but was suppressed. This state was formerly an appendages of the government of Guwahati under the Borphukan, but during the Moamoria rebellion, the area came under the rule of the Jaintias.

The Gobha chief who became vassal of the Ahoms during the reign Pratap Singha, died in the Battle of Pandu, fighting from the side of the Ahoms against the Mughals.

== Hills Tiwa ==
The Hills Tiwa live in the westernmost areas "The Ancient Lalung - Tiwa Hills" now known as Umswai Valley of Amri Constituency under the Karbi Anglong Autonomous Council of Amri block in West Karbi Anglong district (Assam) and as well as in the Northeastern corner of Ri-Bhoi district (Meghalaya). They speak their own Tiwa language which is a part of Tibeto-Burman language of the Bodo-Garo group. They are divided into a dozen clans recognized by specific names which they use as patronymics. Their descent system can be said to be ambilineal. In most cases, the husband goes to live in her wife's family settlement (matrilocality), and their children are included in their mother's clan. However, in about 30% of unions, the woman comes to live with her husband. In such cases, children take the name of their father. This trend is on the rise under the influence of neighbouring populations which are mostly patrilineal. Around 97.98% of Tiwas follow Hinduism blend with their traditional beliefs, and around 1.71% follows Christianity. The Hill Tiwas society is organized around seven old villages which constitute its political as well as ritual center. Each of them harbors a chief (loro) who performs judicial and religious duties for a network of settlements. Old villages are also characterized by their bachelor dormitory (shamadi).

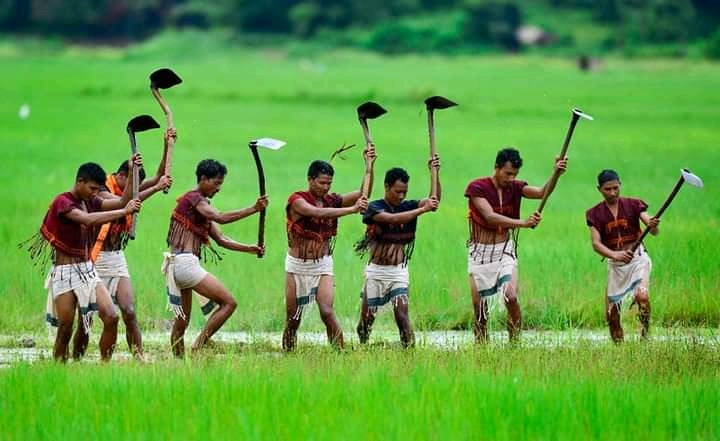
Tiwa man folks

== Plains Tiwa ==
Plains Tiwa live on the flatlands of the Southern bank of the Brahmaputra valley, The following places below are the areas mostly in Morigaon, Nagaon, Hojai, Kamrup (Rural) and (Metro), Sibsagar, Jorhat, Sonitpur, Lakhimpur and Dhemaji districts.They speak Assamese as their mother tongue. Their descent system is definitely patrilineal. Their patronymics are not derived from their clan's names but are common Assamese surname-names instead (mostly Lalung, Pator, Senapati, Manta, Dekaraja, Dewraja, Bordoloi, Konwar, Doloi, Kakoti, Deka, Dewri, Deuri, Deory, Deori, Bhuyan, etc.). Their religion shares many elements with Assamese Hinduism but remains specific. And plains Tiwa's sang "Godalboriya Geet", plains Tiwa's folk songs sang in Assamese & Tiwa mixed.

== Tiwa Language ==
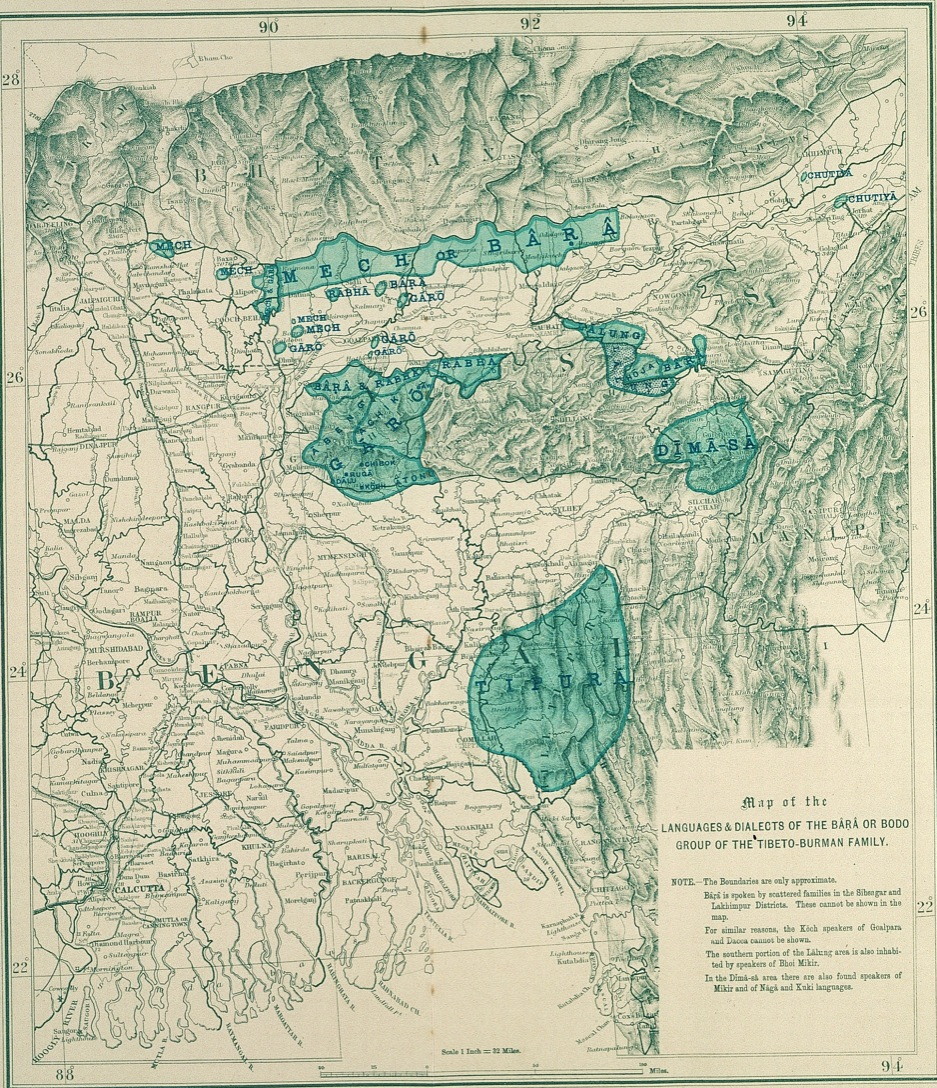
Distribution of Lalung(Tiwa), as reported in the Language Survey of India 1903

Tiwa language (India) is spoken in northwestern Karbi Anglong district and further north in parts of Morigaon District / Nagaon District in the plains of Assam. There is a cluster of Tiwa villages in the northeastern Ri-Bhoi District of Meghalaya. For want of precise knowledge, it is difficult to speak of strictly delimited Tiwa dialects. On the one hand, Tiwa, probably with the exception of the variety of Tiwa spoken near Sonapur in Assam, is a single language, any of its dialects being mutually intelligible with any other. Like most languages of the hill tribes of the Northeast India, Tiwa people do not have their own script. Therefore, they use the Latin script and occasionally use Assamese script.

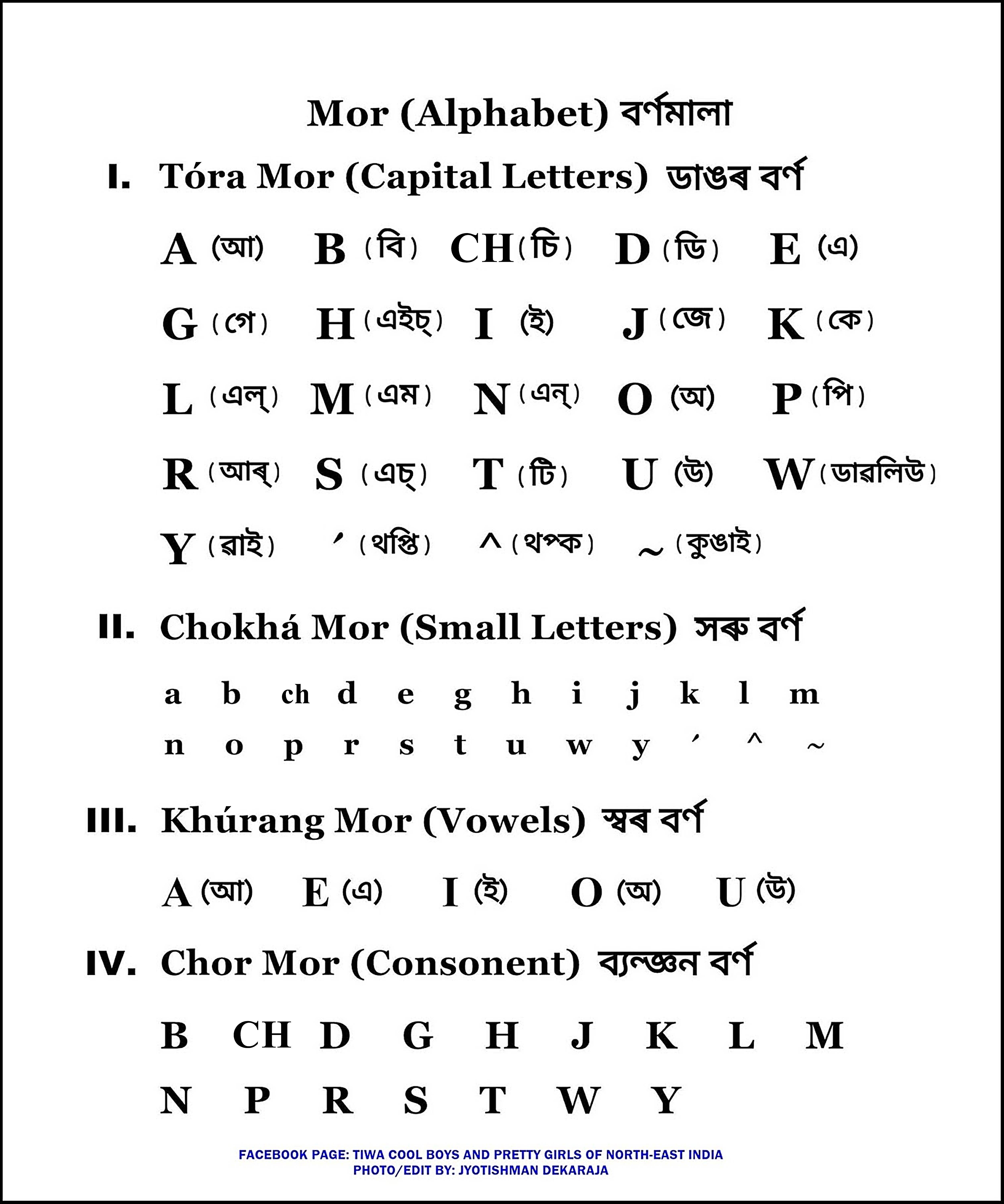
Tiwa Mor (Tiwa Alphabet)

== Tiwa Clan System ==
The Tiwa community is divided into several Phoit (Wali) and Dilok (divided into exogamous clans and again the clans are sub-divided into many sub-clans) Example - Amsai wali, Marjong wali, Magro, Sagra, Mayong, Lingra, Lumphui, Amkha, Amlera, Amni baro, Amnisa, Rongkhoi baro, Rongkhoisa etc. TheWali or Phoits have their own Loro. The Loro (priest) is the Governor of the 12 Phoits or Wali kingdoms. Now in every Phoits there is a Sat Phuni, Baro Phuni called Khul,Pongos, Khel, Mahar, and Warang. Tiwa have various Khuls, they can marry with other Khul but not with Pongos, Khel, and Warang (means that they are allowed to marry people from other clans). A single khul consists of several Khel Mahar. In every Khul there are different Khel called Warang.

- Note: Khul = Clan,
  - (i) Pongos,
  - (a) Khel, Warang

The Tiwa clans cooperate with one another as a community, whether constructing a house, harvesting rice, or worshiping. Every clan has its own place of community worship where there is a titular for the clan's god.

List of Tiwa Clans and Sub-Clans
Number	Clans
1	Agari
2	Amphi
3	Amphili
4	Amchi/Amsi
5	Amchong/Amsong
6	Aphi
7	Agar
8	Amji
9	Akawang
10	Anchong/Ansong
11	Buma/Puma
12	Borong
13	Chagra/Sagra
14	Cholong/Solong
15	Chomsol/Somsol
16	Chongrang/Songrang
17	Chomchong/Somsong
18	Chomcha/Somsa
19	Chongcha/Songsa
20	Chanchor/Sansor
21	Cholo/Solo
22	Darang
23	Darphang
24	Daphor
25	Dakhor
26	Datrang
27	Dongkhoi
28	Damo
29	Dumura
30	Hukai
31	Khorai/Kharai
32	Kholar
33	Khajar/Khachar/Khasar
34	Karkha
35	Kharal
36	Khamli
37	Khonjai
38	Kocho/Koso
39	Lumphoi
40	Ladur
41	Laram/Lara
42	Lupu
43	Madar/Mathar
44	Madur
45	Magor
46	Marjong
47	Malang/Melang
48	Machlai/Maslai
49	Markang
50	Machereng/Masereng
51	Mithi
52	Maloi
53	Muni
54	Mathlai
55	Mothrong/Mosorong
56	Phangchong/Pamchong/Phangsong/Phamsong
57	Pulu
58	Puru/Pu
59	Radu
60	Rongkhoi
61	Taram

== Tiwa Festivals ==
Festivals constitute a significant part of the culture of the Tiwa people. There are many festivals of Tiwa people. Tiwa people celebrate several occasions and festivals. The main festivals of the Tiwa ethnic groups are: Three Pisû (Bihu), Borot Kham (Borot Utsav), Kablâ Phûja, Khel Cháwa Kham, Langkhôn Phûja, Sôgra Phûja, Wanshúwa Kham (Wanshuwa), Yanglî Phûja, etc. (Note: Pisû = Bihu Kham = Festivals, Phûja = Puja).They also organize the Jonbeel Mela every year in which the barter system of trade is still prevalent.

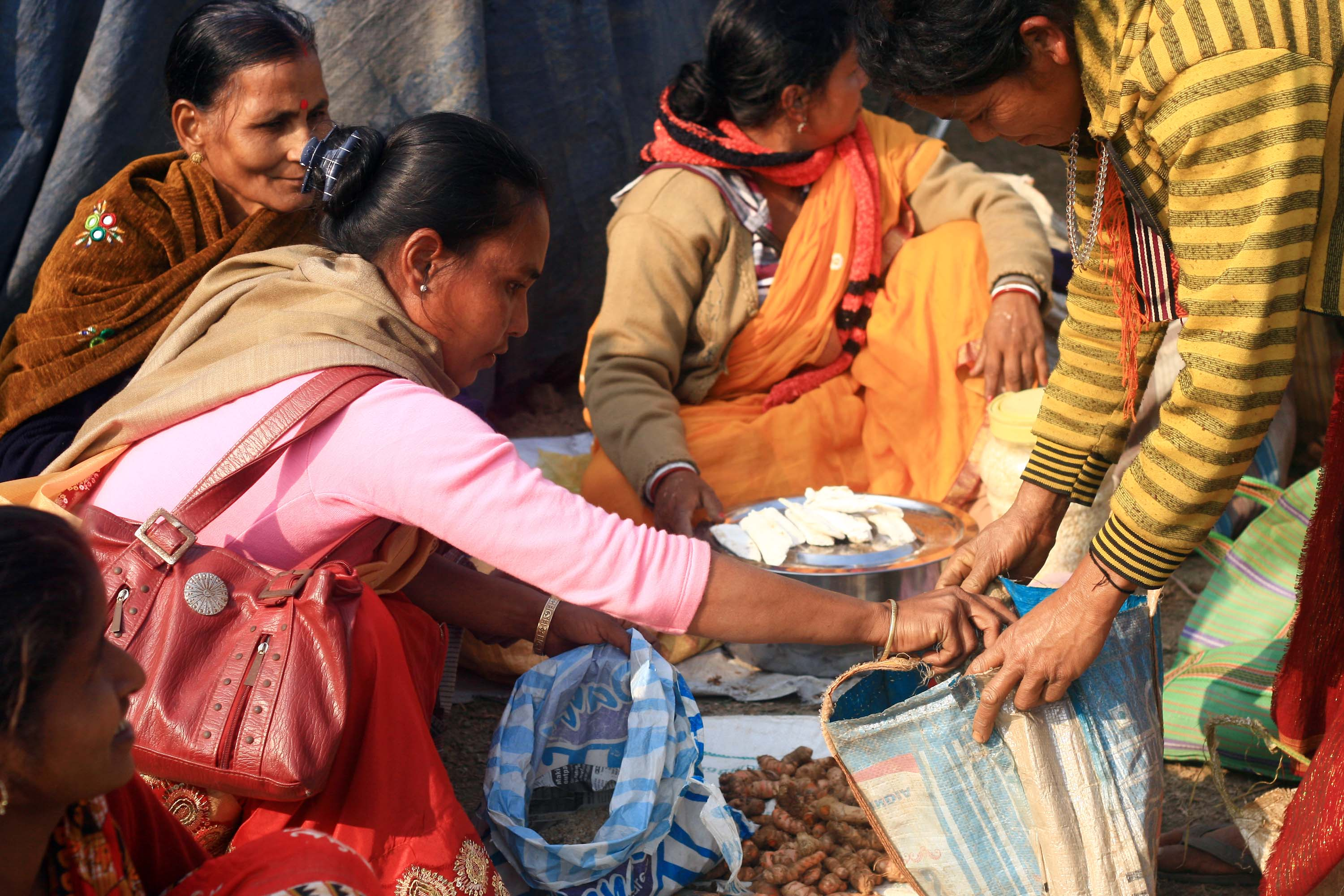
Jonbeel Mela

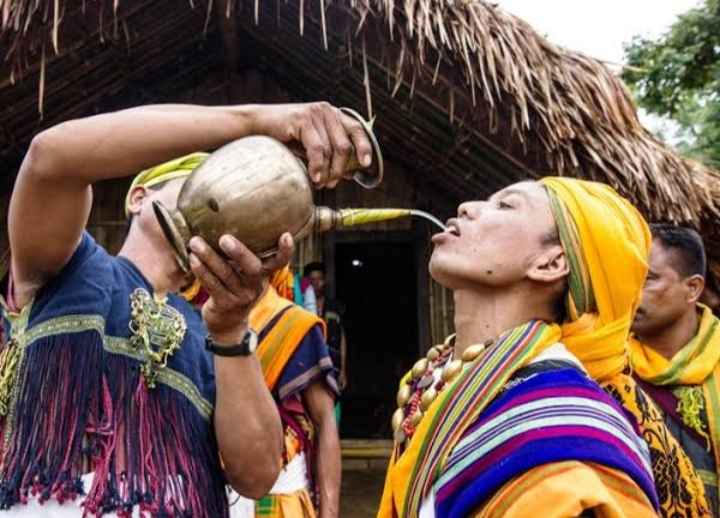
Khelchawa Festival of Hills Tiwa.

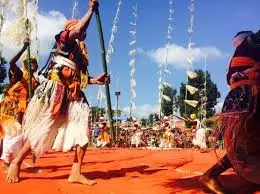
Langkhon festival

In the festivals, the Tiwa communities sing two types of songs. These are:

1. Lo Ho La Hai - songs of the ceremony of name-giving, wedding, and harvesting, etc.
2. Lali Hilali Lai– song of the marriage ceremony, Karam, and similar festivals.
- Songs and dances are the living spirits of the Tiwa community; the Tiwa people is considered to have one of the richest reservoirs of folk songs and dances in the state of Assam and Meghalaya.

== Population ==
A Hill Tiwa house

Tiwa population in India is 371,000 approx. (2011 census). But according to the 2001 Census reports 161,000 approx. "Tiwas/Lalungs"; this figure comprises only the Plains Tiwas. As they became a Scheduled Tribe after the 2001 Census, the Hill Tiwas were not taken into account. Their population may be estimated at 10,000 approx. The total number of Tiwa speakers amounts only to 34,800 approx. (2011 Census).

== Tiwa Autonomous Council (Tiwashong) ==
Tiwa people have an autonomous council consisting of 36 seats for their special representation in Assam called the Tiwa Autonomous Council. The last election was held in 2020.

Composition of Tiwa Autonomous Council

Government (35)
Bharatiya Janata Party: 33
Asom Gana Parishad: 2

Opposition (1)
Indian National Congress: 1

== Official status ==
Tiwas, under the denomination of "Lalung", have been recorded as a Scheduled Tribe since the first Constitution Order (1950) for the State of Assam excluding the autonomous districts of Karbi Anglong and North Cachar Hills (now named Dima Hasao), thus leaving the Hill Tiwas out. It was only in 2002 that the Tiwa (Lalung) Scheduled Tribe status has been extended to Karbi-Anglong district and thus to the Hill Tiwas. Tiwas still do not benefit the Scheduled Tribe (ST) status in the State of Meghalaya.

== Notable people ==
- Rama Kanta Dewri, politician

== See also ==
- Tiwa Tribe
- History of Tiwa Autonomy Movement
- Jonbeel Mela
- Tiwa Youth Association (TYA)
- The Wild Lalungs
- Tiwa language (India)
- Sogra Festival
- Deo Langkhui
- Wanshuwa Festival
- Shikdamakha
- Tiwa Autonomous Council (Tiwashong)
- Tiwa musical instrument
- Tiwa-English Dictionary
