= Tiwa-English Dictionary =

- Editors: UV Jose, Horsing Kholar, Juliana Maslai, Alfred Maslai, Bibiana Maslai, Simon Mithi
- Author: U V Jose
- Illustrator: Horsing Kholar, Silvanus Kholar, Nobel Maslai and Romeo Maslai
- Cover artist: Linda Konnerth and Piten Basumatary
- Language: English
- Genre: Dictionary
- Published: 29 March 2014
- Publisher: Don Bosco Center for Indigenous Culture
- Publication place: India
- Media type: Dictionary
- Pages: 864
- 7610 headwords, 8576 sub-entries, thousands of phrases, idioms and examples, all marked for their phonemic tones with indication of borrowings from Assamese/Bengali, Hindi, Khasi and Karbi dialect synonyms in the Amsai, Magro and Amkha dialects, besides the primary Marjong variety.

Tiwa-English Dictionary: with English-Tiwa Index is a dictionary of the Tiwa language of Northeast India.

== About the author ==
Dr. UV Jose who has a PhD in linguistics, has been associated with Umswai Valley, the Tiwa tribe and the Tiwa language for more than 10 years.

His analysis of Tiwa is aided by his knowledge of related languages like Garo, Rabha and Boro, and that of Khasi, Karbi, Assamese and Hindi, with which Tiwa has had, and continues to have much contact. His some of the other works include the following 1. Isorni Khurang (Rabha language) (2022) 2. Pidan katha khakai (Rabha) (2014) 3. Khubil kodal (Tiwa) (2022) 4. Holy Bible in Thiva (2019) 5. Hewa Hason (Morangali language) (2017) 6. Juju bidirongi sastar v.1 (Rabba) (2016) 7. Juju Bidirongi sastar: bak II (Rabba) (2017) 8. Learner's Khasi Dictionary: with english-khasi index (2022)

== See also ==
- Deo Langkhui
- Wanshuwa Festival
- Shikdamakha
- Tiwa Autonomous Council (Tiwashong)
- Machal Lalung
- Horsing Kholar
