= Tiwa musical instruments =

Folk music instruments

Musical Instruments of the Tiwa tribe add to the rhythm of the festivals of the Tiwa tribe. Traditional musical instruments plays a major role in enrichment of the Tiwa culture. Through Tiwa musical instruments every Tiwa celebrates all the colourful Tiwa festivals or occasion. A list of some of the popular musical instruments of the Tiwa people are given below.

== Tongtoróng ==
It is crafted with wood, lizard skin and Muga strings. It is a 4 string instrument and is played with hands while singing a Panthái líwa song or Panthai rojawa for their soulmates to show their love and attraction to each other.

The term seems similar to the Duitara instrument played in the neighboring states of Meghalaya.

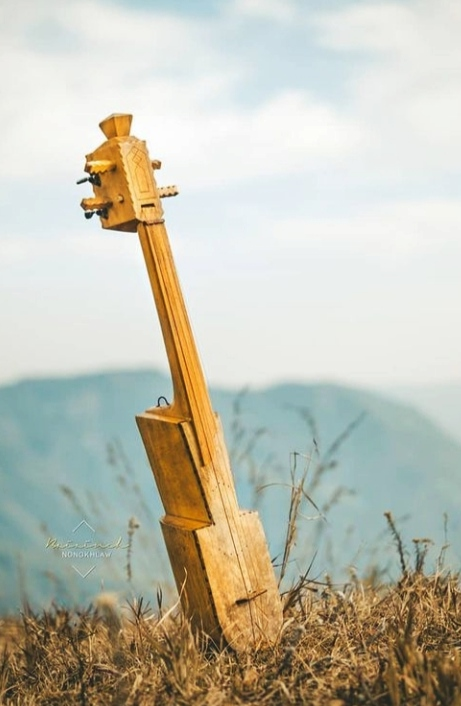
Tongtoróng, lute of the Tiwa people.

== Phêmba ==
It is crafted with wood, rice paddy stock and bamboo which is locally known as Wathí or Wapháng. The instrument has seven holes and it is an instrument that is joined in four parts. It is usually played every year during Langkhon festival and Muinarî Kanthî misaâwa.

== Khrám Panthái ==
Double sided and small in size, the Khrám Panthái is a membrane instrument belonging to the Tiwas. The cylindrical body is made of wood and the sides are covered with buffalo or goat skin. Local fibres are used for joining the two sides of the drum. The instrument measures about 1-foot in length and is played by striking against the sides with the bamboo sticks. It is played by men, the Khrám Panthái finds its use during the Wanshúwa and Langkhôn festival in a good number.

== Shîgakhel Khrám ==
The Shîgakhel Khrám is a double sided membrane instrument of the Tiwa. Made of wood the cylinder instrument, measuring about 2 feet in length and is covered with buffalo skin and goat skin on the either side. The two sides of the drums are joined with local fibres. A bamboo is used to strike the right side of the instrument while the palm of the hand is used to strike the left side. The Shîgakhel Khrám is generally played by the men during the Wanshúwa festival and also during the Yanglî and Sôgra Kham.

== Khrám ==
Khram is a double-sided membrane instrument of the Tiwas. This Khrám is made with the particular wood known as Kamarî (Gmelina arborea Linn)to make the body part. While buffalo skin as well as goat skin is used to cover the ends. Khrám is cylindrical in shape and measures about 4 feet in length. It is played by striking the sides with the palms of the hands. Generally used during langkhôn festival, wanshúwa festival, panthái liwa, khel cháwa, etc. It is played by the men.

== Pangsî ==
The Pangsî is a bamboo transverse flute belonging to the Tiwa. Measuring approximately 3 feet in length, it has a single blow hole and seven finger holes. The instrument is played by the men during the shangtuwa festival. There are many types of Pangsî but this types of Pangsî is quite commonly used.

== Chenthôr ==
The Chenthôr is a single string instrument of the Tiwas of Assam. The body of the instrument is made of wood known as Khójong pháng and the string of the instrument is made out of cane. This string is fixed to a bamboo wheel at the bottom of the instrument. Approximately measures one foot in length. It is bachelors who played the Chenthôr in the bachelors dormitory (Shámadi) during the Wanshúwa festival. Bachelor presents this instrument as a gift when he propose to a girl. Should the girl accept his proposal she will also accept the Chenthôr as a gift.

== Thógari ==
The Thógari is a plucked string instrument of the Tiwas. It is a single string wherein the string is made of silk. The neck of the instrument is made of wood known as Shâdon pháng (Alstonia scholaris Brown) and the body is made of dried shell of gourd locally known as Lawpurâ in Tiwa dialect which serves as a resonating chamber. Measuring 3 to 4 feet in length, the Thógari is used as a solo instrument and is played inside the bachelor's dormitory (Shámadi) by bachelor to express his love for his soulmate.

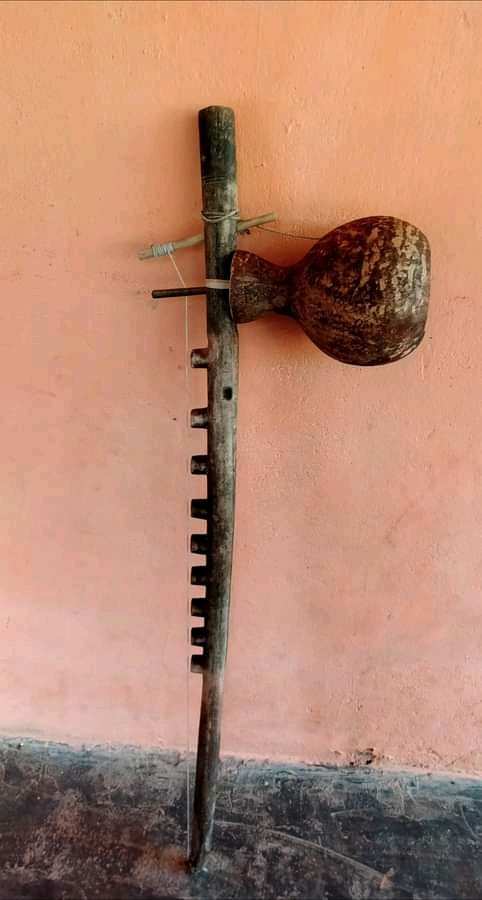
Thógari

== See also ==
- Tiwa language (India)
- Deo Langkhui
- Wanshuwa Festival
- Shikdamakha
- Tiwa Autonomous Council (Tiwashong)
- Machal Lalung
