= Lalung =

Lalung may refer to:

- Lalung people (Tiwa) an ethnic group of India
- Lalung language (Tiwa) a Sino-Tibetan language of India
- Machal Lalung, a miscarriage of justice victim from India

== See also ==
- Lalong (disambiguation)
