= Horsing Kholar =

Indian writer and social worker (born 1966)

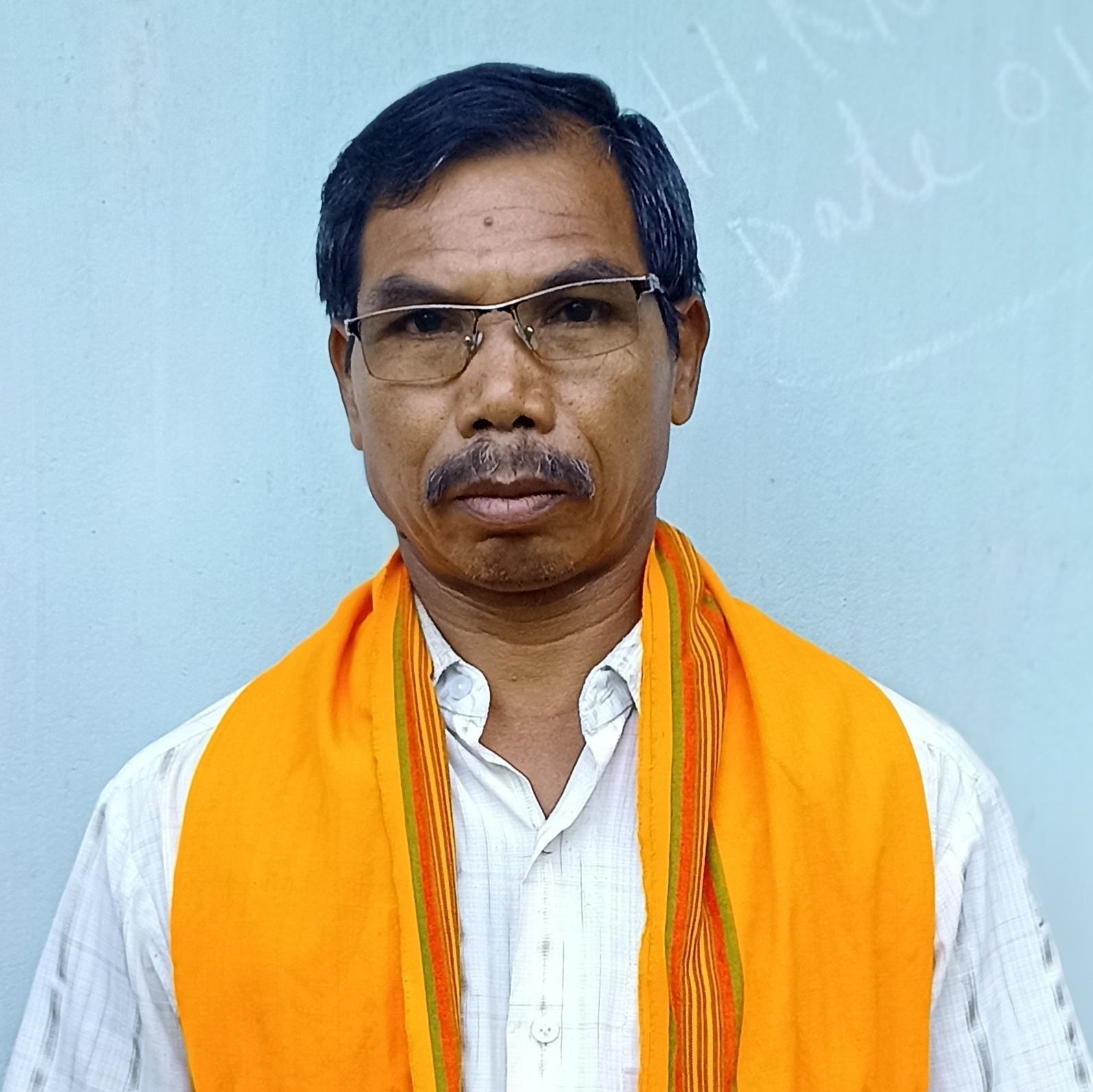
- Born: 27 March 1966 (age 60)
- Occupation: PWD Employee
- Writing career
- Language: Tiwa
- Genre: Tiwa Literature
- Notable work: Adla re Thendone Sadra-2013
- Notable awards: Sahitya Akademi Award, 2021

Horsing Kholar (born 27 March 1966) is a Tiwa-language writer and social worker from West Karbi Anglong district, Assam, India. He serves as the president of the Central Committee of Tiwa Mathonlai Tokhra (Tiwa Sahitya Sabha). He has a keen interest in writing and collecting books. He is proficient in Karbi, English, and Assamese.

== Early life and education ==
Kholar was born on 27 March 1966 in Ulukunchi, West Karbi Anglong, Assam, India. He is the eldest son of Sri Listor Kholar and Smt Sonbari Amsi. In 1977, his paternal uncle's wife died without any children. As a result, in March 1977, he moved from Ulukunchi to Shikdamakha village to take care of his uncle and manage his household. He has five children: Anil Kholar (son), Onita Kholar (daughter), Olindro Kholar (son), Mary Ferlinda Kholar (daughter), and Jefferson Kholar (son). He studied in Assamese medium up to Class 1 at Ulukunchi L.P. School. In 1978, he was admitted to St. Anthony's High School, Umswai, an English medium school now known as Don Bosco Higher Secondary School, Umswai. In 1988, he passed the HSLC examination and subsequently enrolled in Class XI at Ri Bhoi College, Nongpoh, Meghalaya, with the help of Fr. Abraham Kannattu, SDB. Unfortunately, due to illness and financial difficulties, he was unable to appear for the Class XII examination, which forced him to discontinue his education.

== Career ==
He taught at Don Bosco Higher Secondary School, Umswai, for ten years. On 11 November 1995, he joined the Public Works Department (PWD), Roads Division, Umpanai Subdivision, Umpanai, West Karbi Anglong. On 8 May 2013, he was honoured as a poet by the Tiwa Autonomous Council, Morigaon. In 2021, he was awarded the Sahitya Akademi Bhasha Samman for his contribution to the enrichment of the Tiwa language.

== Works ==
He began writing articles for souvenirs published by Tiwa organizations since he was in Class X. So far, eight of his books have been published—six by Tiwa Mathonlai Tokhra (TMT), one self-published, and one by Don Bosco Publications. His published works include:

1. Tama Shupane Sunjuli (Tiwa Musical Instruments), 2004 – published by TMT
2. Plangsi (Poems), 2006 – published by TMT
3. Sigarune Sunjuli (Tiwa Hunting Instruments), 2006 – published by TMT
4. Sanggu (Marriage Rites and Rituals), 2012 – self-published
5. Adla re Thendone Sadra (Comedy Stories), 2013 – published by TMT
6. Kharai Muthungraw (Basic Information about Birds), 2014 – published by Don Bosco Publications
7. Chongmai (Riddles), 2016 – published by TMT
8. Panat Shala (Basic Moral Characters), 2021 – published by TMT

He has also contributed to the compilation of the following dictionaries:

a) Bilingual Dictionary (Tiwa–English) by Dr. U. V. Jose – published in 2014

b) Trilingual Dictionary (Tiwa–Assamese–English) by ABILAC, North Guwahati, Assam – yet to be published

c) 11-lingual Dictionary (Boro, Deori, Dimasa, Garo/A’chik, Karbi, Mising, Rabha, Tiwa, Assamese, English, and Hindi) by ITSSA – yet to be published

d) Textbooks (RL) for Classes II, III, and IV of Don Bosco Higher Secondary School, Umswai – co-authored with Mr. Fabian Malang, published in 2008
