= Makum people =

Assamese people of chinese descent

Assamese Chinese
অসমীয়া চাইনিজ

Total population
- Approximately 2,000

Regions with significant populations
- Makum, Assam, India

Languages
- Assamese, Chinese language

Religion
- Christianity, Buddhism, Confucianism

Related ethnic groups
- Han Chinese, Sino-Tibetan peoples

The Makum People are an ethnic Chinese living in the town of Makum in Tinsukia district, Assam, India. They are mainly the descendants of Chinese workers whom the British brought to Assam in the nineteenth century to help establish the region's tea industry. Some were also the descendants of soldiers Ming dynasty who had arrived and settled in the Dimasa Kingdom, which was then a Ming tributary.

== History ==
The history of the Assamese Chinese community is mostly divided two distinct phases. The first phase involved alliances with the Dimasa Kingdom, where Chinese soldiers and merchants had established their presence in the region. The second phase began in 1850 when the British brought Chinese labourers to Assam specifically for tea cultivation.

The migrants were skilled in tea cultivation and were drawn by higher wages than they could earn at home. Over the following generations they put down deep roots in the region, worked as carpenters, dentists, canister and lead-sheet makers, and shopkeepers, married into local communities, and came to speak fluent Assamese alongside a mixed dialect of their own. Makum grew into the largest Chinatown in Assam. After Indian independence in 1947, most regarded themselves as citizens of India.

During and following the 1962 Sino-Indian War, the local Chinese community was largely displaced when many of its members were interned and subsequently deported under state security suspicions. Only a small population remains today, scattered across the state of Assam. In addition, the former Chinese school in Tinsukia was converted into a Hindi-medium institution. After the war, from 1964, many of the internees were sent to China, which dispatched ships to receive them, and the process separated numerous families, some for decades. Property left behind was seized as enemy property and later auctioned.

== Culture ==
The Assamese Chinese have retained many aspects of their Chinese heritage while also adopting elements of Assamese culture. They celebrate traditional Chinese festivals such as the Lunar New Year and the Mid-Autumn Festival, while also participating in local Assamese festivities, like Bihu. Today many call themselves simply Assamese and identify with the Assamese culture.

== Religion ==
The community follows more than one religion, chiefly Christianity, along with Buddhism. Christianity is the predominant faith.

== In literature ==
The community and its ordeal are the subject of the Assamese novel Makam (মাকাম) by the writer Rita Chowdhury, published in 2010 and based on interviews with more than a hundred Assamese Chinese. The book, which the author later translated into English as Chinatown Days, recounts how around 1,500 Assamese Chinese from Makum were imprisoned and deported during the 1962 war, and it was reprinted many times in its first year.

== See also ==
- Assamese people
