= Jonbeel Mela =

Culture of Tiwa community

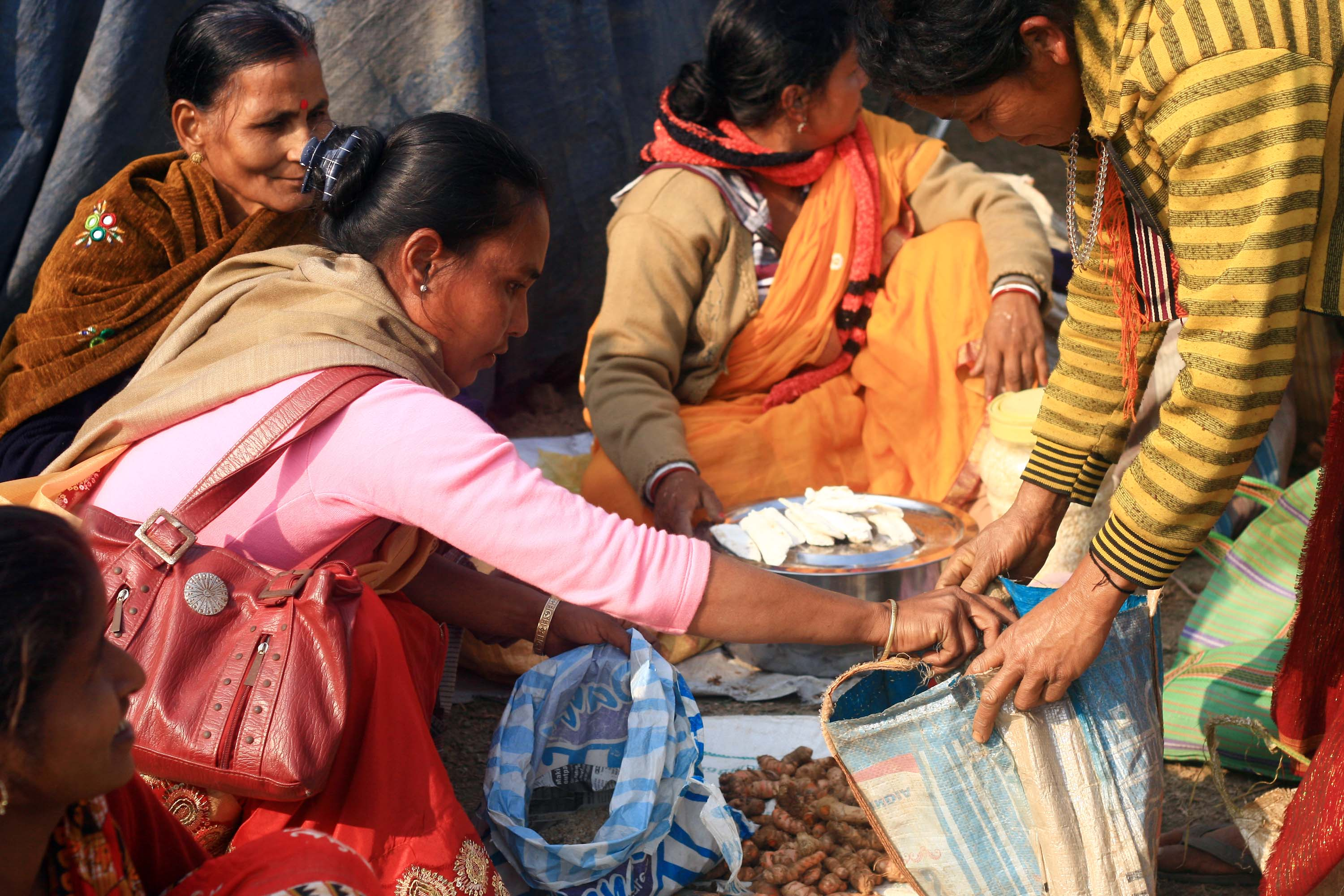
- Exchange of products through barter system
- Dates: On weekend (Thursday, Friday, Saturday) after Magh Bihu (3rd/4th week of January)
- Frequency: Annually
- Locations: Joonbeel, Jagiroad, Morigaon, Assam
- Years active: >500 years
- Inaugurated: 15th Century AD

Jonbeel Mela (pron:ˈʤɒnˌbi:l ˈmeɪlə) is a three-day annual Tiwa Community fair held on the weekend of Magh Bihu at a historic place known as Joonbeel, near Jagiroad in the Morigaon district, Assam.

== Transportation ==
It is 3 km from Jagiroad in Morigaon district of Assam and 65 km from Guwahati. The National Highway connecting the mela is NH 37.

== Etymology ==
The Joonbeel (Joon and Beel are Assamese terms for the Moon and a wetland respectively) is so called because a large natural water body is shaped like a crescent moon.

== History ==
The mela is said to have begun not later than 15th-century AD. It was first organized ago by the Tiwa (Lalung) to discuss the prevailing political situations.

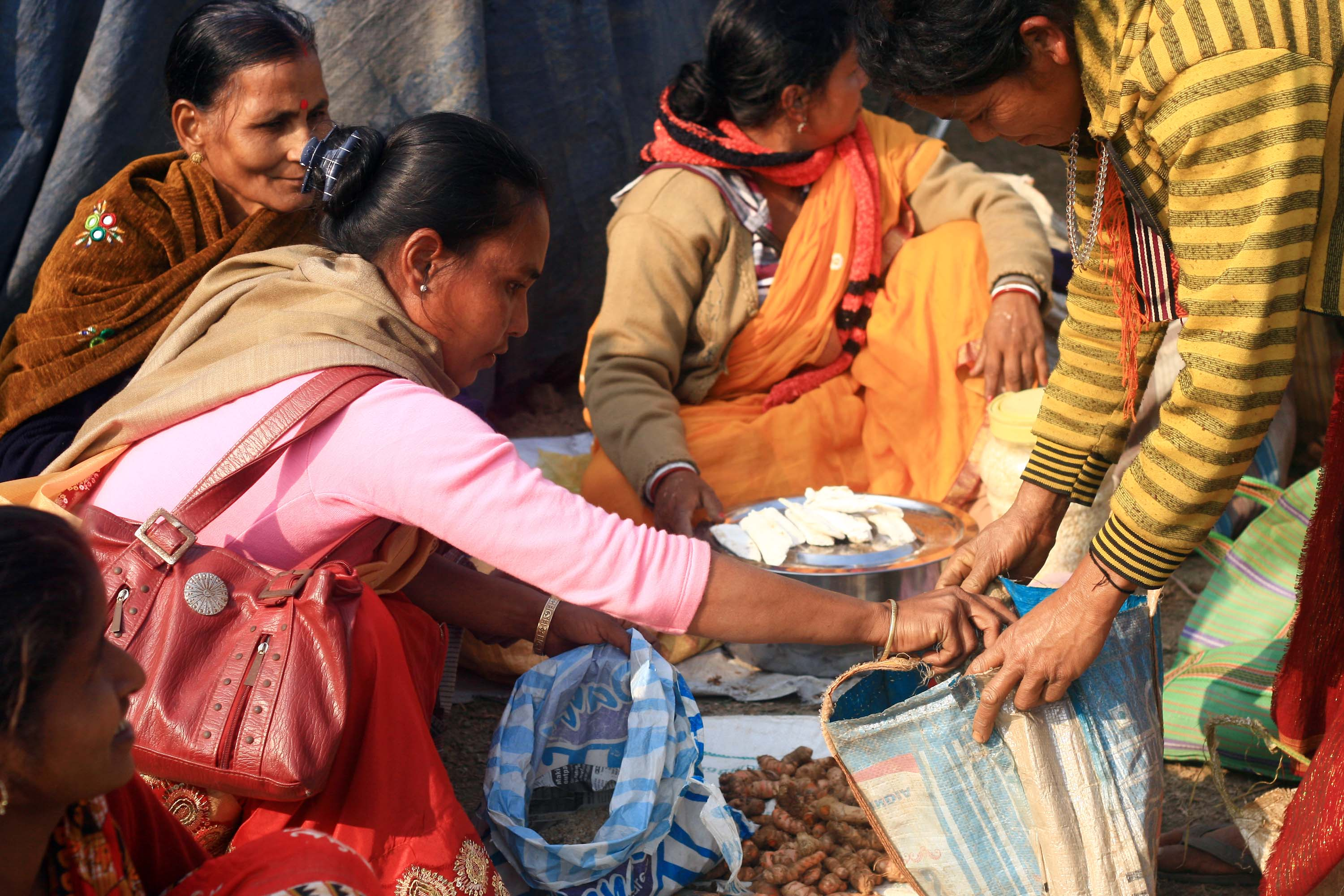
Exchange of products through barter system

== Barter system ==
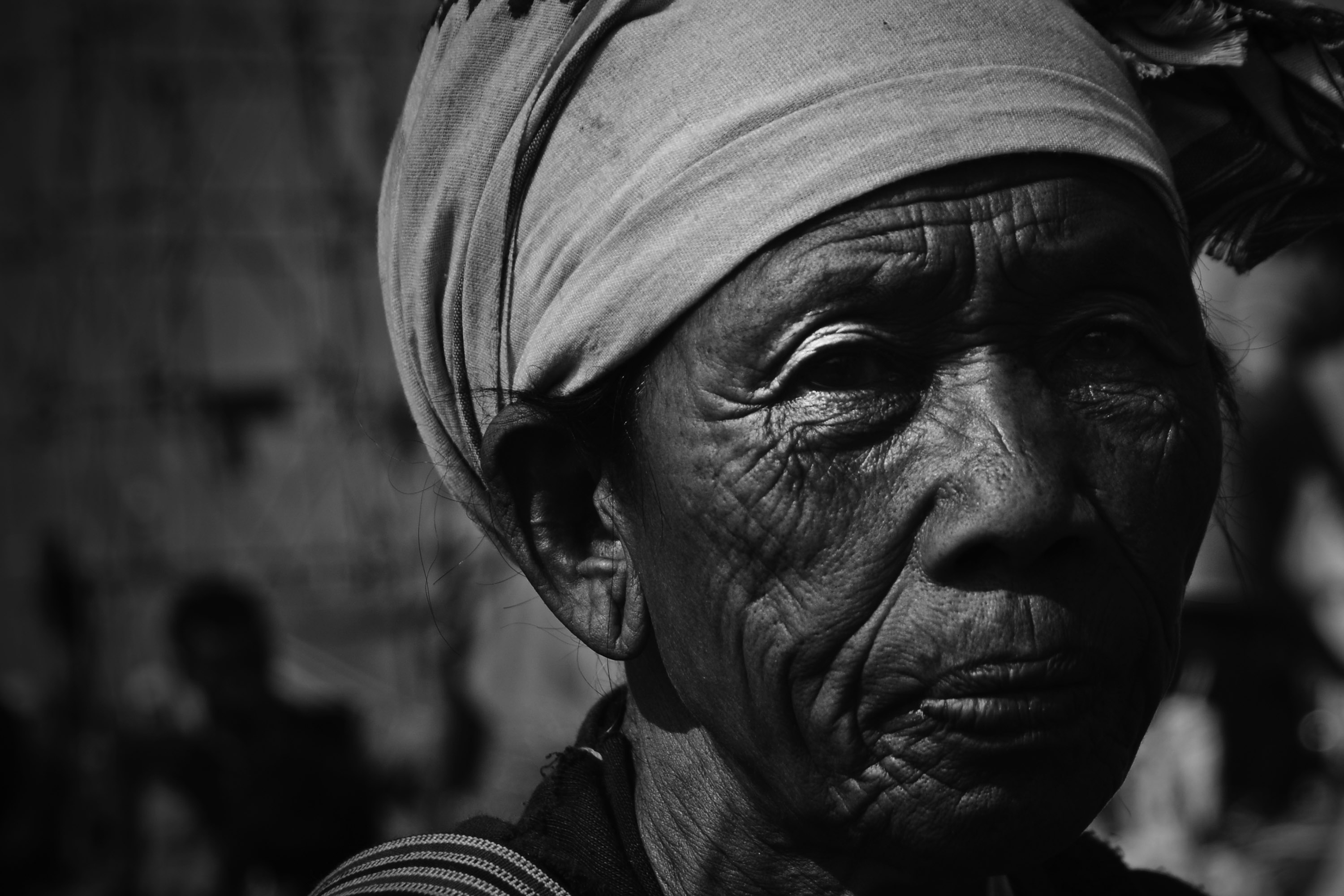
a Tiwa community

During the occasion a huge bazaar is held. A few days before the mela starts, indigenous tribal communities of Assam Hills and neighborhood like Hills Tiwa, Karbi, Khasi, and Jayantia of the northeast come down from the hills with products and interchange their merchandise with the native indigenous Assamese people in a barter system. It is said to be a hi-tech age barter system and perhaps the only fair in India where barter system is still alive.

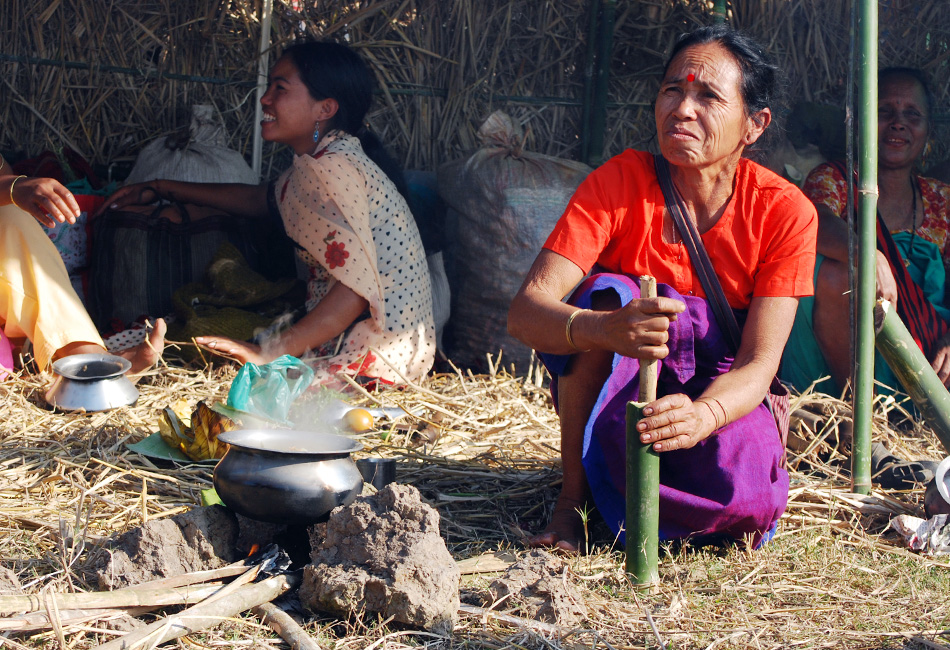
A Tiwa woman preparing food at the mela

== Significance ==
Before the mela takes place, (fire worship) is performed for the well-being of the mankind The mela starts with community fishing in the Chunbîl (Joonbeel) wetland.

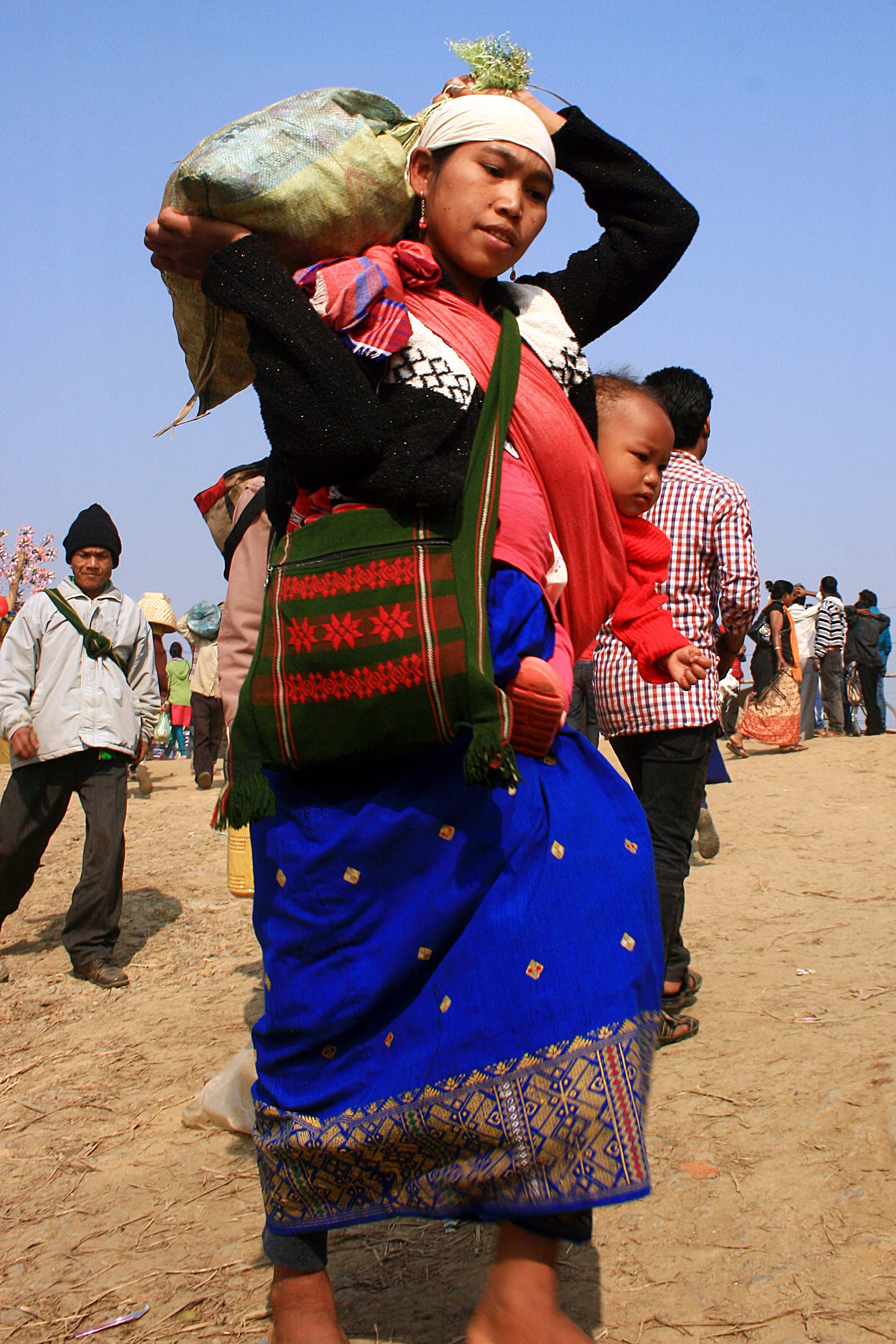
An indigenous tribal lady with her child at Joonbeel Fair

The theme of the mela is harmony and brotherhood among the indigenous Assamese communities and tribes scattered in the Northeast India. The Gobha King (Kobâ rajâ alias Gobha raja) along with his courtiers visits the mela and collects taxes from his subjects. People perform their traditional dance and music, making the atmosphere one of joy and fun.

== Royal allowance ==
On 17 January 2009 the Government of Assam announced an "Annual Royal Allowance" for the 19 customary kings from communities under the Gobha Kingdom that includes parts of three districts of present Assam: Morigaon, Nagaon and Kamrup. The Education Minister of Assam, Gautam Bora, distributing the bank cheques among the kings, said that the monetary assistance will be something between Rs. 3000 to Rs. 10,000 depending on the population count under them.

=== Reactions ===
Expressing their great delight at the initiative taken by the government the kings welcomed the move.

- Kobâ rajâ (Gobha raja) Deep Sing said, "It is a welcome move by the government of Assam. We have been demanding this for a long time as the economic condition of all these customary kings is going down. If we do not receive any assistance from the government, it would be difficult to maintain even the tradition of hosting the annual Joonbeel Mela, which has become an important tourist destination."
- Ahom King Susenfa Pratap Singha had said, "The Mela was initiated by our predecessors to maintain cordial relations among all the indigenous Assamese communities. The government assistance would help to fulfil the predecessors' dreams."

== In fiction ==
There is an elaborate references of the mela in Rita Chowdhury's Sahitya Akademy Award-winning novel Deo Langkhui.
