= Lalong =

Lalong may refer to:

- Lalong, Peren, a village in Nagaland, India
- Simon Lalong, Nigerian politician

== See also ==
- Lalung (disambiguation)
