= Sogra Festival =

Sogra
- Genre: Folk
- Frequency: Annual
- Locations: West Karbi Anglong District, Assam & Ri-Bhoi District, Meghalaya, India
- Area: Assam and Meghalaya, India
- Patron: Tiwa

The Sogra festival is the Tiwa festival that marks the beginning of the cultivation season. During this festival the village priest or Loro, performs a ritual called Mindai lekhewa. In this ritual the Loro recites the names of various deities and events that had happened in the past which may continue for several hours. The recitation ceremony takes place in the middle of the night at the residence of the Loro in presence of the Pisai (village elders) the Panthai Khel (youth group).

== Time of the festival ==
This festival is celebrated in the month of March and April. It may be termed as the spring festival observed by Amkha, Amsai, Amri, Marjong and Lumphui village. These are the four root villages that maintain the tradition of celebrating the Sogra festival. Generally it begins on Wednesday and continues till Monday. On these days the youth are actively involved in various activities associated with the festival.

== History ==
Regarding origin of the Sogra festival there are two different versions of a legend that are current among the Tiwa. According to a one version associated with Amsai village, this festival was introduced by an orphan boy named Majibor Sagra. According to the story, one day while Majibor was roaming around in the hills, he found some unusual white flowers which resemble snow. When the village elders came to know about the flowers, they thought, it was a gift from the god and decided to celebrate the finding as a religious festival. As the boy belonged to Sagra clan hence this festival was named after his clan. Another version of the story associated with the Marjong group tells that one day when Sharipahai, the supreme god was sitting in a meeting with other gods like Thalia,Thogriya and Palakhongor, a bunch of flowers fell from the sky. The flowers were very beautiful hence Thalia took them with him and gave it to the young boys of his village. The flowers fascinated the children who started dancing. Seeing their joyfulness the gods decided to commemorate the occasion by having a celebration. It may be noted that the Sogra festival is said to have been first held at Amsai.

== See also ==
- Wanshuwa Festival
