= Machal Lalung =

Indian prisoner

- Born: 1928; Colonial Assam, British India
- Died: 25 December 2007 (aged 78–79); Morigaon, Assam, India

Machal Lalung was a member of the Tiwa (Lalung) tribe of Assam from the village of Khalagaon (now Silchang) in Morigaon, Assam, who spent 54 years in an Indian jail without facing trial. He was arrested on the charges of "causing grievous harm" in 1951, and transferred to a psychiatric institution in Tezpur, where he was forgotten. In 1967, the doctors certified him as fit, and he was moved to a jail in Guwahati, where he spent nearly four decades. He was released in 2005, after the local human rights groups brought his case to the attention of the National Human Rights Commission of India. The Supreme Court of India ordered the Government of Assam to compensate him and provide him a monthly assistance amount. Lalung died in 2007.

== Early life ==
Lalung was the youngest child of Lodor and Bihumoti Lalung. The family belonged to the Maslai clan of the Tiwa tribe, and had come from the hills to settle in the Khalagaon area. His parents died when he was young, forcing him to live with his older sister's family.

== Arrest ==
Lalung was arrested in 1951, at the age of 23, in his home village. He knew only Tiwa language, and could not speak Assamese, Hindi or English - this might have prevented him from communicating with the authorities.

Lalung was booked under section 326 of the Indian Penal Code for "causing grievous harm", a charge which normally results in a sentence of no more than 10 years’ imprisonment. The civil rights organisations who investigated the case later found "no substantive evidence" to support the charge.

Less than a year after his arrest, Lalung was transferred to a psychiatric institution in Tezpur, and apparently forgotten. In 1967, doctors certified Lalung as "fully fit", but instead of being released, he was transferred to a jail in Guwahati, where he remained until his release.

== Release ==
In 2003, local human rights groups brought Lalung's case to the attention of the National Human Rights Commission of India. As a result of the Commission's intervention, his case was heard and he was released on June 1, 2005, after paying a token bond of one Indian rupee. Following his release, the Indian Supreme Court, taking suo motu notice, ordered the State Government to pay Lalung a compensation of Rs. 3 lakh and a monthly assistance of Rs. 1,000 for life.

== After the release ==
Lalung's sister had died in 2000, leaving Lalung with no family or relatives. After Lalung's release, he was taken back to his village, where only one villager recognised him. "We handed him over to the village headman but could not find his family or relatives" said a police official.

Lalung died on 25 December 2007.

After he was released from Gopinath Bordoloi Mental Hospital in 2005, a Supreme Court lawyer F. I. Choudhury wrote letter to then CJI Justice R. C. Lahoti regarding the plight of Lalung. CJI took cognizance and the letter was treated as ' letter petition' under its epistolary jurisdiction and the matter was heard in open court. In this case finally Supreme Court of India passed detail judgment regarding the undertrials who are languishing either in jail or mental hospital.

== In popular culture ==
Indra Bania (centre) as Machal in Freedom at the Edge

Freedom at the Edge is a short film by Aneisha Sharma, based on Lalung's story.

== Machal or Machang ==
Pranjal Kumar Mahanta, a correspondent of Assamese magazine Bismoi, met Lalung while preparing a report about him, and showed him a copy of Aneisha Sharma's film. Lalung reportedly told him that his name was Machal, and not Machang as shown in the film.
