= Chinatown Days =

Novel by Rita Chowdhury

- Author: Rita Chowdhury
- Translator: Rita Chowdhury
- Language: Assamese
- Genre: Historical fiction
- Set in: Assam, China and Hong Kong
- Publisher: Pan Macmillan India (English edition)
- Publication date: 2010 (Assamese); 2018 (English)
- Pages: 396
- ISBN: 978-1-5098-9656-1

Chinatown Days is a historical novel by the Assamese writer Rita Chowdhury. It was first published in Assamese in 2010 as Makam (মাকাম), named after the town of Makum, and was later translated into English by the author, appearing as Chinatown Days in 2018. The novel follows the Assamese Chinese community of Makum, from the arrival of Chinese tea workers under the East India Company in the nineteenth century to the internment and deportation of the community during the Sino-Indian War of 1962.

== Development and publication ==
Chowdhury had decided to write about the community in 2006, having seen the Assamese Chinese community in the Chinapatty locality of Makum during her college years, and has said that she regards the novel as a mission. She conducted research for the next four years, trying to speak both to Assamese Chinese people still living in India, and those living abroad, but many were reluctant to be interviewed.

The 2010 publication of Makam was 600 pages in the original Assamese.

== Plot ==
The story is framed by a present-day meeting in Hong Kong between an Assamese writer, Arunabh Bora, and Lailin Tham, a woman of Assamese Chinese descent, whose account leads Bora to trace the community's history across two centuries. It recounts how Chinese labourers were brought to Assam to work in the tea plantations, how they assimilated through intermarriage and trade, and how, during the 1962 war, around 1,500 Assamese Chinese from Makum were imprisoned and deported.

== Reception ==
The Assamese original was a commercial success and was reprinted ten times in its first year, and the writer Amitav Ghosh described the novel as a moving saga. Reviewers have regarded the book as an important recovery of a little known chapter of Indian history. Reviewing the English translation for Scroll.in, the Naga novelist Easterine Kire called it untold history that Chowdhury proved more than equal to telling, and praised her handling of the parallel stories of the community and of the Assam tea industry. Its release drew wide attention in Assam and was followed by Chowdhury's public advocacy for recognition of the Assamese Chinese. Reviwing for The Hindu, Geeta Doctor wrote that the book is, at its heart, "also a story of loss and the Indian state's betrayal of a tiny minority of its people." The book has also been the subject of academic peer review in Sage by Jayani Bonnerjee
