= Freedom at the Edge =

- Promotional poster
- Directed by: Aneisha Sharma
- Starring: Indra Bania
- Release date: 2007
- Running time: 27 minutes
- Country: India
- Language: Assamese

Freedom at the Edge is an Assamese language short film by Aneisha Sharma based on a real-life story.

== Synopsis ==
The story is about a youth named Machal Lalung from Middle Assam, who was charged and imprisoned in various Indian jails without trial for 54 years. Indra Bania played the lead role.

== Awards ==
Aneisha Sharma won the "Indie Spec Best Documentary Award" for the film at the 2007 Boston International Film Festival, and received the Kerala State Award for Best Documentary in 2007.

The film was also screened at the 2008 Cannes Film Festival, and as part of the 2008 Mumbai International Film Festival

== Cast ==
- Indra Bania as Machang Lalung, whose name in real life was Machal.

== See also ==
- Jollywood
