= Rita Chowdhury =

Indian writer

- Born: 17 August 1960 (age 66); Tirap, Arunachal Pradesh, India
- Education: M.A., LLB, Ph.D.
- Occupations: Novelist, Poet, Editor
- Spouse: Chandra Mohan Patowary
- Children: 2
- Writing career
- Period: 1981–present
- Genres: Historical fiction, poetry
- Notable works: Deo Langkhui, Makam, Chinatown Days
- Notable awards: Assam Sahitya Sabha award (1981); Sahitya Akademi Award (2008); Assam Valley Literary Award (2017)
- Movement: Assamese literature

Rita Chowdhury (born 1960) is an Indian poet and novelist who writes Assamese literature and is a recipient of the Sahitya Akademi Award. She is the editor of the Assamese literary magazine Gariyoshi and a former director of the National Book Trust, India. She has been associate professor and lecturer at Cotton College, Guwahati, Assam in the Political Science Department and was active in the Assam Movement in the early 1980s.

== Early life and education ==
Chowdhury was born in 1960 to the writer Biraja Nanda Chowdhury at Nampong in Tirap District of Arunachal Pradesh. She did her schooling in Upper Haflong L.P. School and higher secondary in Margherita Public Higher Secondary School. She has spoken of the impact of the death of her older sister from cerebral malaria, including "I think my childhood ended the day she passed away," and how she "read obsessively, as if to try to forget the grief that surrounded me." She has described reading the works of Bankim Chandra, Lakshminath Bezbarua, Sarat Chandra, Rabindranath Tagore, Jyoti Prasad Agarwala, Shankar, and Sankho Maharaj during this time.

Her family moved to Guwahati in 1980, during the Assam Movement; she became involved in the movement and was jailed several times. She was in jail when her first novel was published in 1981.

She holds a postgraduate degree in political science and a postgraduate degree in Assamese, as well as a doctorate in political science and a law degree. She passed her B.A. in political science from Cotton College under Gauhati University in 1982. She is double MA in political science and Assamese from Gauhati University with LLB (1990) and Ph.D.. She did Ph.D. from Gauhati University on Comparative Literature in 2005. Her thesis was on Society and Women psychology depicted in Nirupama Borgohain and Ashapurna Devi's Novels: a Comparative Study.

== Literary career ==
Chowdhury began writing in 1981, during the Assam Movement. She wrote her first novel, Abirata Jatra, within three months, and it was published in 1981. She won an award from the Asom Sahitya Sabha for this book. She then married politician Chandra Mohan Patowary and stopped writing until after the birth of her daughter.

Chowdhury then wrote a series of novels, including Tirthabhumi (The Shrine) in 1988, Maha Jibanar Adharshila (Foundation Stone of Great Life) in 1993, Nayana Tarali Sujata in 1996, Popiya Torar Xadhu (Tale of a shooting star) in 1998, Rag-malkosh in 1999, Jala-Padma (Water-Lotus) in 1999, Hridoy Nirupai (The Helpless Heart) in 2003, Deo Langkhui (The Divine Sword) in 2005, Makam (The Golden Horse) in 2010 and Mayabritta (The Circle of Worldly Illusion) in 2012.

Her poetry collections include Xudoor Nakshatra, Banariya Batahar Xuhuri, Alop Pooharar Alop Andharar, and Boga Matir Tulaxi.

She received Sahitya Akademi Award in 2008 for the novel Deo Langkhui which is based on the Tiwas of Assam. She spent four years writing her novel Makam (মাকাম) in Assamese, and it was published in 2010. After Makam was published, she publicly called for greater acceptance of Assamese people of Chinese origin, and met with Chief Minister Tarun Gogoi in November 2010 as part of her advocacy. In 2015, at a screening of the documentary Wars and Tears that she directed, she advocated for reunification of families separated during the Sino-Indian War in 1962. She also translated Makam into English, and it was published with the title Chinatown Days in 2018.

In 2011, she formed Adharxila, an organisation to support young writers and Assamese literature.

In 2015, she was appointed director of the National Book Trust in India. She resigned in January 2019.

In 2022, she became the editor of the Assam literary magazine Gariyoshi.

== Teaching career ==
Chowdhury started her teaching career as lecturer in political science in Diphu Government College, Karbi Anglong from the year 1989 to 1991. She then worked as lecturer from 1991 to 1996 and as senior lecturer from 1996 to 2001 at Cotton College, Guwahati, Assam in the Political Science Department. She became an associate professor in 2001.

In 2016, she left her position as associate professor to become the director of the National Book Trust in India.

== Selected works ==
=== Novels ===
- Abirata Jatra (Relentless Journey) in 1981 published by Bani Mandir, Dibrugarh
- Thirthabhumi (Pilgrimage) in 1988 published by Deepti Prakashan, Dibrugarh
- Maha Jibanar Adharshila (Foundation of a great life) in 1993 published by Jyoti Prakashan, Dibrugarh
- Nayana Tarali Sujata (Tale of a Meteor) in (1996), published by Lawyer's Book Stall, Guwahati
- Popiya Torar Sadhu (Tale of a Meteor) in 1998 published by Cambridge India, Guwahati
- Ragmalkosh (Water lotus) in (1999), published by Assam Book Depot, Guwahati
- Jala Padma (Water lotus) in 1999 published by Assam Book Depot, Guwahati
- Hridoy Nirupai (The Heart is Helpless) in 2003 published by Jyoti Prakashan, Guwahati
- Deo Langkhui (The Divine Sword) in 2005 published by Jyoti Prakashan, Guwahati
- Ei Xomoi Xei Xomoi
- Makam ("Golden Horse"). Guwahati: Jyoti Prakashan. 2010. ISBN 978-81-920061-0-9.
- Rajib Eshwar
- Jahnabi
- Mayabritta (Circle of Illusion) in 2012 published by Jyoti Prakashan, Guwahati
- Makam (English) in 2015 published by The Pangea House, New Delhi.
- Bibranta Bastab in 2015 published by The Jyoti Prakashan, Guwahati.
- Chinatown Days. New Delhi: Pan Macmillan India. 2018. ISBN 9781509896561.
- The Divine Sword. New Delhi: Pan Macmillan India (published 29 January 2024). 2024. ISBN 9789390742363.

=== Poems ===
- X.udoor Nakshatra (The Far-off Star) in 1989, published by Sofia Publishers, Guwahati
- Banariya Batahar Xuhuri (Whistle of the Wild Wind) in 1996
- Alop Pooharar Alop Andharar (Streaks of Light and Darkness) in 1997 published by Lawyer's Book Stall, Guwahati
- Boga Matir Tulaxi (Black Basil on White Soil) in 1999 published by Lawyer's Book Stall, Guwahati

=== Other works ===
- The Divided Soul (Coffee Table Book) in 2015 published by The Pangea House
- Wars and Tears (Documentary, Director, Script Writer) produced by The Pangea House

== Honours and awards ==
- Assam Sahitya Sabha Award (First Prize awarded in the Manuscript Competition of Novel) in 1981 for the Novel, Abirata Yatra.
- Kalaguru Bishnu Prasad Rabha Award by Assam Sahitya Sabha, new Delhi in 2006 for the novel Deo Langkhui.
- Sahitya Akademi Award, 2008, for the novel Deo Langkhui.
- Felicitated by the Indian Overseas Chinese Organization on 23 May 2010
- Lekhika Samoroh Xahitya Bata in 2011 by Sadou Axom lekhika Samoroh Samittee
- G.A. Kulkarni Award for Translation of the novel, Makam in Marathi Language in 2013 by Goa Hindu association, Mumbai
- The Telegraph Axom Shrestho award (literature), 2016
- Assam Valley Literary Award, 2017
- Ranangan Sanman award, 2021
- Birangana Mulagabharu Award from the Tai Ahom Yuba Parishad, Assam, 2023

== Research ==
- The Chinese Diaspora and 1962 Sino-Indian War
- Tea History of Assam
- Tea Community of Assam
- Tiwa Tribe of Assam.
- The Assamese Chinese Community

== Personal life ==
She is married to the politician Chandra Mohan Patowary. She has a son and a daughter.
