= Indra Bania =

Indian actor, playwright and director (1942-2015)

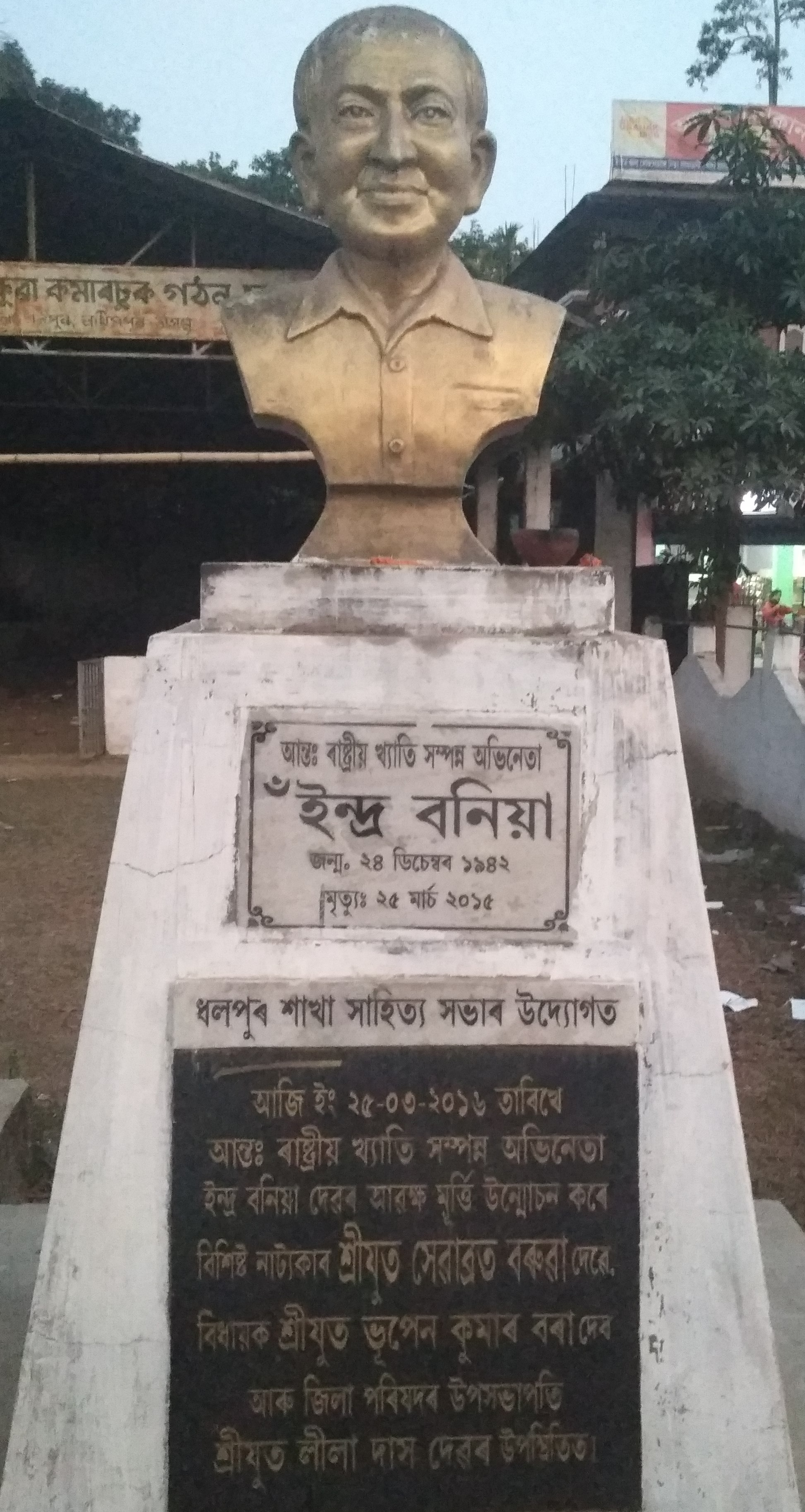
- Bust of Bania in his birth town
- Born: 24 December 1942; Dhalpur, North Lakhimpur, Assam, India
- Died: 25 March 2015 (aged 72); Guwahati, Assam, India
- Occupations: Actor, theatre actor, director, comedian
- Years active: 1960–2015
- Spouse: Minu Bania
- Awards: Silver Leopard Best Actor’s Award (1988), Natasurya Phani Sarma Award (2010)

Indra Bania (24 December 1942 – 25 March 2015) was an Indian theatre actor, playwright, film actor and director from Assam. His performance in Jahnu Barua's Halodhia Choraye Baodhan Khai earned him the Silver Leopard Best Actor's award at the Locarno International Film Festival. He was the recipient of the Natasurya Phani Sarma Award.

== Biography ==
=== Early life ===
Bania was born at Dhalpur village in North Lakhimpur, Assam on 24 December 1942 to an indigenous Brittial Bania (an indigenous Assamese community recognised as a Scheduled Caste). After completing his primary education, in 1958, he came to Guwahati for higher education. While continuing his studies, he began his acting career as a stand up comedian. He started to earn a living through popular comedy shows on the stage, performing across Assam. After completing his education, he worked at Assam State Electricity Board until he retired in 2002.

=== Film and acting career ===
Bania has been a household name in Assam as well as North East India in the field of drama since the 1960s. A regular artiste with All India Radio, Guwahati since 1964, he grabbed the limelight by playing the lead male role in the 1970s play, Gobardhan Charit. He was known for his performance in All India Radio's play, Moinar Sangbad.

In 1988, Jahnu Barua, the best-known filmmaker from Assam, chose Bania to play the lead role of Raseswar Bora in Halodhia Choraye Baodhan Khai. He narrowly missed the best actor's award in the national film festival, although, he was chosen for the Silver Leopard Best Actor's award at the prestigious Locarno Film Festival in Switzerland. The film won the National Film Award for Best Feature Film (Swarna Kamal) award in 1988. In 2007, he portrayed the protagonist in a short film, Freedom at the Edge. The film was based on Machang Lalung, a native of Assam, who was imprisoned for 54 years without trial. The film bagged the Indie Spec Best Documentary Award at Boston International Film Festival in 2007.

Bania had acted in more than 40 Assamese films in a screen career spanning over four decades. he had also directed a few award-winning films besides acting in films and TV serials. He was closely associated with Aikyatan, an amateur theatre group based in Guwahati.

=== Death ===
Bania died on Wednesday, 25 March 2015 at Hayat Hospital in Guwahati, Assam, aged 72, following a prolonged illness.

== Honors and awards ==
- Silver Leopard Best Actor's award in 1988
- Natasurya Phani Sarma Award in 2010

== Filmography ==
- Aparoopa (অপৰূপা) (1982)
- Agnisnaan (অগ্নিস্নান) (1985)
- Halodhia Choraye Baodhan Khai (হালধীয়া চৰায়ে বাওধান খায়) (1987)
- Haladhar (হলধৰ) (1992)
- Daman (Hindi) (2001)
- Freedom at the Edge (2007)
- Aai Kot Nai (আই ক'ত নাই) (2008)
- Aadalat (আদালত)
- Srimati Mahimamoyee (শ্ৰীমতী মহিমাময়ী)
- Apeksha (Hindi)
- Sendur (সেন্দূৰ)
- Puja (পূজা)
- Suruj (সূৰুয)
- Bohagor Duporia (ব’হাগৰ দুপৰীয়া)
- Jetuki (জেতুকী)
- Papori (পাপৰি)
- Dhrubatara (ধ্ৰুৱতৰা)
- Uttarkaal (উত্তৰকাল)
- Ronga Modar (ৰঙা মদাৰ)
- Mimangsha (মীমাংসা)
- Urvashi (উৰ্বশী)
- Jowane Amoni Kore (যৌৱনে আমনি কৰে)
- Matshyagandha (মৎস্যগন্ধা)
- Sesh Upahaar (শেষ উপহাৰ)
- Koina Mur Dhunia (কইনা মোৰ ধুনীয়া)
- Moromi Hobane Logori (মৰমী হ’বানে লগৰী)
- Jangfai Jonak (জাংফাই জোনাক)
- Dhunia Tirutabur
- Samiran Barua Ahi Ase

== See also ==
- Phani Sarma
- Music of Assam
