= Lalong, Peren =

Lalong
- village
- Location Nagaland, India Lalong (India)
- Coordinates: 25.245898°N 93.534870°E
- Country: India
- State: Nagaland
- District: Peren
- Circle: Nsong

Population (2011)
  - Total: 1,423
- Time zone: UTC+5:30 (IST)
- Census code: 268370

Lalong is a village in the Peren district of Nagaland, India. It is located in the Nsong Circle.

== Demographics ==
According to the 2011 census of India, Lalong has 198 households. The effective literacy rate (i.e. the literacy rate of population excluding children aged 6 and below) is 72.66%.

Demographics (2011 Census)
	Total	Male	Female
Population	1423	744	679
Children aged below 6 years	271	140	131
Scheduled caste	0	0	0
Scheduled tribe	1412	737	675
Literates	837	461	376
Workers (all)	560	291	269
Main workers (total)	551	288	263
Main workers: Cultivators	534	276	258
Main workers: Agricultural labourers	0	0	0
Main workers: Household industry workers	2	0	2
Main workers: Other	15	12	3
Marginal workers (total)	9	3	6
Marginal workers: Cultivators	0	0	0
Marginal workers: Agricultural labourers	0	0	0
Marginal workers: Household industry workers	3	0	3
Marginal workers: Others	6	3	3
Non-workers	863	453	410
