= Deo Langkhui =

Novel by Rita Chowdhury

- The Cover of Deo Langkhui
- Author: Rita Chowdhury
- Language: Assamese
- Genre: Novel on Tiwa community
- Published: Jyoti Prakashan (2005)
- Publication place: Assam, India
- Media type: Print (Hardback & Paperback)
- Pages: 416

Deo Langkhui (The Divine Sword) is an Assamese novel written by Dr Rita Chowdhury. The book unveils some important aspects of then-contemporary Tiwa society and a series of their customs and traditions. The novel is based on historical evidence of then Tiwa kingdom, but the protagonist is the royal lady Chandraprabha, queen of Pratapchandra. The book is a detailed account of the time of then Assam. It is full of romance, conflict, betrayal, aggression and loyalty. The novel can be read as a fantastic story, as a historical novel, or as an epic.

Deo Langkhui brought its author the Sahitya Akademi Award for Assamese, by the Sahitya Akademi, India's National Academy of Letters.

== Synopsis ==
The story is about the life-struggle of Chandraprabha, the banished queen of king Pratapsingha. She was sent to the Tiwa Gobha kingdom to marry with the Gobha king (Kobâ rajâ) in the Chunbîl Melâ (Jonbeel Mela).

The Gobha king reveals his chivalry by accepting Chandraprabha as a member of his kingdom. In the Gobha kingdom, Chandraprabha makes herself familiar with the customs of the people. She even changes her name to Konchari, a Tiwa name. Starting from Chandraprabha, the story goes until her great grandson and, thus, in between there are many characters who are fairly rich in their own qualities.

== The writer's approach ==
The writer has shown dexterity in depicting all the characters, their actions, inner conflicts, etc., and gives a message that sex and beauty are not the root of all relations. Besides, she gives a detailed account of that time of Assam. She throws light on social, cultural and some other important aspects its history. She refers to Jonbeel Mela, a symbol of union between the eastern Assam and Western Assam, which becomes a place for exchanging merchandise and a place for exchanging hearts. Through the writer’s dexterity of descriptive power, the novel delves into the readers’ mind like a vivid picture, meticulously reflecting all the aspects of every incident.

== Characters ==
- Chandraprobha/Konchari: Chandraprabha is the queen of Pratapsingha, banished by him to the Gobha king for she had made merry with the latter. In Gobha kingdom Chandraprobha is highly respected by the subjects and she makes familiar herself with its customs and traditions and changes her identity to Konchari.
- Pratapsingha/Mayamatta
- Xadhukumar, the Gobha king, is an exceptional character with boundless respect for women. He gives shelter to Chandraprabha with immense respect. He even never married with a view to give the throne to the child who is yet to be born from Chandraprabha.
- Jungal Balahu (Jakangka), the son of Arimatta and Gangawati and the husband of Xukumola .
- Xonjira, a maid of Konchari and mother of Samol. She was a lovely and polite woman with great sense of humor.
- Arimatta, son of Konchari and king of Kamata.
- Gangawati, queen of Khola state.
- Ratnasingha
- Fa Badacha, the ruler of Kachari Kingdom.
- Xukumola, wife of Jongal Balahu and daughter of Fa Badacha.
- Ratnawali
- Dhaneswar, an informal advisor to the king Fa Badacha and the mastermind of the invasion against the kingdom of Jakangka.
- Samol, son of Xonjira.

== Awards ==
Rita Choudhury won the Kolaguru Bishnuprasad Rabha Award in 2006 and Sahitya Akademi Award in 2008 for this much-acclaimed novel.
