= Shikdamakha =

Village in Assam, India

- Village
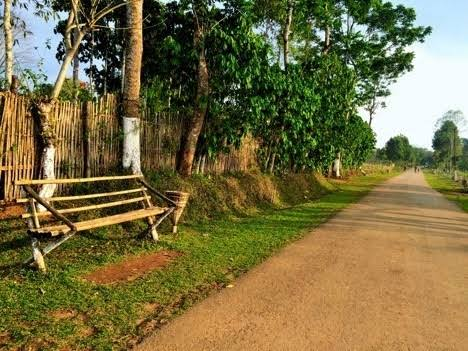
- Shikdamakha Village

- Location in Assam, India Shikdamakha (India)
- Coordinates: 25.9487°N 92.2237°E
- Country: India
- State: Assam
- Region: Hamren
- District: West Karbi Anglong district

Languages
  - Official: English and Assamese
  - Spoken: Tiwa, Karbi, Khasi, English and Hindi
- Time zone: UTC+5:30 (IST)
- PIN: 782413

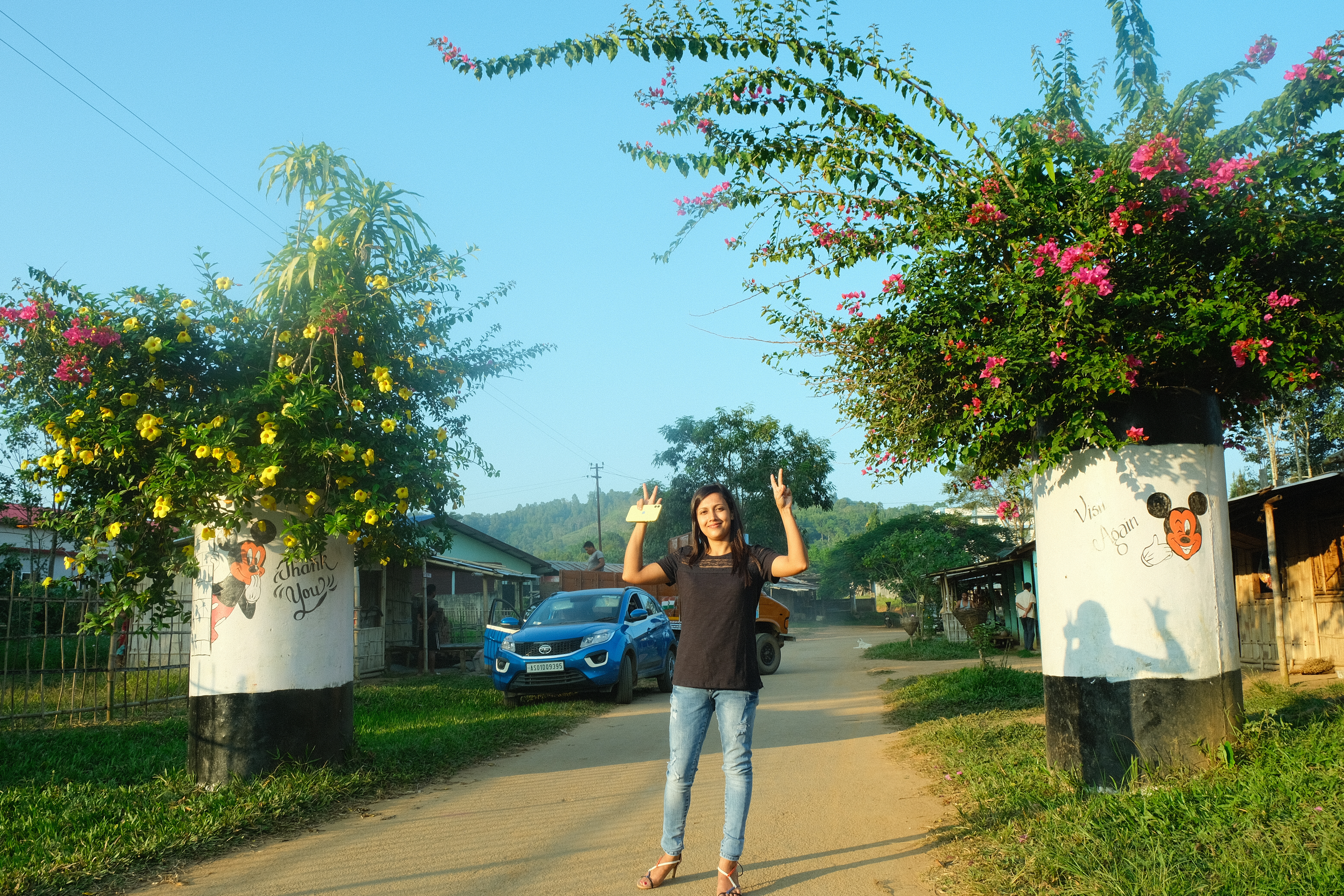
Shikdamakha entrance gate

Shikdamakha (Tiwa village) is a village in the West Karbi Anglong district of Assam state in North East India. It falls under the Amri development block and Vidhan Sabha No.20 Baithalangso ST LAC.

== Etymology ==
The word Shikdamakha in Tiwa language means 'hillocks of traps'. The local folklore suggests that a ghost used to trap humans.

== Geography ==
Shikdamakha is at 25.9487°N 92.2237°E. It lies in the center of the Umswai Valley and is surrounded by hills, two of which are revered in Tiwa tradition: Palakhongor and Shabri Makha. The village is 80 km (50 mi) from the state capital Dispur-Guwahati which can be accessed by road along National Highway 27 (India), a journey of about 2 hours 30 minutes through lush green hills.

== Demographics ==
As per 2011 Population Census report, Shikdamakha is a home to 103 households. Shikdamakha has a population of 595 of which 321 are males and 274 are females. Inhabited by mainly Tiwa tribe people. The people of Shikdamakha are humble and hardworking and 75.15% are literate. It is a Christian dominated village.

== Sanitation ==
On 25 September 2016, the Government of Assam and the Public Health Engineering Department (PHED) named Shikdamakha the cleanest village in the state. On 15 October 2016 the Karbi Anglong Autonomous Council (KAAC) declared Shikdamakha as the cleanest village of West Karbi Anglong district. Villagers use bamboo baskets for storing garbage in front of every household and every corner of the village, and the accumulated garbage is disposed at a regular intervals. Thrice in a week, men and women take part in a community cleaning drive.

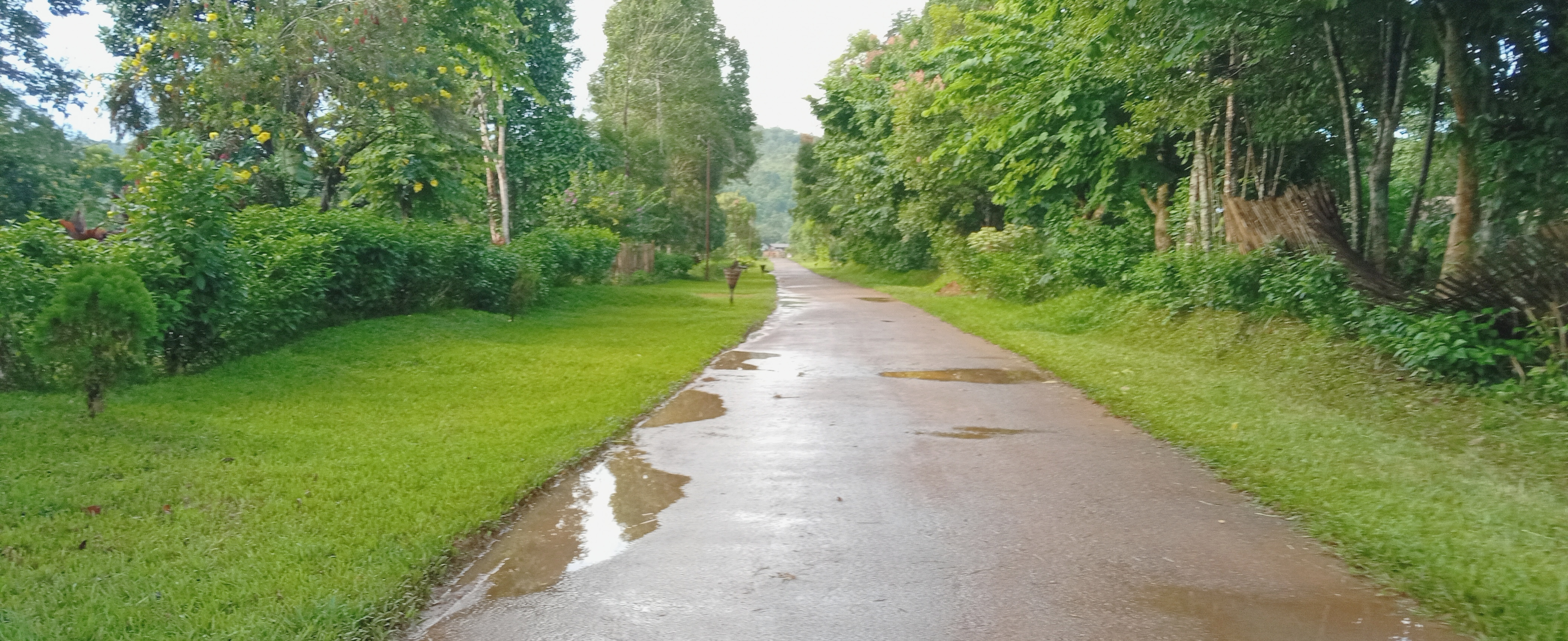
Shikdamakha village road

== Places of interest ==
- Palakhongor:A tourists destination, 6 km (3.7 mi) from the village. It offers a panoramic view of the scenic Umswai Valley.
- Tiwa Monolith:On the top of a small hill in Amsai Pinung (One of the Tiwa root village) 2 km (1.2 mi) away from Shikdamakha, there is a spot that contains more than 2000 rock monoliths. Each of these monoliths is a set of two stone slabs-one base and one body. The Tiwas plant one set every year to honor their ancestors.
- Orchid garden:Visit the Orchid Garden which is just behind the Stadium and admire exceptional orchids that grow around and on trees with their long aerial roots.
- Mary Mother of God Church, Umswai
- Don Bosco Higher Secondary School, Umswai

== See also ==
- West Karbi Anglong district
- Karbi Anglong Autonomous Council
- Umswai
