= Tiwa Autonomous Council =

Legislature in Assam, India

Tiwa Autonomous Council (Tiwashong)

Type
- Type: Autonomous District Council
- Term limits: 5 years

Leadership
- Chief Executive Member: Jiban Chandra Konwar
- Deputy Chief Executive Member: Tulsi Bardoloi

Structure
- Seats: 36 Councillors
- Political groups: Government (35): BJP (33); AGP (2); Opposition (1): INC (1)

Elections
- Voting system: First past the post
- Last election: 2020
- Next election: 2026

Meeting place
- Morigaon, Assam

The Tiwa Autonomous Council (Tiwashong) is one of the Autonomous regions of India for the welfare and protection of the Tiwa people in the Indian State of Assam. It was formed in 1995.

== See also ==
- Tiwa (Lalung)
- Tiwa language (India)
- Matak Autonomous Council
- Kamatapur Autonomous Council
