= Wanshuwa Festival =

Religious festival of the Tiwa

Wanshuwa
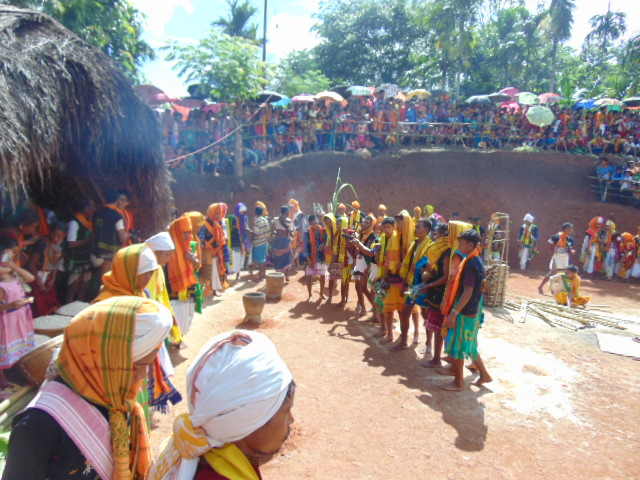
- Genre: Folk
- Frequency: Five year
- Area: Assam and Meghalaya, India
- Patron: Tiwa

Wanshuwa (Tiwa: Wanshúwa) is an important religious festival of the Tiwa living in Amkha and Marjong villages in Karbi Anglong district. It is celebrated once in five or six years. Generally, this festival takes place between June and August. The ceremony usually starts on a Tuesday and ends on a Thursday. The main function takes place on a Wednesday at the residence of Shangdoloi, the head of the village bachelor's dormitory where the "sham" (wooden mortars) are located. These mortars are partly buried underground and arranged in a circular pattern. While dancing to the rhythm of the khram, pangsi and thurang (musical instruments) members of the Shamadi pound the wet rice with a "lomphor" (wooden pestle) till rice is ground to a powder. After the dance, the grounded rice flour is mixed lightly with water and is used to sprinkle on people present at the ceremony. The remaining flour is distributed among the villagers to prepare wanrusa, a type of steamed rice cake. The next morning they bring the wanrusa to the Shangdoloi’s house and offer it to the deities Sodonga Raja and Maldewa Raja. By the late evening of Thursday, the Wanshuwa festival (Wanshúwa Kham) comes to an end. The Tiwa of the Amkha and Marjong group considers the Wankuri or the flour pounded on the day of the Wanshuwa festival to be sacred rice.

== History of Wanshuwa Festival (Wanshúwa Kham) ==
According to a legend associated with the Wanshuwa ceremony,
