= Tiwa language (India) =

Tibeto-Burman language spoken in India

Tiwa
- Lalung (লালুং)
- তিৱা / Tiwa
- Native to: India
- Region: Assam, Meghalaya
- Ethnicity: 371,000 approx. Tiwa (Lalung) (2011 census)
- Native speakers: 33,921 (2011 census)
- Language family: Sino-Tibetan: Tibeto-Burman; Sal; Bodo–Garo; Bodo; Tiwa
- Writing system: Tiwa Mor (Latin Script) & Assamese

Language codes
- ISO 639-3: lax
- Glottolog: tiwa1253
- ELP: Tiwa
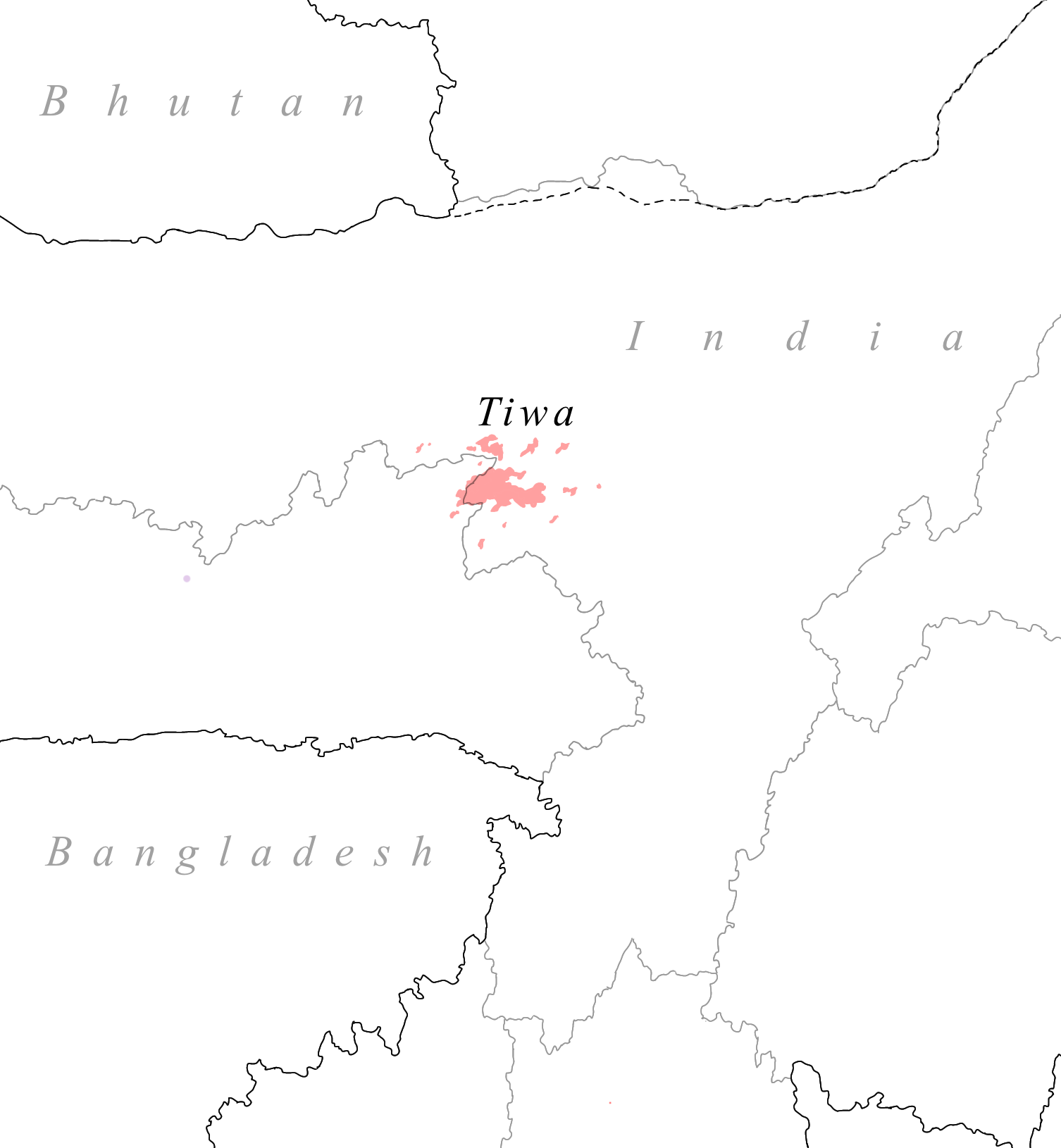
- Map of the Tiwa (Lalung) Language

Tiwa (Lalung) is a Tibeto-Burman (Sino-Tibetan) language spoken by the Tiwa people in Assam and Meghalaya in North East India. Tiwa language is similar to Boro, Dimasa, Kokborok and Garo language of India.

== Tiwa dialects ==
Tiwa is spoken in northwestern Karbi Anglong district and further north in parts of Morigaon District / Nagaon district in the plains of Assam. There is a cluster of Tiwa villages in the northeastern Ri-Bhoi District of Meghalaya. For want of precise knowledge, it is difficult to speak of strictly delimited Tiwa dialects. On the one hand, Tiwa, probably with the exception of the variety of Tiwa spoken near Sonapur in Assam, is a single language, any of its dialects being mutually intelligible with any other. On the other hand, some lexical items, like the few given below for five different varieties of Tiwa (Tiwa speaking areas/villages - Marjông, Amsái, Magró, Amkhâ, and Rongkhói, also referred to as Marj, Ams, Magr, Amkh and Rong respectively further below), show enough variety to arouse one's curiosity. (We did not undertake any systematic study of Tiwa dialectal variation. There may well be other varieties, and it may be possible to group them together in some way.) For example:

A crowbar with a flat blade
Marjông (Marj)	Amsái (Ams)	Magró (Magr)	Amkhâ (Amkh)	Rongkhói (Rong)
khôja chonggól/khôja parí	khûji parí	khôdali (parí)	chonggól parí	chonglá parí

A rake
Marjông (Marj)	Amsái (Ams)	Magró (Magr)	Amkhâ (Amkh)	Rongkhói (Rong)
changkhâm parí	chengkhrâ parí	chobogâ	chengkhânang parí	changkhâm parí

Spider
Marjông (Marj)	Amsái (Ams)	Magró (Magr)	Amkhâ (Amkh)	Rongkhói (Rong)
chãmái	changmái	chambé	chamái	chamái

Tadpole
Marjông (Marj)	Amsái (Ams)	Magró (Magr)	Amkhâ (Amkh)	Rongkhói (Rong)
ngá peré	remthól	kremthól	prethél	lerógai/kremthó

Grey treepie (a bird)
Marjông (Marj)	Amsái (Ams)	Magró (Magr)	Amkhâ (Amkh)	Rongkhói (Rong)
kogé rothôk	kogrêk págrek	konggé latháp	konglék	konglék

The words for fish (ngá in Marj and Ams, and ná in others) are less divergent and may offer a way of dividing the dialects into some groups. The Marjông dialect (spoken in Marjông and its affiliated villages) forms the basis of this language topic. However, wherever possible the dialectal synonyms of Amsái, Margó and Amkhâ have also been given, The Marj and Ams varieties are perfectly mutually intelligible, although the two groups easily recognize the differences in the other group.

Tiwa dialectal variations appear to be clustered around groups of villages that are held together by Tiwa religio-cultural rituals and celebrations that are traditionally held in a particular village and are centered around a priest (loró) who resides there. Such alliances of villages also had their own geographic area of jurisdiction (sîma) and lands for cultivation. The priest and the regular conduct of rituals and ceremonies gave such groups of villages socio-cultural cohesion. The earlier traditional system, which must have had stricter village coalitions, has suffered marginal disintegration in recent times.

In West Karbi Anglong district, the villages of Marjông, Amsái, Rongkhói, Amnî Baró and Amnî Sá still have their priests. The priest of the Amrî section now resides in Boksong. A Tiwa group is known as Amkhâ, which had its center at Suphing (also in West Karbi Anglong), got dispersed and does not have a priest at present.

In the Ri-Bhoi District of Meghalaya, the villages of Amjông, Lumphúi, and Phat Magró have their functioning priests even now. There is a section of Tiwa's in and around Mayông (Northeast Meghalaya), but there is no Mayông priest at the present time. It is believed that as only a person from the Maslông clan could become a priest when there was no one to inherit the priestly mantle at the death of the last Mayông priest, their priestly lineage came to an end, The Maslóng clan itself seems to have disappeared. The priest of the Sâgra section (also in Meghalaya) appears to have lost his ritual area of influence. The same is true of a section of Tiwa's known as Ligrâ that does not have a functioning priest now.

== Language and geographical distribution ==
Tiwa is spoken in the following districts (Ethnologue).

- Assam
  - East Karbi Anglong and West Karbi Anglong districts
  - Nagaon district
  - Morigaon district
  - Kamrup district
  - Dhemaji district
- Meghalaya
  - Khasi Hills district (Ri-Bhoi district)

== Script ==
Like most languages of the hill tribes of Northeast, India, Tiwa people do not have their own script. They use the Roman (Latin) script and occasionally use Assamese script.

=== Tiwa alphabet ===
Tiwa in Latin script has a different system, distinct from that of English. Tiwa uses a 24-letter alphabet by removing the letters F, Q, V, X and Z from the basic Latin alphabet and adding the diacritic letters ′ , ^ and ~ namely thópti, thópkho and kungái which is treated as a letter in its own right. Tiwa alphabet have 5-letter vowels and 16-letter consonant.

Tiwa Alphabet (Tiwa Mor)
Capital letters (Tóra Mor)	A	B	CH	D	E	G	H	I	J	K	L	M	N	O	P	R	S	T	U	W	Y	′	^	~
Small letters (Chokhá Mor)	a	b	ch	d	e	g	h	i	j	k	l	m	n	o	p	r	s	t	u	w	y	′	^	~
English pronunciation	ah	bee	chee	dee	ay	gay	esh	ee	jay	kay	ell	emm	enn	ow	pee	aar	ess	tee	woo	double yu	why	thoptee	thopkow	koowai
Assamese pronunciation	আ	বি	চি	ডি	এ	গে	এইচ্	ই	জে	কে	এল্	এম	এন্	অ	পি	আৰ্	এচ্	টি	উ	ডাৱলিউ	ৱাই	থপ্তি	থপ্ক	কুঙাই

Tiwa Vowels (Tiwa Khúrang Mor)
Tiwa	A	E	I	O	U
Assamese pronunciation	আ	এ	ই	অ	উ

Tiwa Consonant (Tiwa Chor Mor)
Tiwa	B	CH	D	G	H	J	K	L	M	N	P	R	S	T	W	Y
Assamese pronunciation	বি	চি	ডি	গে	এইচ্	জে	কে	এল্	এম	এন্	পি	আৰ্	এচ্	টি	ডাৱলিউ	ৱাই

== The spelling system ==
The Tiwa orthographic tradition (which is based on the Roman alphabet) is to a large extent straightforward; the letters represent the sounds they are generally associated with. However, exceptions in the language's sound system itself calls for some adjustments to be made in some areas. We consider below a few such areas. Check the Tiwa Mor (Tiwa Alphabet) chart below.

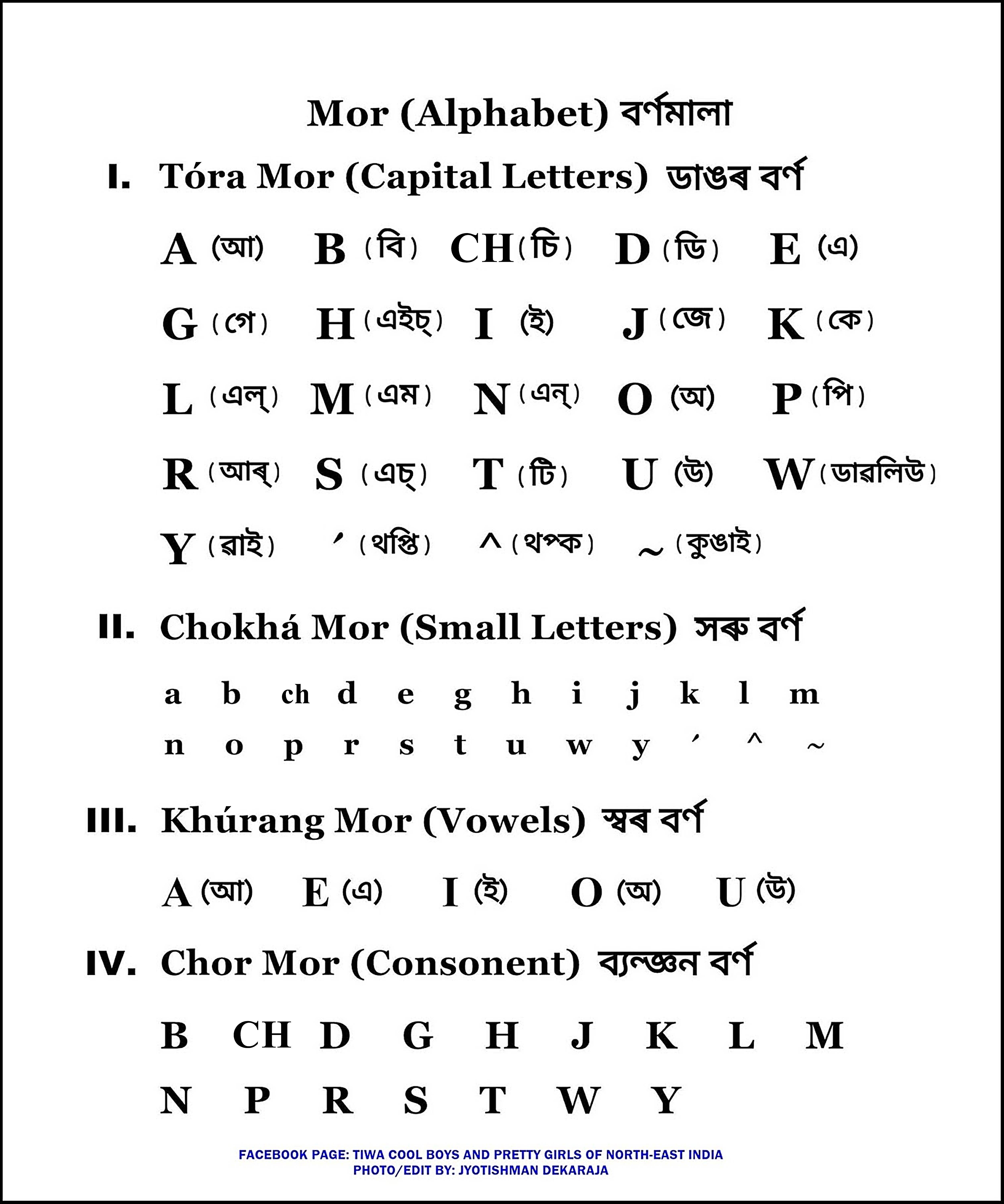
Tiwa Mor (Tiwa Alphabet)

Tiwa does not use sounds that require the use of the letters f, q, v, x, z. It does not have b, d, j, and g in the word-initial and word-final positions (by a word we mean we morpheme without any affixes); ch- occurs only in the beginning of words (in the middle of a word it may occur as a cluster with p, t, k which are all voiceless plosive sounds). There is no contrast between c and ch in Tiwa; the sound represented by ch is an unaspirated sound in Tiwa. Keeping to the local orthographic practice, ch has been used in this topic.

In the word-initial position b, d, j, and g occur in a few words, most of them of recent origin. In some instances, one of these can be seen as being protected by a preceding word with which it co-occurs in a fixed manner, as in kher bon 'thatch and other types of grass', which we take as two words as they have their own tones (in this case, the falling tone that is unmarked here), The same can be said of the adverbial bén in hûldi bén 'very yellowish', and a few other words beginning with b, d, j, and g.

Tiwa does not have word-medial p, t, c(h), k. They may occur as clusters in each other's company as in shíkta 'animal-trap', apcháp 'haphazardly', the recently coined thópti 'acute accent', and others. When a vocalic suffix is added to a root that has p, t, k as its final consonant, that final p, t, k gets voiced to b, d, and g respectively, as in ráp- 'help' > rápa [rába] 'to help' or rápo [rábo] 'will help'. A similar situation arises when ti- 'two' is prefixed to a noun or a numeral classifier that has an initial p, t, c(h) or k, as in tin 'day' > titin [tidin] 'two days'. However, in all such instances p, t, and k have been used consistently.

There are a handful of exceptions where the unproductive nature of the suffix, as in thrúba thrúbi 'unnoticed; quietly' (which we recognize as related to thrúp thráp in a hidden manner'), has forced us to keep the new voiced medial. A similar point can be said about chebé chabá 'in a damp and wet manner', which is recognizable as related to chép chép (and the reduplicated chép chép cháp cháp) 'Wet and muddy', where the established tone shift to the right makes a case for the medial voiced -b- even stronger.

The word thuke 'till' (a postposition) is of a different type; the final -e is an adverbial suffix. Here medial k really sounds k and not g. As a matter of fact, it is pronounced as [thukke] or [thuk-e]. The morpheme boundary is not disturbed by suffixation. There are other similar instances that involve consonants other than a plosive, like mile [mil-e] 'all, everything', chile [chil-e] 'as having a shiny film or sheen' and chole [chol-e] 'as whole grains'.

There are some recently borrowed words where the medial p, t, k are really voiceless consonants, like:

- kalapân – Spades (of cards)
- thin pati – A type of card game
- ita – Brick
- riti – File
- ritî tustûr – Customs and traditions
- eka – Ace (in a pack of cards)
- duki – Card mark 2
- rekót – Record

In all such instances, the syllabification is such that these medial consonants are syllable initials. The above words would be syllabified as [ka-la-pan], [thin pa-til], [i-ta], [e-ka], [ri-ti], [du-ki] and [re-kót]. There are many such examples, and we may make a guess that they are on the increase.

Tiwa's tendency to avoid b-, d-, j-, g- (voiced plosives) in the initial position and -p-, -t-, -ch-, -k- (voiceless plosives) in the middle of a simple word places a burden on the speakers when naturalizing borrowed words. If the free variations pon ~ bon 'strike (where bon is more common), tobôl ~ dobôl ~ dabûl 'double' (where dobôl ~ dabûl is gaining ground) and methêng ~ medêng ~ mitîng 'meeting' (where methêng ~ medêng are getting more and more rare) are any indication, we can make a safe bet that voiced initial plosives (ie, b-, d-, j- g-) and voiceless medial plosives (ie, -p-, -t-, -ch-, -k-) will get more and more established in the language.

== Nasalization in Tiwa ==
Although not widespread in the language, Tiwa has nasalization [marked with the tilde called kungái ( ~ ) in Tiwa] as a phoneme. Even among the few nasalized Tiwa words, we can spot minimal pairs like:

- rew rew – Accompanied by an unpleasant feeling
- rẽw rẽw – (Onomatopoeia) slow repetitive squeaky noise
- praw praw – (Onomatopoeia) of splashing water
- prãw prãw – (Onomatopoeia) of the humming of bees

Nasalization may co-occur with either of the tones. As a convention when nasalization co-occurs with the falling tone on a monosyllabic root, only the nasalization is marked.

== Tiwa tones ==
Tiwa has two phonemic tones: a falling tone (marked with a circumflex except on one-syllable words where it is unmarked) called thópkho ( ^ ) in Tiwa, and a rising tone (marked with the acute accent) called thópti ( ′ ) in Tiwa.

- re – And
- ré – Cloth
- cha – Not have
- chá- – Eat
- rom- – Engage (for work)
- róm- – Catch
- shu- – Peck, gore
- shú- – Pound

Polysyllabic words have just one tone, that may occur on any one of the syllables.

=== Tone shift and tone change ===
There is a tendency for the tone to shift to the right in actual speech. In some compounds the tone shift is an established part of the word: tudí 'egg' (< tú 'bird'; chicken), moná (< mó 'eye' and dative -na) in moná chína 'to like' and the adverbial/aspectual manó (< mán- 'get' and non-past -o). There are a few instances where the tonal shift occurs across the word-boundary, as in: kidâp 'book', but hísap kídap 'account', and shêna 'strip' but ngá shéna (~ ngáshena) 'fish cut into strips'.

Sometimes a word turns up with a different tone when it enters into a compound. This phenomenon is not uniform across the different dialects of Tiwa. In the Marjông dialect there is tingkhí 'leg-mortar' and thá tingkhî 'a variety of yam (that looks like the pestle of a leg-mortar)'; similarly musí 'rat' and musî chelé 'a variety of mousetrap'. In the Amsái dialect their equivalents are thá tingkhí and musí chelé, without the tone change. Other examples are musí 'rat' and musî chelé 'a type of mousetrap'; khễya 'a medium-sized palm tree with sweet-scented flowers' and khum khễya 'the sweet-scented flowers of this palm tree'; sháguni 'porous sieving basket' and shak shâguni 'to purify'.

=== Marking the tones ===
In this topic the high tone is marked in all instances. Two conventional rules have been followed in marking the falling tone:

(1) monosyllabic roots having a falling tone are not marked for tone. Accordingly, tan [tân] 'offering' is not marked for its falling tone, while tán [tán-] 'cut' is marked for its high tone. We did not extend this rule to include the falling tone on all first-syllables, in order to be able to have a visual clue to differentiate words like shuwa (< shu- 'peck' and -wa 'nominalizer suffix') 'the pecking' and shûwa 'rubbish, impurity'.

(2) The adverbs such as mile 'all, everything', lore 'as having a shiny film or sheen', chole 'as whole grains' and many others are analyzed as having a monosyllabic root and the adverbial suffix -e; following rule (1) such adverbs are unmarked, if they have a falling tone. In some cases the root is also a free word (ie a morpheme), while many of them are no longer free morphemes in the present state of the language.

=== Polysyllabic roots and tones ===
The area of polysyllabic roots is a difficult area for tonal analysis. There are no straight forward minimal pairs of bare roots (even among disyllabic roots) that are differentiated by the position of the same tone, We do have examples like kojá 'red' and kojâ- 'be free; have free time'; or, rojá- 'sing' and rojâ- 'thick'.

The Amsái dialect does have some examples, like sarí 'whetstone' (which in Marjông is sárai) and sári 'a little' as in kai sári 'a little each'; khagái 'baby boy' (which in Marjông is kháisa) and khágai- 'tie paddy bundle in the middle'; ná-na 'to enter', na-na 'to appear' and naná (< indaná) 'why'.

Tiwa appears to have a preference for disyllabic roots. Tiwa does have several 3-syllable words, but 3-syllable roots also tend to have a secondary tone, as in shorondó [shôrondó]. This may partially be governed by the segmental constitution of the initial syllable itself. Four syllable roots tend to be split into two disyllabic words, with two tones, as in tariphûra [tarî-phûra] 'tree-less and open (land)', shuguphûra [shûgu-phûra] 'hypocritical (masc)' and hâbuskharya [hâbus-khârya] 'greedy'.

=== Polysyllabic minimal pairs ===
It is difficult to come across polysyllabic roots that are differentiated by the position of the same tone. One instance we have encountered is milâi- 'be in agreement' and mîlai ~ milâi (two variants of mile) 'everything'. Following the second conventional rule regarding marking falling tones, mile (analyzed to be built on the monosyllabic root mil-) is not marked for its falling tone. The interaction of roots and suffixes gives rise to a number of such minimal pairs. We have:

- chána — To eat (chá- 'eat' and the infinitive -na)
- chaná/chana — That there may not be (cha 'there be not' and the infinitive -na)
- cháwa — The eating (chá- 'eat' and the nominalizer -wa)
- chawa — To sift (chaw- 'sift' and the infinitive -a)
- chawá/chawa — That which is not there (cha 'there be not' and the nominalizer wa)
- khúla — To scoop; to serve out (khúl- 'scoop' and the infinitive -na)
- khulá — Land where cotton is cultivated (< khul 'cotton' and há 'land')

=== Partial predictability of the Tiwa falling tone ===
The segmental composition of the disyllabic roots (which make up the bulk of the polysyllabic roots in Tiwa) gives a clue as to where a falling tone would be, if that root has a falling tone. If such a root has a syllable with h, s, sh, ph, th or kh as the initial (note that ch is excluded) the falling tone would be on that syllable. Examples are: hûri 'winged white ant', sâra 'care, concern', asî 'aunt', shôron 'echo form of lat 'shame', phâmdim 'rheumatism', mathî 'world', khûnda 'post', makhâ 'hill'. Polysyllabic roots that have two or more syllables with these consonants (as in shâsi 'insect; germ') probably follow some pattern; but we have not studied them systematically.

If a disyllabic root does not have a syllable with h, s, sh, ph, th or kh, then the falling tone would be (with some exceptions) on the final syllable, as in mindâi 'deity', mandâr 'tree (variety)', alî 'path', rogôm 'method', muyûm 'acne; pimple'.

As a further proof of this pattern in Tiwa, we have variations like khâru/karû (echo forms of kahâ 'wound'), khûndar/kundâr (echo forms of andâr 'dark') and chenê tenê/thêne 'somehow', In the same direction we have karôn 'reason' and khâron 'reason' (as in khâron kóna 'give news of somebody's death to the village priest') borrowed from Assamese কাৰণ (kāran) 'reason'.

The marking of tones could have been made simpler by taking advantage of this behaviour of Tiwa and by not marking the falling tone on 2-syllable roots. However, we have resisted from taking this step for two reasons:

(1) There are a few words (most of them, if not all, peripheral, onomatopoeic or recent words) that do not follow this rule. Some of them are:

- îni/hîni — Look here!
- ûya/hûya — Look there!
- îya — Interjection (of surprise)
- îngguri — Enquiry
- êngleng — Cicada (variety, onomatopoeia)
- pâiling — Cicada (variety, onomatopoeia)
- kûrleng — Cicada (variety, onomatopoeia), (Ams khúrleng)

And, (2) if we mark all the polysyllabic roots for the falling tone, we get a visual clue to differentiate such homophones as:

- parê- — Increase, grow in number
- pare — Of the week (< par 'week')
- pare — Of the wind (< par 'wind')

In the first instance parê- is the root, while in the second and third instances par 'week' and par 'wind' are the roots (whose falling tones are not marked because they are monosyllabic roots). The same is true of parâ 'more' and par-a 'to bloom', shuwa (< shu- 'peck') 'the pecking' and — 'rubbish, impurity'. Similarly, we have: lore [lor-e] 'suddenly (of spurts)' and lorê- 'give chase', lele [lel-e] 'as protruding' and lelê- 'incite; instigate'. See Polysyllabic Minimal Pairs for mile [mîl-e] ~ mîlai ~ milâi 'everything', a word that, with its variants, straddles the area of the regular rule and that of the exceptions.

== Tiwa suffixes and tones ==
Tiwa suffixes are of four types:

1. Suffixes that do not have an inherent tone. These suffixes are coloured by the tone that precedes them. These may be considered true suffixes, and to this category belongs suffixes like the infinitive −(n)a, the dative −(n)a, the nominalizer −(w)a, the non-past −w/-o, the optative −thong, the conditional −gai, the negative −y and the present −do.

After the negative −ya (which itself belongs to this group) all the suffixes of group (1) (except −do and −w/-o which do not co-exist with −ya) have the peculiar behaviour of taking the rising tone. Accordingly, we have, phiwa 'the coming; somebody who is coming' and phiyawá 'the not coming, who is not coming'; os 'to give' and osyaná 'not to give'. The spelling system used in Tiwa language incorporates this phenomenon. The chart below represents the rather complex behaviour of these suffixes (in the Amsái and Marjông dialects) when they are used after cha 'there be not'.

Suffix after cha 'no'	Marjông	Amsái
Genitive −ne	-ne/-né	-ne/-né
Nominalizer −wa	-wa/-wá	-wa/-wá
Optative −thong	-thong (with an intrusive −i)	-thóng (with an intrusive −i)
Infinitive −na	-na	-na/-ná
Conditional −gai	-gai	-gai/-gái
Present −do	-do (with an intrusive −i)	-do (with an intrusive −i)

This generates a complex situation with many free variations such as chane/chané 'because there is not' (Marj and Ams), chawa/chawá 'that which is not there' (Marj and Ams), chagai 'if there isn't' (Marj), (but chagai/chagái in Ams), chana 'to be not' (Marj) (chana/chaná in Ams), chaithong (Marj) (but chaithóng in Ams), chaido 'there isn't' (Marj and Ams). In this topic the forms chana, chane, chawa, chagai, chaithong and chaido have been preferred because they are the regular forms and are common to both Marj and Ams.

2. Suffixes that have an inherent falling tone. Some of the suffixes that belong to this set are the instrumental −rê, the plural −râw and −mân, −bô 'also' and −dô, −lô, −sê that generate different shades of emphasis.

3. Suffixes that have an inherent rising tone. To this group belongs the imperative −bó and −thó as well as the non-continuative −khá.

4. The directional suffix −jing is all by itself; it takes the falling tone when preceded by the rising tone and vice versa. So we have nójîng 'towards the house' but tijíng 'to the water source/well'.

A general characteristic of Tiwa is that the tones, whether the falling or the rising tone, spread to the right until they encounter the opposite unyielding tone, after which that new tone colours the following syllables, till that itself is encountered by the other tone in a stubborn pose. This principle is used in marking the tones of the syllables of larger words in this dictionary, and appears to capture the essence of the Tiwa tonal behaviour. Some examples are given below:

- (1) phiyasekhá – S/he will definitely not come
- (2) phiyakhásê – S/he will not come (and nothing can be done about it)
- (3) Nábô phiwbó/líwbo bo! – (I) suppose you too will come/go (along)!
- (4) pibúrlôbó – It is indeed they

In (1) phiyasekhá the falling tone of phi− (unmarked here being a monosyllable) 'come' spreads across to the negative marker −ya and the emphatic se, but was stopped by the non-continuative khá. The situation is similar in (2) phiyakhásê; we also notice that −se arrested the rising tone of khá. In (3) phiwbó is an instance where −bó did not yield to the falling tone of phi− ; and líwbo shows how the rising tone of −bó just merged along with that of lí−. The example (4) has pibúr 'they' and two unyielding suffixes: emphatic −lô and definitive −bó.

== More about Marjông and Amsái ==
Marjông and Amsái, only four kilometers apart by road from village centre to village centre [or, from cultural house (shámadi) to cultural house] and separated only by a broad swath of paddy-land, show a considerable amount of dialectal differences. Apart from the situations where Marjông and Amsái use different words for the same concept, there are others where the differences are only segmental and tonal, but very evident:

Marjông Dialect	Amsái Dialect	English Meaning
shânli	shândi	Flat round sieving basket
lawbé	lawphé	Rind (variety)

=== Tonal differences between Marjông and Amsái ===
The tonal differences between Marjông and Amsái make an interesting point of study. If the two dialects agree that a particular word has a falling tone, then the two dialects place the falling tone on the same syllable in a word. We did not come across any instances where the two dialects have the falling tone on different syllables of a word. However, there are a few of instances where the two dialects have different tones, as in:

Marjông Dialect	Amsái Dialect	English Meaning
ajadî	ajádi	Effortlessly
amaidí	amaidî	Sleep
apcháp	apchâp	Carelessly
chenthôr	chenthór	Spinning wheel
anthlâ	anthlá	Dress (variety)
eké	ekê	The same
longkhrâ	longkhrá	Left over (from the previous meal, day or session)
nunâi	nunái	Baby
mewâ	mewá	Male
thûngi	thungúi; thungí	Tree-house
khôjo	khojó	Cough
panthâ	panthá	Packet of rice
shûpti	shúpti	Spittle

The two dialects exploit the position of the rising tone in polysyllabic roots even to a greater degree. Below are but a few of the many instances:

Marjông Dialect	Amsái Dialect	English Meaning
hándo	handó	Section
hóndo	hondó	Hiccup
chakhlá	chákhla	Ladder; flight of stairs
amukhá	amúkha	So-and-so; some indefinite person

=== Partial predictability of the rising tone in the Marjông dialect ===
A closer look at these disyllabic words that have the high tone on different syllables in Marj and Ams reveals that Marj extends the rule explained in 5.5 (Partial Predictability of the Tiwa Falling Tone) regarding the falling tone to include the high tone, while Ams does not follow this rule for the high tone. That is, if a disyllabic word with a high tone has a syllable with h, s, sh, ph, th or kh as the initial, then in the Marjông dialect, the high tone (with some exceptions) will be on that syllable, while this is not the case in the Amsái dialect.

Marjông Dialect	Amsái Dialect	English Meaning
khábal	khabál	Head
khíni	khuní	Hair
Húgai	Hugái	A clan name
chashéna	cháshena	Offer
phágra	phagrá	Father
shégal	shegál	Evil spirit
thábrap	thabráp	Lungs

A further proof for the above rule comes from the following table of words.

Marjông Dialect	Amsái Dialect
thúgra/tugrá	thúgra/túgra
thúgla/tuglá	thúgla/túgla
thúgu thúgu/tugú tugú	thugú thugú

== Borrowings into Tiwa ==
Tiwa appears to have made good use of the languages that it came into contact with in its past and is surrounded by at present, to enhance its store of words and linguistic devises. Borrowings from the Indo-Aryan languages Assamese/Bengali and Hindi/Nepali and, to a lesser extent, from the Austro-Asiatic Khasi (or Pnar) and the Tibeto-Burman Karbi are discernible in the Tiwa lexicon. Today's educated persons sprinkle English words generously into their speech.

=== Borrowings from Assamese ===
The main source of borrowing appears to be Assamese. In transcribing the Assamese words the following convention has been used:

ক ( k ) খ ( kh ) গ ( g ) ঘ ( gh ) ঙ ( ng )

চ ( c ) ছ ( ch ) জ ( j ) ঝ ( jh ) ঞ ( nya )

ট ( ʈ ) ঠ ( ʈh ) ড ( ɖ ) ঢ ( ɖh ) ণ ( ɳ )

ত ( t ) থ ( th ) দ ( d ) ধ ( dh ) ন ( n )

প ( p ) ফ ( ph ) ব ( b ) ভ ( bh ) ম ( m )

য ( y ) ৰ ( r ) ল ( l ) ৱ ( w )

শ ( s̪ ) ষ ( sh ) স ( s ) হ ( h )

ক্ষ ( ks̪ ) ড় ( r̪ ) ঢ় ( r̪h ) য় ( y )

The vowel symbols used are: ɑ (অ), ā ( আ ), i ( ই ), ī ( ঈ ), ē ( এ ), u ( উ ), ū ( ঊ ) and o ( ও ).

A brief analysis of the way Tiwa has accommodated the Indo-Aryan borrowings is outlined below. The orthographic forms of the Assamese words, rather than the phonemic forms, are taken for analysis, which is mostly restricted to the initials.

1. Initial Assamese voiceless plosives (aspirated and unaspirated), excluding the palatals, are realised as voiceless aspirated plosives in Tiwa. Accordingly, প (p) and ফ (ph) become ph, while ট (t), ঠ (th), ত (ʈ) and থ (ʈh) become th; ক (k) and খ (kh) become kh in Tiwa.

Assamese	Tiwa	English
কমাৰ (kɑmār)	khâmar	Blacksmith
কানি (kāni)	khâni	Opium
কোন (kōn)	khon	Corner
খৰচ (khɑrɑc)	khôros	Expense
খাজনা (khājɑnā)	khâjona	Tax
খেতৰ (khētɑr)	khêdor	Goblin; type of spirit
টকা (ʈɑkā)	thâga	Money
কেলা (ʈēkēlā)	thêgla	Angel; messenger
টেমা (ʈēmā)	thêma	Small container (especially for lime)
ঠগ (ʈhɑg)	thok	Feature; shape
ঠেঙা (ʈhēngā)	thênga	Pants
ঠোলা (ʈhōla)	thôla	Cone
তৰােৱাল (tɑrōwāl)	thrûwal	Sword
তিৰী (tirī)	thîri	Woman
তুলা (tulā)	thûla	Cotton
থল (thɑl)	thol	Lowlands
থান (thān)	than	Place
থাৰা (thōrā)	thôra (parí)	Pestle (of a leg-operated mortar)
পিতল (pitɑl)	phîdul	Brass
পদম (pɑdɑm)	phûdum	Lotus
পথাৰ (pɑthar)	phádar	Paddy-field
ফটিকা (phɑʈikā)	phûdiga	Distilled liquor'
ফাটক (phaʈɑk)	phâdek	Prison
ফিতা (phita)	phîda	Wick; tape

2. Initial Assamese unaspirated voiced plosives, including the palatal, are realized as voiced unaspirated plosives in Tiwa. Accordingly, গ (g), জ (j), ড (ɖ) as well as দ (d) and ব (b) turn out as k, c(h), t and p respectively in Tiwa.

Assamese	Tiwa	English
গৰাকী (gɑrākī)	korakhî	Master
গাল (gāl)	kal	Cheek
গীত (gīt)	kit	Song
জৰী (jɑrī)	churí	Rope
জাত (jāt)	chat	Tribe
জোৰা (jōrā)	chorâ	Joint
ডাবৰ (ɖābɑr)	tabôr	Basin
ডাঙৰি (ɖāngɑri)	tangrî	Sheaf (of paddy)
ডুবি (ɖubi)	tubî	Deep place in a river
দলঙ (dɑlɑng)	tolông	Bridge
দস্তুৰ (dɑstur)	tustûr	Custom
দিন (din)	tin	Day
বজাৰ (bɑjār)	pajâr	Market
বাৰ (bārɑ)	parô	Twelve
বেলেগ (bēlēg)	pelêk	Different

3. Initial Assamese voiced aspirates appear to have taken two main routes depending on the number of syllables of the word:

(a) monosyllabic words having such initials become disyllabic words in Tiwa by splitting apart the place-of-articulation and the aspiration, accompanied by devoicing of the consonant. Although there are not many examples, the pattern is evident.

Assamese	Tiwa	English
ঘৰ (ghɑr)	kohôr	House-hold
ঘাই (ghāi)	kahâi	Chief person
ঝাক (jāk/jhāk)	chahâk	Herd
ধাৰ (dhār)	tahâr	Edge
ভাগ (bhāg)	pahâk	Share; portion
ভাঙ্ (bhāng)	pahâng	Hemp

(b) polysyllabic words (of which disyllabic words are in the majority) undergo two changes: the aspiration is just ignored and the consonant is devoiced.

Assamese	Tiwa	English
ঘণ্টা (ghɑɳʈā)	kondâ	Hour
ঘিলা (ghilā)	kilâ	Wheel
ঘুগুৰা (ghugurā)	kugurâ	Small tinkling bell
ঘুমটি (ghumɑʈi)	kumthî	Sleep
ঢেঁকী (ɖhēkī)	tingkhí	Mortar (leg-operated)
ঢেলা (ɖhēla)	telâ	Pale; cloudy
ধৰণ (dhɑrɑn)	torôn	Method
ধাতু (dhâtu)	tathû	Breath; life; spirit
ধেমালি (dhēmāli)	temalî	Light-hearted; simple
ভনতাৰ (bhɑntār)	pandâr	Granary
ভালুক (bhāluk)	palûk	Bear
ভলুকা বাঁহ (bhɑlukā-bāh)	pulkhû wathí	Bamboo (variety)

4. Assamese shistorical affricates that have become fricatives in Assamese itself turn up as fricative sh in Tiwa.

Assamese	Tiwa	English
চকী (cɑkī)	shûgi	Chair
চলন (cɑlɑn)	shôlon	Behaviour
ছয় (chɑy)	shui	Six
ছেকনী (chēkanī)	sháguni	Conical basket for sifting

5. Assamese শ and স become s, while becomes হ as h in Tiwa.

Assamese	Tiwa	English
শ (s̪o)	so	Hundred
শগুন (s̪ɑgun)	sîgun	Vulture
সকল (sɑkɑl)	sógol	All
সতিনী (sɑtinī)	sûduni	Concubine
হাতী (hātī)	hâdi	Elephant
হুদু (hudu)	hûdu	Owl (variety)

There are some exceptions that apparently go contrary to these patterns. Some of them may be genuine exceptions whose reasons will need to be probed in greater depth, others point to a shallower time-depth of the borrowing.

=== Double borrowing ===
There are a few instances of the same lexeme being borrowed more than once. The different resultant forms vindicate the above analysis. Some examples are

Assamese	Tiwa	English
চিন্তা (cintā)	shînda	Concern
	sînta	Worry
কাম (kām)	kham	Cultural/religious function
	kam	Work
নিয়ম (niyɑm)	nem	Religion
	niyôm	Custom; rule

Such second borrowing also gives rise to voiced stop initials as seen in the following free variations.

Assamese	Tiwa	English
দৰ্জি	turjî/durjî	Tailor
দশ	tos/dos	Ten
দলং	tolông/dolông	Bridge

== Vocabulary ==
=== Numerals ===
Tiwa has a decimal system and counts to 10 with unique words, after which the number words combine to add to the larger number as shown in the chart below.

Numerals in Tiwa language (Tiwa Khûrikha)
Number	In Tiwa language	In English
1	Kisha	One
2	Kining	Two
3	Tham	Three
4	Broi	Four
5	Ba	Five
6	Dok	Six
7	Sin	Seven
8	Shan	Eight
9	Chuku	Nine
10	Chi	Ten
11	Chi sha	Eleven
12	Chi ning	Twelve
13	Chi tham	Thirteen
14	Chi broi	Fourteen
15	Chi ba	Fifteen
16	Chi dok	Sixteen
17	Chi sin	Seventeen
18	Chi shan	Eighteen
19	Chi chuku	Nineteen
20	Ning chi	Twenty
100	Rai sha	One Hundred
200	Ning rai	Two Hundred
300	Tham rai	Three Hundred
4,00	Broi rai	Four Hundred
5,00	Ba rai	Five Hundred
10,00	Sai	One Thousand
10,0000	Rai sai sa	One Lakh

== See also ==
- Tiwa (Lalung)
- Tiwa Autonomous Council (Tiwashong)
- Jonbeel Mela
- Wanshuwa Festival
- Deo Langkhui
- Tiwa musical instrument

== Notes ==
- 1. ^Tiwa-English Dictionary - UV Jose, Associates Editors - Horsing Kholar, Juliana Maslai, Alfred Maslai, Bibiana Maslai, Simon Mithi
- 2. Don Bosco Centre for Indigenous Cultures, Shillong 2014
- 3. The Assamese words in this section are from Hem Chandra Barua's Hem Kosha (The Assamese-English Dictionary) edited and published by Debananda Barua as its seventh edition in 1992.
- 4. Some words that are indicated in the above topic as borrowed into Tiwa from another language (especially the Indo-Aryan Assamese) could as well be a Tiwa word (or an earlier Tibeto-Burman word) that has found its way into that language.
