= Administrative divisions of India =

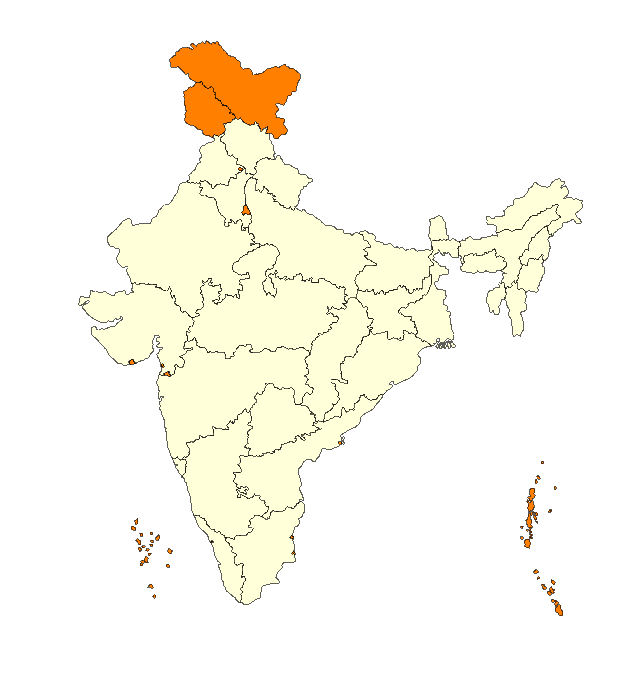
Map of India, states are depicted in yellow, while union territories in orange.

The administrative divisions of India are subnational administrative units of India; they are composed of a nested hierarchy of administrative divisions. India consists of 28 States and 8 Union Territories. These are divided into districts (some states group a set of districts as a division), followed by subdistricts (known in different local names like tehsils and talukas), which are divided into blocks, which consist of villages.

Indian states and territories frequently use different local titles for the same level of subdivision (e.g., the mandals of Andhra Pradesh and Telangana correspond to tehsils of Uttar Pradesh and other Hindi-speaking states but to talukas or taluks of Gujarat, Goa, Karnataka, Kerala, Maharashtra, and Tamil Nadu).

Districts, Subdivisions, tehsils (or taluks) and revenue villages are administrative units used in the land revenue administration of the state. Their jurisdictions may encompass both urban and rural areas. The development blocks exist only in rural areas.

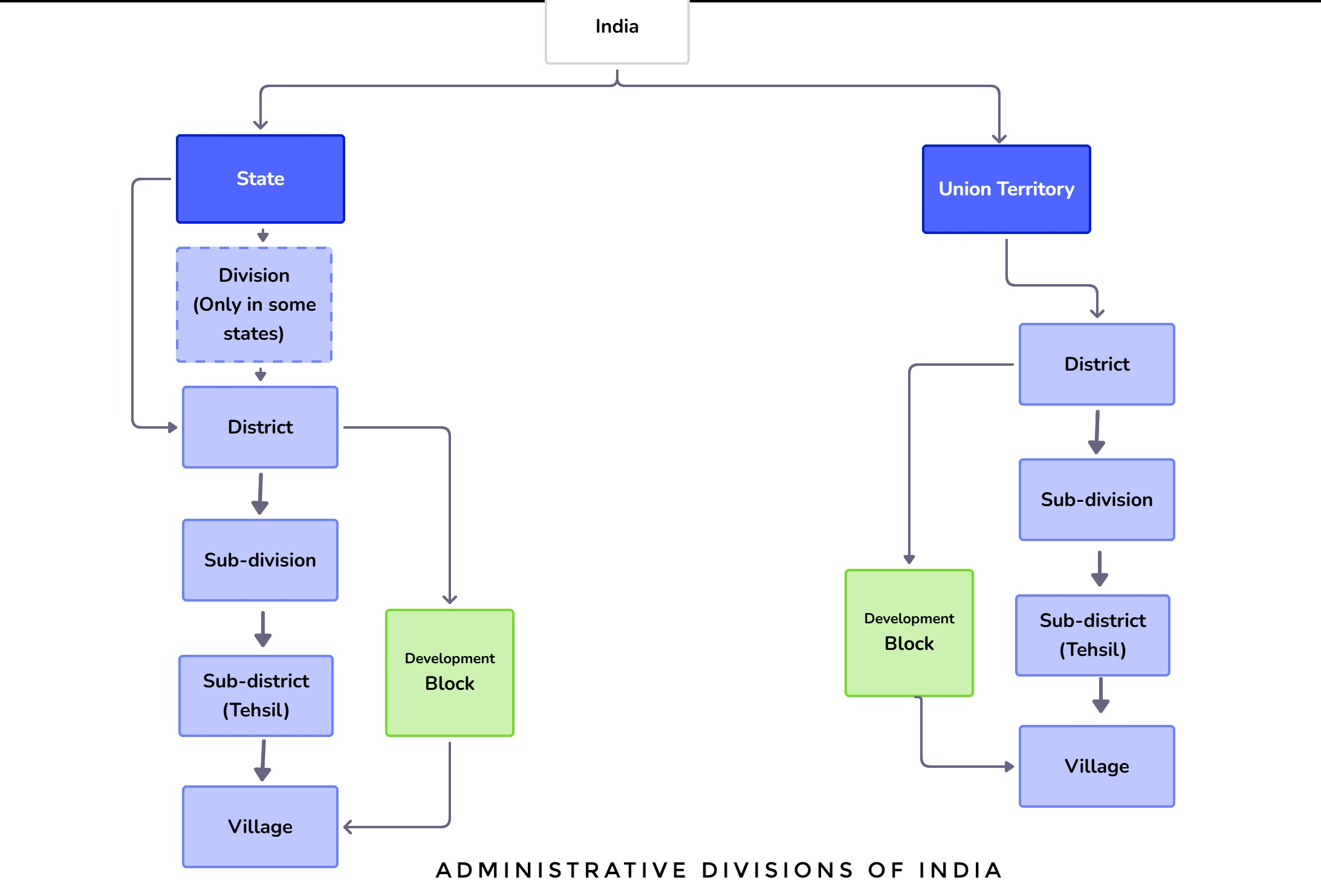
Visual representation of India’s administrative hierarchy from state to village level.

== Tiers of India ==
The diagram below outlines the six tiers of administrative divisions:

Country (India)
State (e.g. West Bengal State)
Division (e.g. Burdwan Division)
District (e.g. Hooghly District)
Sub-division (Revenue Subdivision) (e.g. Arambagh subdivision)
Sub-district (Tehsil/Taluka, Circle, Sub-division) (e.g. Arambagh)
Block (e.g. Goghat I Block)
Village (e.g. Adra village)

Notes:

- Divisions under State: In some states, divisions do not exist, and the administrative units are split directly into districts. In these states, the division concept is either absent or only for administrative purposes.
- Within a district, there are multiple subdivisions such as Subdivisions, Tehsils/Taluks, and Villages, primarily concerned with land revenue administration.
- Separately, the Block, also known as the Community Development Block, is a subdivision of the district used exclusively for rural development purposes. It falls under the Rural Development Department and is not related to revenue administration.
- Nomenclature Differences:
  - The term "Division" is often used as "Revenue Division" or "Region" in some states.
  - In many states, Districts are officially known as Revenue Districts.
  - In some states, a division under a district may be referred to as a Revenue Division, which is equivalent to a sub-division in other states.
  - The terminology for administrative units like Taluk or Tehsil or Sub-district varies widely; for example, Tehsil in Uttar Pradesh is referred to as Taluk in Tamil Nadu, and Circle in some northeastern states and mandal in Andhra Pradesh and Telangana.

=== Tiers of Government ===
The diagram below outlines the three tiers of government : union, state and local government.

Union Government (Government of India)
State Government (e.g. Government of Kerala)
Urban (Urban Local Bodies)	Rural (Panchayati Raj Institutions)
District Panchayat; Zilla Parishad (e.g. Raigad District Council)	Block Panchayat (Panchayat Samiti)	Village Panchayat; Gram Panchayat (e.g. Binodpur Gram Panchayat)

Urban (Urban Local Bodies)
Municipal Corporation (e.g. Municipal Corporation of Delhi)	Municipality (e.g. Darjeeling Municipality)	Town Panchayat (e.g Bhatgaon)

== Sub-national zones ==
=== Administrative zones ===
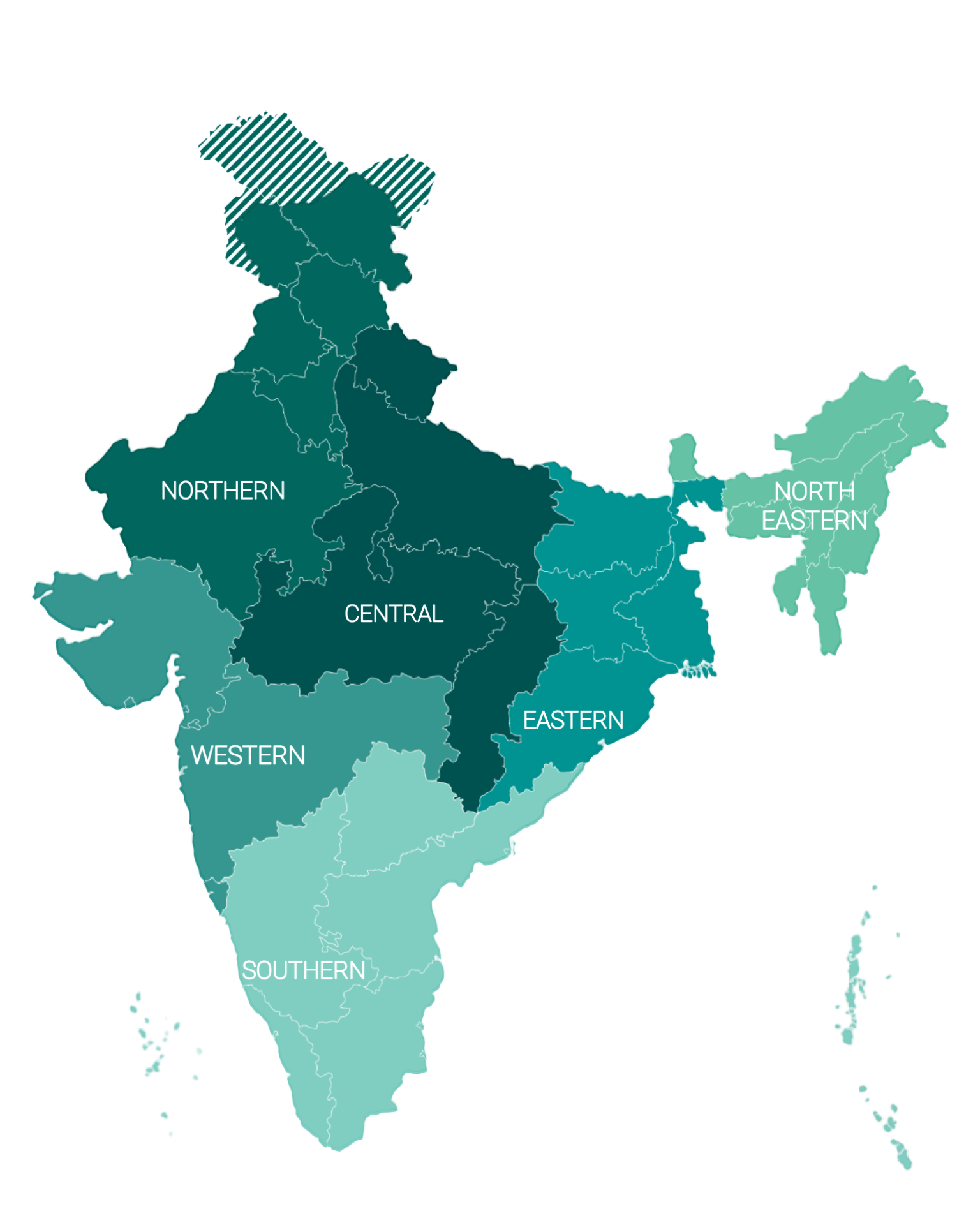
The six zones of India

The states of India have been grouped into six zones having an Advisory Council "to develop the habit of cooperative working" among these States. Zonal Councils were set up vide Part-III of the States Reorganisation Act, 1956. The North Eastern States' special problems are addressed by another statutory body - The North Eastern Council, created by the North Eastern Council Act, 1971. The present composition of each of these Zonal Councils is as under:

- Northern Zonal Council, comprising Chandigarh, Delhi, Haryana, Himachal Pradesh, Jammu and Kashmir, Ladakh, Punjab, and Rajasthan;
- North Eastern Council, comprising Assam, Arunachal Pradesh, Manipur, Meghalaya, Mizoram, Nagaland and Tripura; The State of Sikkim has also been included in the North Eastern Council vide North Eastern Council (Amendment) Act, 2002 notified on 23 December 2002.
- Central Zonal Council, comprising the States of Chhattisgarh, Madhya Pradesh, Uttarakhand and Uttar Pradesh;
- Eastern Zonal Council, comprising Bihar, Jharkhand, Odisha, and West Bengal;
- Western Zonal Council, comprising Dadra and Nagar Haveli and Daman and Diu, Goa, Gujarat, and Maharashtra;
- Southern Zonal Council, comprising Andhra Pradesh, Karnataka, Kerala, Puducherry, Tamil Nadu, and Telangana.
- Andaman and Nicobar Islands and Lakshadweep are not members of any of the Zonal Councils. However, they are presently special invitees to the Southern Zonal Council

=== Cultural zones ===
Each zone has a zonal headquarters where a zonal cultural center has been established. Several states have membership in multiple zones, but no state subdivisions are utilised in the zonal divisions. In addition to promoting the culture of the zones they are responsible for, each zonal center also works to cross-promote and create exposure to other cultural zones of India by organising functions and inviting artistes from other zones.

Location of the headquarters of each cultural zone

Zone	Zonal Centre	Extent
South Culture Zone	South Zone Cultural Centre, Thanjavur, Tamil Nadu	Andaman and Nicobar Islands, Andhra Pradesh, Karnataka, Kerala, Lakshadweep, Puducherry, Tamil Nadu, Telangana
South Central Culture Zone	South-Central Zone Cultural Centre, Nagpur, Maharashtra	Andhra Pradesh, Chhattisgarh, Goa, Karnataka, Madhya Pradesh, Maharashtra, Telangana
North Culture Zone	North Zone Cultural Centre, Patiala, Punjab	Chandigarh, Haryana, Himachal Pradesh, Jammu and Kashmir, Ladakh, Punjab, Rajasthan, Uttarakhand
North Central Culture Zone	North Central Zone Cultural Centre, Prayagraj, Uttar Pradesh	Bihar, Delhi, Haryana, Madhya Pradesh, Rajasthan, Uttar Pradesh, Uttarakhand
East Culture Zone	East Zone Cultural Centre, Kolkata, West Bengal	Andaman and Nicobar Islands, Assam, Bihar, Jharkhand, Manipur, Odisha, Sikkim, Tripura, West Bengal
North East Culture Zone	North East Zone Cultural Centre, Dimapur, Nagaland	Arunachal Pradesh, Assam, Manipur, Meghalaya, Mizoram, Nagaland, Sikkim, Tripura
West Culture Zone	West Zone Cultural Centre, Udaipur, Rajasthan	Dadra and Nagar Haveli and Daman and Diu, Goa, Gujarat, Maharashtra, Rajasthan

== States and union territories within zones ==
India is composed of 28 states and eight union territories (including a national capital territory).

=== States ===
India consists of 28 states and 8 union territories, including the National Capital Territory of Delhi with Rajasthan being largest in land area.

State	ISO	Vehicle code	Zone	Capital	Largest city	Statehood	Population (2011)	Area (km^{2})	Official languages	Additional official languages
Andhra Pradesh	IN-AP	AP	Southern	Amaravati	Visakhapatnam	1 November 1956	49,506,799	162,975	Telugu	Urdu
Arunachal Pradesh	IN-AR	AR	North-Eastern	Itanagar		20 February 1987	1,383,727	83,743	English	—
Assam	IN-AS	AS	North-Eastern	Dispur	Guwahati	26 January 1950	31,205,576	78,438	Assamese, Boro	Bengali, Meitei
Bihar	IN-BR	BR	Eastern	Patna		26 January 1950	104,099,452	94,163	Hindi	Urdu
Chhattisgarh	IN-CG	CG	Central	Raipur (Note: Nava Raipur is planned to replace Raipur as the capital city of Chhattisgarh.)		1 November 2000	25,545,198	135,194	Hindi	Hindi, Chhattisgarhi
Goa	IN-GA	GA	Western	Panaji	Vasco da Gama	30 May 1987	1,458,545	3,702	Konkani	Marathi
Gujarat	IN-GJ	GJ	Western	Gandhinagar	Ahmedabad	1 May 1960	60,439,692	196,024	Gujarati	Hindi
Haryana	IN-HR	HR	Northern	Chandigarh	Faridabad	1 November 1966	25,351,462	44,212	Hindi	Punjabi
Himachal Pradesh	IN-HP	HP	Northern	Shimla (Summer); Dharamshala (Winter)	Shimla	25 January 1971	6,864,602	55,673	Hindi	Sanskrit
Jharkhand	IN-JH	JH	Eastern	Ranchi	Jamshedpur	15 November 2000	32,988,134	79,714	Hindi	Angika, Bengali, Bhojpuri, Bhumij, Ho, Kharia, Khortha, Kurmali, Kurukh, Magahi, Maithili, Mundari, Nagpuri, Odia, Santali, Urdu
Karnataka	IN-KA	KA	Southern	Bengaluru (Summer); Belagavi (Winter)	Bengaluru	1 November 1956	61,095,297	191,791	Kannada	Tulu
Kerala	IN-KL	KL	Southern	Thiruvananthapuram		1 November 1956	33,406,061	38,863	Malayalam	English
Madhya Pradesh	IN-MP	MP	Central	Bhopal	Indore	1 November 1956	72,626,809	308,252	Hindi	—
Maharashtra	IN-MH	MH	Western	Mumbai (Summer); Nagpur (Winter)	Mumbai	1 May 1960	112,374,333	307,713	Marathi	—
Manipur	IN-MN	MN	North-Eastern	Imphal		21 January 1972	2,855,794	22,327	Meitei	English
Meghalaya	IN-ML	ML	North-Eastern	Shillong		21 January 1972	2,966,889	22,429	English, Khasi, Garo	—
Mizoram	IN-MZ	MZ	North-Eastern	Aizawl		20 February 1987	1,097,206	21,081	Mizo, English	—
Nagaland	IN-NL	NL	North-Eastern	Kohima	Dimapur	1 December 1963	1,978,502	16,579	English	—
Odisha	IN-OD	OD	Eastern	Bhubaneswar		26 January 1950	41,974,218	155,707	Odia	—
Punjab	IN-PB	PB	Northern	Chandigarh	Ludhiana	1 November 1966	27,743,338	50,362	Punjabi	—
Rajasthan	IN-RJ	RJ	Northern	Jaipur		26 January 1950	68,548,437	342,239	Hindi	English
Sikkim	IN-SK	SK	North-Eastern	Gangtok		16 May 1975	610,577	7,096	Nepali, Sikkimese, Lepcha, English	Gurung, Limbu, Magar, Mukhia, Newari, Rai, Sherpa, Tamang
Tamil Nadu	IN-TN	TN	Southern	Chennai		1 November 1956	72,147,030	130,058	Tamil	English
Telangana	IN-TS	TG	Southern	Hyderabad (Note: Andhra Pradesh was divided into two states, Telangana and a residual Andhra Pradesh on 2 June 2014. Hyderabad, located entirely within the borders of Telangana, is to serve as the capital for both states for a period of time not exceeding ten years. The Government of Andhra Pradesh and the Andhra Pradesh Legislature completed the process of relocating to temporary facilities in the envisaged new capital city Amaravati in early 2017.)		2 June 2014	35,193,978	112,077	Telugu	Urdu
Tripura	IN-TR	TR	North-Eastern	Agartala		21 January 1972	3,673,917	10,491	Bengali, English, Kokborok	—
Uttar Pradesh	IN-UP	UP	Central	Lucknow		26 January 1950	199,812,341	240,928	Hindi	Urdu
Uttarakhand	IN-UK	UK	Central	Bhararisain (Summer); Dehradun (Winter)	Dehradun	9 November 2000	10,086,292	53,483	Hindi	Sanskrit
West Bengal	IN-WB	WB	Eastern	Kolkata		26 January 1950	91,276,115	88,752	Bengali, English	Nepali, (Note: Bengali and Nepali are the official languages in the Darjeeling and Kurseong sub-divisions of the Darjeeling district.) Hindi, Odia, Punjabi, Santali, Telugu, Urdu, Kamatapuri, Rajbanshi, Kurmali, Kurukh (Note: Hindi, Odia, Punjabi, Santali, Urdu, Kamatapuri, Rajbanshi, Kurmali and Kurukh are treated as additional official languages in blocks, divisions or districts where the speakers exceed 10% of the population.)
Total							1,178,310,321	3,054,066		

=== Union territories ===
State	ISO	Vehicle code	Zone	Capital	Largest city	Established	Population (2011)	Area (km^{2})	Official languages	Additional official languages
Andaman and Nicobar Islands	IN-AN	AN	Southern	Port Blair		1 November 1956	380,581	8,249	Hindi, English	—
Chandigarh	IN-CH	CH	Northern	Chandigarh		1 November 1966	1,055,450	114	Hindi, English	—
Dadra and Nagar Haveli and Daman and Diu	IN-DH	DD	Western	Daman	Silvassa	26 January 2020	587,106	603	Hindi, English	Gujarati
Delhi	IN-DL	DL	Northern	New Delhi	Delhi	1 November 1956	16,787,941	1,484	Hindi, English	Urdu, Punjabi
Jammu and Kashmir	IN-JK	JK	Northern	Srinagar (Summer); Jammu (Winter)	Srinagar	31 October 2019	12,258,433	42,241	Dogri, English, Hindi, Kashmiri, Urdu	—
Ladakh	IN-LA	LA	Northern	Leh (Summer); Kargil (Winter)	Leh	31 October 2019	290,492	59,146	Hindi, English	—
Lakshadweep	IN-LD	LD	Southern	Kavaratti		1 November 1956	64,473	32	English	Malayalam
Puducherry	IN-PY	PY	Southern	Pondicherry		16 August 1962	1,247,953	479	Tamil, Telugu, Malayalam	English, French
Total							32,672,429	112,348		

== Divisions within states and UT ==
Divisions exist within the respective states and union territories, and are of two types, namely the "Administrative Divisions" (directly under the control of the state government) and the "Autonomous Administrative Divisions" (relatively with the higher degree of autonomy governed by the directly elected council).

=== Autonomous administrative divisions ===
Autonomous councils in India

The Sixth Schedule of the Constitution of India allows for the formation of autonomous administrative divisions which have been given autonomy within their respective states and union territories.

Presently, 10 Autonomous Councils in Assam, Meghalaya, Mizoram and Tripura are formed by virtue of the Sixth Schedule with the rest being formed as a result of other legislation.

There are 10 Autonomous District Councils created by the Sixth Schedule of the Constitution of India:

State	Body	Headquarters	Formation	Last Election	Ruling Party
Assam	Bodoland	Kokrajhar	2003	2025	BPF
Assam	Dima Hasao	Haflong	1952	2024	BJP
Assam	Karbi Anglong	Diphu	1952	2022	BJP
Meghalaya	Garo Hills	Tura	1973	Vacant	
Meghalaya	Jaintia Hills	Jowai	1973	2025	NPP
Meghalaya	Khasi Hills	Shillong	1973	2025	VPP
Mizoram	Chakma	Kamalanagar	1972	2023	BJP
Mizoram	Lai	Lawngtlai	1972	2025	MNF
Mizoram	Mara	Siaha	1972	2022	BJP
Tripura	Tripura Tribal Areas	Khumulwng	1982	2026	TMP

Some states have created autonomous councils by an Act of their state legislatures.

State	Body	Headquarters	Formation	Last Election	Ruling Party
Assam	Tiwa	Morigaon	1995	2020	BJP
Assam	Mising	Dhemaji	1995	2019	SGS
Assam	Rabha Hasong	Dudhnoi	1995	2025	RHJM
Assam	Sonowal Kachari	Dibrugarh	2005	2019	BJP
Assam	Thengal Kachari	Titabar	2005	2022	BJP
Assam	Deori	Narayanpur	2005	2022	BJP
Assam	Moran	Tinsukia	2020		
Assam	Matak	Chring Gaon	2020		
Assam	Bodo Kachari	Simen Chapori	2020		
Assam	Kamtapur	Abhayapuri	2020		
Manipur	Chandel Autonomous District Council	Chandel	1971	2015	NPF
Manipur	Churachandpur Autonomous District Council	Churachandpur	1971	2015	Ind
Manipur	Sadar Hills Autonomous District Council	Kangpokpi	1971	2015	INC
Manipur	Manipur North Autonomous District Council	Senapati	1971	2015	NPF
Manipur	Tamenglong Autonomous District Council	Tamenglong	1971	2015	NPF
Manipur	Ukhrul Autonomous District Council	Ukhrul	1971	2015	NPF
Mizoram	Sinlung Hills Council	Aizawl	2018	2024	MNF
Ladakh	LAHDC, Kargil	Kargil	2003	2023	
Ladakh	LAHDC, Leh	Leh	1995	2020	
Ladakh	LAHDC, Nubra	Diskit	2026		
Ladakh	LAHDC, Zanskar	Padum	2026		
Ladakh	LAHDC, Changthang	Nyoma	2026		
Ladakh	LAHDC, Sham	Khalatse	2026		
Ladakh	LAHDC, Drass	Drass	2026		
Ladakh	LAHDC, Sankoo	Sankoo	2026		
West Bengal	Gorkhaland Territorial Administration	Darjeeling	2012	2022	BGPM

=== Administrative divisions ===
Many of the Indian states are subdivided into divisions, which have official administrative governmental status, and each division is headed by a senior IAS officer called Divisional Commissioner.

States like Kerala, Tamil Nadu, Goa, etc. don't have separate divisions or regions. Instead, they're directly split into districts for administrative purposes.

As of September 2022, divisions exist in 18 of the 28 states and 3 of the 8 union territories. As of September 2022, there are a total of 102 divisions in India.

No. of divisions in each state or UT
State/Union territory	No. of divisions	Population 2011 Census	Average population per division
States
Andhra Pradesh	-	49,386,799	-
Arunachal Pradesh	3	1,383,727	461,242
Assam	5	31,169,272	6,233,854
Bihar	9	104,099,452	11,566,606
Chhattisgarh	5	25,545,198	5,109,040
Goa	-	1,458,545	-
Gujarat	-	60,439,692	-
Haryana	6	25,351,462	4,225,244
Himachal Pradesh	3	6,864,602	2,288,201
Jharkhand	5	32,988,134	6,597,627
Karnataka	4	61,095,297	15,273,824
Kerala	-	33,406,061	-
Madhya Pradesh	10	72,626,809	7,262,681
Maharashtra	6	112,374,333	18,729,056
Manipur	-	2,721,756	-
Meghalaya	3	2,966,889	1,483,445
Mizoram	-	1,097,206	-
Nagaland	1	1,978,502	1,978,502
Odisha	3	41,974,218	13,991,406
Punjab	5	27,743,338	5,548,668
Rajasthan	7	68,548,437	6,854,844
Sikkim	-	610,577	-
Tamil Nadu	-	72,147,030	-
Telangana	-	35,193,978	-
Tripura	-	3,673,917	-
Uttar Pradesh	18	199,812,341	11,100,686
Uttarakhand	2	10,086,292	5,043,146
West Bengal	5	91,276,115	18,255,223
Union Territories
Andaman and Nicobar Islands	-	380,581	-
Chandigarh	-	1,055,450	-
Dadra and Nagar Haveli and Daman and Diu	-	586,956	-
Jammu and Kashmir	2	12,258,433	6,129,217
Ladakh	1	290,492	290,492
Lakshadweep	-	64,473	-
Delhi	1	16,787,941	16,787,941
Puducherry	-	1,247,953	-
Total	104	1,210,854,977	11,755,874

=== Regions within states ===
Some states consist of regions, which have no official administrative governmental status. They are purely geographic regions; some correspond to historic countries, states or provinces. A region may comprise one or more divisions, averaging about three divisions per region. However, the boundaries of the regions and the boundaries of the divisions do not always coincide exactly. So far there has been no movement to give the regions official administrative status. If this was to be done, it would presumably require that the boundaries of the regions be slightly modified so that they correspond exactly with their constituent districts.

- Regions of Assam (4)
  - Assam Proper region, Goalpara region, Kamrup region and Barak Valley region
- Regions of Gujarat (4)
  - North Gujarat, Central Gujarat, South Gujarat, and Saurashtra
- Regions of Kerala (3)
  - North Kerala, Central Kerala, and South Kerala
- Regions of Maharashtra (5)
  - Western Maharashtra (Desh), Vidarbha, Marathwada, North Maharashtra, and Konkan

== Districts ==
States and union territories of India are subdivided into districts (zilla), numbering 797 as of November 2023. A district, formally designated a revenue district, serves as the primary administrative unit of a state or union territory.

Each district is headed by a civil servant, usually from the Indian Administrative Service, known variously as the District Collector, District Magistrate, or Deputy Commissioner, depending on the state. The office combines land revenue administration with magisterial and general executive responsibilities. Although created as a revenue unit, district boundaries are widely adopted by other departments—such as police, education, health, and rural development—for administrative efficiency, making the district a multipurpose jurisdiction.

Police administration within a district is under the Superintendent of Police (SP), typically an officer of the Indian Police Service. Police districts are generally coterminous with revenue districts, though in some states a single revenue district may contain more than one police district, or a police district may cover only a subdivision of a revenue district. A forest division is different from a revenue district. Its boundaries vary from state to state and may encompass multiple revenue districts or only a portion of one. Management of forests and wildlife resources within the forest division rests with the Divisional Forest Officer (DFO), an officer of the Indian Forest Service.

Sectoral development functions are carried out by district-level officers of various line departments of the state government, including Public Works, Health, Education, Agriculture, Animal Husbandry, Social Justice, Urban Development, Panchayati Raj, and Rural Development. These officials usually belong to the respective state civil services.

Overview of districts; population figures according to 2011 census
Administrative division	Districts	Total population	Population per district
States
Andhra Pradesh	28	49,577,103	1,770,611
Arunachal Pradesh	27	1,383,727	49,419
Assam	35	31,205,576	891,588
Bihar	38	104,099,452	2,739,459
Chhattisgarh	33	25,545,198	774,097
Goa	3	1,458,545	486,182
Gujarat	34	60,439,692	1,777,638
Haryana	23	25,351,462	1,102,237
Himachal Pradesh	12	6,864,602	572,050
Jharkhand	24	32,988,134	1,374,506
Karnataka	31	61,095,297	1,970,816
Kerala	14	33,406,061	2,386,147
Madhya Pradesh	55	72,626,809	1,274,155
Maharashtra	36	112,374,333	3,121,509
Manipur	16	2,570,390	160,649
Meghalaya	12	2,966,889	247,241
Mizoram	11	1,097,206	99,746
Nagaland	17	1,978,502	116,382
Odisha	30	41,974,218	1,399,141
Punjab	23	27,743,338	1,206,232
Rajasthan	41	68,548,437	1,671,913
Sikkim	6	610,577	101,763
Tamil Nadu	38	72,147,030	1,898,606
Telangana	33	35,003,674	1,060,717
Tripura	8	3,673,917	459,240
Uttar Pradesh	75	199,812,341	2,629,110
Uttarakhand	13	10,086,292	775,869
West Bengal	27	91,276,115	3,380,597
Union Territories
Andaman and Nicobar Islands	3	380,581	126,860
Chandigarh	1	1,055,450	1,055,450
Dadra Nagar Haveli, Daman and Diu	3	586,956	195,652
Jammu and Kashmir	20	12,258,093	612,905
Ladakh	8	290,492	41,499
Lakshadweep	1	64,473	64,473
Delhi	13	16,787,941	1,291,380
Puducherry	4	1,247,953	311,988
Total	800	1,210,576,856	1,552,022

Largest and smallest districts in India
	Largest District	Smallest District
By Land Area	Kutch district	Mahe district
By Population	North 24 Parganas district	Dibang Valley district

=== Subdivisions ===
A sub-division is an administrative division of a district in India. In some states (Andhra Pradesh, Telangana, Tamil Nadu, Kerala) they are called Revenue Divisions. It is headed by a sub-divisional magistrate (also known as assistant collector or assistant commissioner). In some states, the post is designated as Revenue Divisional Officer (RDO) or Sub-Divisional Officer (Civil).

Subdivisions, also known as revenue divisions in some states, are designed primarily for land revenue administration and related purposes. These subdivisions serve as an intermediate tier between the district and the tehsil/taluk/subdistrict levels, encompassing multiple of these smaller administrative units. Their core functions revolve around the management of land records, the collection of land taxes, and the implementation of land-related policies, facilitating efficient governance and resource management at the local level.

A district may have multiple sub-divisions, and each of those sub-divisions may contain multiple sub-districts (tehsils/C.D. Blocks) and municipalities. For example, in West Bengal, the Murshidabad district contains five sub-divisions (mahakumas)

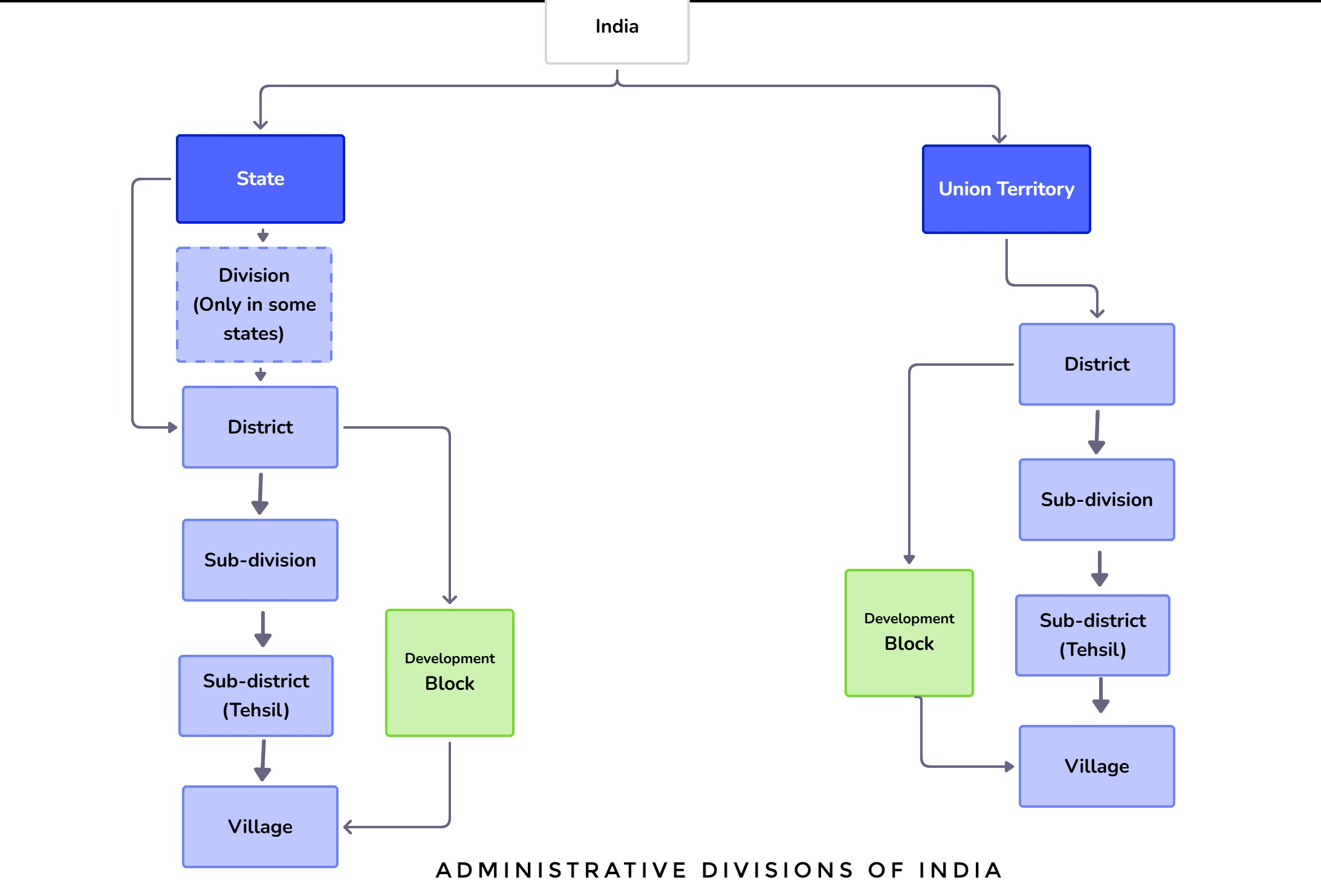
Visual representation of India's administrative hierarchy from state to village level.

=== Subdistricts ===
A tehsil (also known as taluk, taluka, or mandal) is a sub-district unit in India, functioning mainly for land and revenue administration. It is headed by a tehsildar, who oversees land records, revenue collection, and related functions.

In some cases, tehsils overlap with community development blocks. Tehsils fall under the revenue department, while blocks come under the rural development department and are headed by a Block Development Officer (BDO), serving different administrative purposes over similar areas.

The following is the list of tehsil,or its equivalent administrative units in India:

State/ Union territory	Sub-district	No. of Subdistricts
Andaman and Nicobar Islands (Union Territory)		9
Andhra Pradesh	Mandal	686
Arunachal Pradesh		209
Assam		160
Bihar	Tehsil	537
Chandigarh		1
Chhattisgarh		251
Dadra and Nagar Haveli and Daman and Diu (Union Territory)		3
Delhi (Union Territory)		33
Goa		12
Gujarat		284
Haryana	Tehsil	143
Himachal Pradesh		190
Jammu and Kashmir (Union Territory)	Tehsil	208
Jharkhand		264
Karnataka	Taluka	240
Kerala	Taluk	78
Ladakh		15
Lakshadweep		10
Madhya Pradesh	Tehsil	440
Maharashtra		358
Manipur		65
Meghalaya		56
Mizoram		28
Nagaland		120
Odisha		537
Puducherry		8
Punjab		97
Rajasthan		426
Sikkim		18
Tamil Nadu	Taluk	316
Telangana		594
Tripura		23
Uttar Pradesh	Tehsil	350
Uttarakhand		129
West Bengal		346
Total		7,244

Source: Local Government Directory, Ministry of Panchayati Raj, Government of India. Figures are from the report accessed on 16 October 2026.

Each tehsil is divided into revenue circles or directly into revenue villages. A revenue circle, headed by a circle officer or revenue inspector, oversees revenue collection and land records, and consists of multiple revenue villages, the lowest unit in the land revenue system.

=== Development Blocks ===
Each district is divided into Blocks, also known as Community Development Blocks (CD Block), purely for the purpose of rural development administration. Each Block comprises several rural subdivisions (Panchayats) and is headed by a Block Development Officer (BDO), who is an officer of the state civil service.

== Local government ==
=== Urban level ===
List of towns in India by population

==== Urban agglomerations ====
Urban agglomerations are two or more separate administrative cities contiguous to each other, some of which may or may not have the formal recognition in the form of a legal body to manage the agglomerations, the examples of such legal bodies are Delhi NCR.

==== Metropolitan area ====
Reserve Bank of India (RBI) classifies the cities in India from Tier-I (largest) to Tier-IV (smallest) for the administrative efficiency, economic assessment, urban planning and infrastructure, investment considerations, business environment, and purchasing power of cities based on the criteria entailing the population, economic Development (GDP, etc), infrastructure, educational Institutions and healthcare Facilities, and administrative Importance. Tier-I and tier-II also called the metropolitan cities. The examples of Tier-I metropolitan cities of are: Delhi, Mumbai, Kolkata, Chennai, Bangalore, Hyderabad, Ahmedabad and Pune. Example of Tier-II city are Faridabad and Gurugram in Delhi NCR, Chandigarh, Jaipur, Surat, Raipur, etc; Tier-III cities are Hisar, Bhiwani, and Tier-IV is Hansi.

==== Statutory towns ====
All areas under statutory urban administrative units like Municipal Corporation, Municipal council, Cantonment Board, Notified Town Area Committee, Town Panchayat, etc., are known as Statutory Towns.

==== Census towns ====
Census towns are areas in India that have urban characteristics but are not defined as towns by state governments. They are governed by rural local bodies like gram panchayats, unlike statutory towns.

=== Rural level ===
==== Blocks ====
The Community Development Block also known as CD Block or just block, is often the next level of administrative division (for development purposes, whereas tehsil is next to the district for revenue purposes).

Blocks are district sub-divisions primarily for the purpose of Rural Development departments and Panchayati Raj institutions. Cities have similar arrangements under the Urban Development department. Tehsils (also called Taluks) are common across urban and rural areas for the administration of land and revenue departments, primarily to track land ownership and levy land tax.

The following table lists the number of Development Blocks across the States and Union Territories of India. The administrative data is as of 1 February 2024:

State/ Union territory	No. of Blocks
Andaman and Nicobar Islands	9
Andhra Pradesh	668
Arunachal Pradesh	129
Assam	230
Bihar	534
Chandigarh	1
Chhattisgarh	145
Delhi	0
Goa	12
Gujarat	250
Haryana	143
Himachal Pradesh	88
Jammu and Kashmir	287
Jharkhand	264
Karnataka	235
Kerala	152
Ladakh	31
Lakshadweep	10
Madhya Pradesh	313
Maharashtra	352
Manipur	70
Meghalaya	54
Mizoram	28
Nagaland	74
Odisha	314
Puducherry	6
Punjab	153
Rajasthan	362
Sikkim	33
Tamil Nadu	388
Telangana	594
Dadra and Nagar Haveli and Daman and Diu	3
Tripura	58
Uttar Pradesh	826
Uttarakhand	95
West Bengal	345
Total	7256

==== Villages ====
Villages are often the lowest level of subdivisions in India. The governmental bodies at the village level are called Gram Panchayat, of which there were an estimated 256,000 in 2002. Each Gram Panchayat covers a large village or a cluster of smaller villages with a combined population exceeding 500 Gram Sabha. Clusters of villages are also sometimes called Hobli or Patti.

==== Habitations ====
Certain governmental functions and activities - including clean water availability, rural development, and education - are tracked at a sub-village level. These hamlets are termed "habitations". India is composed of 1,714,556 habitations In some states, most villages have a single habitation; in others (notably Kerala and Tripura) there is a high ratio of habitations to villages.

== Others ==
Climatic zones of India.

Vegetation zones of India.

=== India ===
- Akhand Bharat
- Greater India
- Indosphere
- Mandala (political model)
- Names of India

=== India outside India ===
- Indian Antarctica
- Overseas military bases of India
- Little India (disambiguation)

=== Historical administrative divisions ===
Listed from higher to lower:

- Historic India
  - Meluhha
- Province or state level
  - Subah,
- Division level
  - Chakla, a large division, often comprising several Parganas, and sometimes serving as a replacement or intermediate unit between a Sarkar and Pargana, particularly in regions like Bengal and Awadh.
- District level
  - Sarkar or Taraf
- Sub-district
  - Pargana or Mahal
- Village level
  - Mauza or Gram

=== Present day habitation terms ===
- Chak, village in Punjab Canal Colonies
- Dhani, hamlet

=== Land forms ===
Sometimes unofficial and sometimes official classification by the land form:

  - Bagar tract
  - Barani, Nehri and Nalli
  - Doab
  - Khadir and Bangar

== See also ==
- Regions of Asia
