= States and union territories of India =

- Category: Federated states
- Location: Republic of India
- Number: 28 States; 8 Union territories
- Populations: States: Sikkim – 610,577 (lowest); Uttar Pradesh – 199,812,341 (highest); Union Territories: Lakshadweep – 64,473 (lowest); Delhi – 16,787,941 (highest)
- Areas: States: Goa – 3,702 km^{2} (1,429 sq mi) (smallest); Rajasthan – 342,269 km^{2} (132,151 sq mi) (largest); Union territories: Lakshadweep – 32 km^{2} (12 sq mi) (smallest); Ladakh – 59,146 km^{2} (22,836 sq mi) (largest)
- Government: State Governments Union Government (union territories)
- Subdivisions: Divisions Districts

India is a federal union comprising 28 states and 8 union territories, for a total of 36 subnational entities. The states and union territories in turn are each subdivided into districts, of which a total of around 800 exist. Districts contain further levels of administrative subdivisions.

Under the Indian Constitution and laws, the states of India are self-governing administrative divisions, each having a state government. The legal power to manage affairs in each state is shared or divided between the particular state government on one hand and the national union government on the other. The union territories are directly governed by the union government; no state level government (and thus no division of power) exists in these jurisdictions. (Note: A few union territories have their own representative territorial governments.)

== History ==
=== 1876–1919 ===
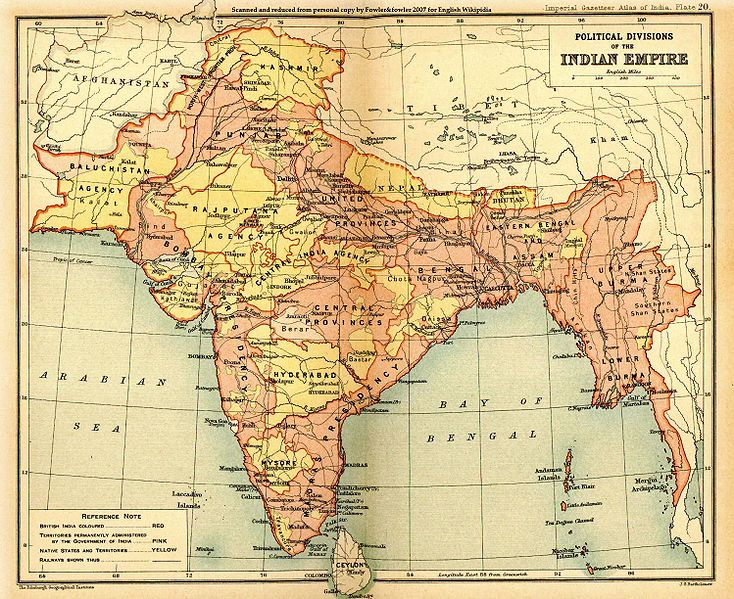
The administrative divisions of the Indian Empire in 1909

The British Raj was a very complex political entity consisting of various imperial divisions and states and territories of varying autonomy. At the time of its legal establishment in 1876, it was made up of 584 constituent states and the directly ruled territories of the Crown. The entire empire was divided into provinces and agencies.

A province consisted of territory under the direct rule of the Emperor of India (who was also the King of the United Kingdom and the Dominions) and a few minor states, ruled by Indian princes under the suzerainty of the Emperor. A Governor or Lieutenant-Governor acted as representative of the Emperor in that province and as head of government of the directly ruled territories in the province.

The governor or lieutenant-governor also served as the Emperor's representative to the constituent states of the province. The first three of the lieutenant-governorships were territories annexed to India from other powers and temporarily governed by the erstwhile Bengal Presidency, before being made into their own separate provinces. Agra and Bengal were still considered de jure parts of the defunct Bengal Presidency for judicial and legal purposes. Agra was separated in 1878 and merged with Oudh.

The Bengal Presidency was re-established in 1912 as a governorship. All these provinces had their own legislatures established by the Indian Councils Acts, and high courts established by Indian High Courts Acts. Laws passed by these legislatures needed the dual assent of the governor or lieutenant-governor of the province and the governor-general of India, who functioned as the representative of the Emperor.

- There were three governor's provinces in 1912, styled "Presidencies" as a historical memento that they had been once governed by presidents. These were:
  - Bombay
  - Madras (officially Presidency of Fort St. George)
  - Bengal (from 1912)
- There were six lieutenant-governor's provinces in 1905. These were:
  - Burma
  - Punjab
  - Central Provinces
  - Bengal (till 1912)
  - Eastern Bengal and Assam (1905–1912)
  - Agra and Oudh
    - North-Western Provinces and Oudh (1878–1902)
    - United Provinces of Agra and Oudh (1902–1935)

There were territories ruled directly by the Government of India through nominated chief commissioners. These were former independent states annexed to India and since ruled directly by the Supreme Government.

- There were the three chief commissioner's provinces. These did not have a legislature or a high court. These were:
  - Ajmer-Merwara
  - Coorg
  - Oudh (till 1878)
  - Delhi (from 1911, capital of India)

The vast majority of the Indian states in the late nineteenth century were, in terms of imperial divisions, organised within the provinces. A good number of states were organised into imperial structures called agencies, or residencies. An Agent to the Governor-General (AGG) functioned as the Emperor's representative to all the states in the agency.

- At the time of establishment of the empire, there were only two agencies:
  - Rajputana
  - Central India
- Several kingdoms were neither part of a province nor an agency; they each had direct relations with the Emperor:
  - Kashmir and Jammu
  - Nizamate of Hyderabad
  - Kingdom of Mysore

=== 1919–1935 ===
In 1919, the fourth Government of India was enacted by the Crown. This saw many major changes. The legislatures of the provinces were made elected ones rather than nominated ones. Some provinces were given bicameral legislatures. All provinces were elevated to governorships and all lieutenant governors were made governors. Burma was given a special status and made an autonomous province.

- The ten governor's provinces during this period:
  - Bombay
  - Madras
  - Bengal
  - Burma
  - Punjab
  - Central Provinces and Berar
  - United Provinces
  - North-West Frontier Province
  - Assam
  - Bihar and Orissa
- Four chief commissioner's provinces (Their status mostly remained unchanged):
  - Ajmer-Merwara
  - Coorg
  - Balochistan
  - Delhi

The Chamber of Princes was established by Emperor George V in 1920. One of the major consequences of this was the creation of many more agencies from the states of the provinces, granting them direct relations with the Emperor instead of with the Governors.

- There were now 8 imperial agencies and residencies. These were:
  - Punjab States (formerly part of Punjab Province)
  - Madras States (formerly part of Madras Presidency)
  - Deccan States Agency and Kolhapur Residency (formerly part of Bombay Presidency)
  - Western India and Gujarat States Agency and Baroda Residency (formerly part of Bombay Presidency)
  - Eastern States (formerly part of Bengal Presidency, Bihar and Orissa Province and Central Provinces)
  - Gwalior Residency (formerly part of Central India Agency)
  - Rajputana
  - Central India

This saw the separation of all the states from the provinces and addition to before-mentioned agencies. This left all the provinces with only territories under direct Crown rule.

- Several states continued their direct relations with the Emperor through this period, including:
  - Kashmir and Jammu
  - Nizamate of Hyderabad
  - Kingdom of Mysore

=== 1935–1947 ===
The latter years of the Indian Empire saw the enactment of the last Government of India Act by the Crown. This act granted full autonomy to Indian provinces. Provincial laws no longer needed the assent of the governor-general. This act created the office of a Premier in each province, who functioned as the new head of government and was responsible to the provincial legislature.

Bengal, Madras and Bombay which had been till now styled Presidencies, were now officially styled as provinces. The provinces of Orissa and Sind were created from Bihar and Bombay respectively. The Province of Burma which had previously functioned as an autonomous province of India was now separated from the Indian Empire, and established as the Crown Colony of Burma.

- The new set of 12 governor's provinces were:
  - Bombay
  - Sind
  - Madras
  - Bengal
  - Burma
  - Punjab
  - Central Provinces and Berar
  - United Provinces
  - North-West Frontier Province
  - Assam
  - Bihar
  - Orissa
- There were 4 chief commissioner's provinces:
  - Ajmer-Merwara
  - Coorg
  - Balochistan
  - Delhi
- There were 8 imperial agencies and residencies:
  - Punjab States
  - Madras States
  - Deccan States Agency and Kolhapur Residency
  - Western India and Gujarat States Agency and Baroda Residency
  - Eastern States
  - Gwalior Residency
  - Rajputana
  - Central India
- Three kingdoms were in direct relations with the Emperor.

In 1947, the last Act of the Crown was passed. The act dissolved the Indian Empire, the Imperial Legislative Council and the Chamber of Princes. The Union of India was consequently established from 9 former Indian provinces (East Punjab, United Provinces, Central Provinces, Madras, Bombay, Bihar, Orissa, West Bengal and Assam) and 562 former Indian states.

=== 1947–1950 ===
The administrative divisions of the Union of India in 1950.

Between 1947 and 1950, the territories of the princely states were politically integrated into the new Indian Union. Most were merged into existing provinces. Others were organised into new provinces and states, such as Rajasthan, Himachal Pradesh, Malwa Union, Baghelkhand and Bundelkhand States Union, and Patiala and East Punjab States Union, made up of multiple princely states. A few, including Mysore, Hyderabad, Bhopal, and Bilaspur, became separate states.

The new Constitution of India, which came into force on 26 January 1950, made India a sovereign democratic republic. The new republic was also declared to be a "Union of States". The constitution of 1950 distinguished between three main types of states:

- Part A states, which were the former governors' provinces of India, were ruled by an elected governor and state legislature. The nine Part A states were:
  - Assam (formerly Assam Province),
  - Bihar (formerly Bihar Province),
  - Bombay (formerly Bombay Province),
  - East Punjab (formerly Punjab Province),
  - Madhya Pradesh (formerly the Central Provinces and Berar),
  - Madras (formerly Madras Province),
  - Orissa (formerly Orissa Province),
  - Uttar Pradesh (formerly the United Provinces), and
  - West Bengal (formerly Bengal Province).
- The eight Part B states were former princely states or groups of princely states, governed by a rajpramukh, who was usually the ruler of a constituent state, and an elected legislature. The rajpramukh was appointed by the President of India. The Part B states were:
  - Hyderabad (formerly Hyderabad Princely State),
  - Jammu and Kashmir (formerly Jammu and Kashmir Princely State),
  - Madhya Bharat (formerly Central India Agency),
  - Mysore (formerly Mysore Princely State),
  - Patiala and East Punjab States Union (PEPSU),
  - Rajasthan (formerly Rajputana Agency),
  - Saurashtra (formerly Baroda, Western India and Gujarat States Agency), and
  - Travancore–Cochin (formerly Travancore Princely State and Cochin Princely State).
- The ten Part C states included both the former chief commissioners' provinces and some princely states, and each was governed by a chief commissioner appointed by the President of India. The Part C states were:
  - Ajmer (formerly Ajmer-Merwara Province),
  - Bhopal (formerly Bhopal Princely State),
  - Bilaspur (formerly Bilaspur Princely State),
  - Coorg State (formerly Coorg Province),
  - Delhi,
  - Himachal Pradesh,
  - Kutch (formerly Cutch Princely State),
  - Manipur (formerly Manipur Princely State),
  - Tripura (formerly Tripura Princely State), and
  - Vindhya Pradesh (formerly Central India Agency).
- The only Part D state was the Andaman and Nicobar Islands, which were administered by a lieutenant governor appointed by the union government.

=== States reorganisation (1951–1956) ===
India before the States Reorganisation Act, 1956.

India after the States Reorganisation Act

Andhra State was created on 1 October 1953 from the Telugu-speaking northern districts of Madras State and Bellary district bifurcated between Mysore and Andhra.

The French enclave of Chandernagore was transferred to West Bengal in 1954. In the same year Pondicherry, comprising the former French enclaves of Pondichéry, Karikal, Yanaon and Mahé, was transferred to India. This became a union territory in 1962.

Also in 1954, pro-India forces liberated the Portuguese-held enclaves of Dadrá and Nagar Aveli, declaring the short-lived de facto state of Free Dadra and Nagar Haveli. In 1961, India annexed it as the Union Territory of Dadra and Nagar Haveli.

The States Reorganisation Act, 1956 reorganised the states based on linguistic lines resulting in the creation of the new states.

As a result of this act:

- Madras State retained its name, with Kanyakumari district added to it from Travancore–Cochin.
- Andhra Pradesh was created with the merger of Andhra State with the Telugu-speaking districts of Hyderabad State in 1956.
- Kerala was created by merging Malabar district and the Kasaragod taluk of South Canara districts of Madras State with Travancore–Cochin.
- Mysore State was re-organised with the addition of the district of South Canara (excluding Kasaragod taluk) and the Kollegal taluk of Coimbatore district from the Madras State, the districts of Belgaum, Bijapur, North Canara and Dharwad from Bombay State, the Kannada-majority districts of Bidar, Raichur and Kalaburagi from Hyderabad State and the Coorg State.
- The Laccadive Islands, Aminidivi Islands and Minicoy Island, which had been divided between the South Canara and Malabar districts of Madras State, were united and organised into the union territory of Lakshadweep.
- Bombay State was enlarged by the addition of Saurashtra State and Kutch State, the Marathi-speaking districts of Nagpur division of Madhya Pradesh and the Marathwada region of Hyderabad State.
- Rajasthan gained territories from Ajmer State and Punjab from Patiala and East Punjab States Union, and certain territories of Bihar were transferred to West Bengal.

=== Post-1956 ===
Bombay State was split into the linguistic states of Gujarat and Maharashtra on 1 May 1960 by the Bombay Reorganisation Act. The former Union Territory of Nagaland achieved statehood on 1 December 1963. The Punjab Reorganisation Act, 1966 resulted in the creation of Haryana on 1 November and the transfer of the northern districts of Punjab to Himachal Pradesh. The act designated Chandigarh as a union territory and the shared capital of Punjab and Haryana.

Madras State was renamed Tamil Nadu in 1969. The north-eastern states of Manipur, Meghalaya and Tripura were formed on 21 January 1972. Mysore State was renamed Karnataka in 1973. On 16 May 1975, Sikkim became the 22nd state of the Indian Union and the state's monarchy was abolished. In 1987, Arunachal Pradesh and Mizoram became states on 20 February, followed by Goa on 30 May, while erstwhile union territory of Goa, Daman and Diu's northern exclaves Damão and Diu became a separate union territory as Daman and Diu.

In November 2000, three new states were created, namely:

- Chhattisgarh, from eastern Madhya Pradesh, (Madhya Pradesh Reorganisation Act, 2000)
- Uttaranchal, from northwest Uttar Pradesh (renamed Uttarakhand in 2007), (Uttar Pradesh Reorganisation Act, 2000), and
- Jharkhand, from southern districts of Bihar (Bihar Reorganisation Act, 2000).

Pondicherry was renamed Puducherry in 2007 and Orissa was renamed Odisha in 2011. Telangana was created on 2 June 2014 from ten former districts of north-western Andhra Pradesh.

In August 2019, the Parliament of India passed the Jammu and Kashmir Reorganisation Act, 2019, which contains provisions to reorganise the state of Jammu and Kashmir into two union territories; Jammu and Kashmir and Ladakh, effective from 31 October 2019. Later that year in November, the Government of India introduced legislation to merge the union territories of Daman and Diu and Dadra and Nagar Haveli into a single union territory to be known as Dadra and Nagar Haveli and Daman and Diu, effective from 26 January 2020. On 25 August 2026, Kerala was officially renamed Keralam.

== States and union territories ==
=== States ===
India consists of 28 states and 8 union territories, including the National Capital Territory of Delhi with Rajasthan being largest in land area.

| State | ISO | Vehicle code | Zone | Capital(s) | Largest city | Statehood | Population (2011) | Area (km^{2}) | Official languages | Additional official languages |
|---|---|---|---|---|---|---|---|---|---|---|
| Andhra Pradesh | IN-AP | AP | Southern | Amaravati | Visakhapatnam | 1 November 1956 | 49,506,799 | 162,975 | Telugu | Urdu |
| Arunachal Pradesh | IN-AR | AR | North-Eastern | Itanagar | | 20 February 1987 | 1,383,727 | 83,743 | English | — |
| Assam | IN-AS | AS | North-Eastern | Dispur | Guwahati | 26 January 1950 | 31,205,576 | 78,438 | Assamese, Boro | Bengali, Meitei |
| Bihar | IN-BR | BR | Eastern | Patna | | 26 January 1950 | 104,099,452 | 94,163 | Hindi | Urdu |
| Chhattisgarh | IN-CG | CG | Central | Raipur (Note: Nava Raipur is planned to replace Raipur as the capital city of Chhattisgarh.) | | 1 November 2000 | 25,545,198 | 135,194 | Hindi | Hindi, Chhattisgarhi |
| Goa | IN-GA | GA | Western | Panaji | Vasco da Gama | 30 May 1987 | 1,458,545 | 3,702 | Konkani | Marathi |
| Gujarat | IN-GJ | GJ | Western | Gandhinagar | Ahmedabad | 1 May 1960 | 60,439,692 | 196,024 | Gujarati | Hindi |
| Haryana | IN-HR | HR | Northern | Chandigarh | Faridabad | 1 November 1966 | 25,351,462 | 44,212 | Hindi | Punjabi |
| Himachal Pradesh | IN-HP | HP | Northern | Shimla (Summer) Dharamshala (Winter) | Shimla | 25 January 1971 | 6,864,602 | 55,673 | Hindi | Sanskrit |
| Jharkhand | IN-JH | JH | Eastern | Ranchi | Jamshedpur | 15 November 2000 | 32,988,134 | 79,714 | Hindi | Angika, Bengali, Bhojpuri, Bhumij, Ho, Kharia, Khortha, Kurmali, Kurukh, Magahi, Maithili, Mundari, Nagpuri, Odia, Santali, Urdu |
| Karnataka | IN-KA | KA | Southern | Bengaluru (Summer) Belagavi (Winter) | Bengaluru | 1 November 1956 | 61,095,297 | 191,791 | Kannada | Tulu |
| Kerala | IN-KL | KL | Southern | Thiruvananthapuram | | 1 November 1956 | 33,406,061 | 38,863 | Malayalam | English |
| Madhya Pradesh | IN-MP | MP | Central | Bhopal | Indore | 1 November 1956 | 72,626,809 | 308,252 | Hindi | — |
| Maharashtra | IN-MH | MH | Western | Mumbai (Summer) Nagpur (Winter) | Mumbai | 1 May 1960 | 112,374,333 | 307,713 | Marathi | — |
| Manipur | IN-MN | MN | North-Eastern | Imphal | | 21 January 1972 | 2,855,794 | 22,327 | Meitei | English |
| Meghalaya | IN-ML | ML | North-Eastern | Shillong | | 21 January 1972 | 2,966,889 | 22,429 | English, Khasi, Garo | — |
| Mizoram | IN-MZ | MZ | North-Eastern | Aizawl | | 20 February 1987 | 1,097,206 | 21,081 | Mizo, English | — |
| Nagaland | IN-NL | NL | North-Eastern | Kohima | Dimapur | 1 December 1963 | 1,978,502 | 16,579 | English | — |
| Odisha | IN-OD | OD | Eastern | Bhubaneswar | | 26 January 1950 | 41,974,218 | 155,707 | Odia | — |
| Punjab | IN-PB | PB | Northern | Chandigarh | Ludhiana | 1 November 1966 | 27,743,338 | 50,362 | Punjabi | — |
| Rajasthan | IN-RJ | RJ | Northern | Jaipur | | 26 January 1950 | 68,548,437 | 342,239 | Hindi | English |
| Sikkim | IN-SK | SK | North-Eastern | Gangtok | | 16 May 1975 | 610,577 | 7,096 | Nepali, Sikkimese, Lepcha, English | Gurung, Limbu, Magar, Mukhia, Newari, Rai, Sherpa, Tamang |
| Tamil Nadu | IN-TN | TN | Southern | Chennai | | 1 November 1956 | 72,147,030 | 130,058 | Tamil | English |
| Telangana | IN-TS | TG | Southern | Hyderabad (Note: Andhra Pradesh was divided into two states, Telangana and a residual Andhra Pradesh on 2 June 2014. Hyderabad, located entirely within the borders of Telangana, is to serve as the capital for both states for a period of time not exceeding ten years. The Government of Andhra Pradesh and the Andhra Pradesh Legislature completed the process of relocating to temporary facilities in the envisaged new capital city Amaravati in early 2017.) | | 2 June 2014 | 35,193,978 | 112,077 | Telugu | Urdu |
| Tripura | IN-TR | TR | North-Eastern | Agartala | | 21 January 1972 | 3,673,917 | 10,491 | Bengali, English, Kokborok | — |
| Uttar Pradesh | IN-UP | UP | Central | Lucknow | | 26 January 1950 | 199,812,341 | 240,928 | Hindi | Urdu |
| Uttarakhand | IN-UK | UK | Central | Bhararisain (Summer) Dehradun (Winter) | Dehradun | 9 November 2000 | 10,086,292 | 53,483 | Hindi | Sanskrit |
| West Bengal | IN-WB | WB | Eastern | Kolkata | | 26 January 1950 | 91,276,115 | 88,752 | Bengali, English | Nepali, (Note: Bengali and Nepali are the official languages in the Darjeeling and Kurseong sub-divisions of the Darjeeling district.) Hindi, Odia, Punjabi, Santali, Telugu, Urdu, Kamatapuri, Rajbanshi, Kurmali, Kurukh (Note: Hindi, Odia, Punjabi, Santali, Urdu, Kamatapuri, Rajbanshi, Kurmali and Kurukh are treated as additional official languages in blocks, divisions or districts where the speakers exceed 10% of the population.) |
| Total | | | | | | | 1,178,310,321 | 3,054,066 | | |

=== Union territories ===
| State | ISO | Vehicle code | Zone | Capital | Largest city | Established | Population (2011) | Area (km^{2}) | Official languages | Additional official languages |
|---|---|---|---|---|---|---|---|---|---|---|
| Andaman and Nicobar Islands | IN-AN | AN | Southern | Port Blair | | 1 November 1956 | 380,581 | 8,249 | Hindi, English | — |
| Chandigarh | IN-CH | CH | Northern | Chandigarh | | 1 November 1966 | 1,055,450 | 114 | Hindi, English | — |
| Dadra and Nagar Haveli and Daman and Diu | IN-DH | DD | Western | Daman | Silvassa | 26 January 2020 | 587,106 | 603 | Hindi, English | Gujarati |
| Delhi | IN-DL | DL | Northern | New Delhi | Delhi | 1 November 1956 | 16,787,941 | 1,484 | Hindi, English | Urdu, Punjabi |
| Jammu and Kashmir | IN-JK | JK | Northern | Srinagar (Summer); Jammu (Winter) | Srinagar | 31 October 2019 | 12,258,433 | 42,241 | Dogri, English, Hindi, Kashmiri, Urdu | — |
| Ladakh | IN-LA | LA | Northern | Leh (Summer); Kargil (Winter) | Leh | 31 October 2019 | 290,492 | 59,146 | Hindi, English | — |
| Lakshadweep | IN-LD | LD | Southern | Kavaratti | | 1 November 1956 | 64,473 | 32 | English | Malayalam |
| Puducherry | IN-PY | PY | Southern | Pondicherry | | 16 August 1962 | 1,247,953 | 479 | Tamil, Telugu, Malayalam | English, French |
| Total | | | | | | | 32,672,429 | 112,348 | | |

== Former states and union territories ==
=== Former states ===
| Map | State | Capital | Years | Present-day state(s) |
|---|---|---|---|---|
| | Ajmer State | Ajmer | 1950–1956 | Rajasthan |
| | Andhra State | Kurnool | 1953–1956 | Andhra Pradesh |
| | Bhopal State | Bhopal | 1949–1956 | Madhya Pradesh |
| | Bilaspur State | Bilaspur | 1950–1954 | Himachal Pradesh |
| | Bombay State | Bombay | 1950–1960 | Maharashtra, Gujarat, and partially Karnataka |
| | Coorg State | Madikeri | 1950–1956 | Karnataka |
| | East Punjab | Shimla (1947–1953); Chandigarh (1953–1966) | 1947–1966 | Punjab, Haryana, Himachal Pradesh and Chandigarh UT |
| | Hyderabad State | Hyderabad | 1948–1956 | Telangana, and partially Maharashtra, Karnataka, Andhra Pradesh (Note: Region around the Polavaram Project) |
| | Jammu and Kashmir | Srinagar (Summer); Jammu (Winter) | 1947–2019 | Jammu and Kashmir UT and Ladakh UT |
| | Kutch State | Bhuj | 1948–1956 | Gujarat |
| | Madhya Bharat | Indore (Summer); Gwalior (Winter) | 1948–1956 | Madhya Pradesh |
| | Madras State | Madras | 1950–1969 | Andhra Pradesh, Tamil Nadu, and partially Karnataka, Kerala and Telangana (Note: Bhadrachalam and few other areas.) |
| | Mysore State | Bangalore | 1950–1973 | Karnataka |
| | Patiala and East Punjab States Union | Patiala | 1948–1956 | Punjab and Haryana |
| | Saurashtra | Rajkot | 1948–1956 | Gujarat |
| | Travancore–Cochin | Trivandrum | 1949–1956 | Kerala and partially Tamil Nadu |
| | Vindhya Pradesh | Rewa | 1948–1956 | Madhya Pradesh |

=== Former union territories ===
Former union territories of India
| Name | Zone | Capital | Area | Begin | End | Successor(s) | Map |
|---|---|---|---|---|---|---|---|
| Arunachal Pradesh | North-Eastern | Itanagar | 83,743 km^{2} (32,333 sq mi) | 21 January 1972 | 20 February 1987 | As an Indian state | |
| Dadra and Nagar Haveli | Western | Silvassa | 491 km^{2} (190 sq mi) | 11 August 1961 | 26 January 2020 | Dadra and Nagar Haveli and Daman and Diu (UT) | |
| Daman and Diu | Western | Daman | 112 km^{2} (43 sq mi) | 30 May 1987 | 26 January 2020 | Dadra and Nagar Haveli and Daman and Diu (UT) | |
| Goa, Daman and Diu | Western | Panaji | 3,814 km^{2} (1,473 sq mi) | 19 December 1961 | 30 May 1987 | Goa (state), Daman and Diu (UT) | |
| Himachal Pradesh | Northern | Shimla | 55,673 km^{2} (21,495 sq mi) | 1 November 1956 | 25 January 1971 | As an Indian state | |
| Manipur | North-Eastern | Imphal | 22,327 km^{2} (8,621 sq mi) | 1 November 1956 | 21 January 1972 | As an Indian state | |
| Mizoram | North-Eastern | Aizawl | 21,081 km^{2} (8,139 sq mi) | 21 January 1972 | 20 February 1987 | As an Indian state | |
| Tripura | North-Eastern | Agartala | 10,491 km^{2} (4,051 sq mi) | 1 November 1956 | 21 January 1972 | As an Indian state | |

== Responsibilities and authorities ==
The Constitution of India distributes the sovereign executive and legislative powers exercisable with respect to the territory of any state between the Union Government and that state's own State Government.

== See also ==
- Administrative divisions of India
- Autonomous administrative divisions of India
- List of adjectives and demonyms for states and territories of India
- List of Indian state and union territory name etymologies
- List of princely states of British India (alphabetical)
- List of states and union territories of India by population
- List of states in India by past population
- List of states of India by wildlife population
- Proposed states and union territories of India
