= Central India =

Group of centrally located Indian states

Central India Madhya Bharat
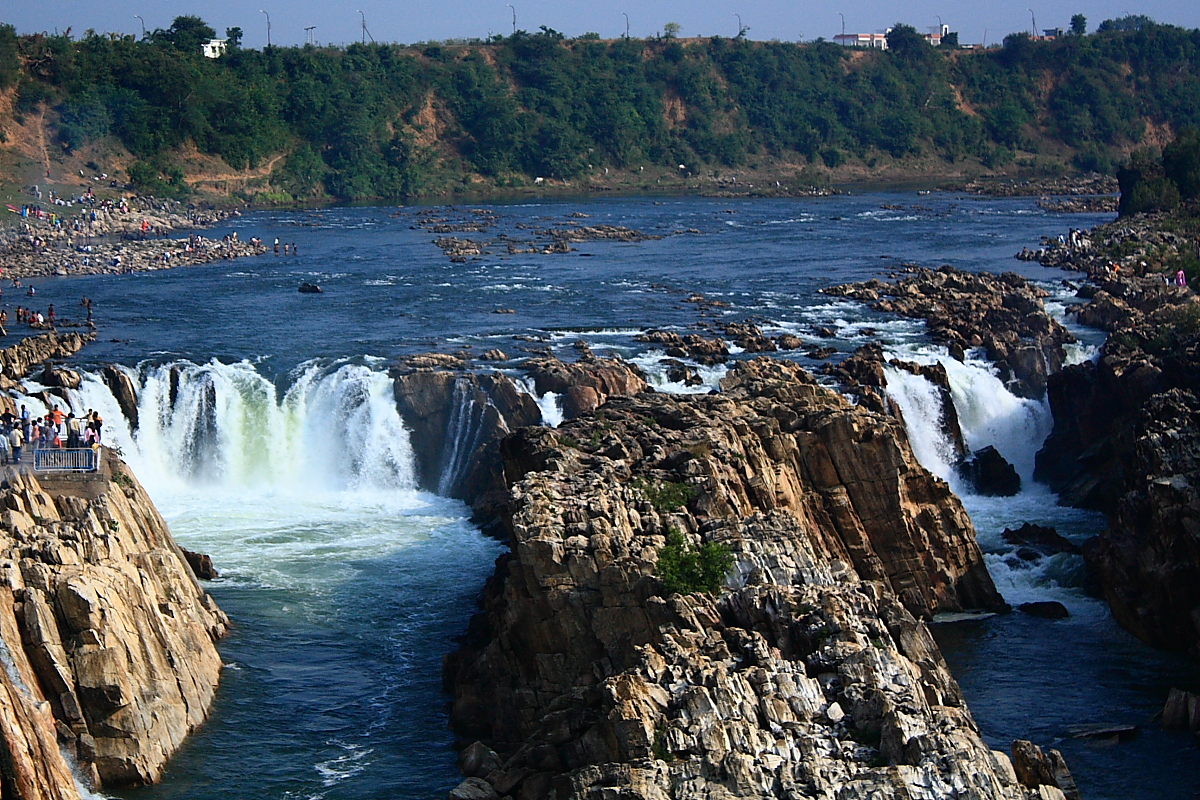
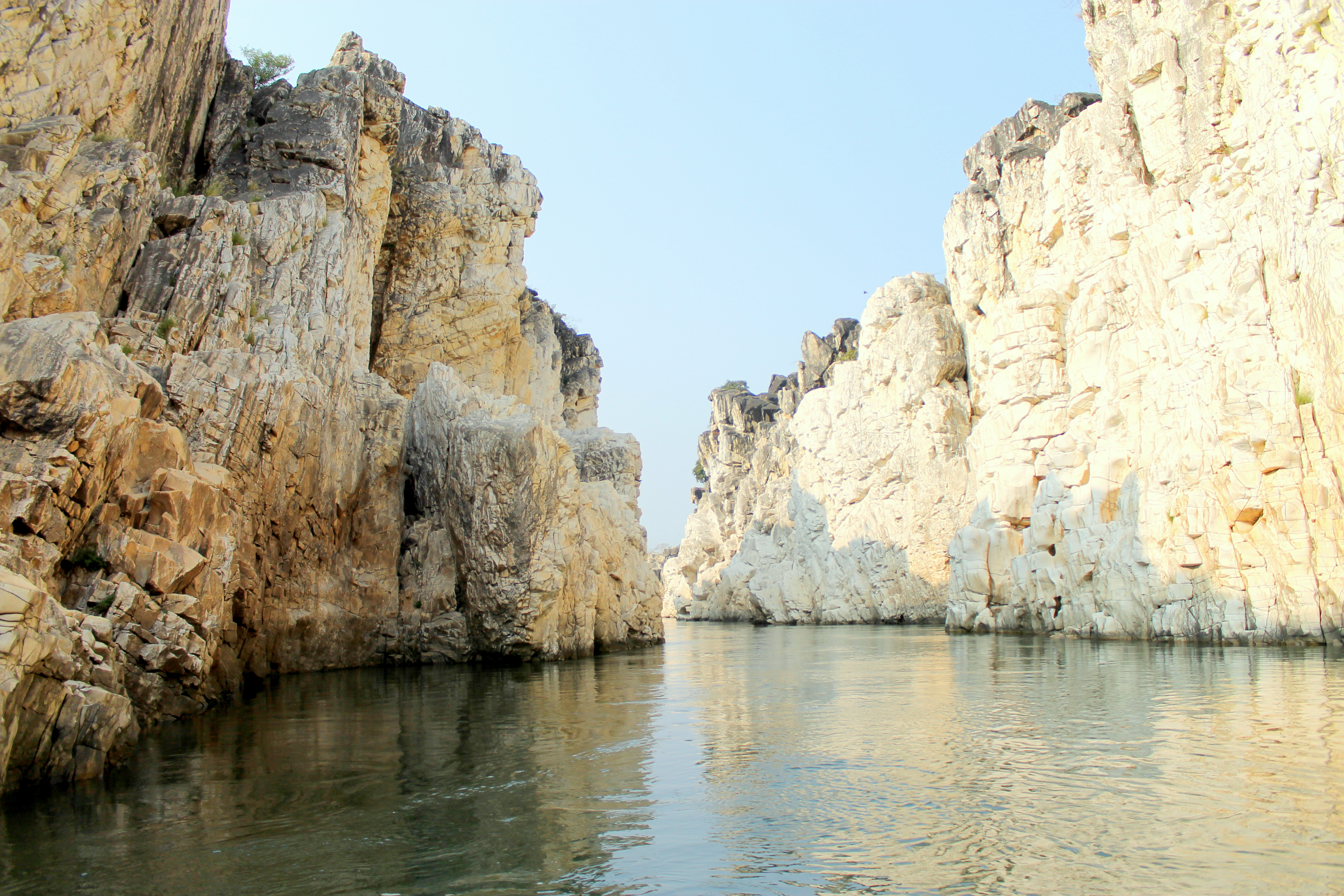
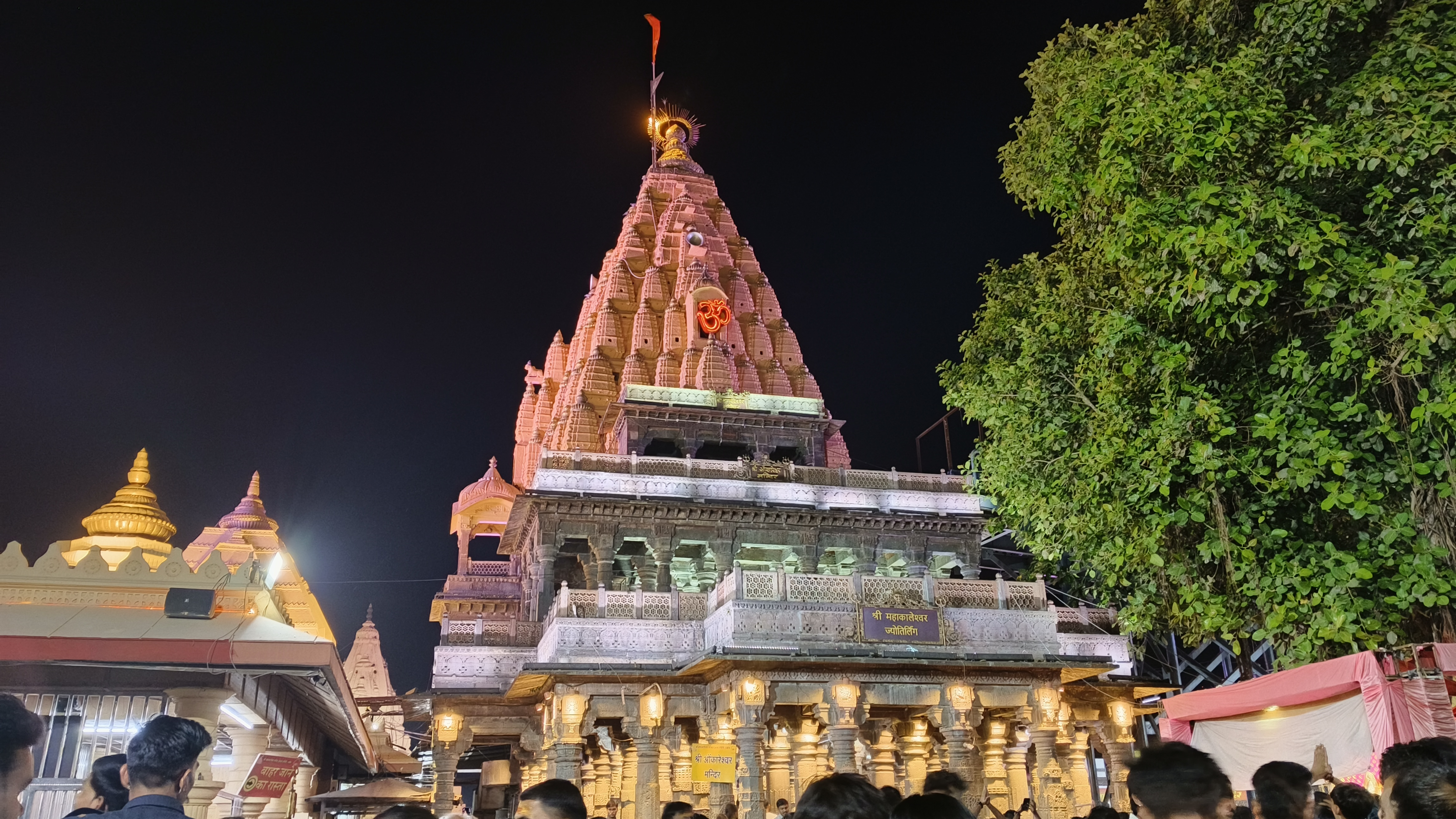
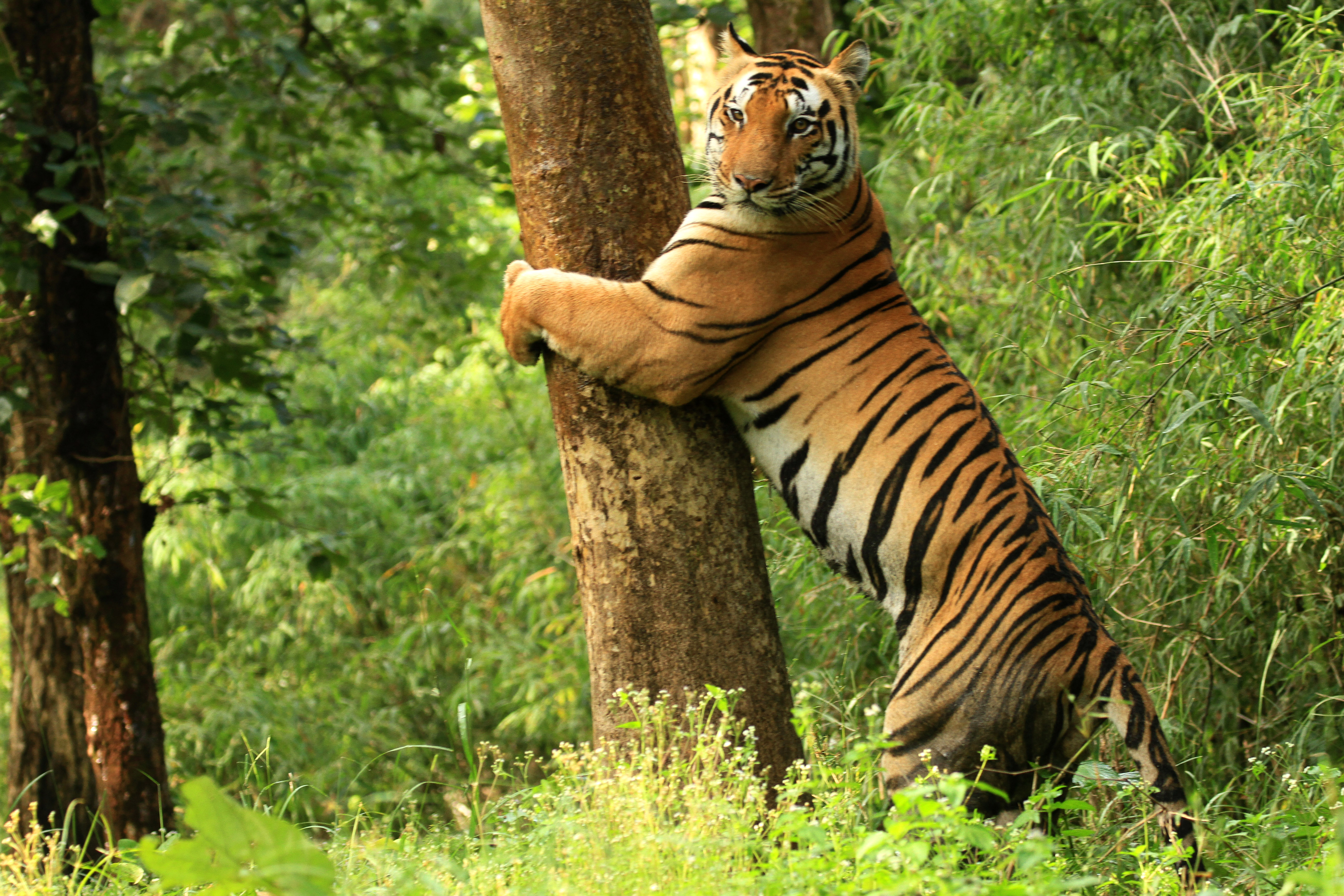
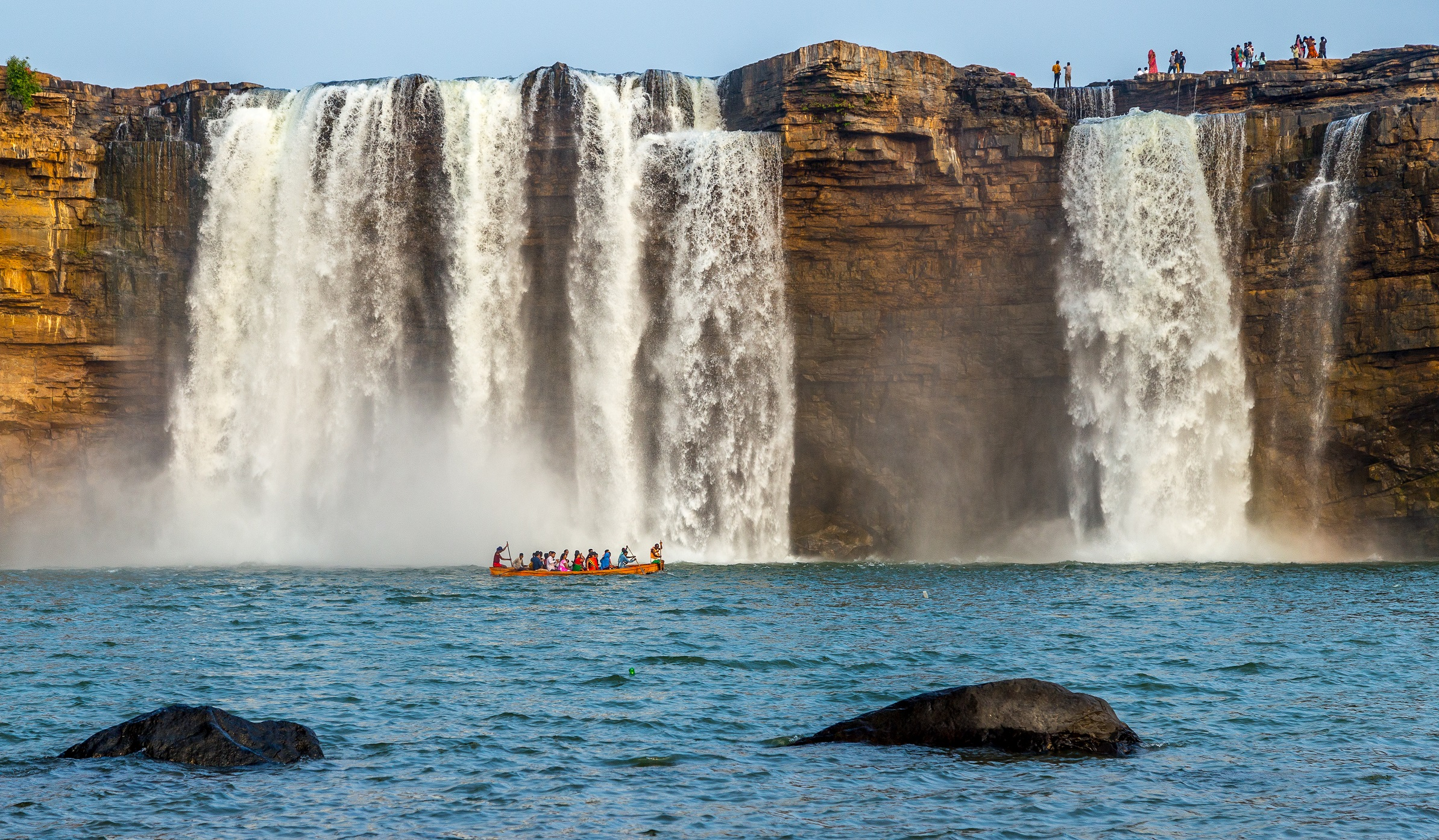
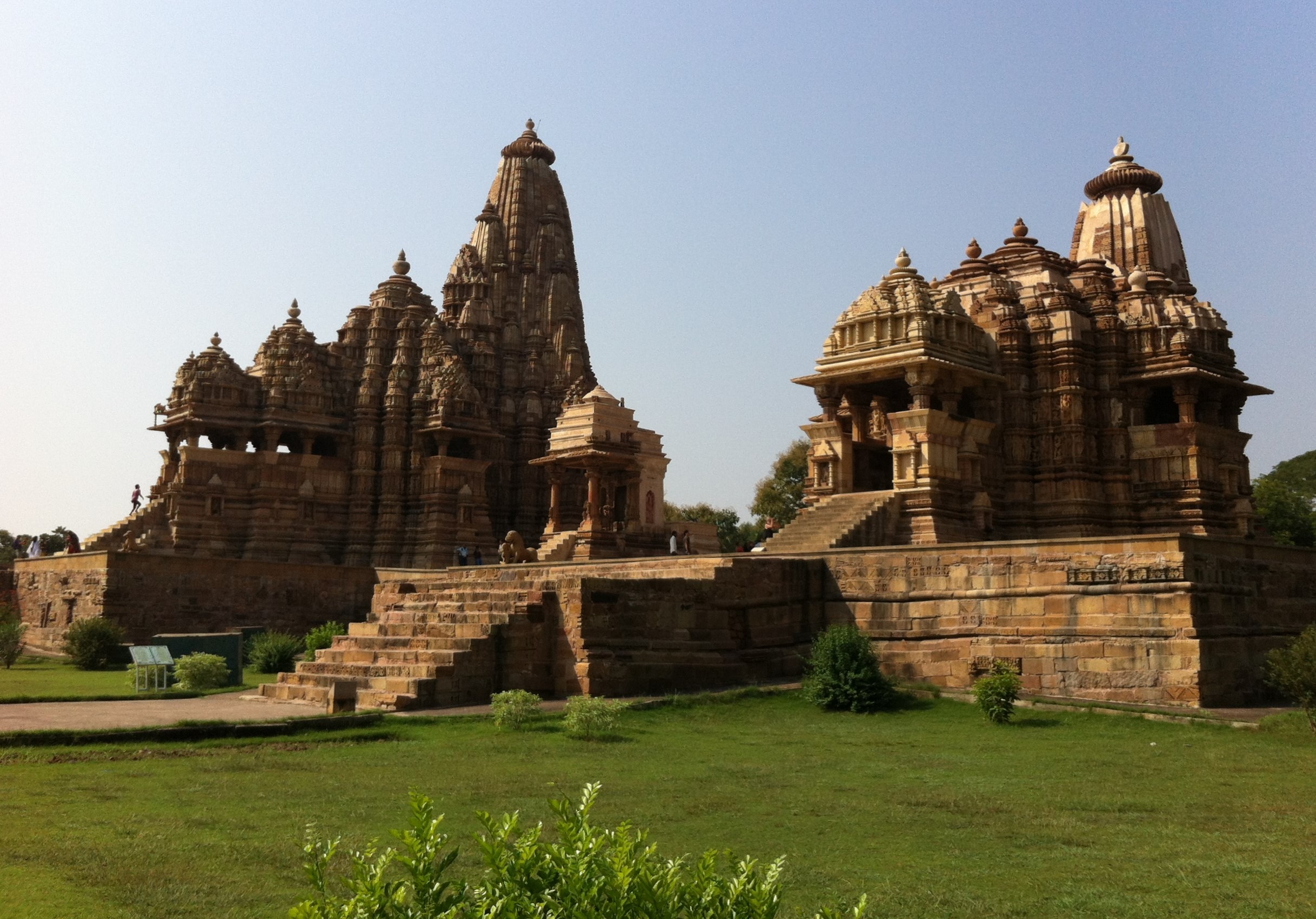
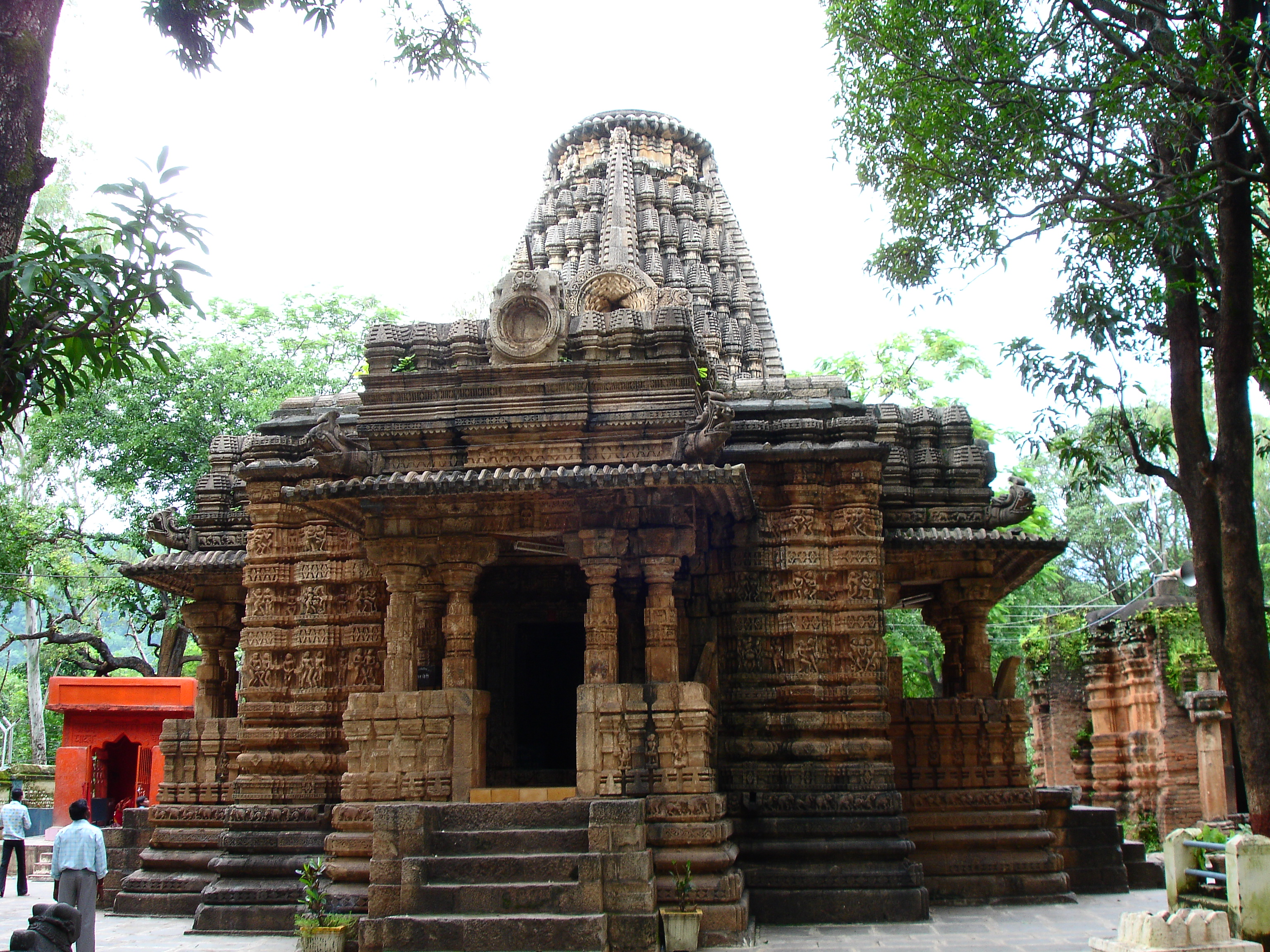
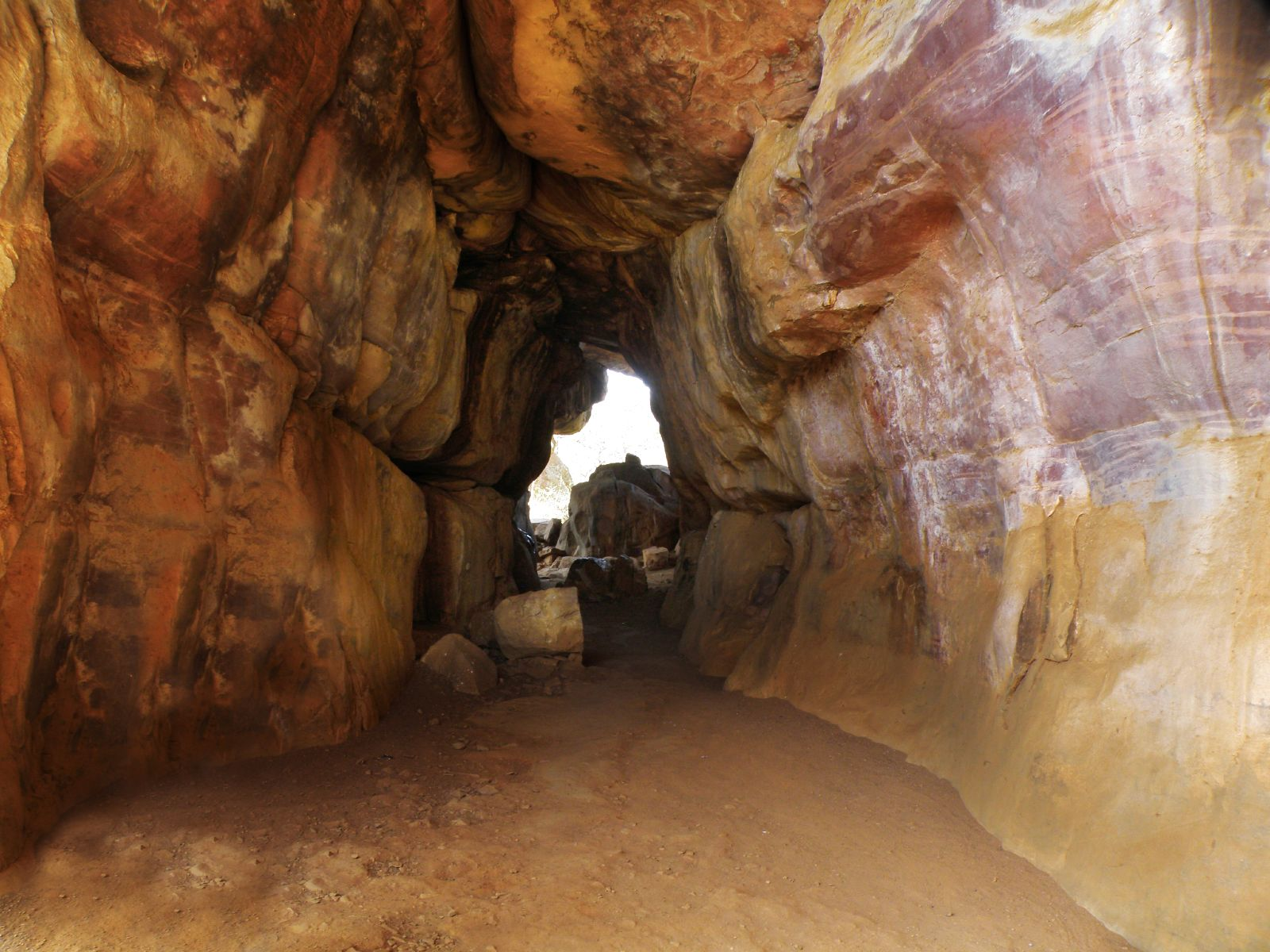
- From top, left to right: Dhuandhar Falls, Marble Rocks along Narmada River, Mahakaleshwar Jyotirlinga Temple, Kanha National Park, Chitrakote Falls, Khajuraho Group of Monuments, Bhoramdeo Temple, Bhimbetka Rock Shelters

- States commonly referred to as Central India
- Country: India
- States: Madhya Pradesh; Chhattisgarh
- Largest cities: Bhopal; Indore; Gwalior; Jabalpur; Raipur; Bilaspur; Durg-Bhilai; Ujjain; Korba; Sagar; Ambikapur

Population (2011)
  - Total: 98,137,763

Central India refers to a geographical region of India that generally includes the states of Chhattisgarh and Madhya Pradesh.

The Central Zonal Council, established by the Government of India, includes these states as well as Uttar Pradesh and Uttarakhand to the north. The inclusion of Uttarakhand extends the region to the Himalayan border with Tibet/China.

States under Central Zonal Council of India in green

== Other definitions ==
Another approach, historically more usual, is to base "Central India" on a north-south axis, making it the part of India that is south of North India and north of South India; the definition of North India also varies hugely, but that of South India is generally agreed. This definition includes either some or all of the Deccan, in particular Maharashtra, and may or may not include some of the Indo-Gangetic Plain to the north. If Maharashtra is included "Central India" includes a good part of the western coast, including Mumbai, but the eastern coast is never included, as Odisha stretches down to meet Andhra Pradesh, and these are counted in Eastern and Southern India respectively (and none of the eastern coast is part of the Hindi Belt).

Another definition is "the hill-country south of the Ganges plain", but north of the Deccan. Some official divisions of the country do not recognise any "Central" division at all.

Another definition, which treats the Deccan as a different unit, defines "Central India" as Madhya Pradesh and "eastern and central Uttar Pradesh". "Madhya Pradesh" means "central province", while "Uttar Pradesh" means "northern province", though when adopted in 1950 it had the advantage of preserving the common "UP" abbreviation for what was formerly the United Provinces of Agra and Oudh. This definition is rather similar to the territories, all princely states, grouped by the British Raj in 1854 as the Central India Agency (not to be confused with the Central Provinces, bordering this to the south).

The Memoir of Central India by Sir John Malcolm, Governor of Bombay begins with a definition:

The country termed Central India is, roughly speaking, the region lying between the twenty-first and twenty-fifth degrees of north latitude, and the seventy-third and eightieth degrees of east longitude...

Depending on definition, Indore, the commercial capital of Madhya Pradesh, is the largest city in the region. Other major cities include Raipur, Bhopal, Gwalior, Jabalpur, Durg-Bhilai and Bilaspur. The states share many linguistic and cultural characteristics with North India including the predominance of Hindi.

== History ==
The Bhimbetka caves show evidence of Paleolithic settlements in present-day Madhya Pradesh. Stone Age tools have also been discovered at various places along the Narmada river valley. Chalcolithic sites have been discovered at a number of places including Eran, Kayatha, Maheshwar, Nagda, and Navdatoli. Rock shelters with cave paintings, the earliest of which can be dated to 30,000 BCE, have also been discovered at a number of places. The settlements of humans in present-day Madhya Pradesh developed primarily in the valleys of rivers such as Narmada, Chambal, and Betwa. During the early Vedic period, the Vindhya mountains formed the southern boundary of the Indo-Aryan territory.

The Holkars of Indore, Scindias of Gwalior, Puars of Dewas Junior, Dewas Senior and Dhar State were powerful families of the Maratha Empire which were based in Central India. The territories that now comprises Madhya Pradesh and Chhattisgarh were ruled by numerous princes who entered into subsidiary alliance with the British.

After independence, the states of Madhya Bharat, Vindhya Pradesh, and Bhopal were merged into Madhya Pradesh in 1956. In 2000, the new state of Chhattisgarh was carved out of Madhya Pradesh.

== Language ==
A Hindi speaker, recorded in Taiwan.

The region is part of the Hindi Belt, and Modern Standard Hindi and Bundeli are the predominant languages. Other Hindi belt languages such as Chhattisgarhi are also common regionally. Besides these Indo-Aryan languages, the Munda-family language Korku is also spoken in Central India.

== See also ==
- Administrative divisions of India
- East India
- North India
- Northeast India
- South India
- Western India
