= Union territory =

Form of administrative division in India

- Category: Federated states
- Location: Republic of India
- Number: 8 (as of 2026)
- Populations: Lakshadweep – 64,473 (lowest); National Capital Territory of Delhi – 31,181,376 (highest)
- Areas: Lakshadweep – 32 km^{2} (12 sq mi) (smallest); Ladakh – 59,146 km^{2} (22,836 sq mi) (largest)
- Government: Central government
- Subdivisions: Districts Divisions

Among the states and union territories of India, a union territory (UT) is a region that is directly governed by the central government of India, as opposed to the states, which have their own state government systems. Unlike states, union territories do not have their own full-fledged government but are administered by a lieutenant governor or administrator appointed by the president of India.

Union territories are created for various reasons, including geographical importance, strategic necessity or historical factors. These areas are under the control of the central government to ensure uniformity in governance across the country. Some union territories, such as Delhi (National Capital Territory), Jammu and Kashmir and Puducherry have been granted special status and are allowed to have their own legislative assemblies, which can pass laws on certain matters, though the central government still retains significant authority, most importantly, the police forces and law-order.

The distinction between states and union territories is defined in the Constitution of India. The Constitution designed union territories to manage areas that require more direct central control or have specific administrative needs. This ensures that regions like Ladakh and Jammu and Kashmir remain directly controlled by the central government.

Currently, India has eight union territories: Andaman and Nicobar Islands, Chandigarh, Dadra and Nagar Haveli and Daman and Diu, Lakshadweep, Delhi, Puducherry, Ladakh, and Jammu and Kashmir.

== History ==
Comparison of the administrative divisions of India in 1951 and 1956
Districts of Jammu and Kashmir and List of districts of Ladakh as of November 2019.

When the Constitution of India was adopted in 1949, the Indian federal structure included:

- Part C states, which were chief commissioners' provinces and some princely states, each governed by a chief commissioner appointed by the President of India. The ten Part C states were Ajmer, Bhopal, Bilaspur, Coorg, Delhi, Himachal Pradesh, Cutch, Manipur, Tripura and Vindhya Pradesh.
- One Part D state (Andaman and Nicobar Islands) administered by a lieutenant governor appointed by the central government.

After the States Reorganisation Act, 1956, Part C and Part D states were combined into a single category of "Union territory". Due to various other reorganisations, only 6 union territories remained:

- Andaman and Nicobar Islands
- Laccadive, Minicoy & Amindivi Islands (later renamed Lakshadweep)
- Delhi
- Manipur
- Tripura
- Himachal Pradesh

By the early 1970s, Manipur, Tripura, and Himachal Pradesh had become full-fledged states, and Chandigarh became a union territory. Another three (Dadra and Nagar Haveli, Daman and Diu and Puducherry) were formed from acquired territories that were formerly part of Portuguese India and French India.

In August 2019, the Parliament of India passed Jammu and Kashmir Reorganisation Act, 2019. The act contains provisions to reconstitute the state of Jammu and Kashmir into two union territories, one to be eponymously called Jammu and Kashmir, and the other Ladakh on 31 October 2019.

In November 2019, the Government of India introduced legislation to merge the union territories of Dadra and Nagar Haveli and Daman and Diu into a single union territory to be known as Dadra and Nagar Haveli and Daman and Diu.

== Administration ==
The Parliament of India can pass a law to amend the constitution and provide a Legislature with elected Members and a Chief Minister for a union territory, as it has done for Delhi, Jammu and Kashmir and Puducherry. Generally, the President of India appoints an administrator or lieutenant governor for each UT.

Delhi, Puducherry, Jammu and Kashmir operate differently from the other five. They were given partial statehood and Delhi was redefined as the National Capital Territory (NCT) and incorporated into a larger area known as the National Capital Region (NCR). Delhi, Puducherry, Jammu and Kashmir have an elected legislative assembly and an executive council of ministers with a partially state-like function.

Due to the existence of union territories, many critics have resolved India into a semi-federal nation, as the central and state governments each have their domains and territories of legislation. Union territories of India have special rights and status due to their constitutional formation and development. The status of "union territory" may be assigned to an Indian sub-jurisdiction for reasons such as safeguarding the rights of indigenous cultures, averting political turmoil related to matters of governance, and so on. These union territories could be changed to states in the future for more efficient administrative control.

The Constitution does not stipulate how tax revenue is to be devolved to the union territories, unlike for the states. The fund's devolution to union territories by the union government has no criteria where all the revenue goes to the union government. Some union territories are provided more funds, while others are given less, arbitrarily by the union government. As union territories are directly ruled by the union government, some union territories get more funds from the union government than entitled on per capita and backwardness basis when compared to states.

After the introduction of GST, UT-GST is applicable in union territories that do not have a legislative assembly. UT-GST is levied at par with the applicable state GST in the rest of the country which would eliminate the previous lower taxation in the union territories.

== Constitutional status ==
Article 1 (1) of the Indian constitution says that India shall be a "Union of States", which is elaborated under Parts V (The Union) and VI (The States) of the constitution. Article 1 (3) says the territory of India comprises the territories of the states, the union territories and other territories that may be acquired. The concept of union territories was not in the original version of the constitution, but was added by the Constitution (Seventh Amendment) Act, 1956. Article 366(30) also defines union territory as any union territory specified in the First Schedule and includes any other territory comprised within the territory of India but not specified in that schedule. In the constitution wherever it refers to territories of India, it is applicable to the whole country including union territories. Where it refers to only India, it applies to all states only but not to union territories. Thus, citizenship (part II), fundamental rights (part III), Directive Principles of State Policy (part IV), Judiciary role, the Union Territories (part VIII), Article 245, etc. apply to union territories as it refers specifically to territories of India. The executive power of the Union (i.e. union of states only) rests with the president of India. The president of India is also the chief administrator of union territories as per Article 239. The union public service commission's role does not apply to all territories of India as it refers to India only in Part XIV.

The constitutional status of a union territory is similar to a state under the perennial president's rule per Article 356 subject to specific exemptions to a few union territories with legislative assembly. As Per Article 240 (1), supreme power is accorded to the president in regulating the affairs of all the union territories except Chandigarh, NCT and Puducherry, including powers to override the laws made by Parliament and the constitution of India. Article 240(2) allows implementing tax haven laws in these union territories to attract foreign capital and investments into India instead of depending on foreign tax haven countries.

The difference between states as listed in the First Schedule of the constitution and union territories with legislative assembly is that states were given autonomous powers as provided in the constitution without any possible interference by the parliament whereas UTs with legislative assembly (Part VIII) has similar powers but parliament is empowered to modify or repeal or suspend the laws made by a union territory (ultimate authority by the parliament unlike the independent nature of the states).

Three of the union territories have representation in the upper house of the Indian Parliament, the Rajya Sabha: Delhi, Jammu and Kashmir, and Puducherry. Puducherry, Jammu and Kashmir and NCT of Delhi are the only three union territories that are exceptional among union territories in that each has its own locally elected legislative assembly and have a chief minister.

== Current union territories ==
State	ISO	Vehicle code	Zone	Capital(s)	Largest city	Established	Population (2011)	Area (km^{2})	Official languages	Additional official languages
Andaman and Nicobar Islands	IN-AN	AN	Southern	Port Blair		1 November 1956	380,581	8,249	Hindi, English	—
Chandigarh	IN-CH	CH	Northern	Chandigarh		1 November 1966	1,055,450	114	Hindi, English	—
Dadra and Nagar Haveli and Daman and Diu	IN-DH	DD	Western	Daman	Silvassa	26 January 2020	587,106	603	Hindi, English	Gujarati
Delhi	IN-DL	DL	Northern	New Delhi	Delhi	1 November 1956	16,787,941	1,484	Hindi, English	Urdu, Punjabi
Jammu and Kashmir	IN-JK	JK	Northern	Srinagar (Summer) Jammu (Winter)	Srinagar	31 October 2019	12,258,433	42,241	Dogri, English, Hindi, Kashmiri, Urdu	—
Ladakh	IN-LA	LA	Northern	Leh (Summer) Kargil (Winter)	Leh	31 October 2019	290,492	59,146	Hindi, English	—
Lakshadweep	IN-LD	LD	Southern	Kavaratti		1 November 1956	64,473	32	English	Malayalam
Puducherry	IN-PY	PY	Southern	Pondicherry		16 August 1962	1,247,953	479	Tamil, Telugu, Malayalam	English, French
Total							32,672,429	112,348		

== Former union territories ==
Former union territories of India
Name	Zone	Capital	Area	Begin	End	Successor(s)	Map
Arunachal Pradesh	North-Eastern	Itanagar	83,743 km^{2} (32,333 sq mi)	21 January 1972	20 February 1987	As an Indian state	
Dadra and Nagar Haveli	Western	Silvassa	491 km^{2} (190 sq mi)	11 August 1961	26 January 2020	Dadra and Nagar Haveli and Daman and Diu (UT)	
Daman and Diu	Western	Daman	112 km^{2} (43 sq mi)	30 May 1987	26 January 2020	Dadra and Nagar Haveli and Daman and Diu (UT)	
Goa, Daman and Diu	Western	Panaji	3,814 km^{2} (1,473 sq mi)	19 December 1961	30 May 1987	Goa (state), Daman and Diu (UT)	
Himachal Pradesh	Northern	Shimla	55,673 km^{2} (21,495 sq mi)	1 November 1956	25 January 1971	As an Indian state	
Manipur	North-Eastern	Imphal	22,327 km^{2} (8,621 sq mi)	1 November 1956	21 January 1972	As an Indian state	
Mizoram	North-Eastern	Aizawl	21,081 km^{2} (8,139 sq mi)	21 January 1972	20 February 1987	As an Indian state	
Tripura	North-Eastern	Agartala	10,491 km^{2} (4,051 sq mi)	1 November 1956	21 January 1972	As an Indian state	

== Proposed union territories ==
There have been a number of movements and proposals to carve out additional states and union territories.

Proposed or previously proposed union territories of India
Name	Proposed status	Notes
Gorkhaland	Proposed	Proposed by Gorkha Janmukti Morcha in West Bengal for a separate homeland for Gorkhas. Discussions have included proposals for both statehood and union territory status.
Vidarbha	Proposed	Eastern region of Maharashtra; demand for separate statehood due to perceived neglect.
Coorg (Kodagu)	Historical	Former Part-C state; merged with Mysore (now Karnataka) in 1956.
Tulu Nadu	Proposed	Regions of coastal Karnataka and northern Kerala; demand based on linguistic identity.
Greater Cooch Behar	Proposed	Movement in northern West Bengal seeking separate status; leaders have advocated for union territory status.
Karbi Anglong	Proposed	Hill district in Assam with ongoing autonomy movements; demands for greater political identity.
Chandigarh as separate UT	Existing	Union territory serving as the shared capital of Punjab and Haryana; discussions exist about its status amid Punjab-Haryana disputes.
Delhi as full UT or full state	Proposed	Currently a union territory with legislature; proposals exist for full statehood or restructuring.

== See also ==
- Federalism in India
- Lawmaking procedure in India
- List of acts of the Parliament of India
- List of amendments of the Constitution of India
- Staff Selection Commission
