= List of divisions in India =

India is a union of states and union territories as per article 1 of the Indian Constitution. Some states and union territories are further divided into divisions, which are made up of groups of districts. An administrative division is led by an officer of the Indian Administrative Service, known as a divisional commissioner. There are 104 divisions in India.

The states of Andhra Pradesh, Goa, Gujarat, Kerala, Manipur, Mizoram, Sikkim, Tamil Nadu, Telangana, and Tripura as well as five of the union territories (Andaman and Nicobar Islands, Chandigarh, Dadra and Nagar Haveli and Daman and Diu, Lakshadweep Islands and Puducherry) are not divided into divisions. Instead, these states and territories go directly from the state to the district level for administrative purposes.

== Overview ==
No. of divisions in each state or UT
State/Union territory	No. of divisions	Population 2011 Census	Average population per division
States
Andhra Pradesh	-	49,386,799	-
Arunachal Pradesh	3	1,383,727	461,242
Assam	5	31,169,272	6,233,854
Bihar	9	104,099,452	11,566,606
Chhattisgarh	5	25,545,198	5,109,040
Goa	-	1,458,545	-
Gujarat	-	60,439,692	-
Haryana	6	25,351,462	4,225,244
Himachal Pradesh	3	6,864,602	2,288,201
Jharkhand	5	32,988,134	6,597,627
Karnataka	4	61,095,297	15,273,824
Kerala	-	33,406,061	-
Madhya Pradesh	10	72,626,809	7,262,681
Maharashtra	6	112,374,333	18,729,056
Manipur	-	2,721,756	-
Meghalaya	3	2,966,889	1,483,445
Mizoram	-	1,097,206	-
Nagaland	1	1,978,502	1,978,502
Odisha	3	41,974,218	13,991,406
Punjab	5	27,743,338	5,548,668
Rajasthan	7	68,548,437	6,854,844
Sikkim	-	610,577	-
Tamil Nadu	-	72,147,030	-
Telangana	-	35,193,978	-
Tripura	-	3,673,917	-
Uttar Pradesh	18	199,812,341	11,100,686
Uttarakhand	2	10,086,292	5,043,146
West Bengal	5	91,276,115	18,255,223
Union Territories
Andaman and Nicobar Islands	-	380,581	-
Chandigarh	-	1,055,450	-
Dadra and Nagar Haveli and Daman and Diu	-	586,956	-
Jammu and Kashmir	2	12,258,433	6,129,217
Ladakh	1	290,492	290,492
Lakshadweep	-	64,473	-
Delhi	1	16,787,941	16,787,941
Puducherry	-	1,247,953	-
Total	104	1,210,854,977	11,755,874

=== Regions within states ===
Some states consist of regions, which have no official administrative governmental status. They are purely geographic regions; some correspond to historic countries, states or provinces. A region may comprise one or more divisions, averaging about three divisions per region. However, the boundaries of the regions and the boundaries of the divisions do not always coincide exactly. So far there has been no movement to give the regions official administrative status. If this was to be done, it would presumably require that the boundaries of the regions be slightly modified so that they correspond exactly with their constituent districts.

- Regions of Assam (4)
  - Assam Proper region, Goalpara region, Kamrup region and Barak Valley region
- Regions of Gujarat (4)
  - North Gujarat, Central Gujarat, South Gujarat, and Saurashtra
- Regions of Kerala (3)
  - North Kerala, Central Kerala, and South Kerala
- Regions of Maharashtra (5)
  - Western Maharashtra (Desh), Vidarbha, Marathwada, North Maharashtra, and Konkan

== List of divisions ==
State/Union Territory	No. of divisions	Divisions	Headquarters	Districts
Arunachal Pradesh	3	East	Namsai	Lohit, Anjaw, Tirap, Changlang, Lower Dibang Valley, Dibang Valley, East Siang, Upper Siang, Longding, Namsai, Siang
Arunachal Pradesh	3	West	Lower Subansiri	Tawang, West Kameng, East Kameng, Papum Pare, Lower Subansiri, Kurung Kumey, Kra Daadi and Itanagar Capital Complex
Arunachal Pradesh	3	Central	Leprada	Upper Subansiri, Shi-Yomi, West Siang, Leparada and Lower Siang
Assam	5	Upper Assam Division	Jorhat	Charaideo, Dhemaji, Dibrugarh, Golaghat, Jorhat, Lakhimpur, Majuli, Sivasagar, and Tinsukia
Assam	5	Lower Assam Division	Guwahati	Baksa, Barpeta, Bongaigaon, Chirang, Dhubri, Goalpara, Nalbari, Kamrup Metropolitan, Kamrup Rural, Kokrajhar, and South Salmara-Mankachar
Assam	5	North Assam Division	Tezpur	Biswanath, Darrang, Sonitpur, and Udalguri
Assam	5	Central Assam Division	Nagaon	Hojai, Morigaon, and Nagaon
Assam	5	Hills and Barak Valley Division	Silchar	Dima Hasao, East Karbi Anglong, West Karbi Anglong, Cachar, Hailakandi, and Karimganj
Bihar	9	Patna division	Patna	Patna, Nalanda, Bhojpur, Rohtas, Buxar and Kaimur
Bihar	9	Tirhut division	Muzaffarpur	West Champaran, East Champaran, Muzaffarpur, Sitamarhi, Sheohar and Vaishali
Bihar	9	Saran division	Chhapra	Saran, Siwan and Gopalganj
Bihar	9	Darbhanga division	Darbhanga	Darbhanga, Madhubani and Samastipur
Bihar	9	Kosi division	Saharsa	Saharsa, Madhepura and Supaul
Bihar	9	Purnia division	Purnia	Purnia, Katihar, Araria and Kishanganj
Bihar	9	Bhagalpur division	Bhagalpur	Bhagalpur and Banka
Bihar	9	Munger division	Munger	Munger, Jamui, Khagaria, Lakhisarai, Begusarai and Sheikhpura
Bihar	9	Magadh division	Gaya	Gaya, Nawada, Aurangabad, Jehanabad and Arwal
Chhattisgarh	5	Surguja division	Ambikapur	Koriya, Balrampur-Ramanujganj, Surajpur, Jashpur, Surguja And Mahendragarh-Chirmiri
Chhattisgarh	5	Bilaspur division	Bilaspur	Bilaspur, Mungeli, Korba, Janjgir-Champa, Raigarh, Gaurella-Pendra-Marwahi, Sakti And Sarangarh-Bilaigarh
Chhattisgarh	5	Durg division	Durg	Kabirdham, Bemetara, Durg, Balod, Rajnandgaon, Mohla-Manpur-Chauki and Khairagarh
Chhattisgarh	5	Raipur division	Raipur	Mahasamund, Baloda Bazar, Gariaband, Raipur and Dhamtari
Chhattisgarh	5	Bastar division	Jagdalpur	Kanker (Uttar Bastar), Narayanpur, Kondagaon, Bastar, Dantewada (Dakshin Bastar), Bijapur and Sukma
Haryana	6	Hisar division	Hisar	Fatehabad, Jind, Hisar and Sirsa
Haryana	6	Gurgaon division	Gurugram	Gurugram, Mahendragarh and Rewari
Haryana	6	Ambala division	Ambala	Ambala, Kurukshetra, Panchkula and Yamuna Nagar
Haryana	6	Faridabad division	Faridabad	Faridabad, Palwal and Nuh
Haryana	6	Rohtak division	Rohtak	Jhajjar, Charkhi Dadri, Rohtak, Sonipat and Bhiwani
Haryana	6	Karnal division	Karnal	Karnal, Panipat and Kaithal
Himachal Pradesh	3	Kangra	Kangra	Chamba, Kangra and Una
Himachal Pradesh	3	Mandi	Mandi	Bilaspur, Hamirpur, Kullu, Lahaul and Spiti and Mandi
Himachal Pradesh	3	Shimla	Shimla	Kinnaur, Shimla, Sirmaur and Solan
Jharkhand	5	Palamu division	Palamu	Garhwa, Latehar and Palamu
Jharkhand	5	North Chotanagpur division	Hazaribagh	Bokaro, Chatra, Dhanbad, Giridih, Hazaribagh, Koderma and Ramgarh
Jharkhand	5	South Chotanagpur division	Ranchi	Gumla, Khunti, Lohardaga, Ranchi and Simdega
Jharkhand	5	Kolhan division	West Singhbhum	East Singhbhum, Seraikela Kharsawan district, and West Singhbhum
Jharkhand	5	Santhal Pargana division	Dumka	Godda, Deoghar, Dumka, Jamtara, Sahibganj and Pakur
Karnataka	4	Bangalore division	Bengaluru	Bengaluru Urban, Bengaluru Rural, Ramanagara, Chikkaballapura, Chitradurga, Davanagere, Kolar, Shivamogga and Tumakuru
Karnataka	4	Mysore division	Mysuru	Chamarajanagara, Chikkamagaluru, Dakshina Kannada, Hassan, Kodagu, Mandya, Mysuru and Udupi
Karnataka	4	Belgaum division	Belagavi	Bagalakote, Belagavi, Vijayapura, Dharwad, Gadag, Haveri and Uttara Kannada
Karnataka	4	Kalaburagi division	Kalaburagi	Ballari, Bidar, Kalaburagi, Koppala, Raichuru, Vijayanagara and Yadgir
Madhya Pradesh	10	Bhopal division	Bhopal	Bhopal, Raisen, Rajgarh, Sehore and Vidisha
Madhya Pradesh	10	Indore division	Indore	Alirajpur, Barwani, Burhanpur, Indore, Dhar, Jhabua, Khandwa and Khargone
Madhya Pradesh	10	Gwalior division	Gwalior	Gwalior, Ashoknagar, Shivpuri, Datia and Guna
Madhya Pradesh	10	Jabalpur division	Jabalpur	Balaghat, Chhindwara, Jabalpur, Katni, Mandla, Narsinghpur, Seoni and Dindori
Madhya Pradesh	10	Rewa division	Rewa	Rewa, Satna, Sidhi and Singrauli
Madhya Pradesh	10	Sagar division	Sagar	Chhatarpur, Damoh, Panna, Sagar, Tikamgarh and Niwari
Madhya Pradesh	10	Shahdol division	Shahdol	Anuppur, Shahdol and Umaria
Madhya Pradesh	10	Ujjain division	Ujjain	Agar, Ujjain, Dewas, Mandsaur, Neemuch, Ratlam and Shajapur
Madhya Pradesh	10	Chambal division	Morena	Morena, Sheopur and Bhind
Madhya Pradesh	10	Narmadapuram division	Narmadapuram	Betul, Harda and Narmadapuram
Maharashtra	6	Amravati division	Amravati	Akola, Amravati, Buldana, Yavatmal and Washim
Maharashtra	6	Aurangabad division	Aurangabad	Aurangabad Beed, Jalna, Osmanabad, Nanded, Latur, Parbhani and Hingoli
Maharashtra	6	Konkan division	Thane	Mumbai City, Mumbai Suburban, Thane, Palghar, Raigad, Ratnagiri and Sindhudurg
Maharashtra	6	Nagpur division	Nagpur	Bhandara, Chandrapur, Gadchiroli, Gondia, Nagpur and Wardha
Maharashtra	6	Nashik division	Nashik	Ahmednagar, Dhule, Jalgaon, Nandurbar and Nashik
Maharashtra	6	Pune division	Pune	Kolhapur, Pune, Sangli, Satara and Solapur
Meghalaya	3	Garo Hills	Tura	South West Garo Hills, West Garo Hills, North Garo Hills, East Garo Hills and South Garo Hills
Meghalaya	3	Khasi Hills	Shillong	West Khasi Hills, South West Khasi Hills, Ri-Bhoi, East Khasi Hills, Eastern West Khasi Hills
Meghalaya	3	Jaintia Hills	Jowai	West Jaintia Hills and East Jaintia Hills
Nagaland	1	Nagaland	Kohima	Chümoukedima, Dimapur, Kiphire, Kohima, Longleng, Mokokchung, Mon, Niuland, Noklak, Peren, Phek, Shamator, Tuensang, Tseminyü, Wokha and Zünheboto
Odisha	3	Central	Cuttack	Balasore, Bhadrak, Cuttack, Jagatsinghpur, Jajpur, Kendrapada, Khordha, Mayurbhanj, Nayagarh and Puri
Odisha	3	Northern	Sambalpur	Angul, Balangir, Bargarh, Deogarh, Dhenkanal, Jharsuguda, Kendujhar, Sambalpur, Subarnapur and Sundargarh
Odisha	3	Southern	Berhampur	Boudh, Gajapati, Ganjam, Kalahandi, Kandhamal, Koraput, Malkangiri, Nabarangpur, Nuapada and Rayagada
Punjab	5	Patiala	Patiala	Patiala, Sangrur, Malerkotla, Barnala, Fatehgarh Sahib and Ludhiana
Punjab	5	Faridkot	Faridkot	Faridkot, Bathinda and Mansa
Punjab	5	Firozepur	Firozepur	Firozepur, Moga, Shri Muktsar Sahib and Fazilka
Punjab	5	Jalandhar	Jalandhar	Jalandhar, Gurdaspur, Pathankot, Amritsar, Tarn Taran, Kapurthala and Hoshiarpur
Punjab	5	Ropar	Rup Nagar	Rup Nagar, Sahibzada Ajit Singh Nagar and Shaheed Bhagat Singh Nagar
Rajasthan	7	Jaipur division	Jaipur	Jaipur, Alwar, Jhunjhunu, Sikar and Dausa
Rajasthan	7	Jodhpur division	Jodhpur	Barmer, Jaisalmer, Jalore, Jodhpur, Pali and Sirohi
Rajasthan	7	Ajmer division	Ajmer	Ajmer, Bhilwara, Nagaur and Tonk
Rajasthan	7	Udaipur division	Udaipur	Udaipur, Banswara, Chittorgarh, Pratapgarh, Dungarpur and Rajsamand
Rajasthan	7	Bikaner division	Bikaner	Bikaner, Churu, Sri Ganganagar and Hanumangarh
Rajasthan	7	Kota division	Kota	Baran, Bundi, Jhalawar and Kota
Rajasthan	7	Bharatpur division	Bharatpur	Bharatpur, Dholpur, Karauli, Sawai and Madhopur
Uttar Pradesh	18	Agra division	Agra	Agra, Firozabad, Mainpuri and Mathura
Uttar Pradesh	18	Aligarh division	Aligarh	Aligarh, Etah, Hathras and Kasganj
Uttar Pradesh	18	Prayagraj division	Prayagraj	Prayagraj, Fatehpur, Kaushambi and Pratapgarh
Uttar Pradesh	18	Azamgarh division	Azamgarh	Azamgarh, Ballia and Mau
Uttar Pradesh	18	Bareilly division	Bareilly	Badaun, Bareilly, Pilibhit and Shahjahanpur
Uttar Pradesh	18	Basti division	Basti	Basti, Sant Kabir Nagar and Siddharthnagar
Uttar Pradesh	18	Chitrakoot division	Chitrakoot	Banda, Chitrakoot, Hamirpur and Mahoba
Uttar Pradesh	18	Devipatan division	Gonda	Bahraich, Balarampur, Gonda and Shravasti
Uttar Pradesh	18	Ayodhya division	Ayodhya	Ambedkar Nagar, Barabanki, Ayodhya, Sultanpur and Amethi
Uttar Pradesh	18	Gorakhpur division	Gorakhpur	Deoria, Gorakhpur, Kushinagar and Maharajganj
Uttar Pradesh	18	Jhansi division	Jhansi	Jalaun, Jhansi and Lalitpur
Uttar Pradesh	18	Kanpur division	Kanpur Nagar	Auraiya, Etawah, Farrukhabad, Kannauj, Kanpur Dehat and Kanpur Nagar
Uttar Pradesh	18	Lucknow division	Lucknow	Hardoi, Lakhimpur Kheri, Lucknow, Raebareli, Sitapur and Unnao
Uttar Pradesh	18	Meerut division	Meerut	Baghpat, Bulandshahar, Gautam Buddha Nagar, Ghaziabad, Meerut and Hapur
Uttar Pradesh	18	Mirzapur division	Mirzapur	Mirzapur, Sant Ravidas Nagar and Sonbhadra
Uttar Pradesh	18	Moradabad division	Moradabad	Bijnor, Amroha, Moradabad, Rampur and Sambhal
Uttar Pradesh	18	Saharanpur division	Saharanpur	Muzaffarnagar, Saharanpur and Shamli
Uttar Pradesh	18	Varanasi division	Varanasi	Chandauli, Ghazipur, Jaunpur and Varanasi
Uttarakhand	2	Kumaon division	Nainital	Almora, Bageshwar, Champawat, Nainital, Pithoragarh and Udham Singh Nagar
Uttarakhand	2	Garhwal division	Pauri	Chamoli, Dehradun, Haridwar, Pauri Garhwal, Rudraprayag, Tehri Garhwal and Uttarkashi
West Bengal	5	Presidency division	Kolkata	Howrah, Kolkata, Nadia, North 24 Parganas and South 24 Parganas
West Bengal	5	Medinipur division	Medinipur	Bankura, Jhargram, Paschim Medinipur, Purba Medinipur and Purulia
West Bengal	5	Malda division	Malda	Dakshin Dinajpur, Malda, Murshidabad and Uttar Dinajpur
West Bengal	5	Burdwan division	Hooghly	Birbhum, Hooghly, Paschim Bardhaman and Purba Bardhaman
West Bengal	5	Jalpaiguri division	Jalpaiguri	Alipurduar, Cooch Behar, Darjeeling, Jalpaiguri and Kalimpong
Delhi	1	Delhi division	Central Delhi	Central Delhi, East Delhi, New Delhi, North Delhi, North East Delhi, North West Delhi, Shahdara, South Delhi, South East Delhi, South West Delhi and West Delhi
Jammu and Kashmir	2	Jammu Division	Jammu	Jammu, Doda, Kathua, Kishtwar, Poonch, Rajouri, Ramban, Reasi, Samba and Udhampur
Jammu and Kashmir	2	Kashmir Division	Srinagar	Srinagar, Anantnag, Bandipora, Baramulla, Budgam, Ganderbal, Kulgam, Kupwara, Pulwama and Shopian
Ladakh	1	Ladakh Division	Leh	Kargil and Leh

== Exception ==
The states and union territories in India that do not have divisions and thus do not have divisional commissioners are as follows:

- Kerala
- Goa
- Tamil Nadu
- Andhra Pradesh
- Telangana
- Gujarat
- Manipur
- Mizoram
- Sikkim
- Lakshadweep (Union Territory)
- Chandigarh (Union Territory)
- Dadra and Nagar Haveli and Daman and Diu (Union Territory)

In these 12 areas, administrative divisions are not established, and hence the role of a divisional commissioner, who typically oversees revenue administration at the divisional level, does not exist. These nine states and three UTs directly divided into districts and district administration reports to the revenue department of the government.

== See also ==
- Administrative divisions of Assam
- Administrative divisions of Bihar
- Administrative divisions of Haryana
- Administrative divisions of Jharkhand
- Administrative divisions of Karnataka
- Administrative divisions of Kerala
- Administrative divisions of Uttar Pradesh
- Administrative divisions of Uttarakhand
- Administrative divisions of West Bengal
