= Goalpariya =

Goalpariya may refer to:

- anything associated with the Goalpara region of northeastern India
- Goalpariya dialect, the dialects spoken in the undivided Goalpara
- Goalpariya people, the native speakers of Goalpariya
- Goalpariya Lokgeet, the folk songs in Goalpariya
