= Zonal Councils of India =

States of India that have been grouped into six zones to foster cooperation among them

Zonal Councils of India

Zonal Councils are advisory councils and are made up of the states and union territories of India that have been grouped into six zones to foster cooperation among them. These were set up by Part-III of the States Reorganisation Act, 1956.

== Members ==
The Union Home Minister of India is the common chairman each of the five zonal councils. Within the each zonal council, the chief minister of the respective member states act as the vice-chairman of the council by rotation, holding office for a period of one year at a time. The governor of a union territory within a zone are not appointed as the vice-chairman.

== Zonal councils ==
The present composition of each of these Zonal Councils is as under:-

#	Name	Names of member states, UTs (marked *) & special invites (marked ^)	Number of states	Number of UTs (includes NCT-Delhi)	Headquarters	Notes
1.	Northern Zonal Council	Chandigarh*; Delhi*; Haryana; Himachal Pradesh; Jammu and Kashmir*; Ladakh*, Punjab; Rajasthan	4	4	New Delhi	
2.	Southern Zonal Council	Andaman and Nicobar Islands*^; Andhra Pradesh; Karnataka; Kerala; Puducherry*; Tamil Nadu; Telangana; Lakshadweep*^	5	3	Chennai	Covers Peninsular India. union territories of Andaman and Nicobar Islands and Lakshadweep are not members of any of the Zonal Councils. However, they are presently special invitees to the Southern Zonal Council.
3.	Central Zonal Council	Chhattisgarh; Madhya Pradesh; Uttar Pradesh; Uttarakhand	4	0	Prayagraj	
4.	Eastern Zonal Council	Bihar; Jharkhand; Odisha; West Bengal	4	0	Kolkata	
5.	Western Zonal Council	Dadra and Nagar Haveli and Daman and Diu*; Goa; Gujarat; Maharashtra	3	1	Mumbai	
6.	North Eastern Council	Arunachal Pradesh; Sikkim; Nagaland; Manipur; Mizoram; Tripura; Assam; Meghalaya	8	0	Shillong	Northeastern states are not covered by any of the Zonal Councils and their special problems are addressed by another statutory body, the North Eastern Council at Shillong, created by the North Eastern Council Act, 1971. This council originally comprised Arunachal Pradesh, Assam, Manipur, Meghalaya, Mizoram, Nagaland and Tripura; later the state of Sikkim was also added vide North Eastern Council (Amendment) Act, 2002 notified on 23 December 2002.

== Economy ==
With a nominal gross domestic product of 4.15 trillion US dollars in 2026, India ranks sixth in the world. It has a GDP growth rate of 6.48% and a per capita GDP of 2,813 US dollars.

The Table alongside shows the GDP of each starting from the highest. While the South Zone has the highest GDP, the East Zone has the lowest GDP.

=== GSDP at current prices (in ₹ billions) ===
Column Header	1	2	3	4	5	6	7	8	Zonal GDP
South	Andaman & Nicobar Islands	Andhra Pradesh	Karnataka	Kerala	Puducherry	Tamil Nadu	Telengana	Lakshadweep	117,480
GDP	Not Available	18,300	30,701	14,271	527	35,678	18,003	Not available	
Year	-	2025-26	2025-26	2024-25	2025-26	2025-26	2025-26	-	
North East	Arunachal Pradesh	Assam	Manipur	Meghalaya	Mizoram	Nagaland	Sikkim	Tripura	11,582
GDP	478	7,416	499	666	395	550	570	1008	
Year	2025-26	2025-26	2025-26	2024-25	2025-26	2025-26	2025-26	2025-26	
West	Dadra & Nagar Haveli and Daman & Diu	Goa	Gujarat	Maharashtra					80,604
GDP	Not available	1,390	29,820	49,394					
Year		2025-26	2025-26	2024-25					
North	Chandigarh	Delhi	Haryana	Himachal Pradesh	Jammu & Kashmir	Ladakh	Punjab	Rajasthan	60,988
GDP	478	7416	499	666	395	550	570	1008	
Year	2025-26	2025-26	2025-26	2024-25	2025-26	2025-26			
Central	Chhattisgarh	Madhya Pradesh	Uttar Pradesh	Uttarakhand					58,388
GDP	6,350	16,945	30,800	4,293					
Year	2025-26	2025-26	2025-26	2025-26					
East	Bihar	Jharkhand	Odisha	West Bengal					47,481
GDP	10,970	5,563	10630	20318					
Year	2025-26	2025-26	2025-26	2025-26					

== See also ==
- Cultural Zones of India, seven cultural zones in India
- Administrative divisions of India
- List of ecoregions in India, 46 ecoregions in India
- List of special economic zones in India
