= Assent =

Assent may refer to:

- Assent (philosophy), or katalepsis, the mental act of accepting a statement as true
- Offer and acceptance, in contract law
- Royal assent, the method by which a monarch formally approves an act of the legislature
- Assent (military), various types of recruitment or acquisition in the Austro-Hungarian Army (1867–1918) and Austrian military
- Assent (Belgium), a locality in the Arrondissement of Leuven
- The Assent, a 2019 American horror film by Pearry Reginald Teo
