= Eastern Zonal Council =

Zones of India

Eastern Zonal Councils in Blue, India

Eastern Zonal Council is a zonal council that comprises the states of Bihar, Jharkhand, Odisha and West Bengal.

The States have been grouped into six zones having an Advisory Council to foster cooperation among these States. Five Zonal Councils were set up vide Part-III of the States Reorganisation Act, 1956.

== See also ==
- Northern Zonal Council
- North-Eastern Zonal Council
- Central Zonal Council
- Western Zonal Council
- Southern Zonal Council
