= Assent (military) =

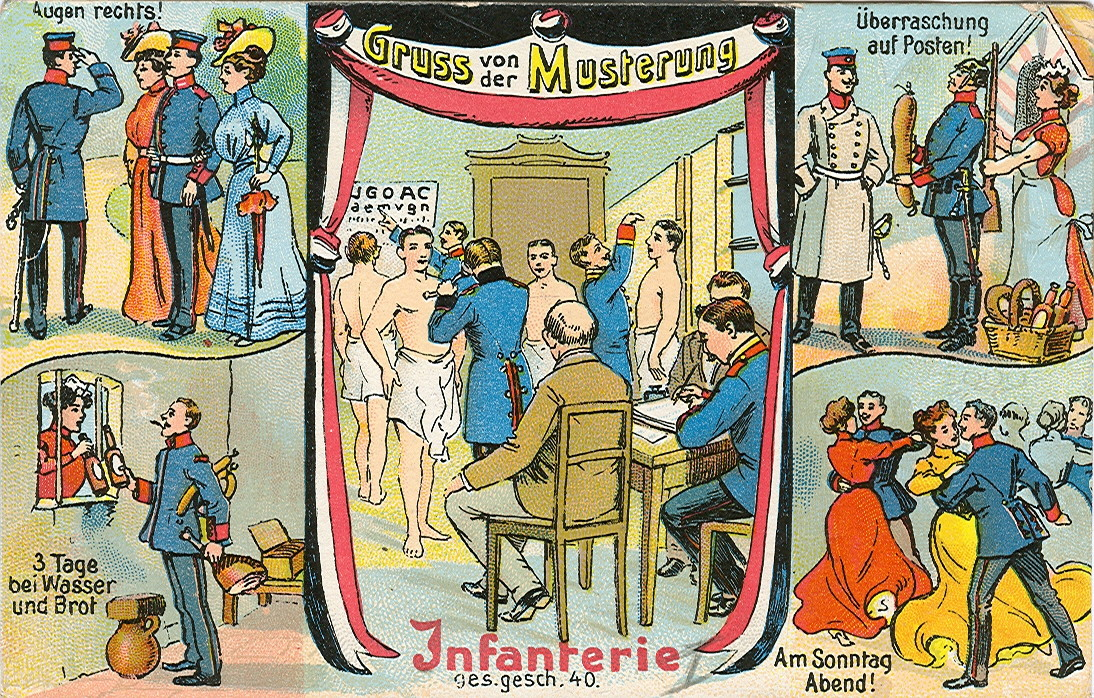

Assent, also assentation (German: Assentierung) was the process of incorporation (recruitment) of persons liable to military service into the former Austro-Hungarian Army (1867–1918). It was also the designation for the purchase of horses by the so-called remount-commission (de: Remonte-Kommission). The word comes from the Latin as-sentãrĩ, and means literal agree to, accede to, or to determine someone fit for a defined purpose (e.g. military service).

Assent was also the integration of military cadets (after passed cadet's examination) into the Austrian armed forces.
