= Overseas military bases of India =

This article lists military bases of India abroad. As of 2025, India had one overseas military base, Ayni Air Base, in Tajikistan, from which it withdrew that year.

== Former bases ==
- Maldives – India had withdrawn its soldiers from Maldives by 2024 after Maldives's government ordered the removal.
- Tajikistan – Airbases at Farkhor and Hisar. The lease for the base expired in 2022 and Tajikistan refused to renew the lease, which led to the withdrawal of Indian forces.

== See also ==
- Power projection
- List of countries with overseas military bases
