= Central Zonal Council =

Zonal council of India

Central Zonal Council of India shown in green

Central Zonal Council is a zonal council that comprises the states of Chhattisgarh, Madhya Pradesh, Uttar Pradesh, and Uttarakhand.

The States have been grouped into six zones having an Advisory Council to foster cooperation among these States. Five Zonal Councils were set up vide Part-III of the States Reorganisation Act, 1956.

== See also ==
- Northern Zonal Council
- North-Eastern Zonal Council
- Eastern Zonal Council
- Western Zonal Council
- Southern Zonal Council
