= Assam Proper =

Region in Assam, India

Assam Proper (also Kamrup, Pragjyotish) is a region in Assam, India, that is constituted by the five colonial districts that were originally in the Ahom kingdom. The districts were: Undivided Kamrup district, Darrang, Nagaon, Lakhimpur and Sibsagar.
