= Regions of Assam =

Regions in Indian state of Assam

The Regions of Assam are non-administrative units in the Indian state of Assam with a common historical past. Not all these regions are mutually exclusive.

== The Regions ==
Assam Proper region: This is the region that is constituted by the five colonial districts that were originally in the Ahom kingdom. The districts were: Darrang, Nagaon, Lakhimpur and Sibsagar.

Goalpara region: Former Eastern Rangpur region. This is the region between the Sankosh and the manas rivers on the north bank of the Brahmaputra river, with a corresponding region on the south bank.

Kamrup region: Former Greater Kamrup region. This is the region between the Manas river in the west and the Barnadi river on the east on the north bank of the Brahmaputra river, with a corresponding region on the south bank.

Barak Valley region: The Barak Valley in Assam includes Cachar, Hailakandi and Karimganj districts are often called Kachar region and South Assam region, which, excluding Karimganj and including North Cachar (Dima Hasao) together formed the erstwhile undivided Cachar district, a part of the Kachari kingdom, that was under the command of Gobinda Chandra. Karimganj district was a part of the colonial Sylhet district of Assam.
