= Goalpara region =

- Region
- Country: India
- State: Assam
- District: Kokrajhar, Bongaigaon, Dhubri and Goalpara

Languages
  - Official: Assamese
  - Additional official: Boro
- Time zone: UTC+5:30 (IST)

Goalpara region, largely congruous to the historical undivided Goalpara district, is a region that is associated with the people and culture of Goalpara. It is bounded on the north by Bhutan, on the east by the Kamrup region, in the south by Meghalaya and in the west by Cooch Behar and Jalpaiguri in West Bengal and Rangpur in Bangladesh. The natural landmarks are: Sankosh and Brahmaputra rivers on the west, the Manas River on the east in the north bank, and a corresponding region in the south bank; the Garo Hills in the south and Bhutan Hills in the north.

== History ==
In ancient times, it was a part of a division of the Kamarupa kingdom. After the fall of the Kamarupa dynasties Sandhya, a later Kamarupa king, moved his capital from Kamarupanagara (present-day Guwahati) to Kamatapur (near Cooch Behar town) in the middle of the 13th century, and established the Kamata kingdom. This situation prevailed till the time of Naranarayana, when it became a part of Koch Hajo. It was defined as an administrative unit for the first time in the 17th century when it was called Sarkar Dhekuri under the Bengal Subah of the Mughals. After the transfer of the Bengal Diwani to the East India Company, the Goalpara region, minus the Assam Dooars, then under Bhutan, came to be called Rangamatty, and after 1816, "Northeast Rangpur". When the British constituted this as a district in 1833 it came to be known after its headquarters which was in Goalpara town. A portion of the Assam Dooars areas were added to this district after the Bhutan war of 1865.

== People ==
A majority of the people are Rabha and Mech and Garo communities from earlier times. The Goalpariya dialect and Rabha language spoken here is a part of Rajbongshi and Rabha. Assamese Brahmin and Kayastha communities are small, and even the Kalitas, who have a dominating presence in the adjoining Kamrup region, are not as significant.

The Bodos form a strong presence in the region. Traditionally, they are called Kacharis in the south and in the rest of Assam, but called Mech on the north bank of the Brahmaputra River and the whole of North Bengal. Their strongest presence is in the present Kokrajhar district on the north bank. The Rabhas, along with the Bodos, are a semi-Hinduized group concentrated in the south bank. The Garos and the Hajongs too are not insignificant in the south.

As for the Muslim population, which is not insignificant, a distinction is made between the local indigenous (deshi) communities that are descendants of convert ethnic groups, and non-local (bhatiya) who have immigrated in recent times from downstream in East Bengal (Bangladesh).
