= Northern Zonal Council =

Zonal council in India

States under North Indian Zonal Council in Orange

Northern Zonal Council is a zonal council that comprises the states of Haryana, Himachal Pradesh, Punjab and Rajasthan; the union territories of Chandigarh, Jammu and Kashmir and Ladakh and the National Capital Territory of Delhi.

The States have been grouped into six zones having an Advisory Council to foster cooperation among these States. Five Zonal Councils were set up vide Part-III of the States Reorganisation Act, 1956.

== See also ==
- North-Eastern Zonal Council
- Central Zonal Council
- Eastern Zonal Council
- Western Zonal Council
- Southern Zonal Council
- Northwest India, similar grouping of states
