= Southern Zonal Council =

Zonal council in India

Southern India Zonal Council in red

Southern Zonal Council is a zonal council that comprises the states and union territories of Andhra Pradesh, Karnataka, Kerala, Puducherry, Tamil Nadu, and Telangana.

Andaman and Nicobar Islands, Lakshadweep are not members of any of the Zonal Councils. However, they are presently special invitees to the Southern Zonal Council.

The states of India have been grouped into six zones with an Advisory Council that aims to foster cooperation among these states. Five Zonal Councils were set up vide Part-III of the States Reorganisation Act, 1956.

== See also ==
- Northern Zonal Council
- North-Eastern Zonal Council
- Central Zonal Council
- Eastern Zonal Council
- Western Zonal Council
