= Western Zonal Council =

Zones of India

Western India Zonal Council in pink

Western Zonal Council is a zonal council comprising the states of Goa, Gujarat, Maharashtra and the Union Territory of Dadra and Nagar Haveli and Daman and Diu.

The States have been grouped into six zones having an Advisory Council to foster cooperation among these States. Five Zonal Councils were set up vide Part-III of the States Reorganisation Act, 1956.

== See also ==
- Northern Zonal Council
- North-Eastern Zonal Council
- Central Zonal Council
- Eastern Zonal Council
- Southern Zonal Council
