= North Eastern Council =

Statutory advisory body for Northeast India

North Eastern Council shown in deep blue alongside the five Zonal Councils

North Eastern Council (NEC) is a statutory advisory body constituted under the North Eastern Council Act 1971 and came into being on 7 November 1972 at Shillong. The eight States of Northeast India viz. Arunachal Pradesh, Assam, Manipur, Meghalaya, Mizoram, Nagaland, Tripura and Sikkim, are members of the council, with their respective Chief Ministers and Governors representing them. Sikkim was added to the council in the year 2002. The headquarters of the council is situated in Shillong and functions under the Ministry of Development of North Eastern Region (DONER) of the Government of India.

== Role ==
The Council was initially set up as an advisory body but now sanctioned as a Regional planning body since 2002. They now discuss any matter in which the North Eastern States have a common interest and decide the action to be taken on any such matter. This was done so as to take care of the economic and social planning of these states, as well as to provide mediation in the event of inter-State disputes.

== Funding ==
The funding of the Council mainly lies with the Central Government, with historically 56% contributed by the state governments and the rest by the central govt departments. 3 year plan issued in 2017, envisages an annual budget of INR2500 crore, 40% from the government and the rest 60% from the Non-Laspable Central Pool of Resources (NLCPR).

== Impact ==
The distribution of financial resources spent has been 47% towards transport and communication, 14% in agriculture, 11% in human resource development and education, 9% in power, 4% in health, 3% in tourism and 3% in industries for fiscal year 2017. The Council has demonstrated considerable achievements, mostly in the provision of electricity, education, highways and bridges development in the North-Eastern States. The Council has also taken up major highway and bridge building projects and funds several engineering and medical colleges. The council has funded projects producing around 250 megawatts of electricity to reduce the region's dependency on the States of West Bengal and Odisha.

== See also ==
- India–Myanmar border
