= Ramsharan Darnal =

Nepalese ethnomusicologist

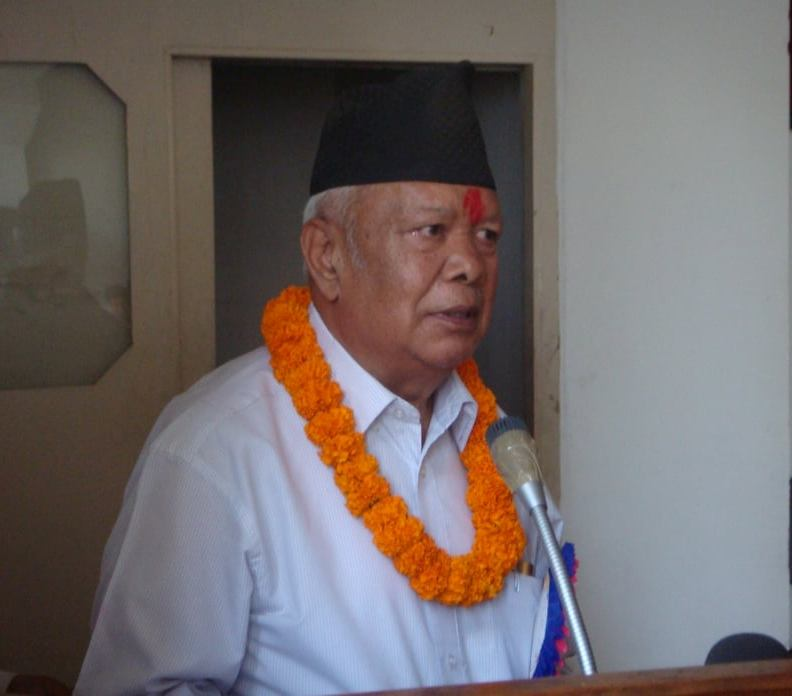
- Born: 10 July 1937; Dhobichaur, Kathmandu, Nepal
- Died: 18 September 2011 (aged 74); Thamel Marg, Kathmandu, Nepal
- Known for: Ethnomusicology
- Notable work: Sangeet Parikrama; Nepali Sangeet Sadhak; Nepali Sangeet-Sanskriti; Nepali Baja
- Spouse: Harimaya Darnal
- Children: 4
- Awards: Jagadamba Shree Purasakar (2009); Narayan Gopal Sangeet Puraskar (2009); Lunkaran Das Ganga Devi Chaudhary Puraskar (2005); Noor Ganga Puraskar (2004); Rashtriya Pratibha Puraskar (1996)

Ramsharan Darnal (Nepali: रामशरण दर्नाल; 10 July 1937 – 18 September 2011) was a Nepalese ethnomusicologist best known for initiating and publicizing the study of music of different ethnic groups in Nepal. He also played an important role in the popularization of a few western instruments in Nepal.

== Early life and education ==
Ramsharan Darnal, named Danda Kumar at Nwaran, was born on 10 July 1937, in Dhobichaur, Kathmandu to the-then drum major Satyakumar Darnal and his wife, Dilkumari Darnal. Born to a lower caste family, deemed untouchable during the Rana regime, Darnal was no stranger to hardships. In fact, despite being the second child born to his parents, he was the first to survive. Due to his father’s musical background, he was exposed to music at an early age.

Darnal was an alumnus of Durbar High School, Kathmandu and was sent to St. Robert’s School, Darjeeling, India for secondary education, where he learned to play the mandolin and the guitar.

== Personal life ==
Darnal had a weak immune system since birth, and was carried to health practitioners and faith healers from time to time. In 1948, an eleven-year-old Ramsharan was wed to a nine-year-old Harimaya from Mahadevsthan Mandan, Kavrepalanchok in high hopes of his cure. In 1951, he left for Darjeeling to complete his education. He spent a total of 12 years abroad. Amiable and articulate Darnal fathered three sons and a daughter.

== Career ==
Darnal, amid his schooling in India, started working at a recording company in Kolkata, where he was acquainted with fellow Nepalese musicians and singers, including Dharmaraj Thapa, Nati Kaji, Shiva Shankar Manandhar and Tara Devi. In 1958, Darnal brought to Nepal the mandolin and the guitar, and is considered to be the first person to introduce such western instruments in the country. Expanding his career contacts landed him a job at the Nepal Academy in 1959 as a mandolinist. Five years later, he was appointed as the secretary of the Nepal Music and Dance Academy as a part of a three-year plan brought about by the-then King Mahendra of Nepal. He was fired from the post by Kedar Man Vyathit in 1966 but was soon reinstated on account of Surya Bikram Gyawali, after which he worked at the academy until 2004. The contributions of Darnal in the field of ethnomusicology are, to say the least, commendable. Moreover, under the guidance of Puskal Budaprithi, he extended his research to include western traditions and instruments. His admirable contributions in the fields of songwriting, music and musical instruments have made him a cultural icon.

During his time at the Academy, he was the sole member in charge of the Music Museum, a depository of 127 musical instruments of hundred different types, including the 2500 years old Kwatah used in the time of the Buddha. After working for 35 years as a notator, Darnal retired from the Academy.

Darnal, who was brought into the Arts Department for Rs. 150 a month by Sangeet Shiromani Yagya Raj Sharma, spent 50 years at the Academy, till 2009. He was a member of the Academic Council from 2004 to 2009. He worked at Music Nepal shortly after his retirement. He was a patron and worked as an advisor for several cultural organizations, including the Tribhuvan University Music Department, Nepalese Folk Musical Instrument Museum, and Nepal Dalit Literature and Cultural Academy.

=== Musical composition ===
Throughout his stay in Darjeeling, Darnal progressed substantially in the field of musicology and was acquainted with literary highbrows such as Lakhi Devi Sundas and Shiva Kumar Rai. He was adept at playing the piano, the drums, and the guitar. When he returned to Kathmandu from Kolkata, he brought several musical instruments including the mandolin and the guitar.

Ramsharan was the first person to introduce the guitar and the mandolin in Nepal. He is known to have given guitar lessons to musician Prem Dhoj Pradhan. He is credited with the musical composition of several songs by Ishwor Ballav. He composed the music for Madhav Prasad Ghimire’s "Gauchha Geet Nepali". The notation for MBB Shah’s "Uska Laagi Ra Feri Usaika Laagi" was written by him. However, Darnal’s innate musicality is exceptionally well rendered in "He Bir Hida Aghi Sari".

=== Ethnomusicology and writing ===
"Folk music is the life of a nation."

— Ramsharan Darnal

"Nepalese culture and folk music are as close as one second is to another."

— Ramsharan Darnal

Darnal, devoting himself to ethnomusicology, travelled throughout Nepal, including several districts of the Sudurpashchim Province, looking for traditional musical instruments and folk music. He is believed to have collected over 365 types of instruments, including the Hudka. He is known as the first person to initiate the registration of musical instruments in official records.

Heavy monsoon rains in 1968 resulted in the demolition of Darnal’s abode, which further resulted in the burial of his mother and 15 types of musical instruments under the rubble. This, he considered the lowest point in his life. His life, later on, took a sharp turn as he became more and more active in writing as compared to musicology. In around 1967, he published his first article, "Nepali Sanskriti ma Vadyavadan ko Sthan", in Sangalo, a newspaper company based in Benares. The article was revised and published a year later in Gorkhapatra. He wrote, in total, 11 books revolving around Nepalese music and 375 endangered traditional instruments, which, in Nepal in the 1960s, were scarce. The person to initiate the study of the life of Bise Nagarchi, Darnal has come to be known as an exemplar of hard work and perseverance.

== Works ==
- Sangeet Parikrama (1981)
- Nepali Sangeet Sadhak (1981)
- Vishwa Vikhyat Sangeetkar (1984)
- Sangeet ko Vistrit Avalokan (1984)
- Nepali Sangeet-Sanskriti (1988)
- Sangeet Saurabh (2002)
- Nepali Baagina ra Kala (2003)
- Nepali Baja (2004)
- Gaayan Shaili (2004)
- Kathmandu Upatyaka ka Pracheen Samasamayik Geetharu (2010)

== Awards and honours ==
Darnal has received several awards and honours for his indispensable contributions in the field of ethnomusicology.

Nepal Post, in honour of Darnal’s contributions, has published tickets with a picture of Darnal, which is worth ten rupees.

The curriculum developed by the Ministry of Education, Nepal includes Darnal’s biography, entitled "Sangeetagya Ramsharan Darnal", as a part of Nepali textbooks for grade 9.

=== Awards ===
- Jagadamba Shree Purasakar (2009)
- Narayan Gopal Sangeet Puraskar (2009)
- Lunkaran Das Ganga Devi Chaudhary Puraskar (2005)
- Indra Rajya Laxmi Puraskar (2005)
- Noor Ganga Puraskar (2004)
- Jhapat Puraskar (2003)
- Rashtriya Pratibha Puraskar (1996)

=== Honours ===
| Date | Honour | Grounds | Presenter |
|---|---|---|---|
| 4 October 2010 | Certificate of recognition | Ethnomusicology | Shree Lunkaran Das Ganga Devi Chaudhary Academy for Arts and Literature, Kathmandu |
| 17 August 2010 | First general and national assemblies | Nepalese arts and culture | Nepal Band Baja Vyavasayi Sangh |
| 7 August 2010 | Public felicitation | Writings on music and arts | Pariyar Sewa Samiti |
| 18 July 2010 | Certificate of recognition | Ethnomusicology | Nepal Communist Party, Ward 17 Committee |
| 21 March 2010 | Certificate of recognition | Centenary of Mahakavi Devkota | International Nepali Literary Conference |
| 11 December 2009 | Centenary of Mahakavi Laxmi Prasad Devkota | Nepalese literature | Trimurti Niketan |
| 7 November 2009 | Certificate of recognition | Democratic conduct | Nepal Sanskritik Sangh |
| 10 August 2008 | Certificate of recognition | Nepalese arts and culture | Gyangun Prakashan |
| 14 July 2008 | Certificate of recognition | Ethnomusicology | Dance Culture Centre of Nepal |
| 13 July 2008 | Certificate of recognition | Ethnomusicology | Bhanu Pratisthan |
| 18 October 2007 | Certificate of recognition | Societal progression | |
| 22 June 2007 | Aawaz Cultural Evening, 2064 | Musical composition | Aawaz Kalakar, Nepal |
| 4 April 2006 | Certificate of recognition | 10th anniversary of Shrastha Samman | Shree Lunkaran Das Ganga Devi Chaudhary Academy for Arts and Literature, Kathmandu |
| 17 April 2005 | 43rd National Liberation Day | Advocacy of Dalit rights | Upekshit, Utpidit Dalit Varga Utthan Vikas Samiti |
| 14 July 2005 | Silver Jubilee Programme and 112th Bhanu Jayanti | Ethnomusicology | Little Angels' School |
| 9 April 2005 | Education for empowerment and creativity | Ethnomusicology | Om Education Academy |
| 4 March 2005 | Public felicitation | Advocacy of Dalit rights | Nepal National Dalit Social Welfare Organisation |
| 26 August 2004 | Certificate of recognition | Advocacy of Dalit rights | T.R. Bishwakarma Smriti Pratisthan |
| 20 June 2004 | Certificate of recognition | Nepalese literature | Noor Ganga Pratibha Puraskar Guthi |
| 2004 | Token of love | | Kantipur Television |
| 6 January 2004 | Certificate of recognition | 6th National Folk Dance Competition | Sadhana Kala Kendra |
| 6 December 2003 | 19th Dalit Litterateur Convention | Social work | Bharatiya Dalit Sahitya Academy |
| 16 November 2003 | Certificate of recognition | Nepalese literature | Jhapat Puraskar Vyavastha Samiti |
| 22 August 2003 | Certificate of recognition | 5th National Interschool Piano Competition | Ministry of Education |
| 17 August 2003 | Certificate of recognition | Musical composition | Madhurima |
| 11 April 2003 | 20th Regional Interschool Cultural Competition | Nepalese arts and culture | Curriculum Development Centre |
| 25 August 2002 | Public felicitation | Nepalese arts and culture | Dalit Sewa Sangh |
| 7 May 2002 | Certificate of appreciation | Ethnomusicology | Nepal Academy of Fine Arts |
| 25 April 2002 | Certificate of recognition | Ethnomusicology | Laligurans National Academy |
| 15 April 2002 | Public felicitation | Ethnomusicology | Kathmandu Nritya Tatha Sanskritik Kendra |
| 19 August 2000 | Certificate of recognition | People of the Century | Kathmandu Metropolitan City |
| 1999 | Dharmo Rakshati Rakshit Samaroha | Nepalese arts and culture | Om Pashupati Sena, Nepal |
| 11 March 1999 | 35th Annual Programme | Ethnomusicology | Kalanidhi Indira Sangeet Mahavidyalaya |
| 1998 | Visit Nepal Year 1998 | Nepalese arts and culture | Sadhana Kala Kendra |
| 1998 | Certificate of appreciation | National Folk Dance Competition, 2055 | Sadhana Kala Kendra |
| 12 April 1997 | 17th Ward Programme, 2053 | Children’s Folk Dance Competition | Kathmandu Metropolitan City |
| 21 January 1997 | Silver Jubilee of the King’s Coronation | Ethnomusicology | Sadhana Kala Kendra |
| | Certificate of recognition | Nepalese arts and culture | Bise Nagarchi Smriti Pratisthan |
| 23 January 1996 | Sadhana Samman | Ethnomusicology | Sadhana Kala Kendra |
| 13 February 1995 | Certificate of appreciation | Advocacy of Dalit rights | Nepal Utpidit Jatiya Mukti Samaj, Butwal |
| 21 August 1994 | Certificate of appreciation | Nepalese art and culture | Kirateshwor Sangeetashram, Gaurighat |
| 29 December 1992 | Order of Gorkha Dakshina Bahu | Indispensable contributions | Narayanhiti Palace |
| 14 December 1988 | Certificate of recognition | Advocacy of Dalit rights | Bharatiya Dalit Sahitya Academy |
| 10/11 April 1988 | Certificate of recognition | Advocacy of Dalit rights | Purvanchal Chhetriya Dalit Sammelan Tayaari Samiti, Dharan |

== Death ==
Darnal suffered from Parkinson's disease for a long time until his demise on 18 September 2011 at the age of 74.
