= Bairagi Kailaka Kabitaharu =

1974 book by Bairagi Kainla

- First edition
- Author: Bairagi Kainla
- Original title: वैरागी काइँलाका कविताहरू
- Language: Nepali
- Genre: Poetry
- Published: 1974
- Publisher: Sajha Prakashan
- Publication place: Nepal
- Media type: Print (Paperback)
- Award: Sajha Puraskar
- OCLC: 727262833

Bairagi Kailaka Kabitharu (Nepali: वैरागी काइँलाका कविताहरू, lit. 'Poems of Bairagi Kainla') is a 1974 Nepali poetry collection by Bairagi Kainla. It was published in 1974 (2031 BS) by Sajha Prakashan. It is the first book of the author. The poems in this collection were later reprinted in a book titled Bairagi Kainla ka Sankalit Kavita with his other poems by Phoenix Books. Kainla is known as progenitor of the Tesro Aayam (Third Dimension) movement in Nepali literature alongside Indra Bahadur Rai and Ishwor Ballav. He received the Sajha Puraskar for this book.

== Synopsis ==
The poems in this collection deals with the social and cultural elements of the Nepalese society. The poet uses inspiration from Greek, African as well as Limbu mythologies to draw parallel to present day society. Aawaran (cover), Aaunlaharu Chumera (After kissing the fingers), Ek Raat (One night) are some of the poems included in this collection.

== Reception ==
The book won the prestigious Sajha Puraskar for 2031 BS (c. 1974–1975). The award is given every year to the best book published by the publication within that year. Manjushree Thapa translated Parbat, one of his poems from this collection as The Mountain and described the poem as "obscure at times, filled with innuendoes, subtle connotations, double entendres and the possibility of multiple interpretations". The book became immensely popular among Nepalese readers. The poet was widely sought in Kathmandu and Darjeeling by the people to listen his recitals.

== See also ==
- Ghumne Mechmathi Andho Manche
- Muna Madan
- Gauri
