= 2022 Gorkhaland Territorial Administration election =

Election in West Bengal, India

- 26 June 2022

All 45 seats in the Gorkhaland Territorial Administration 23 seats needed for a majority
- Registered: 7.32 lakh
- Turnout: 59.05% ▲
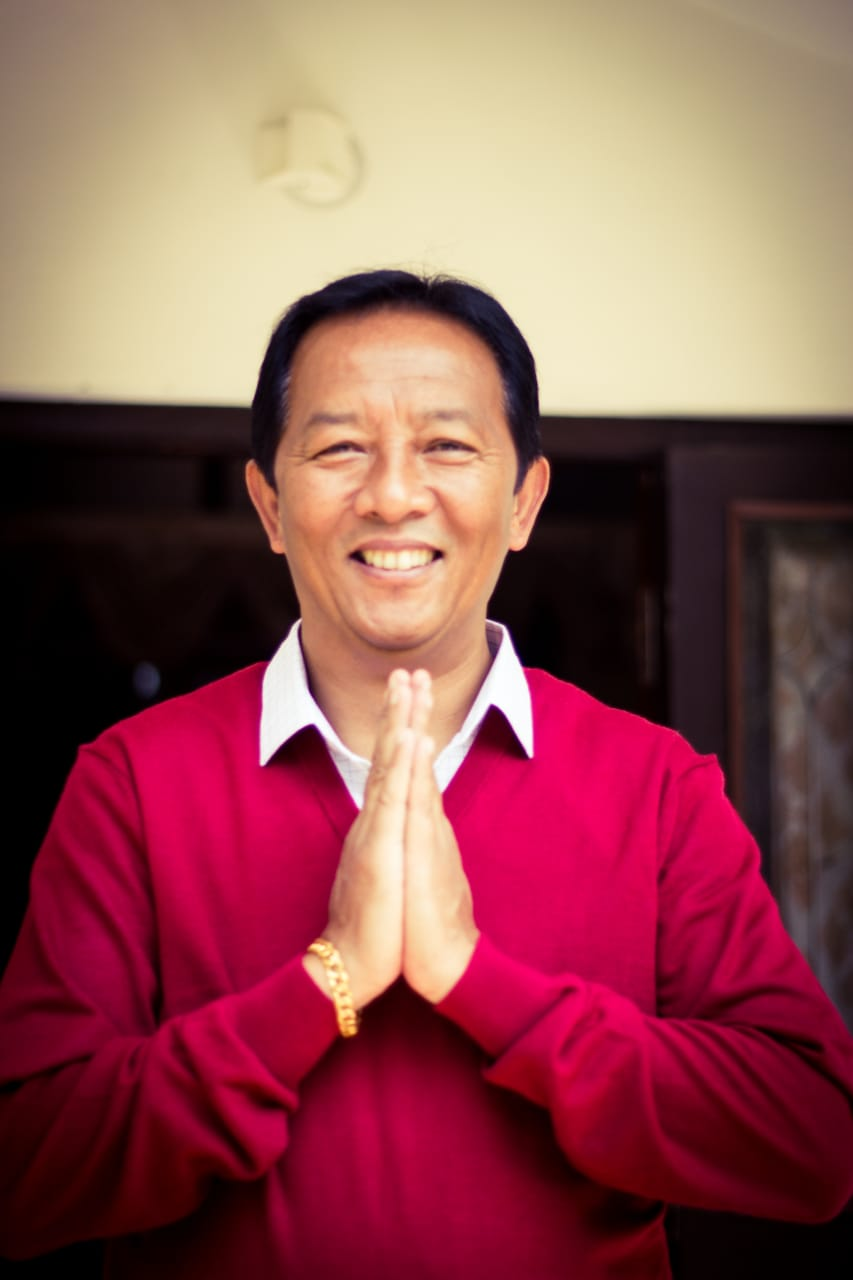
	Majority party	Minority party	Third party
	BGPM	IGJF
Leader	Anit Thapa	Ajoy Edwards	Binay Tamang
Party	BGPM	IGJF	AITC
Leader since	2022	2021	2021
Leader's seat	Kurseong	Darjeeling Sadar 3	Dali-Bloomfield
Last election	New party	New party	0 seats
Seats won	27	8	5
Chief executive before election
vacant
Chief executive after election
Anit Thapa
BGPM

Gorkhaland Territorial Administration election were held on 26 June 2022 to elect all 45 members of Gorkhaland Territorial Administration, in West Bengal state, India.

== Background ==
The previous election took place in 2012 which was won by GJM. In 2017, all GJM councillors resigned from their posts stating that GTA failed to fulfill their expectations and aspirations of the people. Sooner Binay Tamang was appointed by the Government of West Bengal as acting chairman of the body. Later Anit Thapa was appointed as its acting chairman.

Following the municipal election all over the state, West Bengal State Election Commission announced the date of poll on 27 May 2022. GJM leader and previous chairman of GTA, Bimal Gurung started a hunger strike in demand for the postponement of the election, just after the poll date was announced. BJP also supported Gurung and stated that GTA is not a permanent solution of the Gorkha issues.

== Schedule ==
The election schedule was declared by West Bengal State Election Commission on 27 May 2022.

Poll event	Schedule
Notification Date	27 May
Last Date for filing nomination	3 June
Scrutiny of nomination	4 June
Last Date for withdrawal of nomination	6 June
Date of poll	26 June
Date of counting of votes	29 June

== Parties and alliances ==
The party which won the last election, Gorkha Janmukti Morcha officially didn't fielded any candidates, however its members contested from all 45 seats as independent candidates. On the other hand, Trinamool Congress, the ruling party in the state confirmed that they will contest from only 10 seats. BGPM broke its alliance with TMC and decided to contest from 36 seats on their own. Newly formed Hamro Party also fielded candidates in all seats.

CPI(M) fielded 12 candidates and Congress fielded 5 candidates in the polls. A total of 277 candidates, including 169 independents, are contesting the GTA election. BJP and its allies - Gorkha National Liberation Front, Communist Party of Revolutionary Marxists and All India Gorkha League decided not to contest the GTA election.

Party	Symbol	Alliance	No. of contesting candidates
Independents supported by Gorkha Janmukti Morcha (Gurung) (GJM(G))	IND	None	45
Hamro Party (HP)	IND	None	45
Bharatiya Gorkha Prajatantrik Morcha (BGPM)	IND	None	35
Communist Party of India (Marxist) (CPI(M))		Left Front	12
All India Trinamool Congress (AITC)		AITC+	10
Indian National Congress (INC)		UPA	5
Independents (IND)	None	None	124

== Winning candidates ==
Constituency Number	Constituency Name	Winning candidate	Winning party	Note
Darjeeling Sadar Subdivision
1	Rimbick-Lodhoma	Norden Sherpa	BGPM	
2	Relling-Kaijalia	Satish Pokhrel	BGPM	
3	Pul-Bijanbari-Goke	Bhupendra Chettri	HP	Joined BGPM. Expired on 25 January 2026.
4	Bloomfield-Rishihat	Binoy Tamang	TMC	Joined Congress; expelled from Congress later.
5	Tukver	Suraj Rai	Independent	
6	Lebong-Badamtam	Yogendra Pradhan	BGPM	
7	Phoobsering-Pandam	Jiten Rai	HP	
8	Darjeeling-I	Pratim Subba	HP	
9	Darjeeling-II	Robert Chettri	HP	
10	Darjeeling-III	Ajoy Edwards	HP	
11	Darjeeling-IV	Ruben Das Pradhan	HP	
12	Ghoom-Jorebunglow	Pramoskar Blone	HP	Joined BGPM
13	Chongtong-Marybong-Tamsang	Sandeep Chettri	BGPM	Joined BJP in June 2026
14	Sukhia-Maney Bhanjyang	Uday Dewan	BGPM	
15	Pokhriabong-Chamung	Noel Bomzon	BGPM	
16	Nagari-Dhajia	Anjul Chauhan	BGPM	Resigned from GTA in 2026
17	Rungbull-Dhotria	Rajesh Chauhan	BGPM	Resigned from GTA in 2026
Kurseong Subdivision
18	Sonada-Pacheyang	Anos Thapa	BGPM	Resigned from GTA in 2026
19	Takdah-Glenburn	Sunny Tamang	HP	
20	Takling-Peshok	Mani Kumar Rai	BGPM	Joined BJP in August 2026
21	Takdah-Teesta Valley	Dhendup Pakhrin	BGPM	
22	Mungpoo-Labdah	Ratan Kumar Thapa	BGPM	
23	Seeyok-Gopaldhara-Okaity	Dhurba Bomzon	TMC	
24	Mirik-Thurbo-Duptin	Milesh Rai	TMC	Joined BJP in August 2026
25	Soureni	Arun Sigchi	BGPM	Resigned from GTA in 2026
26	Sukna-Panighatta	Paresh Tirkey	TMC	
27	Tung-St. Mary's	Nuri Sherpa	BGPM	Joined BJP in August 2026
28	Kurseong-Deorali	Shyam Sherpa	BGPM	
29	Kurseong-Giddapahar	Anit Thapa	BGPM	Resigned from GTA in 2026
30	Pankhabari-Ambootia-Longview	Kalpana Pradhan	BGPM	Joined BJP in August 2026
31	Mahanadi-Tindharia	Nowraj Chettri	BGPM	
32	Sittong-Latpanchar	Anit Thapa	BGPM	Resigned from GTA in 2026
Kalimpong Subdivision
33	Chibo-Tashiding	Senora Namchu	BGPM	Joined BJP in June 2026
34	Homes-Bhalukhop	Bikash Rai	Independent	Supported BGPM
35	Bong-Durpin	Suman Gurung	TMC	Joined BJP in June 2026
36	Dungra-Pudung	Palden Tamang	Independent	Joined BJP in May 2026
37	Algarah-Dalapchand	Dawa Tenzi Sherpa	BGPM	Joined BJP in August 2026
38	Lava-Lingsay	Kumar Sharma	Independent	Supported BGPM; joined BJP in June 2026
39	Rongpo-Munsong	Birey Rai	Independent	Supported BGPM
40	Pedong	Kamal Subba	BGPM	Joined BJP in June 2026
41	Gidabling-Nimbong	Sanchabir Subba	BGPM	Resigned from GTA in September 2026
42	Relli-Samthar	Hemant Rai	BGPM	
43	Gorubathan	Ratan Thapa	BGPM	Joined BJP in June 2026
44	Samsing-Kumai	Harkaman Chettri	BGPM	
45	Rongo-Today-Jaldhaka	Lakpa Namgyal Bhutia	BGPM	Joined BJP in June 2026

== Results ==
Ref
Political Party	Seats Won	Net Change in Seats	Vote Share
Independent supported by Gorkha Janmukti Morcha (Gurung)*	2	43 ▼	
Hamro Party*	8	8 ▲	
Bharatiya Gorkha Prajatantrik Morcha*	27	27 ▲	
Communist Party of India (Marxist)	0	-	
All India Trinamool Congress	5	5 ▲	
Indian National Congress(INC)	0	-	
Independent	3	3 ▲	
Total	45		100

" * " denotes parties that are contesting the election as independent candidates (not with any party symbols)

== Aftermath ==
After the election result was out, West Bengal chief minister Mamata Banerjee said that Trinamool Congress had alliance with BGPM. BGPM president Anit Thapa went to meet Mamata Banerjee in Kolkata after a few days.

All 45 elected member took oath on 13 July. BGPM had the majority on their own as they had won 27 seats. BGPM along with its ally TMC, and other three independent members, formed the board. Anit Thapa became the chief executive of GTA while Rajesh Chauhan became its chairman. Their oath taking ceremony took place on 14 July in the presence of Governor Jagdeep Dhankhar.
