= Mathematics in Nepal =

Mathematics in Nepal have been used for measurement since ancient times. Advanced mathematics were used primarily in the field of Astrology to predict position of planets to determine auspicious time for various Hindu rituals. In recent times, mathematics is taught formally in schools from primary level up to doctorate degree. All students must pass mathematics in the SEE exam.

== History ==
The history of mathematics in Nepal is inter-related with the history of mathematics in the Indian sub-continent. However, independent history of mathematics in Nepal also exists. The ancient Licchavi people developed a series of the system for measurement such as Kharika to measure land area and Kosh for measurement of distance. Similarly, Jayasthiti Malla, in 1350 AD standardized Mana and Pathi for volumetric measurement of grains and cereals.

The numerals of Ranjana script was developed in 199 BC. It was used until the mid-20th century in Nepal and India. It is still in use in the Newari language.

=== Formal education ===
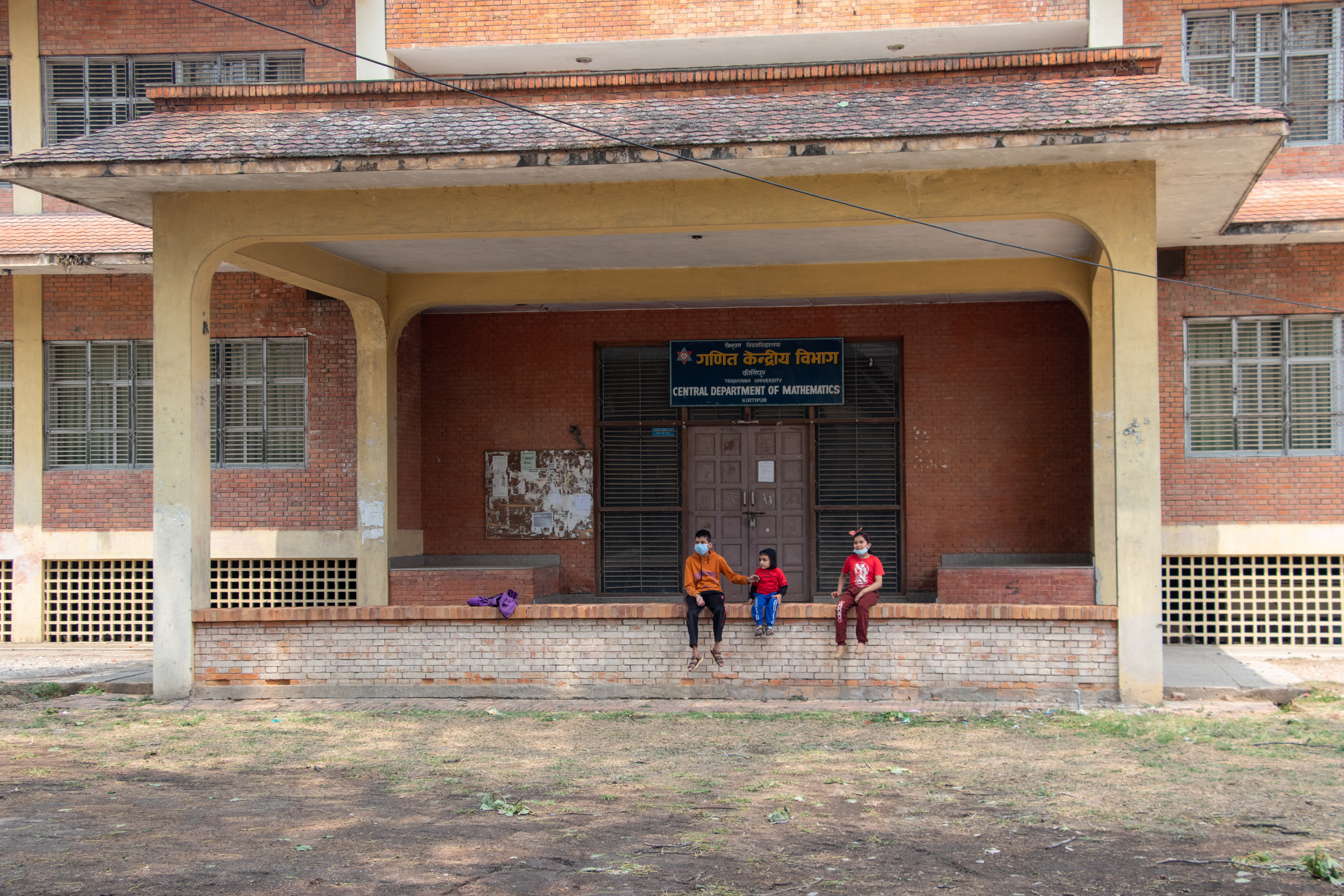
Central Department of Mathematics, Tribhuvan University of Nepal was formed on September 20, 1959 A.D.

In the Rana Period, Kashi (Banaras) used to be the education hub to learn astrology and mathematics. The mathematics was based mainly on the text of Baskaracharya's Siddhant Siromani.

The formal education of mathematics in school started after overthrowing of Rana regime and start of democracy.

The M.A./M.Sc. in Mathematics started on July 14, 1959, and Central Department of Mathematics was formed on September 20, 1959, A.D. in Tripureshwor Bengali mathematician Prof. Asutosh Ganguli was the first head of Department in Master level mathematics courses at Tri-Chandra College.

==== Institutions offering graduate courses ====
- Central Department of Mathematics TU at Tribhuwan University
- Department of Mathematics at Kathmandu University
- Department of Mathematics at Pokhara University

== Notable books ==
- Siddhānta Shiromani of Bhāskara II
- Līlāvatī
- Bijaganita (Algebra)
- Arithmetic by Yadav Chandra Chakravorty
- Geometry of Jagannath
- Wyakta Chandrika by Gopal Pande illustrates the rule of three to the determination of square root and cube roots
- Nepal Arithmetic by Nepal Bhasa Prakasiri Samiti published in 1834

== Notable figures ==
- Chakra Pani Aryal was a 15th-century astrologer and mathematician. He wrote Uttan Gadit (in Sanskrit) that was used for calculation of solar and lunar eclipses. This book was revised by Padma Nav Keshari Aryal in 1934 A.D.
- Pd. Gopal Pandey (1883–1914) was the first person to write a book in Nepali about mathematics. He wrote four editions of his book in Nepali. The third edition was also published in Hindi. He was honoured as the Royal Astrologer for successfully predicting the number of lunar eclipses in 1884. He was also responsible to make the plot of Tudikhel.
- Noor Dutta Pande (second son of Gopal Pande) wrote the Gorkha Bijaganita. He has composed a mathematics book called "Bichitra Ganita".
- Tikaram Dhananjaya (1909–1936) wrote the first full commentary of Lilavati of Bhaskaracharya in Nepali. He also wrote the book Shishubodha Tarangini along with his wife Chandrakala Dhananjaya.
- Chandra Kala Dhananjaya was the first woman writer in mathematics. She wrote a book series called Shishubodha Tarangini, in poetic form. In the second part of the series, Shishubodha Tarangini dosro bhaga, more than 100 mathematical poems were written.
- In 1890 the Rana Prime minister, Chandra Samser was the first Nepali to pass the matriculation examination from the Calcutta University with mathematics.
- Naya Raj Pant (1913–2002) was the first person to graduate in mathematics from Tribhuwan University. He also used his skill in astronomy to decide the historical events.

== See also ==
- Nepal Mathematical Society
