= Hari Prasad Gorkha Rai =

Indian writer

Hari Prasad Gorkha Rai (15 July 1915 – 14 November 2005) was a well-known Indian Nagaland-based Nepali language writer. he was long associated, along with other writers at the time, with two major literary organizations Pashupati Sangh (1929) and Tarun Sangh (1930).

He was an Assamese and was born in the headquarters of the then Naga Hills. From the age of eight years his father started teaching him with his limited knowledge of the Ramayana and Mahabharata, and the Devanagari and Assamese scripts. The highest school education in the Naga Hills was the Kohima Govt. Middle English School. He completed it in the year 1930, securing first division with marks above 80 per cent in all subjects. Thus winning a monthly scholarship of Rs.10/- per month., he joined Jorhat Govt. High School.

He started his career as a teacher. Later he served the All India Radio at Guwahati and Cuttack as Assistant Director. He also translated Birendra Kumar Bhattacharya 1995 novel Lokraj.

== Writing life ==
Influenced by Parasmani Pradhan, He began writing at the age of 17 and has written poems, novels, short stories and essays which appeared in noted Nepali periodicals like Himadri, Gorkha Sewak, Diyalo, Gorkha, Bharati, Katha Dharati, Utthan and Udaya. Describing Hari Prasad Gorkha Rai as one of the pioneers of Nepali literature, eminent Nepali critic Indr Bahadur Rai said:" Most of his contemporary writers have been missing, but he is yet going strong, due to excellence in his writing."

=== Poems ===
His two anthologies of poems Babri (1974) and Manchariko Boli (The voice of Mind 1977) were acclaimed for their simplicity and lucid narration. Babri contains 24 poems of different themes and style such as romantic, patriotic, philosophical, satirical as well as cultural. His poetic insight and charm was directed towards the prevalent political satire. His masterpiece and oft- quoted poem Camp Utthyo throws light on the characteristic sentiments and romantic feeling of an army man. Shri Rai has remarked the significance and sequence of his poetry as ironical and emotional. The racial character and migration from one place to another with deep impression of love and affection left behind have been vividly expressed in his poems . Man Chariko Boli is his second collection of poems where 22 poems of different theme and style of contemporary scene have been included. 'Manchariko Boli' means the voice of the inner mind. In fact some poems express the style of presentation of songs and poems. They are short, simple, humorous, emotional and lyrical. "In my Dream " and "Beautiful World" are the most impressive songs of this collection. He also had the poem On Seeing You / This Flower Is The Witness / On Seeing You In Nepal.

=== Short stories ===
He is a celebrated short story writer in Nepali. His short stories got a concrete shape when his collection Yaha Badnam Hunchu (I am defamed here 1974) was published. It consists of 14 stories of different styles and types among which meri Euti Naga Huki (A Naga Friend of mine) stands outstanding and deserves special mention. Some of the stories in this book are very simple in terms of technique. His short stories have been mostly influenced by the Nagamese social and cultural life. This can be considered as his craftsmanship in the short story writing.

Woman psychology, life of army-men, hazards faced by a traveller, are well depicted in his short story "One pair of birds in the evening". Devastation caused in Kohima during the Second World War and entry of INA in Kohima in the year 1944 have left a deep impression in his mind. This historical facts have also found places in some of his short stories. stories like "Modi" and "Gorkha Model" are other masterpieces where he has expressed his feelings, sentiments and sympathy. The description of natural beauty and environment of Nagaland and description of socio- economic realities of Nepali society are the vital and central themes of Rai's short stories. He has also written a novel captioned 'Himadri'.

=== Plays ===
He has written one-act plays as well mainly for the radio. Among them 'Savitri Satyavan', 'Ek Tukra roti', 'Madan', 'Shiv Parbati', 'Pery Sahab Ko Diary', 'Bank Pass book', 'Din Ra Rat', and 'Santavana ' are widely acclaimed.

== Uttaranchal Anushtan ==
The credit for starting and nurturing the Uttaranchal Anushtan in 1957, a popular Nepali radio programme goes to him. The Government of Assam honoured him by including among the ten recipients of literary pension.

== Awards & Felicitations ==
- 1944 Certificate of Valonv
- 1975 Felicitated by Assom Sahitya Sabha
- 1987 Member, general council, Sahitya Akademi
- 1989 Govt of Assam grants literary pension for life
- 1993 As a member of "Bhane ra po" receives prestigious memento certificate
- 1996 Jagadamba Shree Purasakar granted by Madan Puraskar Guthi
- 1996 Sikkim Sahitya Parishad offers Abhinandan Patra
- 1999 Fulchand Khandel Sanghati Bots Puraskar, Golagaht Asom Sahitya
- 2000 Parasmani Puraskar, Kalimpong Nepali Sahitya Adhyayan Samiti

(Source: Sahitya Akademi, India)
