= Nepali Sahitya Sammelan, Darjeeling =

Nepali literary organisation in Darjeeling

Nepali Sahitya Sammelan
- नेपाली साहित्य सम्मेलन, दार्जिलिङ
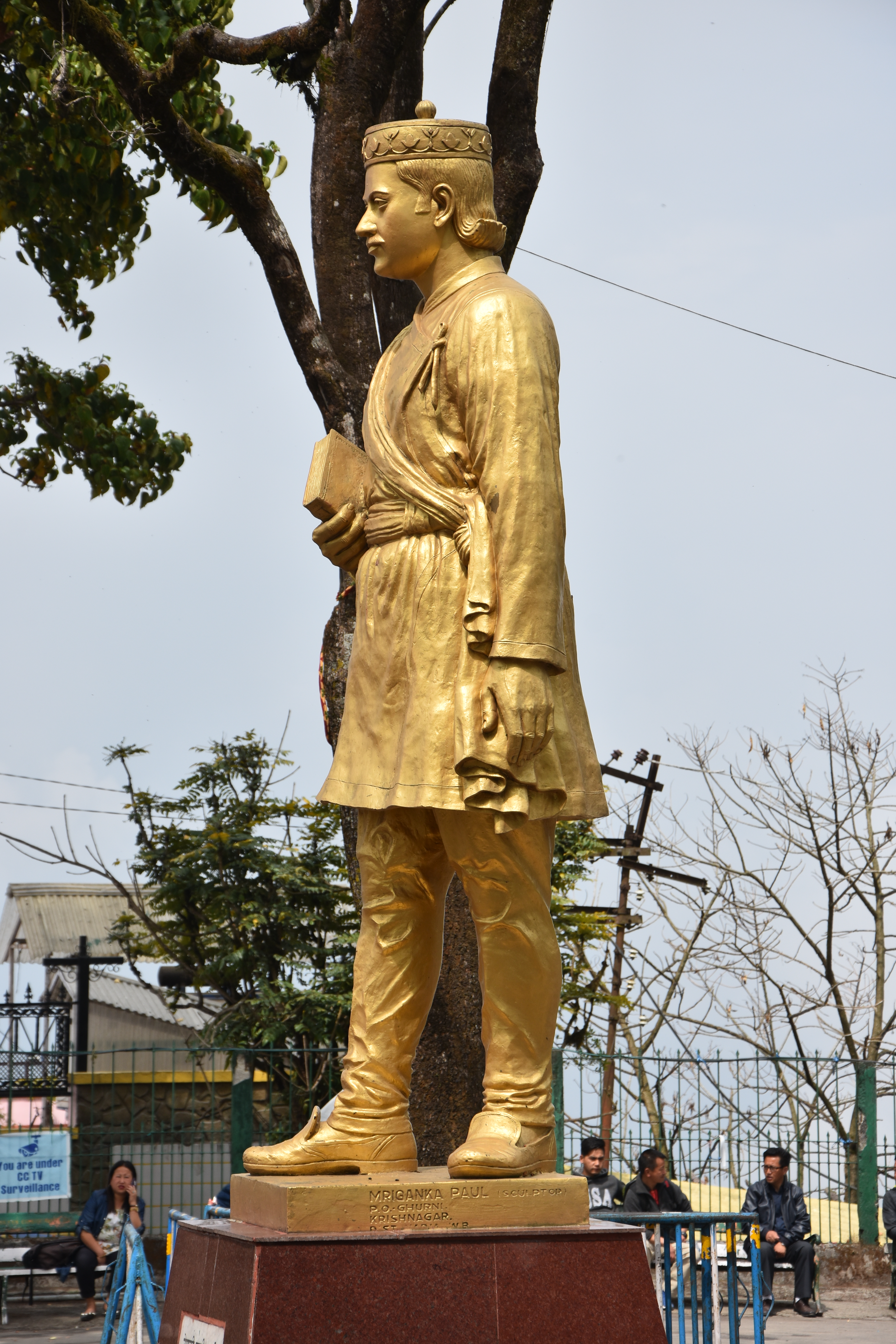
- The statue of the poet Bhanubhakta Acharya in Chaurastha Darjeeling was installed by the organisation in 1996.
- Formation: 25 May 1924; 101 years ago
- Purpose: Preservation, promotion and uplifting of Nepali language
- Headquarters: Darjeeling, West Bengal, India
- Location: Darjeeling, India
- Coordinates: 27.042288301°N 88.26437°E
- Official language: Nepali

Nepali Sahitya Sammelan (Nepali: नेपाली साहित्य सम्मेलन, lit. 'Nepali Literature Conference') is an organisation dedicated to promotion of Nepali literature in India. It was formed on 25 May 1924 in Darjeeling, a Nepali speaking town in West Bengal state of India.

The organisation was awarded with Jagadamba Shree Puraskar for the year 2049 BS (1992-1993), for preservation, promotion and uplifting of Nepali language. The organisation conducts various conferences, publish books and journals and works for the overall preservation of Nepali literature.

== Formation ==
The organisation was formed on 25 May 1924 after a public assembly by eminent Nepali scholars Surya Bikram Gyawali, Dharanidhar Koirala, Parasmani Pradhan as well as other contemporaries. A session was then held on 27 July 1924, outlining the objectives of the organisation.

On the completion of three year of the organisation, Parasmani Pradhan prepared a three-year report listing the history and activities of the organisation. According to the report, in the first three year of the organisation, there were eleven lifetime members and twenty two general members. General membership was provided to those who paid a fee of six rupees annually and lifetime membership of the Nepali Literature Conference was distributed to those who paid a sum of fifty rupees at once. The organisation had members from Nepal, the British India and the United Kingdom. Some of the non Nepali members of the organisation were Kalimpong scholar John Anderson Graham, Brigadier General Charles Granville Bruce of London, as well as Ralph Lilley Turner, professor of Sanskrit at the SOAS University of London.

== Objectives ==
1. To promote and improve Nepali literature.
2. To publish original and/or translated texts in Nepali language.
3. To consider how Nepali literature can be promoted and improved by holding conventions in different places from time to time.
4. To create love for Nepali literature among people by
  1. Publishing books periodically.
  2. Publishing monthly, fortnightly or weekly newspapers.
  3. Conducting debates and lectures periodically.
5. To study different languages and literature of Nepal and to publish the best literature related to it.
6. To study the ancient history, civilization etc. of Nepal and to publish books related to that.
7. To explore the ancient literature of Nepali language.
8. And try to improve the Nepali language by whatever means possible.

== Activities ==
The organisation holds various conferences and literary meetings occasionally. The organisation also organises Bhanu Jayanti, the birth anniversary of Bhanubhakta Acharya, on 13 July every year in Darjeeling with huge fervour.

The organisation installed a bust of Bhanubhakta on 17 June 1949 in the main square of Darjeeling. The installation was one of the first and led to a series of Bhanubhakta's bust and statues being installed all over various parts of Nepal and India. The bust was sculpted by a Norwegian sculptor. The original bust was beheaded on 10 July 1992 by the anti–Gorkhaland faction. A life size statue was then installed in the same place on 13 July 1996 (29 Asar 2053 BS).

The organisation also present various literary awards every year.

== See also ==
- Manipuri Sahitya Parishad
- Sahitya Akademi
