= Tesreau =

Tesreau is a surname. Notable people with the surname include:

- Elmer Tesreau (1905–1955), American college football player
- Jeff Tesreau (1888–1946), American baseball player
- Krista Tesreau (born 1964), American actress

== See also ==
- Tesro Aayam, a literary movement in Nepal and India
