= Bharatiya Gorkha Prajatantrik Morcha =

- Abbreviation: BGPM
- President: Anit Thapa
- Founder: Anit Thapa
- Founded: 9 September 2021 (4 years ago)
- Split from: Gorkha Janmukti Morcha
- Ideology: Gorkha nationalism Regionalism
- Colours: Yellow
- ECI Status: Registered Unrecognised Party
- Alliance: TMC+ (2021–present)
- Seats in West Bengal Legislative Assembly: 0 / 294
- Seats in Gorkhaland Territorial Administration: 29 / 45

Election symbol
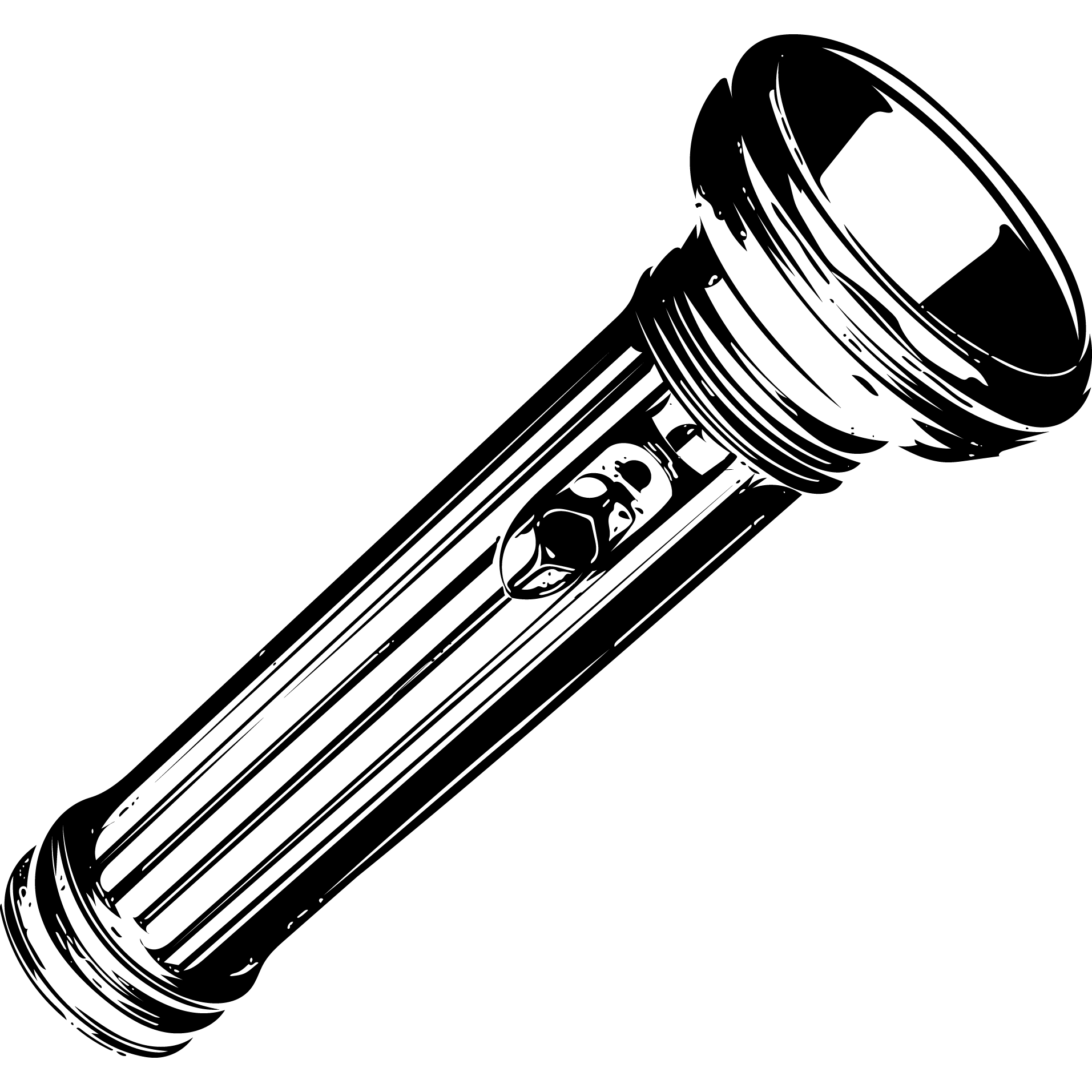

Bharatiya Gorkha Prajatantrik Morcha (BGPM; transl. Indian Gorkha Democratic Alliance) is a political party based in Darjeeling and Kalimpong districts of West Bengal in India. BGPM was founded on 9 September 2021. It is allied with TMC.

== History ==
=== Background ===
After the formation of Gorkhaland Territorial Administration (GTA) in 2011 following the arrival of Trinamool Congress government, elections were conducted in 2012. Gorkha Janmukti Morcha (GJM) contested and won all 45 seats. Later in 2017, the GTA councillors belonging to GJM resigned and burnt copies of the GTA memorandum of agreement and the GTA Act in June 2017, saying that the GTA had failed to fulfill the aspirations of the people.

On 20 September 2017, the Government of West Bengal reconstituted the GTA and appointed rebel GJM leader Binoy Tamang as its chairperson. Before 2019 Darjeeling Assembly bye-election, Tamang became the TMC candidate and subsequently resigned as its chairman. The post was later placed by Anit Thapa, who is also a leader of GJM at that time.

=== GTA Election 2022 ===
On 9 September 2021, Thapa left GJM and created BGPM at Darjeeling Gymkhana. Following the GTA elections in 2022, BGPM allied with TMC. BGPM won all 26 seats out of 45 seats, defeating their rival Hamro Party, becoming the important party in Darjeeling. Following the victory, Thapa became the chief executive of GTA.

=== Subsequent events ===
GJM of Tamang-faction MLA Ruden Sada Lepcha joined BGPM and became the vice-president of the party. BGPM contested the Darjeeling Municipality election in February 2022. It won 9 seats out of a total of 32 seats. Later few of Hamro Party ward coordinators joined the BGPM. Following the victory of no-confidence motion, BGPM forms the government with TMC.

== Electoral Performance ==
West Bengal Legislative Assembly: Election Year / Leader / Poll alliance / seats contested / seats won / +/- in seats / Overall votes / % of overall votes / +/- in vote share / Sitting side; 2026 / Anit Thapa / TMC+ / 3 / 0 / ▼1
