= Dharanidhar Koirala =

Nepali poet (1893–1980)

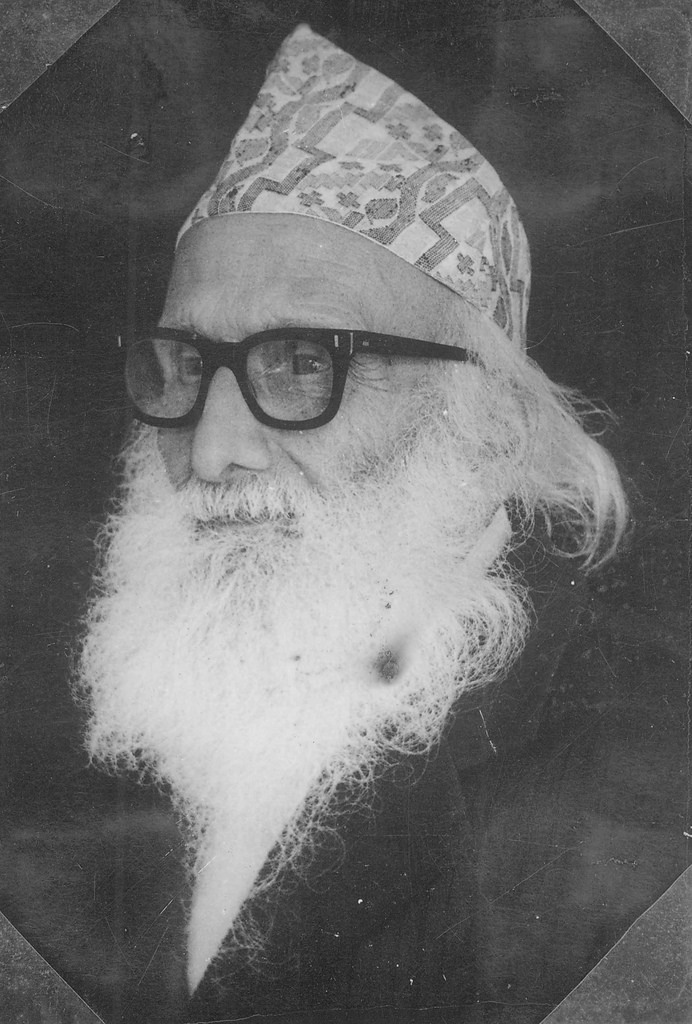
- Born: 1893; Sindhuli, Nepal
- Died: 1980 (aged 86–87); Nepal

Dharanidhar Koirala (Nepali: धरणीधर कोइराला;1893–1980; also known as Dharanidhar Sharma Koirala) was a Nepali poet sometimes known as Pandit-ji.

== Biography ==
Dharanidhar Koirala was born in 1893 in what is now Sindhuli District into a Hindu Brahmin family. He studied Sanskrit and English from Banaras, British India. In Banaras, he saw Indian people promoting their mother tongue which inspired him to "think about Nepal and the Nepali language".

In 1918, he was exiled to India, where Koirala, Surya Bikram Gyawali, and Parasmani Pradhan became known as "SuDhaPa". In 1924, Koirala with Surya Bikram Gyawali, Parasmani Pradhan, Hari Prasad Pradhan, and others established the Nepali Sahitya Sammelan in Darjeeling, British India. The establishment of this organisation was seen as a major event in Nepali literature's history.

Koirala was a key advisor to Sir Ralph Lilley Turner who published Comparative and Etymological Dictionary of the Nepali Language in 1931. He wrote poems about social reforms. In 1978, Koirala was awarded a Doctor of Letters degree by Tribhuvan University. He was also awarded Tribhuvan Pragya Award by Nepal Academy for his contributions to Nepali literature.

Koirala died in 1980. In 1994, the Government of Nepal issued postage stamps featuring Koirala.

== Works ==
- Naibedya (1920)
- Jaga Jaga
- Asha
- Spandhana
