= Saṃśodhana Maṇḍala =

Research Institute for Nepalese Studies

- संशोधन मण्डल
- Formation: 20 September 1952; 73 years ago
- Founder: Naya Raj Pant
- Type: Non-governmental academic organisation
- Headquarters: Dallu Awas Marga, Kathmandu, Nepal
- Coordinates: 27°42′31.22″N 85°17′46.76″E
- Products: Poornima magazine
- Official language: Nepali
- Award: Jagadamba Shree Puraskar

Saṃśodhana Maṇḍala (Nepali: संशोधन मण्डल; lit. Revision Board) is a Nepalese research organisation. The primary work of the organisation is to correct the errors and shortcomings present in existing historical information about Nepal and to interpret information from historical archives. Alongside history, the organisation also researches on various topics related to language, Nepalese culture and Vedic traditions. The organisation was awarded the Jagadamba Shree Puraskar in 2011 (2068 BS).

== About ==
It was established as a group on 20 September 1952 (5 Ashoj 2009 BS) by polymath Naya Raj Pant. When it was formed in 1952, the group had 21 scholars. Their first work was the correction of the information published in Nepal ko Eitihasik Rooprekha by historian Balchandra Sharma, published a year earlier. Gradually, the size of the group reduced to eight. The organisation was formally established in 2018 BS (1961–1962).

After the death of Pant in 2002, his sons Dinesh Raj and Mahesh Raj Pant run the organisation.

The organisation also publishes a magazine called Poornima, once every three months, from 1964 (2021 BS). The organisation was awarded the Jagadamba Shree Puraskar in 2011 (2068 BS) for “their significant contribution towards Nepali literature”.

As of 2019, the organization had only two members Dinesh Raj and Mahesh Raj Pant. According to Mahesh Raj Pant, about 80 per cent of the revision in the information related to Nepalese history is corrected by the organisation.

== Publications ==
- Itihas Sansodhana
- Avilekha Sangraha
- Savadhana Patra
- Vyakaran Sansodhana
- Panchanga Sansodhana
- Nayaraj Panta ko Drishti ma Shree 3 Junga Bahadur Rana
- Poornima magazine
