= Nepal Mathematical Society =

- Formation: 1979
- Headquarters: Kirtipur, Kathmandu
- Members: 500 (life)
- President: Narayan Pahari
- Key people: Parameshwori Kattel (Secretary)
- Website: www.nms.org.np

The Nepal Mathematical Society (NMS) (Nepali: नेपाल गणित समाज) was founded (formally) in January 1979 (Nepali: बिक्रम सम्बत २०३५ माघ ५) by Nepalese mathematicians with the aim of enhancing the academic excellency in studying, teaching, research and applications of mathematics.

== Overview ==
The Nepal Mathematical Society is an association of professional mathematicians dedicated for promotion of mathematical sciences in the country. The society annually published various publications, and held conferences and talk programs at local and national level. The first president the Nepal Mathematical Society is Prof. Dhup Ratna Bajracharya.

== History ==
Establishment of an Institute for enhancing mathematical research and education through sound activities was realized in 2019 B.S. The informal discussion happened between and among the most enthusiastic mathematicians and students of the master's degree program in a picnic program in 2019 B.S. Primarily those parental figures of the institution were Prof. Ashutosh Ganguly, Prof. Krishna Murari Saxena, Prof. Govinda Dev Pant, Prof. Keshav Dev Bhattarai, Prof. Dhup Ratna Bajracharya including the students Ram Man Shrestha, Shankar Raj Pant. The Society attained its legal status in 2035/10/05 B.S.

== Objectives ==
The Nepal Mathematical Society aims:

- To enhance the academic excellency in studying, teaching, research and applications in mathematics.
- To preserve and promote the professional ethics and rights and welfare of teachers and researchers of mathematics.
- To work continuously for promoting mathematics maintaining good relations with the national and international educational and academics.

== Members and membership ==
Nepal Mathematical Society consists of more than 1200 life members around the globe as of data of 2021. The society offers mostly offer life membership along with honorary membership for renowned mathematicians out of Nepal. The life membership can be obtained by paying the fee designated for life membership. To be eligible for the NMS membership, one has to hold a minimum of a master's degree in mathematical sciences or mathematics education.

== Publications ==
The Nepal Mathematical Society publishes the Journal of Nepal Mathematical Society and the Nepal Mathematical Society Newsletter, the society's official newsletter.

== Activities ==
The Nepal Mathematical Society organizes seminars, conferences, trainings every year to promote the studies, teaching and research in mathematics.

== See also ==
- List of Mathematical Societies
- Mathematics in Nepal
