= Batsyayana =

Nepalese cartoonist and painter

- वात्स्यायन
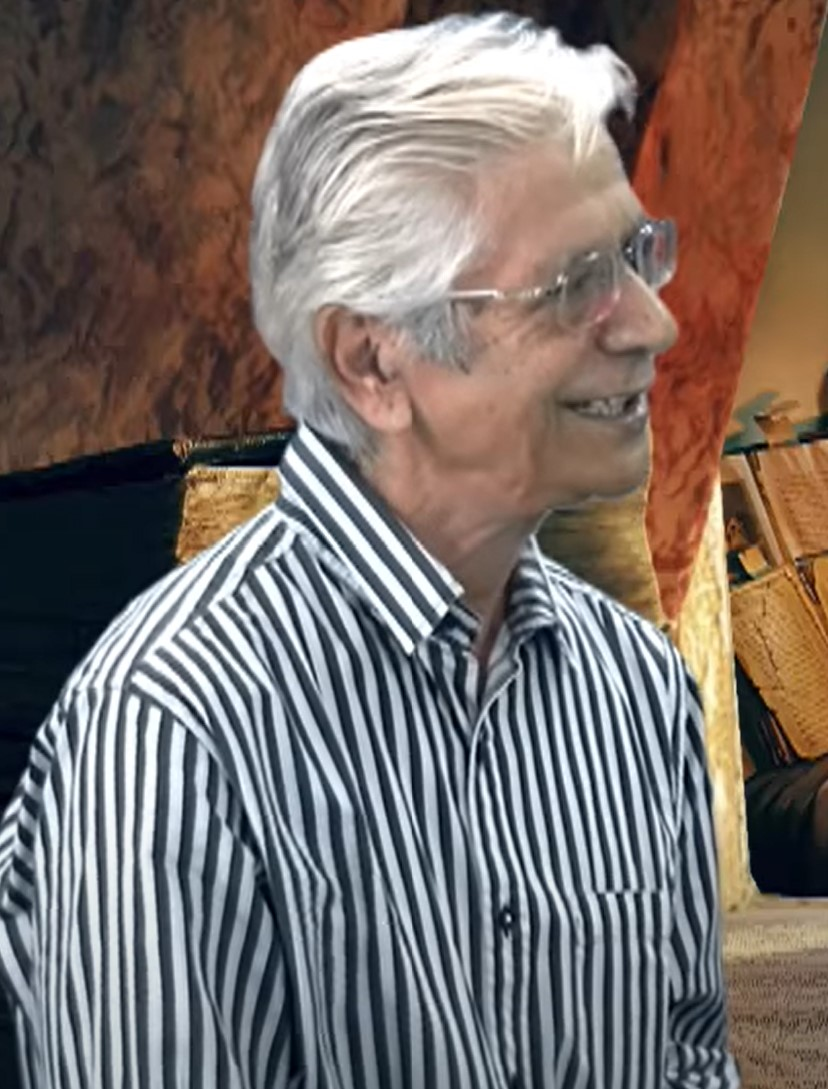
- Born: 1943
- Occupation: Cartoonist, painter
- Awards: Jagadamba Shree Puraskar (2017)

Durga Baral (born 1943), professionally known as Batsyayana is a prominent Nepali political cartoonist and painter.

== Biography ==
Baral is a native of Pokhara, Nepal. Baral was a college teacher and painter when he began drawing cartoons in the 1960s when he was asked to by the publisher of Naya Sandesh. He later said "I took the job of a cartoonist not out of interest, but much like a profession, and simply as a job. I had no idea or knowledge about cartoons. The editor explained to me what and how I was supposed to make cartoons. I made whatever he told me to do and I did it for four years."

Initially he drew comics secretly; he adopted the name Batsyayana, the name of a Hindu sage, because teachers were not allowed to publicly comment on politics. He later said "I could have lost my job, been imprisoned and tortured." Due to media censorship, many of his cartoons were not published.

He drew regular cartoons for the weekly Naya Sandesh from 1964 to 1967. He drew the comic strip Chyangbaa for the literary magazine Prangan from 1977 to 1978. In the 1980s, he drew the strip Aveyentar in Suruchi. In the 1990s, he drew the strip Pale Punya Bahadur for the UNICEF magazine Nawadrishya.

Baral never drew King Birendra or Gyanendra, but frequently commented on the monarchy indirectly. He also frequently criticized the violence of the Maoist insurgents in Nepal. He drew many politicians, including prime ministers Prachanda, Baburam Bhattarai, Madhav Kumar Nepal, Sher Bahadur Deuba, and especially Girija Koirala, depicted with a prominent nose.

One of his most notorious cartoons was published in 2005 and featured Koirala, then an opposition leader, carrying a dead horse labeled "constitutional monarchy" away from a garbage bin. (One commentator later noted this invoked the story of a grief-stricken Shiva carrying the corpse of his consort Sati.) The implication that King Gyanendra had "consigned the constitutional monarchy to the garbage bin" prompted outrage. Narayan Wagle, editor of Kantipur, and Prateek Pradhan, editor of The Kathmandu Post, were arrested. The next day, Kantipur published a statement that concluded "This newspaper affirms its commitment to the constitutional monarchy and democracy." Critics even called for the execution of Baral.

Baral's son Ajit Baral compiled and published a collection of his father's cartoons called Batsyayana and His Barbs: A Cartoonist's Take on Post-1990 Nepal (2006).
