= Ratna Shumsher Thapa =

Nepalese lyricist and poet (1939–2020)

- रत्न शमशेर थापा
- Born: 31 July 1939; Kamalpokhari, Kathmandu, Nepal
- Died: 28 May 2020 (aged 80); Thapathali, Kathmandu
- Education: MA in English literature
- Occupations: Poet, lyricist
- Awards: Jagadamba Shree Puraskar

Ratna Shumsher Thapa (Nepali: रत्नशमशेर थापा; 1939–2020) the legendary lyricist of Nepal, began writing as a poet in 1951. His creations such as Aankhako Bhaka Ankhaile, Swargaki Rani, Kunjama Gunjiyo, Bho Bho Nasodha, Madhumas Yo Dilko and Ye Kanchha Thattaima, Bichodko Pida, Sero Fero Mero have contributed making Narayan Gopal's singing and music everlasting.

Apart from these, his other lyrics such as Yo Kholako Sanglo Pani, Ankhaima Rata Gali, Jati Hansu Bhanchu, Goreto Yo Gaunko, Ghumtima Naau Hai, Fulai Fulko Mausam, and Malmali Ghumto have also contributed to building careers of various musicians and singers across the nation. Though, in the beginning, he had some inclination to playing Tabala and singing, he did not move ahead with these genres. Nevertheless, he remained attached to voice and rhythm via writing songs. Uniquely, Ratna Shumsher also has filled in words after listening to a tune which later became everlasting piece such as Goreto Tyo Gaun Ko and many more.

== Biography ==
Ratna Shumsher Thapa was born on 31 July 1939 (16 Shrawan 1996 BS) in Kamalpokhari, Kathmandu to father Tirtha Shumsher and mother Tula Kumari Thapa.

Ratna Shumsher Thapa died on 28 May 2020 (15 Jestha 2077 BS) in Norvic Hospital, Thapathali, Kathmandu.

== Awards ==
Ratna Shumsher Thapa was felicitated with many prestigious awards including the Jagadamba Shree Puraskar, and the Bhupi Poetry Award.
