= Indra Bahadur Rai =

Indian writer and literary critic

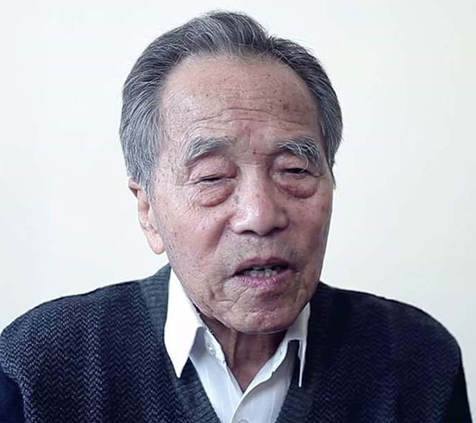
- Born: 3 February 1927; Balasun Tea Estate, Darjeeling District, India
- Died: 6 March 2018 (aged 91); Darjeeling, India
- Occupations: Novelist, Short Story Writer, Essayist, Literary Critic
- Notable work: Aaja Ramita Chha; Raat Bhari Huri Chalyo
- Movement: Tesro Aayam; Lila Lekhan
- Spouse: Mayadevi Rai (died 2017)
- Children: 3 (1 son and 2 daughters)
- Awards: Sahitya Akademi Award, Jagadamba Shree Puraskar, Agam Singh Giri Smriti Puraskar

Indra Bahadur Rai (3 February 1927 – 6 March 2018) was an Indian Nepali language writer and literary critic from Darjeeling, India. He wrote multiple essays, short stories, novels and criticism in his lifetime. Kheer and Raat Bhari Huri Chalyo are some of his most popular stories. He started a literary movement in Nepali literature known as Tesro Aayam with Ishwar Ballav and Bairagi Kainla. In 1977, he won the first ever Sahitya Akademi Award for Nepali language.

== Biography ==
Indra Bahadur Rai did his schooling in Kurseong and Darjeeling. He completed his graduation from Calcutta University and his post-graduation in English from North Bengal University. He taught at Turnbull High School in Darjeeling for several years. He also worked as a professor of English at St. Joseph's College, Darjeeling. He was also the Vice Chairman of Darjeeling Municipality.

== Literature ==
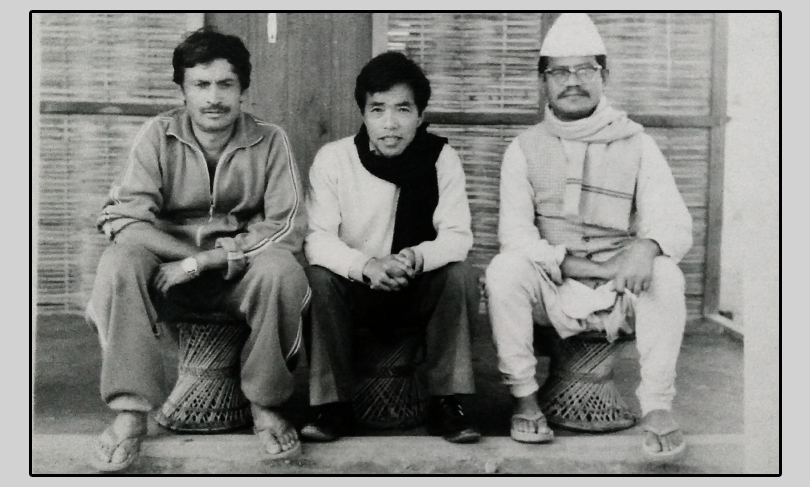
Tesro Aayam Team: Ishwar Ballav, Indra Bahadur Rai and Bairagi Kainla from left.

I.B. Rai entered the field of Nepali literature around 1950 when he started publishing literary criticisms in different journals such as Aadhar, Bharati, Diyo, Diyalo, and Roop Rekha. His first novel Aaja Ramita Cha was published in 1964. After that, he entered the field of short stories. His first story was published in 1959. His first book Vipana Katipaya, a collection of thirty short stories published in 1960, had a great influence on Nepali literature, especially on the genre of short stories. From 1963 onwards, he was a prominent figure in the dimensional literature movement, which is known as Aayameli Andolan in the history of Nepali literature. He, along with Ishwor Ballav and Bairagi Kainla, searched the unexplored realms of Nepali literature. They successfully added a third dimension – Tesro Aayam – to Nepali literature.

One of the most well-known modern authors of Nepali literature, Indra Bahadur Rai's major works are included in the syllabus of many universities for those studying Nepali in India. He had been an active writer for over 60 years and has received the Sahitya Akademi Award (for his work Nepali Upanyaska Adharharu), Jagadambashri Puraskar and Agam Singh Giri Smriti Puraskar. Rai was a very diverse writer and uses a wide range of literary styles that incorporate both traditional as well as modern techniques in his works. The texts he had written dealt with a range of topics, from small private whimsies to key historical events, making each document a unique forceful piece of literature. According to Prem Poddar, the writings of I.B. Rai, which reflect the heritage of the Gorkha/Nepali nation and national identity, can be interpreted in two different ways:

"As I see it, Rai’s reflections on the Nepali language, the Gorkha/Nepali community, and his own writing practice can be read in two ways. The first is in terms of telos: that writing will strengthen the nation or ethnie. The other way is the more troubled interrogative reading that raises the same questions of cultural identity, through textual elisions and ambivalences inter alia, about writing and the Gorkha/Nepali community. I raise the possibility, and vacillate between, both kinds of reading in this introductory essay, but the very act of vacillating veers me towards the latter."

A selection of his short stories were translated into English in 2009 as Gorkhas Imagined: Indra Bahadur Rai in Translation.

== Works ==
I.B. Rai has edited many books and literary periodicals. His most important works are as follows:

- Vipana Katipaya (1961)
- Aaja Ramita Chha (1964)
- Tipeka Tippaniharu (1966)
- Bhanubhaktaka Kriti: Adhyayanharu (1971)
- Kathastha (1974)
- Nepali Upanyaska Adharharu (1974)
- Sandharbhama Ishwarballabhka Kavita (1976)
- Darjeelingma Nepali Natakko Ardhashatabdi (1989)
- Kathaputaliko Man (1992 )
- Pahad Ra Kholaharoo (1992 )
- Arthaharuko Pachhiltira (1994)
- Prishta-Prishtha (1995)
- Samayankan Dainikiya (1997)
- Lekhharu Ra Jhyal (2000)
- Pahenlo Din
- Sahityako Apaharan: Markwadik Pratibadhdata
- Sampurak (2014)
- Indrayan
- Long Night of Storm - short stories translated into English by Prawin Adhikari
- There's A Carnival Today - novel translated into English by Manjushree Thapa

== Personal life and death ==
He was married to Maya Devi Rai till her death on 27 August 2017. They had 3 children- a son and two daughters. He died on 6 March 2018 in Darjeeling.

== See also ==
- Nepali literature
- Sahitya Akademi Award to Nepali Writers
