= Parasmani Pradhan =

Indian Nepali-language writer (1898–1986)

Dr. Parasmani Pradhan
- पारसमणि प्रधान
- Portrait of Pradhan Mani Pradhan
- Born: 1 January 1898; Kalimpong, Bengal, British India (present-day West Bengal, India)
- Died: 2 February 1986 (aged 88); Siliguri, West Bengal, India
- Other name: Prashman
- Occupations: Writer, publisher, poet
- Notable work: Tipan Tapan
- Spouse: Jasmaya Newarni
- Awards: Madan Puraskar

Parasmani Pradhan (Nepali: पारसमणि प्रधान) (1 January 1898 – 2 February 1986) was an Indian Nepali-language writer, poet, translator, grammarian, educator and publisher. He published multiple Nepali language textbooks and played an important role in shaping the modern Nepali grammar. He was one of the key figures who contributed in establishing Nepali as one of the official language of India.

He was a part of a literary group in Darjeeling called SuDhaPa with Surya Bikram Gyawali and Dharanidhar Koirala. The trio played an important role in promoting Nepali language among the Nepali diasporic societies in India.

== Early life and schooling ==
Paras Mani Pradhan was born on 1 January 1898 (18 Poush 1955 BS) in Kalimpong to father Bhagyamani Bhikshacharya and mother Laxmi Maya Newarni. His grandfather Chintamani Shakya migrated to Lalitpur district from Okhaldhunga district. His father with his mother then moved to Kashi in India, at the age of 14 where he met the publisher Pt. Harihar Sharma. His father worked with Pt. Harihar Sharma for few years before moving to Kalimpong and settled there. In Kalimpong his father was popularly known as Julfe Newar.

For his primary education, he was admitted to Pudung Primary School, a Scottish missionary school, 2 miles east of his home. Due to the difficulty of the way to the school in monsoon season, he was shifted to Waugh Primary School. He completed his primary education at Waugh. He was then admitted to Upper Primary School of same mission. After he was punished by the teacher at the school, his mother refused to send him back to the school and admitted him in the night school of his uncle Sri Harkadhoj Pradhan. He then went to Darjeeling with his cousin as a companion, who had won a scholarship to study in a school in Darjeeling. He too was admitted to the Darjeeling Government High School. He passed the Matriculation examination in Hindi medium since Nepali-medium education was not available in Darjeeling and Kalimpong area.

== Literary career ==
He started his literary career by publishing Adhyavasaya, an article in May 1915 issue of Chandra magazine (Year I, Issue 9) published from Benaras. In the next issue of the same magazine, he wrote an essay titled Bidhya. He played an important role in standardising the Nepali grammar. He published multiple books and text books about the Nepali language grammar.

Between 1918 and 1924, he wrote many plays. He wrote and edited about 45 books in his lifetime including Bharatbarshako Itihas, Bilayat Yatra, Nepali Bhasako Utpati ra Bikas, Kabi ra Kabita, Tipan Tapan, etc. He was a part of group called SooDhaPa alongside Surya Bikram Gyawali and Dharanidhar Koirala. The trio played an important role in promoting Nepali language among the Nepali diasporic society in India. In 1924 they founded a literary organization for Nepalese community in India called ‘Nepali Sahitya Sammelan’, which won the Jagadamba Shree Puraskar, The organization also published a literary magazine called Nepali Sahitya Patrika. The trio christend Laxmi Prasad Devkota, Balkrishna Sama and Lekhnath Paudyal as the trimurti (triumvirate) of Nepali literature.

== Personal life and death ==
Parasmani Pradhan

His first wife left him while he was away in Darjeeling for his matriculation exam preparation. He then married Jasmaya Newarni, the daughter of Gopal Singh Malla and Indra Laxmi Malla. They had 12 children. He died on 2 February 1986 in Siliguri.

== Notable works ==
=== Nepali grammar books/coursebooks ===
| Title | Year of publication | Note |
|---|---|---|
| Sajilo Nepali Byakaran | 1932 | |
| Nepali Sajilo Ganit Vol. 1 | 1938 | Maths coursebook |
| Nepali Rachana Kusum Vol. 1 | | Co-authored with Nagedramani Pradhan |
| Nepali Rachana Bharati Vol. 1 & 2 | 1954 | Co-authored with Amarmani Pradhan |
| Nepali Byakaran Bharati | 1954 | Co-authored with Nagedramani Pradhan |
| Prathamik Nepali Byakaran | 1954 | |
| Nepali Muhavara | 1954 | About Nepali phrases |
| Nepali Sajilo Sahitya Vol. 4 | 1955 | |
| Prabesika Byakaran ra Rachana | | Co-authored with Tika Ram Sharma |
| Nepali Bhasa ko Sahitik Bibaran | 1970 | |
| Nepali Byakaranko Paribarddhit ra Bartaman Roop | 1970 | |
| Byakaranko Dantya Katha | 1970 | |
| Nepali Byakaran Vol. I | 1970 | |
| Madhyamik Nepali Byakaran ra Rachana | 1982 | |

=== Nepali translation of novels ===
| Title | Year of publication | Original title | Writer | Original language |
|---|---|---|---|---|
| Hiranmaye Charitra | 1916 | Yugalanguriya | Bankim Chandra Chatterjee | Bengali |
| Bilayat Yatra | 1919 | Bilayat Yatra | Gajadhar Singh | Hindi |

=== Plays (written between 1918 and 1924) ===
- Sawitri Satyawan
- Sundar Kumar
- Harishchandra
- Ratnawali
- Bidhya Sundar
- Chandra Gupta
- Sita Banbas
- Buddha Charitra Natak
- Mahabharat Natak

=== Non–fiction ===
- Nepal Prathamik Bhugol Vol. I & II (Geographical nonfiction, 1933/46)
- Prathamik Shiksha Bidhi (1942)
- Nepali Hamro Matribhasa (Essay, 1953)
- Nepali Bhasa ko Utapatti ra Bikas (1961)
- Bharat ko Itishas (Ketaketiko) (1961)
- 108 Amar Jiwai Vol. I & II (Biographies, 1964)
- Tipan Tapan Vol. I (Essays, 1969)
- Rochak Sanmaran (Essays, 1969)
- Panch Paurakhi Purusha Ratna (Biographies, 1969)
- Nepali Sahitya ko Saun Akshar (Essay, 1969)
- Afno Barema 1 (Autobiography, 1971)
- Kwanti (1972)
- Aathau Anushuchi ma Nepali Bhasa (transl. Nepali Language in Eighth Schedule, 1972)
- Sarkari Kamkaj Garna Bidhi (1973)
- Kathe Jhanki (Essay, 1974)
- Ramailo Samjhana Kharsang ko (History of Kurseong, 1978)
- Mahakabi Laxmi Prasad Devkota (Biography of Laxmi Prasad Devkota, 1978)
- Kabi Shiromani Lekhnath Paudyal (Biography of Lekhnath Paudyal, 1979)

=== Short stories ===
- Maya ko Chiya
- Katha Bharati Jetho Bhag (1953)
- Katha Bharati Mahilo Bhag (1954)
- Katha Bharati Sahilo Bhag (1955)
- Katha Bharati Kahinlo Bhag (1956)
- Sadhe Saat Katha (1974)

=== Poems ===
- Prasnottar (Bhanubhaktiya) (1949)
- Kabi ra Kabita (1957)
- Jaymala (1972)
- Kathmandu ma Dash Din (1975)

== Awards and legacy ==
In 1969, he won the Madan Puraskar, Nepal's highest literary honour, for his book Tipan Tapan. The same year, Pradhan was also awarded with the Tribhuvan Puraskar for the book Pancha Paurakhi Purush He was conferred with the Degree of Doctor of letters (Honoris Causa) by the Tribhuwan University in June 1975 and the Degree of Doctor of Literature (Honoris Causa) by the University of North Bengal in April 1981. In 1983, he was awarded the Ratna Shree Subarna Padak by Ratna Shree Patrika, Kathmandu for his article Maile Chineko Samaj.

His biography titled Dr. Parasmani Ko Jiwan Yatra was written by his son Nagendramani Pradhan. The book won the prestigious Sahitya Akademi award for Nepali language in 1995. An award in his name Parasmani Pradhan Puraskar is awarded annually by Nepali Sahitya Adhyan Samiti.

== See also ==
- Surya Bikram Gyawali
- Dharanidhar Koirala
