= Shanta Das Manandhar =

Nepali author (1934–2023)

- शान्तदास मानन्धर
- Born: 1934; Kathmandu, Nepal
- Died: 14 November 2023 (aged 89); Kathmandu, Nepal
- Occupation: Writer
- Awards: Jagadamba Shree Puraskar, Balsahitya Prabardhan Puraskar, Aviyan Sahitya Puraskar, Balhitkari Puraskar, Hridayachandrasingh Smriti Samman, Devkota Balsahitya Puraskar

Shanta Das Manandhar (Nepali: शान्तदास मानन्धर; 1934 – 14 November 2023) was a Nepalese pioneer of children's literature. He published more than 24 children's books. Two of the books were published in English in 1958–1959, one of them titled Some Essays. He also translated English fairy tales into Nepali.

Manandhar was born in Jhochen, Kathmandu and educated in JP school till, and completed the Bachelor level. He worked as a teacher in Santi Bidyagriha of Lainchaur and worked as a principal in Bal Sewa Bidhyashram for eight years. Though he suffered from two heart attacks, he remained active in writing for various newspapers for children's columns.

Shanta Das Manandhar died at Vayodha Hospital in Kathmandu, on 14 November 2023, at the age of 89.

== List of awards ==
- Jagadamba Shree Purasakar in 2018
- Devkota Lu Xun Pragya Puraskar in 2018
