= Bairagi Kainla =

Nepalese poet and writer

- वैरागी काइँला (Nepali) ᤋᤡᤗ ᤒᤡᤡᤡᤁᤪᤔ ᤏᤣᤶᤒᤠᤅ ᤗᤡᤶᤒᤢ (Limbu)
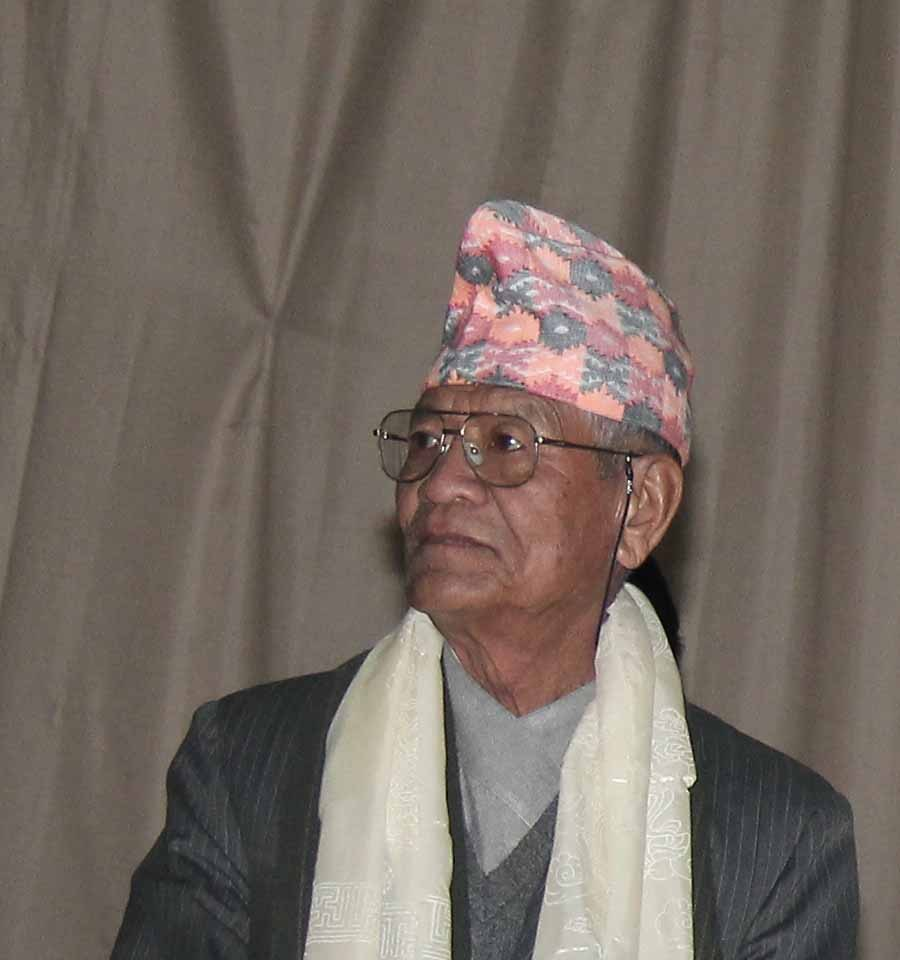
- Born: Til Bikram Nembang Limbu; August 9, 1939 (age 86); Pauwa Sartap, Panchthar, Nepal
- Education: Bachelor of Arts
- Alma mater: Calcutta University
- Occupations: Poet, Former Chancellor of Nepal Academy
- Movement: Tesro Aayam
- Spouse: Dev Kumari Nembang Limbu
- Children: 1 daughter
- Parent(s): Kharga Bahadur Nembang Limbu (Father); Saraswati Nembang Limbu (Mother)
- Relatives: 7 brothers, 6 sisters
- Awards: Sajha Puraskar; Jagadamba Shree Puraskar

Til Bikram Nembang Limbu, professionally known as Bairagi Kainla or Bairagi Kaila, is a Nepalese poet and litterateur. He has served as Chancellor of the Nepal Academy from 2009 (2066 BS) to 2013 (2070 BS). Part of his significant literary struggle was the Tesro Aayam (Third Dimension) movement. During the early 1960s, he, along with Ishwor Ballav and Indra Bahadur Rai, searched unexplored realms of Nepali literature and added a new dimension – the third dimension – to Nepalese literature.

He is currently working in the field of Folklore of Limbu ethnic people of Eastern Nepal. He is also working to promote the culture, language and literature of the minor communities, nationalities and indigenous people of Nepal. Bairagi Kainla was nominated as a member of the Royal Nepal Academy in 1990.

== Early life and education ==
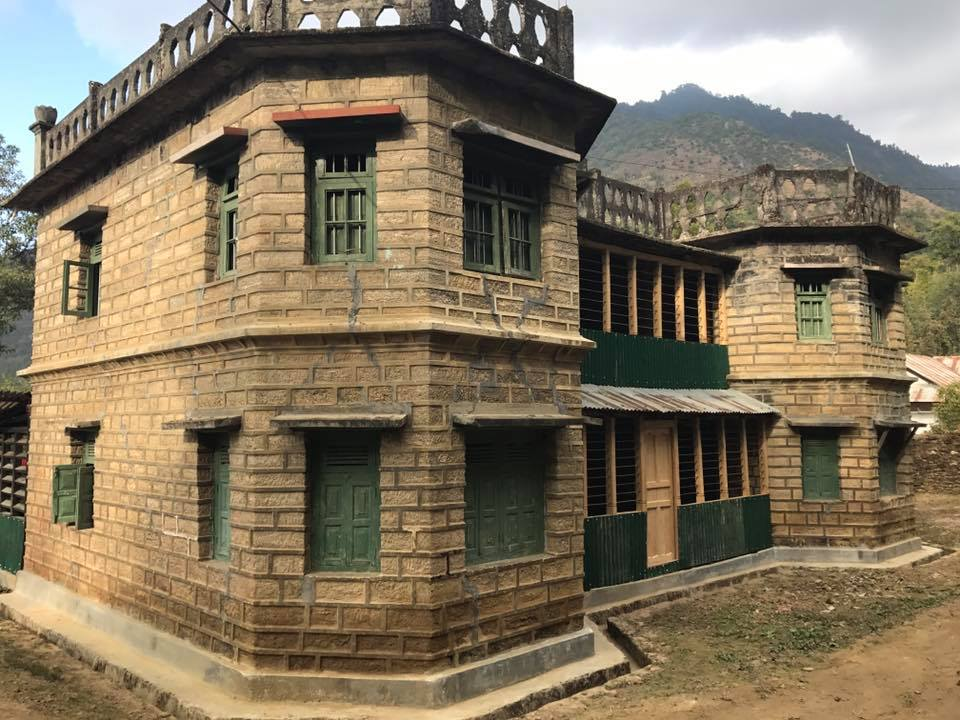
Bairagi Kainla's house, known as Building Ghar, Kainla's Birthplace, in Panchthar

Bairagi Kainla was born in 1939 and learnt his first letters at home. He was taught by local teachers. He lived in a joint family and his father had six wives. Kainla's father was quite ahead of his times. He was liberal enough to send him to study Science in Darjeeling. But more than formal studies, Kainla became busy in literary programmes.

In Darjeeling, Kainla met Indra Bahadur Rai and Ishwar Ballav in college whose encouragement became pivotal in shaping his poet-personality. These trio's incessant debates on writing incited the publishing of their magazine titled Phool Paat Patkar where they published poetry, essays and short stories.

Born in joint family, Kainla grew up with eight brothers and six sisters. Always having someone around him was the best part of having grown up in big family, Kainla remembers. He also remembers that the sad part of big family was that the women in the family had to wake up around four o'clock in the morning and start their daily chores.

He recalls that his father was among the first of Limbu to emphasize education and he had sent his children far away from home for further studies. His father had also published the first Limbu lyrical poetry Kirat Mikhan Samlo (Kirat Jagaran Geet) which was later transliterated to Devanagari by Kainla in 2038 BS.

In conversation with Para Limbu, Chairperson of Spiny Babbler, he said,

"When I was born in Pauwa Sartap Village of Panchthar, my elder brothers had already moved down to Ilam and attended school. Once on their visit home during Dashain (a major festival celebrated in Nepal), I consulted my brother Bhuwani Bikram and we decided I should run away and stay with them.

About this time, they were staying with our mawali, mother’s place in Ilam. There was a river, Nibhu Khola, two to three kilometers away from our house, where we had a cowshed. One day I was given the task of taking salt to our cattle. I took off with the bamboo pipe containing the salt, and reached the riverside. I think I was about seven or eight years old. From there I began running all the way towards Ilam. Back home, they found out about my escape and sent an old Tamang to get me back. He met me along the way at Raksyhey, but I refused to return home with him.

I reached Ilam and settled down with my brothers. I remember when I started school, the year was 1947. Gandhi died that year."

He studied Science and completed Intermediate of Science (ISc) from Darjeeling Government College affiliated to Calcutta University.

== Career ==
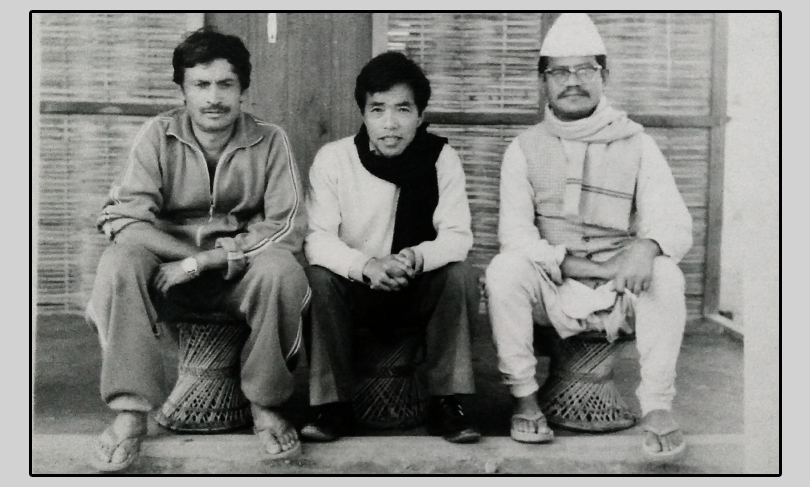
Tesro Aayam Team: Ishwar Ballav, Indra Bahadur Rai and Bairagi Kainla from left.

=== Beginning ===
Bairagi Kainla's poetical works began since the early 1960s while he was a young student in Darjeeling. During the time, hand written magazines were popular as printing was costly. Kainla published lot of his work in them.

=== The Third Dimension (Tesro Aayam) ===
Kainla met Indra Bahadur Rai and Ishwor Ballav in college in Darjeeling, whose encouragement became pivotal in shaping his poet-personality. Their incessant debates on writing incited the publishing of their magazine Phool Paat Patkar with their pocket money where they published poetry, essays and short stories.

Kainla formed a trio with Indra Bahadur Rai and Ishwor Ballav who came like a thunder with new literary trend and a powerful movement called Tesro Aayam (The Third Dimension). In 1963 AD, Kainla, Rai and Ballav first experimented with Tesro Aayam writing. They started the Aayameli movement from Darjeeling with the publication of a journal titled Tesro Aayam triggering a theoretical jolt in Nepali literature at the time.

Kainla did not write much, whatever he wrote he did most powerfully. He hails from Limbu community of eastern Nepal. He uses local myths and lore in his poetry leading to a diversion in traditional writing. Kainla's poetry is the song of freedom. He is a great freedom-fighter and participated actively in different movements. Deep undertone of love and revolt can be heard in his work. His poems of Bairagi kainlakaa Kavitaharu contains some masterpieces in Nepali.

=== Chancellor of the Nepal Academy ===
Kainla served as Chancellor of the Nepal Academy from 2066 BS to 2070 BS.

== Works ==
Long time ago, my love, I promised I would take you dancing by starlight, take you to a dream-like paradise, feed you the drink of immortality, make us unforgettable history.

All of this was mistake, perhaps. I even promised eternal youth. Menaka-like.

I can now tell you I come from the soil. I come from a flower. I can buy you a sari, feed you in restaurants, and walk to the crossings with you.

I can be true to you, I can be loyal to you, my love, I can love you while I live.

You see, flying towards Heaven, I had forgotten to climb the stairs to my house. Dreaming of immortality I had nearly forgotten to live.

I made the earth cry, insulted human heart. But now I can say confidently, I come from the soil. I come from a flower.

My love, I can make you the woman of the poet’s pen, I can make you the mother of a king like son, I can accept defeat, I can love, I am human, I can be human – for you. I can love you, protect you as long as I live.

Look in my eyes, I bring to you my love’s new edition. I emerge from the ashes of my past and here, in my eyes, sparkling like my new poetry collection, like the fresh flowers you have on the table this morning, I bring to you my love’s new edition.

And it is here, in these eyes, that you find me and I find you every time.

— Bairagi Kainla's Poem My Love’s New Edition from Bairagi Kailakaa Kavitaharu (वैरागी काइलाका कविताहरु)

=== Publications ===
- Bairagi Kainlaka Kavitaharu, Sajha Prakasan, Bikram Samvat (B.S.) 2031/1974
- Sappok-Chomen:Limbu Jatima Kokh-Puja, Nepal Academy, B.S.2048/1991
- Nahen Mundhum:Irsya ra AankhiDahiko Aakhyan ra Anusthan, B.S 2051
- Samsogha Mundhum:Pretatmako Aakhyan ra Anusthan, B.S. 2051
- Sasik Mundhum: Moch-Marne Akhyan ra Anusthan, B.S. 2052
- Tongsimg Tokma Mundhum:Akhyan ra Anusthan, B.S. 2052
- Nawacoit Mundhum, B.S. 2060
- Andha Manchheharu ra Hatti, B.S. 2068
- Mujingna Kheyongna Mundhum, B.S. 2070
- Lahadongna-Suhampheba Mundhum, B.S. 2070
- Pajaiba Mundhum, B.S. 2070
- Khappunama Mellonghangma nu Luplinama Wadannama Mundhum, B.S. 2070
- Namsami-Kesami Mundhum, B.S. 2070

=== Translation: poetry ===
- Kirat Jagaran Geet (Limbu Lyrical Poetry) by Subba Kharga Bahadur Nembang Limbu, B.S. 2038

=== Edited: prose ===
- Limbu Bibliography, Royal Nepal Academy, B.S. 2050
- Limbu Bhasa Tatha Sahitya Vichar Gosthi, Royal Nepal Academy, B.S. 2050
- Rastriya Bhasako Kavita Sangalo ( with A Yonjan), Royal Nepal Academy
- Limbu Folktales (as a guest editor) in Saipatri, Royal Nepal Academy

=== Co-writing ===
- Limbu Grammar, Yakthung Huppan-लिम्बू ब्याकरण

=== Magazine and journal editing ===
- Tesro Aayam (Monthly), Darjeeling, A.D. 1963
- Kavita (Quarterly), Royal Nepal Academy
- Limbu Language and Literature, A Tri-Lingual Journal, Since A.D. 1993

== Social activities ==
- Former member, Royal Nepal Academy (BS 2047-2056 /AD 1991-1999)
- Former member, Linguistic Society of Nepal (Life Member)
- President, Society for the Development of The Limbu Language, Literature and Culture
- Vice president, Nepal Center for Contemporary Studies (NCCS), Nepal
- Former member, Nepal National Ethnographic Museum
- Member, Folklore Society of Nepal
- Member, Ganeshman Singh Academy. Nepal
- Convenor, National Language Policy Advisory Committee, HMG, (BS 2050/AD 1993)
- Member, National Cultural Policy Recommendation Committee, HMG, (BS 2048/AD 1991)
- Member, Recommendation Committee for News Broadcast in Some National Languages of Nepal, HMG
- Coordinator, Education For All, NNPA, Thematic Group on Indigenous Peoples and Linguistic Minorities, HMG, 2002
- Life member, Royal Nepal Academy
- Chairman, Sajha Prakashan Nepal (2004)
- President, Democratic Creators United Forum, Nepal BS 2063
- Former advisor, NEFEN
- Advisor Kirat Yakthung Chumlung ( KYC)

== Literary awards ==
- Sajha Puraskar, B.S. 2031
- Medals: Gorkha Dakshin Bahu (Second Class), B.S. 2051
- Yuga Kavi SiddiCharan Puraskar, B.S. 2052
- Harihar Shastri- Sabitri Devi Sahitya Puraskar, B.S. 2058
- Shri Krishna Kumari Manorath Smriti Puraskar, B.S. 2060
- Aadivasi Greeti Samman - B.S. 2063
- Madhuparka Samman, B.S. 2065
- Vishist Shrasta Samman, B.S. 2066 (Nari Sahitya Pratishthan, Kathmandu)
- Iman Singh Chemjong Sahitya Puraskar, Sikkim, India, 2011
- Jagadamba Shree Puraskar, 2075 BS
