= Ali Miya =

Nepalese poet (1919 - 2006)

Lok Kavi Ali Miya
- अलि मियाँ
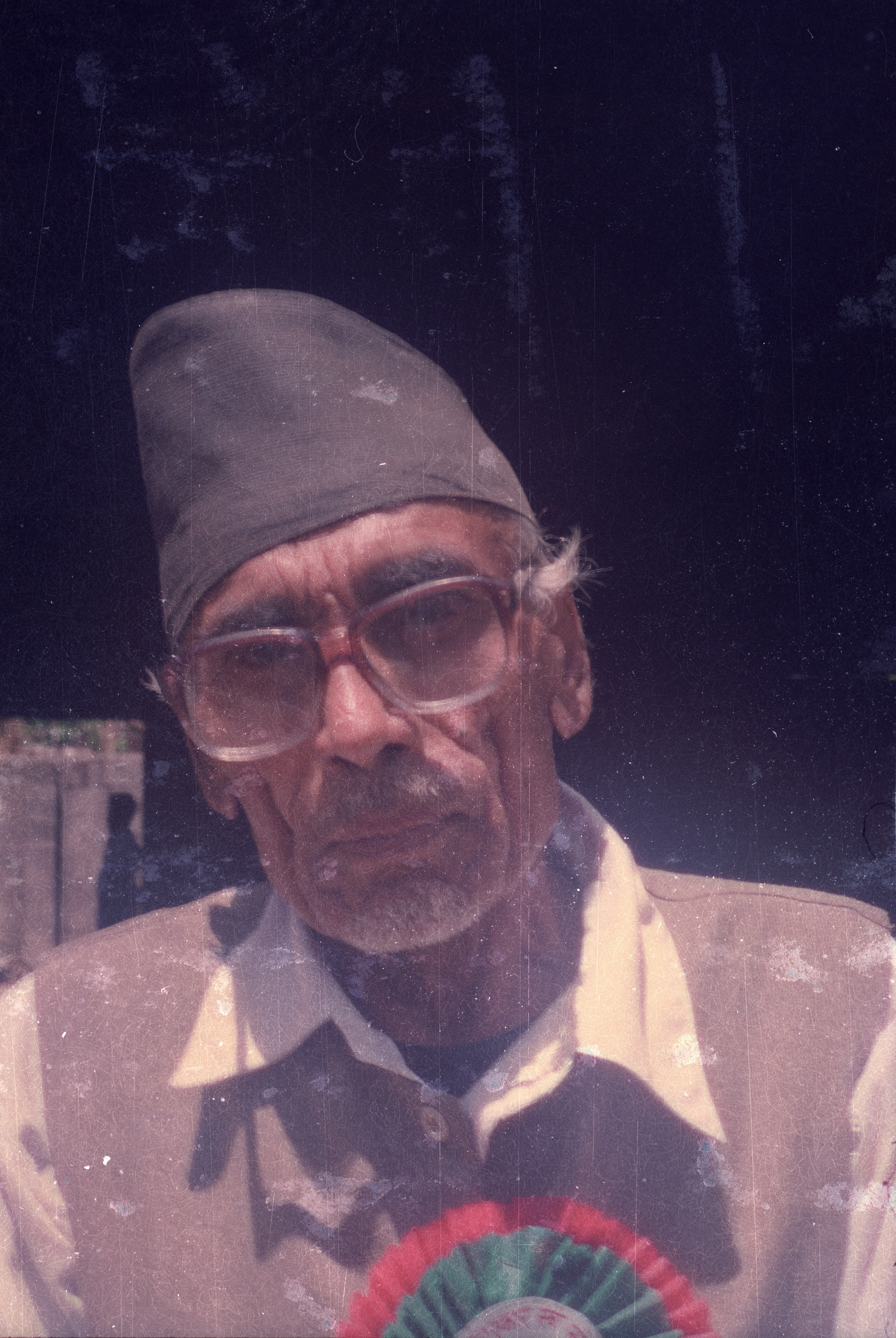
- Ali Miya in 1988
- Born: 26 February 1919; Pokhara, Nepal
- Died: 4 August 2006 (aged 87); Kaski, Nepal
- Occupation: Folk poet
- Awards: Jagadamba Shree Puraskar, 2060 BS

Ali Miya (Nepali: अलि मियाँ; 26 February 1919 – 4 August 2006) was a Nepalese folk poet. He was popularly known as "Lok Kavi".

== Early life ==
Miya was born on 26 February 1919 in Pokhara, Nepal to father Din Mohammad and mother Jahuran Miya. He was one of the two surviving children of his parents who had thirteen children. He lost his mother when he was 18 months of age and his father at the age of two. He was raised by his brother and sister in law.

He joined the British army during the second world war at the age of 18. After five years in army, he returned home.

He only became literate at the age of 21.

== Works ==
- Biraktalahari (1949)
- Nepali Jhyaure Geet Sangraha (1954)
- Nyauni ko Pukara
- Pahad ko Suskera
- Seti ko Suskera (1972)
- Ujyalo Bhaisakyo (1982)
- Samjhana ko Diyo (1994)
- Ali Miyan ko Awaz (2001)

== Awards ==
The awards won by Ali Miyan are:

- Indra Rajya Laxmi Pragya Puraskar (1991)
- Shiromani Puraskar (1994)
- Kumudini Kala Tatha Sahitya Puraskar (1995)
- Narayan Gopal Sangeet Puraskar (2001)
- Jagadamba Shree Puraskar (2003)

== Personal life ==
He was married four times. He met Kulu, his first wife during a Dohori competition at Bhirkot. They separated. He then married Nooran Nisha with whom he had a son named Hanif Miya. Nooran died at the age of 18. He then married Umadh Nisha, Nooran's sister who also died at the age of 21. He then married Nani from Baglung whom he meet during a Dohori competition too.

Miya adhered to Islam but was respectful of all different religions. He even used to receive tika during Dashain form Hindu people and knew the shlokas of Ramayana and Mahabharata by heart. He had seven children. He died on 4 August 2006 and he was buried in Jayakot, Kaski, Nepal.

== Ali Miya Lok Bangmaya Samman Puraskar ==
In the honor of the poet, every year an award named Ali Miya Lok Bangmaya Samman Puraskar (Ali Mian Folk Literature Honor Award) is given to individuals who have made notable contributions to folklore in Nepal, including folk music and folk literature by Ali Miya Lok Wangmaya Pratisthan (Ali Miya Folklore Academy ).
