= Angur Baba Joshi =

Nepali social activist (1932–2020)

- अङ्गूरबाबा जोशी
- Joshi during graduation
- Born: Angur Baba Panth; 15 August 1932; Dilli Bazar, Kathmandu, Nepal
- Died: 20 June 2020 (aged 87); Kathmandu
- Education: Oxford University
- Occupations: Educator, Social activist
- Spouse: Dr. Bal Ram Joshi
- Parent(s): Mr. Pitamber Prasad Panth and Mrs. Deep Kumari Panth

Angur Baba Joshi (née Panth; 15 August 1932 – 20 June 2020) was a Nepali social activist and the first Nepalese woman principal. Joshi died in 2020 in Kathmandu, Nepal, aged 87. She is widely renowned as a progressive figure in Nepal's education system, particularly for her role in women's empowerment in education with education policies and schemes.

== Early life ==
She was born on 15 August 1932 at Dilli Bazar, as daughter of Mr. Pitamber Prasad Panth, and Mrs. Deep Kumari Panth. Joshi was betrothed (in a time when early marriages were still the norm) at the age of 11 to the future Professor Dr. Bal Ram Joshi, who was just 12 then. She had one son, Kiran, and two daughters, Prava and Jyoti.

== Education field ==
After returning from England, where she graduated from Oxford University, she started her career as the principal of Padma Kanya College, the first women's college in Nepal, from 1953 until 1973. She was the first woman in Nepal to work as a school administrator.

== Awards ==
- Jagadamba Puraskar (2014)
- Gorkha Dakshin Bahu, II class
- Trishakti Patta, III class
- Mahendra Vidya Bhushan, I Class

== See also ==
- Godawari Vidhya Mandir
- Rangu Souriya
