= Kedar Man Vyathit =

Nepali poet (1914–1998)

- केदारमान व्यथित
- Young Kedar Man Vyathit
- Born: Kedar Man Shrestha; Oct/Nov 1914(Kartik 1971 BS); Bansbari, Sindhupalchok, Bagmati
- Died: 10 September 1998 (aged 83–84); TU Teaching Hospital, Maharajgunj, Kathmandu
- Education: 3rd grade
- Occupations: Poet; Activist; Politician
- Spouse: Jyotsana Pradhan (c. 1932–unknown)
- Children: 10 (6 sons, 4 daughters)
- Parents: Suryaman Shrestha (father); Padma Kumari Shrestha (mother)
- Writing career
- Pen name: Vyathit
- Language: Nepali; Newar; Hindi
- Years active: c. 1939–1998
- Period: c. 1946–c. 1983
- Notable awards: Vednidhi Puraskar; 1989-90; Jyotirmaya Trisaktipatta– First class year unknown Jagadambashri Puraskar year unknown Gorkha Dakshinbahu– First class year unknown

Founding secretary of Nepali Citizens Rights Committee
- In office c. 1940 CE – unknown

Minister of Transport and Communications
- In office 1962–unknown
- Monarch: Mahendra

Chancellor of Royal Nepal Academy
- In office unknown–unknown
- Preceded by: King Mahendra

Minister of Home Affairs
- In office c. 1979–unknown
- Monarch: Birendra

Founding secretary of Nepali Literature Institute
- In office 1962 – c. 1964

President of Nepali Literature Institute
- In office c. 1964–unknown

Kedar Man Vyathit (Nepali: केदारमान व्यथित; 1914–1998) was a Nepali poet of Nepali, Newar and Hindi languages. Educated up to the third grade, he started out as an employee of a timber godown, but later co-founded Nepali Citizens Rights Forum with Sukraraj Shastri. Sentenced to 18 years for treason by the Rana regime in 1997 BS (1942 CE), he was tutored in poetry by Siddhicharan Shrestha in prison. After the fall of the Ranas, he grew close to the monarchy, becoming a member of King Tribhuvan's Adviser Assembly, and, later, cabinet minister during both King Mahendra and King Birendra's reign. He was confined to bed for a number of his final years, having injured himself in a fall.

He published at least 23 volumes of poetry— sixteen in Nepali, and four each in Newari and Hindi. His poems are usually written in metrical verse and are very brief, rarely exceeding a page in length. His early poems are melancholic, pessimistic or revolutionary, in keeping with his incarceration during a time of revolution against the tyranny of the Ranas. His later poems have themes of human love including some eroticism, and natural beauty. He played a pivotal role in the development of Nepali literature, both as a central figure of a literary generation that transitioned it from a more Sanskritic Hindu tradition to a modern one, and through his organisational activities, chief among them, a series of national and international literary conferences.

== Life ==
=== Childhood and youth ===
Vyathit was born Kedar Man Shrestha, in Kartik, 1971 BS (Oct–Nov, 1914), to father Suryaman and mother Padma Kumari Shrestha, in a village called Baune Pati or Banaune Pati, in Bansbari of Sindhupalchok District in east-central Nepal. As an infant, he was taken to his maternal uncle/grandparents' home in Syangja, where he was raised for four years before being moved again, to be raised in Kathmandu. He dropped out of school after passing the third grade, and worked in a timber godown.

Around the age of 18, he married Jyotsana Pradhan, daughter of Chakrasundar and Shivamaya Pradhan. He had 10 children with her— six sons and four daughters.

=== Before the 1951 revolution ===
He was the founding secretary of Nepali Citizens Rights Committee that he co-founded with Sukraraj Shastri. On 2 Kartik 1997 BS (October 1940 CE), he was charged with treason and sentenced to 18 years in prison with seizure of all his property. While in prison, Siddhi Charan Shrestha helped him develop his poetry. He continued his political activism in prison. He sat on a hunger strike for 21 days demanding improvements in living conditions for the prisoners. He was released in 1945. The same year, he convened Nepal's first literary conference. In 2003 BS (1946-47 CE), he had significant involvement in the establishment of Nepali Literary Council. He then went to India to join the democracy activists there. In India, he joined the Nepali National Congress, and was nominated a member of the Central Struggle Committee. He was accused in the Jharokhar Shooting Incident of Rautahat; he was arrested by Indian Police upon request from the Rana regime. BP Koirala convinced Jawaharlal Nehru to not extradite him, and so he was imprisoned in Bihar jail instead. After 18 months of jail, he was released by the request of the government following the establishment of democracy in Nepal.

=== After 1951 ===
Vyathit was nominated a member of King Tribhuvan's Advisor Council. He founded the Leftist Congress under his own chairmanship following an ideological dispute with BP Koirala, but it failed to gain any ground and quickly disappeared into obscurity. He was one of the founders of the Poetry Society that was established in 2013 BS (1956-57 CE) under the chairmanship of Laxmi Prasad Devkota.

Vyathit was close to King Mahendra. Mahendra gifted him land and cash to build a home. Mahendra appointed him Chancellor of Royal Nepal Academy c. 1969 CE, as a successor to himself, making him the first commoner to hold the position. Vyathit became the Minister of Transport and Communications in 1962, after Mahendra deposed the democratic government and initiated the partyless Panchayat System. In 1962, Vyathit founded Nepali Literature Institute, the first literary institution in Nepal. He was the founding secretary of the Institute; he became the chairperson two years later.

In 2019 BS (1962-63 CE), an international literary conference was held in Kathmandu under his leadership. He directed or guided national literary conferences in various cities throughout Nepal in the next decade. King Mahendra, pen named M. B. B Shah, was among the participants. He was also known for holding mini-conferences and poetry recitals in his home.

He was the Home Minister in 2036 BS (1979-80 CE) during the democracy protests and the subsequent referendum on the political system governing the country. He was criticised for the use of force by the Police during the protests. According to Govinda Giri Prerana, he vowed never to accept a ministerial position again.

=== Death ===
He died on 10 September 1998 CE while undergoing treatment at TU Teaching Hospital in Maharajgunj, Kathmandu. He was confined to bed in his final years, after he fell down in the bathroom of Royal Nepal Academy and broke his leg.

== Awards and recognition ==
Vyathit was awarded Bedhnidhi Puraskar in 2046 BS (1989-90 CE). He was awarded the Jagadamba Shree Puraskar in 2049 BS (1992-93 CE) in recognition of his 50 years of service to Nepali literature through his writings as well as institutional roles and organisational activities. He was also a recipient of the Jyotirmaya Trisakti Patta–First class and Gorkha Dakshin Bahu–First class. Notable among his other awards include Prithvi Pragya Puraskar, Shrestha Sirapa Puraskar, Jagadambashree Puraskar and Sitaram Puraskar.

Nai Prakashan conferred him the title of "Rajkavi". Madan Mani Dixit had conferred him the title of "Vishwakavi" and advocated vociferously for public acceptance of the title; he did not succeed.

== Works ==
He published at least 23 volumes of poem collection, sixteen of them in Nepal, and four each in Newari and Hindi.

- Sangam (Confluence, 1952)
- 2009 salko Kavita (Poems of the year 2009[BS], 1952-53)
- Pranava (Obeisance, 1957)
- Ek Din (One Day, 1958)
- Triveni ([Confluence of] three rivers, 1958)
- Juneli (Moonlight, 1962)
- Sapta Parna (Seven Feathers, 1967)
- Nari: Rasa, Madhurya, Aloka (Woman: Flavour, Sweetness, Brightness, 1968)
- Avaj (The Voice, 1974)
- Badalirahane Badalka Akriti (The Ever-changing Shapes of Clouds, 1976)
- Mero Sapanama Hamro Desh ra Hami (Us and Our Country in My Dreams, 1977)
- Ras Triphala (Three Fruit of Flavour, 1981)
- Agni-Shringar (Fire-Decoration, 1982)
- Sanchayita[Collector]
- Saptarna (2028 BS (1971-72 CE))
- Feri Arko Euta Kurukshetra[Again, one other Kurukshetra]
- Pratikshya[Wait(noun)], in Newari
- Diwas Chitra[Image of a day], in Newari
- Swawin Pyah Gumye, in Newari
- Chwasa, in Newari
- Hamara Desh - Hamara Swapna[Our Country - Our Dream], in Hindi
- Trayi, in Hindi
- Selected Poems, in English

He also wrote the poem Meri Priyasi: Prajatantrik Swatantrata[My love: Democratic Freedom] in 2034 BS (1977-78 CE).
