= Bishe Nagarchi =

Gorkhali tailor and musician

Bise Nagarchi (Nepali: बिसे नगर्ची) was an 18th-century Gorkhali tailor and musician who worked for King Prithvi Narayan Shah.

When the Gorkha Kingdom was facing financial crises, Nagarchi suggested that every household in Gorkha should give at least one rupee to fund the war.

He was active during the Unification of Nepal, Nagarchi played war songs on the battlefield which would keep the soldiers motivated. His father was also a musician who worked for the Gorkha Durbar.

Nagarchi was popularised by Poet Shrawan Mukarung. In 2020, a statue of Bise Nagarchi was installed in Gorkha Municipality, Gandaki Province.
