= Ajoy Edwards =

Indian politician

- Born: 9 May 1973 (age 52); Darjeeling, India

Ajoy Edwards is a politician from Darjeeling, West Bengal. He is the founder and president of the regional political party Indian Gorkha Janshakti Front. He is owner of the famous Glenary's restaurant in Darjeeling. Edwards is in local governance and advocates for development in the Darjeeling hills.
