= Darjeeling Municipality =

Local civic body in Darjeeling, India

Coordinates: 27.04054°N 88.26594°E

Type
- Type: Municipality

History
- Founded: 1850; 176 years ago

Leadership
- Chairman: Dipen Thakuri
- Vice Chairman: Prativa Rai

Structure
- Seats: 32
- Political groups: Government (17); BGPM: 15 AITC: 2: Opposition (14); IGJF: 11 GJM: 3: Vacant (1); Vacant: 1

Elections
- Last election: 2022
- Next election: 2027

Meeting place
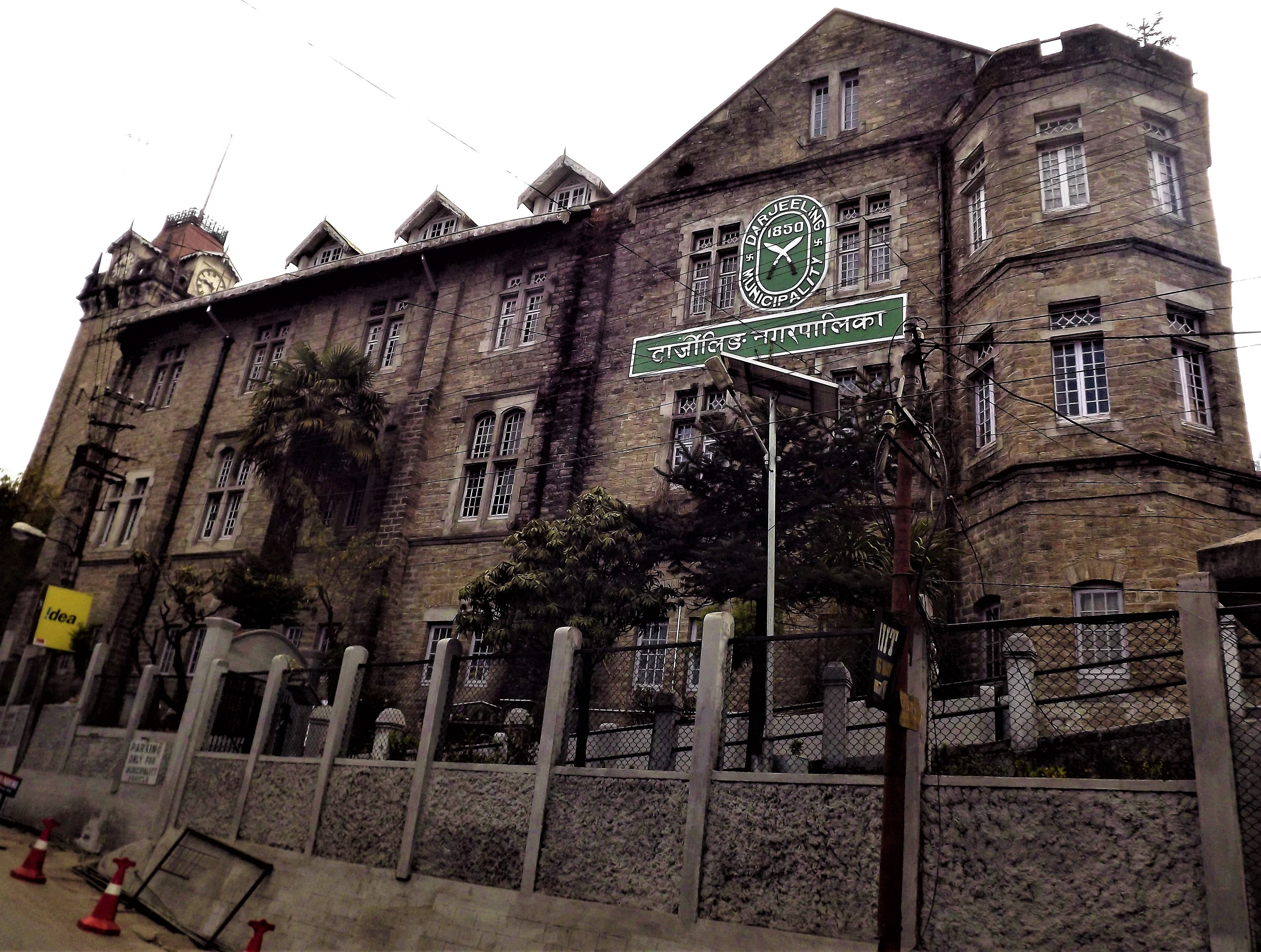
- Municipality Building

Darjeeling Municipality is responsible for the civic administration of the town of Darjeeling, West Bengal, India. Established in 1850, it is one of the oldest municipalities in West Bengal and one of the oldest city administrative bodies in India.

== Structure ==
The municipality refers to the board of Councillors, with one Councillor being elected from each of the 32 wards of Darjeeling town and also some non-elected members who are nominated by the state government. The Board of Councillors elects a chairman from among its elected members.

According to the West Bengal Municipal Act, 1993, Darjeeling municipality is run by the Chairman-in-Council system of governance, and consists of the chairman, the Vice Chairman and seven other members of the board of Councillors. The Chairman is the executive head of the municipality and the municipal administration is under his control. The Chairman nominates the Chairman-in-Council and distributes the various functions of the municipality. The Chairman presides over the meetings of the Chairman-in-Council as well as the board of Councillors, and in his absence the Vice Chairman chairs the meetings. The administrative functions of the municipalities are dealt through the committees and are headed by the Chairman-in-Council.
