= Naya Raj Pant =

Nepalese polymath (1913–2002)

- Born: 10 August 1913; Kathmandu, Nepal
- Died: 4 November 2002 (aged 89); Nepal
- Occupation: Polymath

Naya Raj Pant (Nepali: नयराज पन्त; 1913–2002) was a Nepalese polymath who was active as a poet, astronomer, mathematician, scholar, and historian. He is best known for establishing Saṃśodhana Maṇḍala, research organisation, on 20 September 1952.

He was born on 10 August 1913 in Mahaboudha, Kathmandu to Krishna Datta, and Yajnapriya Datta. Pant died on 4 November 2002.

In 1986–87, he won the Madan Puraskar, Nepal's highest literary honour.

== Notable works ==
- Licchavisaṃvatko nirṇaya
- Nayarāja Pantakā gaṇitīya kr̥ti
- Śrī 3 Mahārāja Padmaśamaśerakā kurā
