= Indian Gorkha Janshakti Front =

- Abbreviation: IGJF
- Leader: Ajoy Edwards
- Founder: Ajoy Edwards
- Founded: 25 November 2021; 4 years ago (as Hamro Party)
- Split from: Gorkha National Liberation Front
- Ideology: Gorkhaland statehood Gorkha nationalism Regionalism
- Colours: Dark Navy Blue
- Seats in Gorkhaland Territorial Administration: 6 / 45
- Seats in Darjeeling Municipality: 11 / 32

Indian Gorkha Janshakti Front (abbr. IGJF) formerly known as Hamro Party, is a political party based in Darjeeling district and Kalimpong district of India. The president of the party is Ajoy Edwards, who was earlier a leader of Gorkha National Liberation Front.

== History ==
The Hamro Party was formed on 25 November 2021, and its founder is Ajoy Edwards. The name of the party, which means "Our Party", was determined in a public survey that was conducted via Edwards' social media channels.

After the merging of Hamro Party with the Indian Gorkha Janshakti Front (IGJF), Ajoy Edwards was designated to be one of the convenors of the political party.

The IGJF political party was formally established in the Darjeeling Hills on 22 December 2024 with a view to creating a separate state of Gorkhaland. At the launching ceremony of the party, Edwards said that the IGJF would have an equidistant position with respect to the state government as well as the central government. At this juncture, it may be pointed out that the GTA was led by the Bharatiya Gorkha Prajatantrik Morcha (BGPM) in collaboration with the All India Trinamool Congress, while the Darjeeling Lok Sabha seat had been held by the Bharatiya Janata Party (BJP) since 2009.

== Election history ==
During the 2022 Darjeeling Municipality elections, Hamro Party contested 32 seats of the municipal wards including 19 women candidates. The party's candidates have a wide range of different occupations like teachers, social activists, guides, single mothers, taxi driver, house husband, and unemployed locals. Although Ajoy Edwards headed the party, he lost his seat in Ward No. 22.

HP contested the Darjeeling Municipality election in February 2022. It won 18 seats out of a total of 32 seats and formed the board. HP contested all 45 seats in the Gorkhaland Territorial Administration election held on 26 June 2022 and won 8 seats. Two HP councillors of the GTA joined Bharatiya Gorkha Prajatantrik Morcha on 5 November 2022.

Five HP ward commissioners of Darjeeling Municipality joined Bharatiya Gorkha Prajatantrik Morcha on 24 November 2022.

One more Hamro Party ward commissioner of Darjeeling Municipality joined BGPM on 21 March 2023.

Due to the support of the defectors and the All India Trinamool Congress (AITC), the BGPM gained control of the municipal council.

The five candidates for the West Bengal Legislative Assembly elections in 2026 on behalf of IGJF were:

• Ajoy Edwards (constituency: Darjeeling)

• Vandana Rai (constituency: Kurseong)

• B. B. Lepcha (constituency: Kalimpong)

• Krishnanand Singh (constituency: Siliguri)

• Nimesh Sundas (constituency: Mat
