= Jagadamba Shree Puraskar =

Nepali cultural award

Jagadamba Shree Purasakar जगदम्बाश्री पुरस्कार
- Awarded for: Contribution to Nepali language, literature, art and folk culture.
- Sponsored by: Madan Puraskar Pustakalaya
- Country: Nepal
- Reward: रु 400,000
- Established: 1989; 37 years ago
- First award: 2045 B.S. (1989)
- Final award: 2080 B.S. (2021)

Highlights
- First recipient: Narayan Gopal (1989)
- Latest recipient: Durga Prasad Shrestha (2021)
- Website: Jagdamba Shree Puraskar
- Related: Madan Puraskar

Jagadamba Shree Puraskar (Nepali: जगदम्बाश्री पुरस्कार) is an award given to a person or an organization for contribution to Nepali language, literature, art and folk culture.

It is presented alongside Madan Puraskar by Madan Puraskar Pustakalaya, on the day of Ghatasthapana; the first day of Dashain festival.

== History ==
It is named after Rani Jagadamba Kumari Devi, the wife of General Madan Shumsher JBR, and daughter-in-law of Prime Minister Chandra Shumsher JBR. It was established in 1989 (2045 BS) in Nepal. Nepali singer Narayan Gopal was the first recipient for his contribution to Nepali music. Since 2075 BS, the award prize has been increased to NRs. 400,000.

== Criteria ==
The criteria for awarding the prize were set on Chaitra 30, 2045 BS based on the suggestion of the members of the organization. When the 'Madan Puraskar' was established in the year 2012 BS, the rules and regulations of the Guthi and the rules related to 'Jagdamba-Shree' were presented by Shri Shambhu Prasad Gyawali.

Some of the criteria based on the official website are:-

- The service of Nepali language is considered as the only basis for the award.
- The award is not given posthumously.
- The award is given to the person / organization among nominees from various fields based on the suggestion and advice by the selection committee which is to be formed every year.

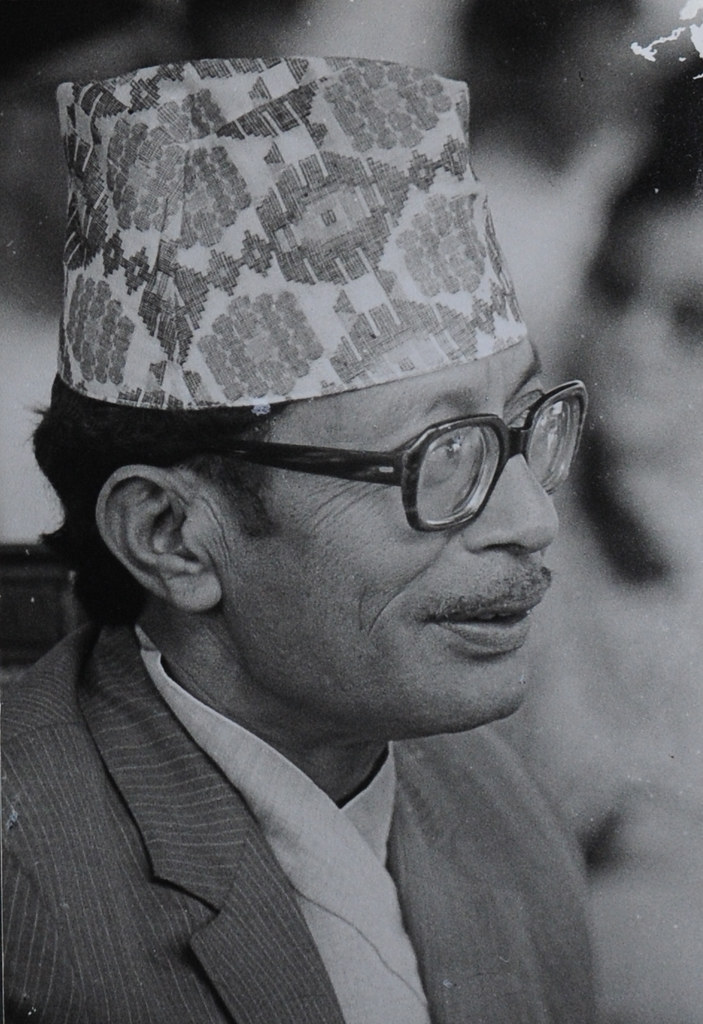
Singer Narayan Gopal is the first recipient of the award (in 1989)

== List of winners ==
Year (in B.S.)^{[a]}	Winner	Awarded for their contributions in
2080	Prof. Dr. Yogendra Prasad Yadav	Nepali Language
2079	Tekbir Mukhiya	Printing skills
2078	Durga Prasad Shrestha	Nepali literature
2077	Bhairav Bahadur Thapa	Study, research, and experimental knowledge of the dance genre
2076	Shanti Thatal	Nepali music
2075	Bairagi Kaila (Til Bikram Nembang Limbu)	Nepali poetry
2074	Shanta Das Manandhar	Promoting, developing, and assisting children literature
2073	Vatsayan (Durga Baral)	Creating awareness by exposing contemporary malpractices through the cartoon
2072	Lil Bahadur Chettri	Nepali literature
2071	Angur Baba Joshi	Nepali language and Nepali society
2070	Shiva Regmi	Research
2069	Ratna Shumsher Thapa	Nepali Poetry
2068	Saṃśodhana Maṇḍala^{[b]}	Iteration and Research in Nepali history
2067	Durga Lal Shrestha	Nepali Poetry
2066	Dr. Rajendra Bimal	Nepali literature
2065	Ram Sharan Darnal	Research in folk music and contribution to the field of music since
2064	Krishna Prasad Parajuli	Nepali literature for children
2063	Dr. Tirtha Bahadur Shrestha	Scientific Nepali language and literature
2062	Bhairab Risal	Nepali language through journalism
2061	Phanindra Raj Khetala	Nepali language through literature
2060	Ali Miya	Nepali poetry
2059	Krishna Prasad Shrestha	Research in Nepali language
2058	Diamond Shumsher Rana	Nepali literature
2057	Dharmaraj Thapa	Nepali music
2056	Nepal Shikshya Parishad	Nepali language and literature
2055	Govinda Bahadur Malla 'Gothale'	Nepali literature
2054	Ambar Gurung	Nepali music
2053	Thakur Prasad Guragain	Nepali language in Myanmar
2052	Hari Prasad 'Gorkha' Rai	Nepali language and literature
2051	Indra Bahadur Rai	Nepali literature
2050	Tara Devi	Nepali music
2049	Nepali Sahitya Sammelan, Darjeeling	Preservation, promotion and amplification of Nepali language
2048	Kedar Man Vyathit	Nepali poetry
2047	Nar Bahadur Bhandari	Nepali language literature outside Nepal
2046	Hari Bansha Acharya, Madan Krishna Shrestha	Entertainment
2045	Narayan Gopal	Nepali music

== See also ==
- Madan Puraskar
- Madan Puraskar Pustakalaya
- Sajha Puraskar
- Padmashree Sahitya Puraskar

== Notes ==
1.^[a] Year in B.S. = Year in C.E. + 56\57; 2077 B.S. = 2020/2021
2.^[b]Accepted by Dr. Mahesh Raj Panta on behalf of the organization
