= Tesro Aayam =

Literary movement in Nepalese literature

- Part of Nepali literature
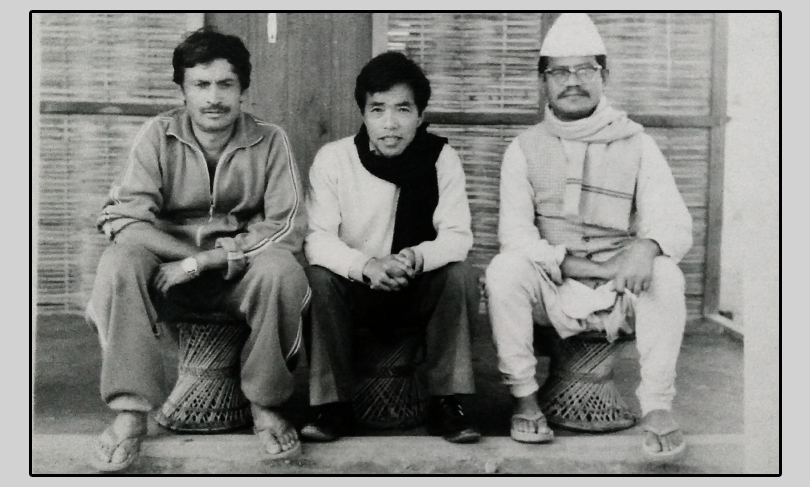
- Tesro Aayam Team: Ishwar Ballav, Indra Bahadur Rai and Bairagi Kainla (From left to right)
- Native name: तेस्रो आयाम
- Date: 1960
- Theme: Postmodernism

Tesro Aayam (Nepali: तेस्रो आयाम, lit. 'Third Dimension') is a literary movement founded by Ishwor Ballav, Bairagi Kainla and Indra Bahadur Rai in 1960 which triggered a new stir in Nepalese and Indian literature. This movement is considered a significant milestone in the history of Nepalese and Indian literature which signalled the beginning of Postmodernism.

== See also ==
- Ralpha
- Aswikrit Sahitya Andolan
