= Ishwar Ballav =

Nepalese Poet and Writer

- ईश्वरबल्लभ
- Born: Ishwar Ballav Bhattarai; 11 July 1937; Jaisi Deval, Kathmandu
- Died: 22 March 2008 (aged 70); Kathmandu
- Occupations: Poet, lyricist
- Spouse: Kamala Bhattarai
- Relatives: Muralidhar Bhattarai (father); Ram Maya Bhattarai (mother)
- Writing career
- Notable works: Aagokaa Phoolharu Hun Aagokaa Phoolharu Hoinan, Kashmai Devay
- Notable awards: Madan Puraskar
- Literary movement: Tesro Aayam

Ishwar Ballav (Nepali: ईश्वरबल्लभ, 11 July 1937 – 22 March 2008) was one of the most influential Nepali poets. He was also a poet of a new dimension–the third dimension–meaning Tesro Ayam in the history of Nepalese literature. He, along with his contemporaries Bairagi Kaila and Indra Bahadur Rai, formed a trio in 1963 in Darjeeling to rethink and evaluate the development of Nepalese literature.

== Bibliography ==
- Aagoka Phoolharu Hun Aagoka Phoolharu Hoinanan
- Samanantar
- Kashmai Devaya
- Euta Saharko Kinarama

== See also ==
- List of Nepalese poets
