= Surya Bikram Gyawali =

Nepali historian (1898–1985)

- सूर्यविक्रम ज्ञवाली
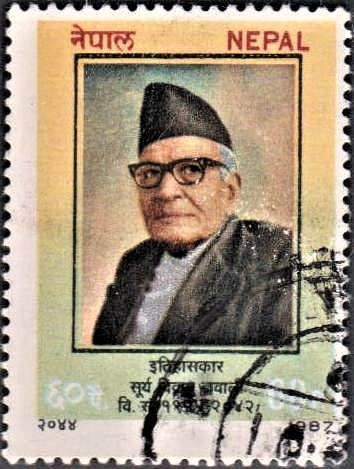
- Nepali stamp featuring Gyawali c. 1987
- Born: 10 June 1898; Benaras, British India
- Died: 1 December 1985 (aged 87); Kathmandu, Kingdom of Nepal
- Occupation: Historian

Surya Bikram Gyawali (Nepali: सूर्यविक्रम ज्ञवाली; born 10 June 1898 – 1 December 1985) was a Nepali historian. He wrote biographies for numerous people including King Prithvi Narayan Shah and writer Bhanubhakta Acharya. Gyawali also served as a head teacher in Darjeeling. He is also a recipient of the Order of Gorkha Dakshina Bahu (first class), the Order of Tri Shakti Patta (second class), and the Tribhuvan Puraskar (1971).

== Biography ==
Gyawali was born on 10 June 1898 (Bikram Sambat: 1955 Jestha 29) in Benaras, British India to Ditta Til Bikram and Parvati Devi. His family had migrated to Benaras from Gulmi. He made a remarkable contribution to the Nepali language, literature, culture and history. He wrote biographies for Prithvi Narayan Shah and Bhanubhakta Acharya. Gyawali, Dharanidhar Koirala, and Parasmani Pradhan were known as "SuDhaPa" who were living in exile in Darjeeling. From 1923 to 1953, he worked at Government High School in Darjeeling later being promoted to a head teacher.

After the 1951 Nepalese revolution, Gyawali moved to Kathmandu. Gyawali served as a Chancellor of the Nepal Academy. He also worked for the Department of Archeology and he was a member of the Rastriya Panchayat. Nepalese artist Lain Singh Bangdel was highly influenced by Gyawali. Surya Bikram Gyawali Marg, a road in Kathmandu is named after him. He was awarded the Order of Gorkha Dakshina Bahu (first class), the Order of Tri Shakti Patta (second class), and the Tribhuvan Puraskar (1971).

== Notable works ==
- Kabi Bhanubhakta ko Jivan Charitra (Nepali: कवि भानुभक्तको जीवनचरित्र); ISBN 9789937919845
- Nepali Birharu
- Bir Itihas
- Nepal Upatyakako Madhyakalin Itihas
- Prithvi Narayan Shah (1977)
- Nepalko Itihaasma Amarsingh Thapa (1944)
