= Binay Tamang =

Indian politician (born 1965)

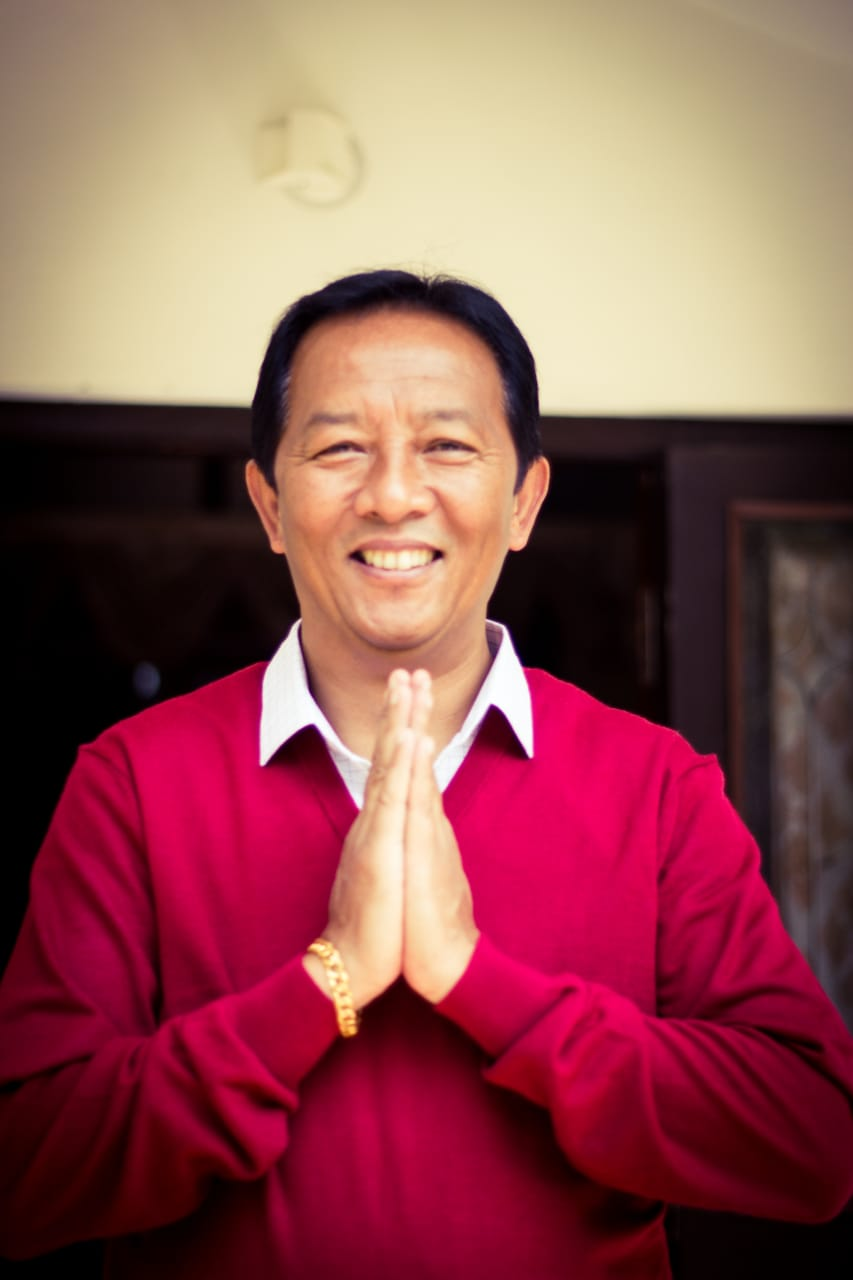

Personal details
- Born: 28 December 1965 (age 60) Darjeeling, West Bengal, India
- Party: Gorkha National Liberation Front (1986–2007); Gorkha Janmukti Morcha (2007–2021); All India Trinamool Congress (2021–2022); Indian National Congress (2023–2024)

Binay Tamang (also Binoy Tamang; born 28 December 1965) is an Indian Politician and a former leader of the Gorkha Janmukti Morcha political party. He joined All India Trinamool Congress in 2021 and left in 2022. After then he joined Indian National Congress in 2023 and became State General Secretary of the party.

== Early life ==
Tamang lived and studied in Darjeeling from the very beginning. As a young boy, he was always inspired by the stories of the great Gorkhas of the nation and dreamt of working for the progress of the Gorkhas. He was especially inspired and influenced by the movement and vision of GNLF and hence, became an active member of GNLF in 1986. This was one act that was to change his life forever and set him on a momentous journey towards the leadership of the Gorkha Janmukti Morcha.

== Career ==
In 1997, Tamang got higher responsibilities and therefore, he was made the President of Sadar I Constituency in DGHC. From 1999 to early 2007, he dedicated his service to medically deprived patients with cardiac, carcinoma, hemolytic, nephrotic and neurotic ailments.

He was the Media and Management In-Charge of Prashant Tamang Fan Club late in 2006 to 23 September 2007. In the year 2007, a new political party in name of Gorkha Janmukti Morcha was formed and he was the Press and Publicity Secretary until the 10 August 2009. From 11 August 2009 to October 2017, he was made the Asst General Secretary of Gorkha Janmukti Morcha.

After the political transition in late 2017, he took over the charge as the President of Gorkha Janmukti Morcha. During the 2013 Gorkhaland Movement, several leaders and activists were arrested. Anit Thapa was arrested in July 2013 and Binoy Tamang was arrested on 21 August 2013.

Anit Thapa was in Siliguri Correctional Home (Jail) for 7 months and Binoy Tamang was in Jalpaiguri Central Correctional Home (Jail) for 6 months. When he was in Jalpaiguri Jail, Gorkha Janmukti Morcha Party Central heads and the Elected Sabhasads of Gorkhaland Territorial Administration (GTA) unanimously gave him the post of Chief Executive, GTA, and that decision was endorsed and approved by Bimal Gurung and it was the month of October 2013.

After designating Binoy Tamang as the Chief Executive of GTA after the short span of just 40 days or so, Bimal Gurung suddenly changed his mind and appointed himself as the Chief Executive of GTA. At the time of oath-taking, they (Tamang and others) were in jail. For the cause of Gorkhas, he along with his co-leaders and activists participated in fast unto death (hunger) strike in front of District Magistrate Office, Darjeeling for 9 days in the year 2012. In September 2013 when he was in Jalpaiguri Central Jail, he went on Fast unto Death Hunger Strike for 10 days.

In the year 2017, during Gorkhaland Movement, he had proposed for Fast Unto death hunger strike during GMCC meeting thrice, finally, during 5th meeting of GMCC, he has declared during a press meet in Mirik for Fast Unto Death Hunger Strike, dramatically Bimal Gurung changed his strategy and asked him to drop his stand of hunger strike.

Gurung's GJM was demanding a separate Gorkha state and in 2017 a massive agitation began which also turned violent. Because of Gurung's mishandling, the situation turned disastrous in which 10 people died in alleged police firing. When Gurung was on the run, the GJM broke up. Mamata Banerjee was successful in quelling the violent agitation after engineering a split between Bimal Gurung and Binay Tamang, a close aide to Gurung. Tamang alleged that Gurung wanted to get him killed and extended support to TMC along with his faction. In September 2017, the West Bengal Government appointed the Gorkha Janmukti Morcha (GJM) leader Binay Tamang as the chairman of a new board of administrators to run the Darjeeling hills.

In 2019, the Calcutta High Court directed both factions of the GJM not to use the party symbol to contest polls. Tamang stepped down as the Chairman of GTA and fought the State Assembly By-election as an independent candidate with the support of AITC, but he lost the election. Later in that year, he took the decision to go for a fast unto death hunger strike for the welfare of Tea Gardens workers. He sat for Hunger Strike demanding a 20 percent bonus for Tea Gardens Workers on the day of 6 October 2019 and in the afternoon of 11 October 2019, after the intervention of State Government of West Bengal, Tea Stakeholders were agreed on 20 percent bonus.

Tamang has been an active supporter of Nepali Bhasa Manyata Andolan since he was a school student. During the visit of the then Prime Minister of India Late Morarji Desai to Darjeeling, Binoy Tamang was detained by Darjeeling Sadar Police because he showed him his Black Naughty Boy Shoe (the then PM Morarji Desai deliberately made the statement that the Nepali language is a foreign language and Nepalis are foreigners). Akhil Bharatiya Nepali Bhasa Samity, the Non-Political Organisation which led the movement for Nepali Bhasa, had asked the people of Darjeeling to show black flags during the PM's visit in Darjeeling.

During the Nepali Bhasa movement too, Tamang sat on hunger strike for 2 days at Chowrastha Mall.

In October 2020, Bimal Gurung resurfaced and announced unconditional support to Mamata Banerjee for the 2021 Assembly elections. He said that while Mamata Banerjee always kept her promises, the BJP never kept its word. The Banerjee government cleared their stance on the Gorkhaland issue by not supporting the demand for a separate state. Trinamool Congress allotted three seats (Kalimpong, Darjeeling, Kurseong) in the hills to GJM. Leaders of the Gurung faction had earlier promised to back the TMC in the rest of the 14 seats in Darjeeling, Jalpaiguri and Alipurduar districts. Even though both factions of the GJM (one led by Gurung and another led by Tamang) extended their support to TMC for the 2021 assembly election, both declared to field their candidates in each of the three seats which were allotted to them. As a result, the GJM faction headed by Tamang won only one out of three seats. In July 2021, Binay Tamang announced his resignation from all positions of the party and handed over flags of the party to Gurung. Anit Thapa became the acting president of the second faction of GJM.

Anit Thapa launched a new party Bharatiya Gorkha Prajatantrik Morcha (BGPM) on 9 September 2021. BGPM aligned with the TMC and formed an election committee to contest the GTA elections.

Tamang joined All India Trinamool Congress on 24 December 2021. Binay Tamang, who had won the 2022 GTA election on a TMC ticket but had left that party afterwards, joined Congress on 26 November 2023. He was expelled from Congress on 23 April 2024.

== See also ==
- Gorkhaland Territorial Administration
- Gorkhaland
- Gorkha Janmukti Morcha
