= Sudangpha =

Ahom king from 1397 to 1407

Sudangphaa
- Chaopha of Ahom Kingdom

Ahom king
- Reign: 1397–1407
- Predecessor: Tyao Khamti
- Successor: Sujangphaa
- Born: Habung
- Died: c. 1407; Ahom kingdom
- Spouse: Sao Nangsheng
- Dynasty: Ahom dynasty
- Father: Tyao Khamti
- Religion: Ahom religion

Sudangpha (died 1407) was a Chaopha of the Ahom kingdom. He was popularly known as Bamuni Konwar (Brahman prince) because of his upbringing in a Brahman's house. His reign marks the first stage in the growth of Hinduism in the Ahom dynasty. He initiated the Singarigharutha ceremony (coronation ceremony) of the Ahom kings, a tradition which was followed by his successors.

== Birth & childhood ==
Sudangpha was the son of Ahom ruler Tyao Khamti, from his younger queen. Tyao Khamti went on a military expedition against the Chutiya Kingdom, to avenge the murder of his elder brother, king Sutupha. He appointed his elder queen in charge of the kingdom, in his absence. The younger queen was pregnant at the time of the king's departure. The elder queen was jealous of the younger queen as the latter was more favourite to the king and also she was about to give birth to king's first child, which will enhance her position. Therefore, in order to get rid of younger queen, the elder queen took advantage of her position as regent to cause a false accusation to be preferred against her. The charge was investigated and declared true, whereupon the elder queen ordered her to be beheaded. The ministers however, seeing that she was pregnant, instead of killing her set her adrift on the Dihing on a raft. The Habung region at the time was under the control of Chutia kings.

She died after giving birth to a boy and told the Brahman about the real identity of the boy. The Brahman brought up the young prince along with his other children. The young prince took the Brahman and his family as his own and spent his childhood with them.

== Assassination of Tyao Khamti ==
King Tyao Khamti was horrified to hear of the execution of his favourite wife, especially when a new and impartial inquiry showed that the allegations against her were false. He was, however, too much under the influence of his elder queen to venture to take action against her. This, and his failure to prevent her from committing numerous acts of oppression, irritated the nobles so much that in 1389 CE, they caused him to be assassinated. The notorious elder queen was also put to death and was entombed along with the king in Charaideo.

== Accession to the throne ==
Since there were no suitable successors to the throne, Chaothai Khum Burhagohain and Borgohain ruled the kingdom without a king from 1389 to 1397. In 1397, an Ahom trader named Thao Cheoken went across the Brahmaputra to trade in cattle, and there, in Habung village, he saw the young prince. Curious of the young boy's noble appearance, he made inquiries about him, and learnt that he was the son of king Tyao Khamti's younger queen. The Burhagohain was informed of these facts and after verifying the story and consulting the other ministers, he brought the young prince, who was then fifteen years of age, to the capital Charaideo and placed him on the throne. He took the name Sudangpha and took control of his royal authority.

== Reign ==
=== Introduction of Hindu religious rituals in Ahom court ===
Sudangpha brought with him from the Habung country the Brahman who had sheltered him and his sons. The latter were given post of importance on the frontier, while the old Brahman himself was installed as his confidential adviser, and, under his influence, many Hindu rites and ceremonies began to be observed. The Brahman introduced the prayer of Lakshmi-Narayan Salagram in the royal palace. It was the beginning of Brahmanical influence and attraction towards Hinduism in the Ahom Dynasty.

=== Suppression of Tipam Chiefs ===
The Tipam chiefs, who were dissatisfied with the new regime, hatched a plot against the young king. This came to his ears, but instead of at once taking open steps against the conspirators, he caused a stockade for catching elephants to be constructed, and having caught some elephants, invited them to join him in the celebrating the occasion by a feast. When the festivities were in full swing and all suspicion had been allayed, the conspirators were suddenly overpowered and put to death. According to a practice which was common among the Ahoms and many Asiatic tribes, their heads were piled up in a heap as a trophy.

=== War with Mongkawng ===
The reasons for the outbreak of war with Mongkawng (called Nara in Ahom chronicles), a Shan state in Upper Burma, during the reign of Sudangpha vary among the historians. One chronicle stated that Sudangpha endeavoured to conciliate the rest of the Tipamias by marrying the daughter of one of their chiefs named Khuntai. The girl, however, had already become enamoured of a Tipamia named Tai Sulai, and the latter, after dining one night with the king, sent a ring to the queen by one of his servants. The king was informed of this, and called for an explanation from Tai Sulai, who fled forthwith to Surumpha, king of Mungkang, and begged for help. Some historians differ with this version of story. According to them, Tai Sulai was the youngest son of Ahom king Sukhangpha and princess of Kamata kingdom Bhajani (some sources say the princess name was Rajani; some said that Rajani and Bhajani were two sisters who were married to Sukhangpha). After the assassination of Tyaokhamti, Tai Chulai attempted to become king, but the nobles led by Chaothai Khum Burhagohain opposed his candidature at that time. Later when Chaothai Khum Burhagohain and other nobles installed Sudangpha as the king of Ahom kingdom, a disheartened Tai Chulai went to Mungkang and informed its ruler that the Ahom dynasty founded by Sukapha has ended and the kingdom was in the state of anarchy. However, it can be debated that Tai Sulai was actually a Tipamia and not the son of Ahom king Sukhangpha, as being the later would make him more than 68 years old by 1400 CE. Moreover, here the writer seems to have confused Tai Chulai with the story of Chao Pulai; which is the exact same tale, but instead with Sukhangpha's son Sukhrangpha.

The rulers of Mungkang used to consider Sukapha and the Ahom dynasty as his kinsmen as both claim to be descendant of Lengdon, the god of heaven and earth. Surumpha, the king of Mungkang, sent a military expedition along with Tai Chulai, led by his minister, Tasim Pou Borgohain. Sudangpha personally led his army against the invaders and a battle was fought near Kuhiarbari in the Tipam country. Sudangpha sustained a slight wound from an enemy spear while riding on an elephant at the head of his army in the battlefield, but the battle turned in Ahom's favour and the invaders were defeated. Sudangpha ordered Nangchukham Borgohain to chase the vanquished enemy, who chased them as far as Patkai hill range. At last, the commander of Mungkang army, Tasim Pou Borgohain, sought peace from Ahom side, to which the commander of Ahom army, Nangchukham Borgohain, agreed. A formal treaty was concluded in 1401 CE, by which the Patkai hill range was fixed as the boundary between the two countries. The meeting of the two Borgohains, who conducted the negotiations for peace, took place on the side of Nongnyang lake, twenty-eight miles south-west of Margherita and statues of them are said to have been carved in the rock there. A solemn oath of amity was sworn, and consecrated by the cutting up of a fowl. The word Patkai is said to be derived from this incident. The full name was Pat-kai-seng-keu, which means "cut-fowl-oath-sworn". The former name of the pass was Dai-kau-rang or "the junction of nine peaks". Nong-nyang means "lake shaking".

=== Transfer of capital and Singarigharutha ceremony ===
After the peace treaty with Mungkang, Sudangpha decided to transfer his capital from Charaideo to Charguwa near Dihing river in 1403 CE. On the occasion of establishing a new capital, Sudangpha performed the Singarigharutha ceremony, the traditional Tai-Ahom coronation ceremony of kings. The ceremony was termed as Singarigharutha because the woods of Singari tree were used to construct the main platform in which the King used to sit during the procedure of the ceremony.

=== Expedition against Kamata kingdom ===
Meanwhile, Tai Sulai, being deprived of his asylum, took refuge with the king of Kamata along with one Tipamia Konwar(who had earlier accompanied him to Mungkhang) Sudangpha demanded extradition of Tai Sulai, but the ruler of Kamata refused. Sudangpha dispatched Nangchukham Borgohain to invade Kamata. At that time, Muslim rulers from Bengal invaded Kamata. Therefore, the king of Kamata desired peace with Ahoms. He gave one of his daughters in marriage to Sudangpha, with a dowry of two elephants and a number of horses and male and female servants, as well as a quantity of gold and silver.

=== Subjugation of Tipam, Khamjang and Aiton tribes ===
The chiefs of Tipam, Khamjang and Aiton tribes rebelled against the authority of Sudangpha by refusing to pay tribute. It was found that the king of Nara (one of the Shan kingdoms in Upper Burma) was encouraging the rebels. Sudangpha sent messengers to remonstrate with the king of Nara, who in turn warned the rebel chiefs not to expect any aid from him. This turn of events forced the rebel chiefs to submit to the authority of Sudangpha.

== Death, character and legacy ==
Sudangpha died in 1407 after a reign of ten years. In his chronicle about the history of Assam, Gunaviram Barua stated that the king indulged most of his time in pleasure, which is also the reason for his demise at a young age, but its accuracy is doubtful since none of the old Ahom chronicles or Buranjis agrees with it. On the other hand, he was described as young and energetic. During his decade-long reign, he faced threats, both internal and external, yet he never lost his nerves and deals every problem with determination and wits. During the war with Mungkang, he personally led his army and gained decisive victory, despite being injured by an enemy's spear. Sudangpha also introduced religious practices of Hinduism among the Ahom community, although it will take many more years to completely bring the Ahom community in its fold. The practice of Singarigharutha of Ahom kings was also introduced by him, which will be followed by his successors almost till the end of Ahom supremacy in Assam.

== See also ==
- Ahom dynasty
- Assam
- Charaideo
- Sibsagar district
- Singarigharutha ceremony
- Sukapha
