= Tyao Khamti =

Chao Tyao Kham Ti
- Chaopha of Ahom Kingdom

Ahom King
- Reign: 1380 CE to 1387 CE
- Predecessor: Sutuphaa
- Successor: Sudangphaa
- Born: Ahom Kingdom
- Died: c. 1387; Ahom Kingdom
- Issue: Sudangphaa
Names
- Chao Tyao Kham Ti Pha
- Dynasty: Ahom dynasty
- Father: Sukhaangphaa
- Religion: Ahom religion

Tyao Khamti or Tao Khamthi was the king of Ahom kingdom from 1380 CE to 1387 CE. His accession to the throne put an end to the interregnum in Ahom kingdom, which lasted from 1376 CE to 1380 CE, after king Sutuphaa was treacherously murdered by Chutia king. But his weakness towards his elder queen and to her acts of atrocities towards common people, ultimately led to his own assassination, followed by another interregnum.

== Ancestry and accession to the throne ==
Tyao Khamti was the third son of Ahom king Sukhaangphaa. After the death of king Sukhaangphaa, his two elder sons subsequently succeeded him, Sukhrangphaa from 1332 CE to 1364 CE, and Sutuphaa from 1364 CE to 1376 CE. In 1376 CE, Ahom king Sutuphaa was treacherously murdered by the Chutiya king. The nobles led by the Burhagohain and the Borgohain came into conclusion that none of the princes were fit enough to rule the kingdom, therefore, the ministers, Burhagohain and Borgohain ruled the kingdom without any king for four years (1376–1380). Finding it difficult to rule the state without a king, the nobles installed Tyao Khamti as the king of Ahom kingdom in 1380 CE.

== Reign ==
=== Affairs in royal family ===
Tyao Khamti had two wives. Of the two, the younger queen (the second wife) was his favorite. Tyao Khamti had appointed his elder queen in charge of the kingdom, in his absence. The younger queen was pregnant at the time of the king's departure. The elder queen was jealous of the younger queen as the latter was more favored by the king and she was about to give birth to king's first child, which would enhance her position. Therefore, in order to get rid of younger queen, the elder queen took advantage of her position as regent to cause a false accusation to be preferred against her. The charge was investigated and declared true, whereupon the elder queen ordered her to be beheaded. The ministers however, seeing that she was pregnant, set her adrift on the Brahmaputra on a raft instead of killing her. The raft floated for some time and landed in Habung village, where a Brahmin gave the unfortunate woman shelter. She died after giving birth to a boy and told the Brahmin about the real identity of the boy. The Brahmin brought up the young prince along with his other children. The young prince took the Brahmin and his family as his own and spent his childhood with them. The boy would later be crowned as the king of Ahom Kingdom in 1397 CE, and named as Sudangphaa.

=== Assassination ===
Tyao Khamti was horrified to hear of the execution of his favorite wife, especially when a new and impartial enquiry showed that the allegations against her were false. He was, however, too much under the influence of his elder queen to venture to take action against her. This, and his failure to prevent her from committing numerous acts of oppression, irritated the nobles so much that in 1389 CE, they caused him to be assassinated. The notorious elder queen was also put to death and was entombed along with the king in Charaideo.

== Character and legacy ==
Not much is written about Tyao Khamti's character in ancient Ahom chronicles, yet one can find that he was brave and courageous, from the fact that he personally led the army against Chutia kingdom, yet his inability to take action against his elder queen, showed the weakness in his character. His assassination resulted in another period of interregnum which lasted from 1389 CE to 1397 CE, until his son Sudangphaa by his second wife ascended the throne.

== See also ==
- Ahom Dynasty
- Ahom Kingdom
- Assam
- Charaideo
- Sibsagar district
- Sukaphaa
- Chutia Kingdom
