= Suphakpha =

Ahom king from 1422 to 1439

Suphakphaa
- Chaopha of Ahom Kingdom

Ahom King
- Reign: 1422–1439
- Predecessor: Sujangphaa
- Successor: Susenphaa
- Born: Ahom kingdom
- Died: c. 1439; Ahom kingdom
- Spouse: Tipam Princess
- Issue: Susenphaa
- Dynasty: Ahom dynasty
- Father: Sujangphaa
- Religion: Ahom religion

Suphakphaa was the king of Ahom kingdom from 1422 CE to 1439 CE. He was the son of the king Sujangphaa. Suphakphaa succeeded his father in 1422 CE and reigned for seventeen years. Nothing of any importance was recorded by Ahom chronicles about his reign. He died in 1439 CE and was succeeded by his son, Susenphaa.

== See also ==
- Ahom dynasty
- Ahom kingdom
- Assam
- Charaideo
- Sibsagar district
- Singarigharutha ceremony
- Sukaphaa
