= Sujangpha =

Ahom king from 1407 to 1422

Sujangphaa
- Chaopha of Ahom Kingdom

Ahom King
- Reign: 1407–1422
- Predecessor: Sudangphaa
- Successor: Suphakphaa
- Born: Ahom kingdom
- Died: c. 1422; Ahom kingdom
- Issue: Suphakphaa
- Dynasty: Ahom dynasty
- Father: Sudangphaa
- Religion: Ahom religion

Sujangpha was the king of the Ahom kingdom from 1407 to 1422. He was the eldest of King Sudangpha's three sons. After the death of his father at an early age, Sujangpha ascended the throne in 1407. Nothing of any importance was recorded in the chronicles of Ahom during his fifteen year long reign. He died in 1422 and was succeeded by his son, Suphakpha.

== See also ==
- Ahom Dynasty
- Assam
- Sibsagar district
- Singarigharutha ceremony
- Sukapha
