= Susenpha =

Ahom king from 1439 to 1488

Susenphaa
- Chaopha of Ahom Kingdom

Ahom King
- Reign: 1439–1488
- Predecessor: Suphakphaa
- Successor: Suhenphaa
- Born: Tyaophasuphuk; Ahom kingdom
- Died: c. 1488; Ahom kingdom
- Issue: Suhenphaa
- Dynasty: Ahom dynasty
- Father: Suphakphaa
- Mother: Tipam Princess
- Religion: Ahom religion

Susenpha was the king of Ahom kingdom from 1439 to 1488. Contemporary Ahom chronicles described him as a good king and the people under him were happy and prosperous. He ruled for a long period of 49 years. The only trouble which was recorded during his reign was the raids of Tangsu Nagas, which was dealt with the use of force, but not without losses.

== Ancestry and accession ==
Susenpha was the eldest son of Ahom king Suphakpha by a Tipam princess. His parents named him Tyaophasuphuk. After the death of his father, he ascended the throne in 1439 CE and was named as Susenpha.

== Reign ==
=== Expedition against Tangsu Nagas ===
The Tangsu Nagas were conducting frequent raids on the people of Ahom kingdom, causing much harm to the lives and properties of the people. They also attacked neighbouring Naga tribes and inflicted heavy casualties. One of the Naga tribe, the Akhampa Nagas (also known as Akhampani Nagas) came to Susenpha with a present of swords as a token of their submission. They complained Susenpha about the atrocities committed by Tangsu Nagas and sought his help to defend them from these frequent raids of the Tangsu Nagas. Susenpha immediately rallied his men and personally led an expedition against the strongholds of the Tangsu Nagas. The battle was fierce and bloody and the Ahoms lost one hundred and forty men, but, finally they managed to rout the Tangsu Nagas at the end. According to one account, the Ahoms almost lost the battle and was forced to retreat. Susenpha himself was forced to flee from the battlefield in a litter, being so overcome with panic that he was purged as he sat there. In that moment of chaos, an Ahom officer, Banrukia Gohain, rallied the troops, attacked and defeated the Tangsu Nagas with heavy loss. The Ahoms destroyed the villages of Tangsu Nagas and forced them to submit. A victorious Susenpha returned to the capital.

== Death and legacy ==
Susenpha died in 1488 CE after a long reign of forty-nine years. The scanty references to his long reign in the Ahom Buranjis may perhaps be taken as proof that he was a good king and that under his rule the people were contended and prosperous.

== See also ==
- Ahom Dynasty
- Ahom Kingdom
- Assam
- Baro-Bhuyan
- Madhavdeva
- Nagaland
- Sankardev
- Sibsagar district
- Singarigharutha ceremony
- Sukapha
