= Moranhat =

- town
- Location in Assam, India Moranhat (India)
- Coordinates: 27.193361°N 94.922132°E
- Country: India
- State: Assam
- District: Charaideo

Government
  - Body: Moranhat Town Committee

Population (2001)
  - Total: 5,779

Languages
  - Official: Assamese
- Time zone: UTC+5:30 (IST)
- PIN: 785670
- Vehicle registration: AS

Moranhat (IPA: ˈmɔːrænˌhɑːt) is a small town and a town area committee in Charaideo district in the Indian state of Assam.The town is divided by N.H 37 into Charaideo and Dibrugarh district.

== Etymology ==
The place used to be a trade centre where the people from Moran tribe used to visit in order to sell their products in the north of Dihing which was located in the Chutiya kingdom. It is from this centre that "Moran-hat" derives its name. The tribe Moran probably got its name from this region.

== History ==
The area known as Moranhat located in the Sibsagar is of great historical significance in Upper Assam. The place got its name from the market (hat in Assamese) set up by the people of Moran tribe in ancient times. The community probably got its name from the place as there are other places nearby with similar names as Moranjan, Moran Changmai, etc. The geographical condition of the region was very different from today in those times. At that time, the Dihing river flowed south of present-day Moranhat and Sepon region as the Disoi, had the rivers Disang and Dikhou as its tributaries, ultimately joining the Brahmaputra in Mahuramukh (Bokakhat) and Lakhou (Kaliabor). At a later period (probably late 16th century), this stream of the Dihing dried out and the Dihing took another course to the north. This led to the overflow of water in the Brahmaputra to the north and the previously dried out course of Dihing was taken up by the Brahmaputra which lead to the formation of Majuli island. The people of the Moran tribe lived to the south of the Dihing (Diroi) while the Chutia people lived north of the Dihing. The Morans often crossed the Dihing and set up their markets in Moranhat. Finally, after the fall of Chutia kingdom, the region was occupied by the Ahoms whose king Suhungmung of the 16th-century built his capital in Bakata near the banks of the Dihing river. Before that, the queen of Tyao Khamti also fled the Ahom kingdom by crossing the Dihing and reached Habung while further shows the geographical condition of that time.

== Demographics ==
Moranhat is a town located in the eastern part of Assam or Upper Assam. It derives its name from the Moran community (an indigenous Assamese community) . The town is surrounded by tea gardens, oil fields, and villages. As of 2001 India census, Moranhat had a population of 5779. Males constitute 55% of the population and females 45%. Moranhat has an average literacy rate of 78%, higher than the national average of 59.5%: male literacy is 80%, and female literacy is 77%. Eleven per cent of the population in Moranhat is under 6 years of age. Predominantly indigenous Assamese communities are present in the area, the town also comprises immigrant Muslims, Jains, Christians constitute the remaining population. Bengalis, Christians, Sikhs, Bhojpuris, and Tamilians—who mostly come here on teaching assignments at the convent schools—are some of the major communities residing in this town. The primary occupation of the inhabitants of this town is teaching. Farming and small-scale businesses are also two of the important earning avenues for the people. Assamese is the main indigenous language spoken in Moranhat, followed by immigrant languages like Bengali, Hindi, Bhojpuri, and Punjabi spoken by immigrants.

A unique geographical feature of Moranhat is its location between two districts— Charaideo (bifurcated from Sivasagar district), known as Moranhat and Dibrugarh, also known as Moran town. The National Highway-37 passes through the heart of Moranhat. The National Highway acts as the divider, where one side falls under the jurisdiction of Charaideo district and the other under the Dibrugarh district.

=== Languages ===
Languages spoken in Moranhat town (2011)
1. Assamese (51.3%)
2. Hindi (18.9%)
3. Bengali (17.5%)
4. Others (12.3%)

Moranhat town has a population of 154,296 as per the 2011 census. Assamese is spoken by 2,963 people, Bengali by 1,012, Hindi by 1,092 and Bhojpuri by 313 people.

== Education ==
On the education front, there are several Assamese and English medium convent schools as well as a large number of vernacular schools. The most popular school of the best reputation is The St Joseph's High School. The Moran Higher Secondary School is one of the major institutes in Moran boosting education in this locality. The OIL India Higher Secondary School situated in the OIL township hosts the largest campus. Bronson & Brown English Academy, Holy Child English Academy and The St Andrews High School, Moranhat is also highly regarded. The Moran Girls' High School, Moran College, Moran Mahila Mahavidyalaya, Moran Junior College, and Moran Commerce College are some of the other major institutes of Higher Education of the locality. The Nehru Hindi Vidyalaya is a Hindi-medium school. The nearest University is the Dibrugarh University.

== Transport ==
Moranhat is well-connected to all the major places of Assam through private and state government bus services. The nearest railway station is Moranhat, and the nearest airport is Mohanbari Airport, which is around 40 km away from the town. The Moranhat Railway Station falls under the Northeast Frontier Railway and is becoming increasingly a busy railway station. Assam's capital city of Dispur is over 300 km (8–9 hrs bus journey) from the town.

There is an array of food outlets in Moranhat on and off the National Highway and are hence thronged by travelers on their visits to places like Dibrugarh and Tinsukia (along the extreme east). The nearest developed village to Moran is the renowned Khatkhati.
