= Suteupha =

Suteuphaa
- Chaopha of Ahom Kingdom

Ahom King
- Predecessor: Sukaphaa
- Successor: Subinphaa
- Reign: 1268 CE to 1281 CE
- Died: c. 1281; Ahom Kingdom
- Issue: Subinphaa
Names
- Chaopha Suteuphaa
- Dynasty: Ahom dynasty
- Father: Sukaphaa
- Religion: Ahom religion

Suteupha was the second king of Ahom kingdom who ruled from 1268 CE to 1281 CE. Suteupha succeeded his father Sukapha, who laid the foundation of Ahom kingdom in Assam. His reign was characterized by the expansion of his father’s kingdom. He also had conflicts with the Shans or Naras of Mungkang, a Shan kingdom in Upper Burma.

== Ancestry and accession ==
Suteupha was the eldest son of Ahom king Sukapha. After a reign of 39 years, Sukapha died in 1268 CE. The nobles installed Suteupha as the new king of Ahom kingdom. After his accession, Suteupha sent embassy to the ancestral homeland of Sukapha, informing its ruler Sukhranpha, the brother of Sukapha, about the demise of Sukapha and his accession to the throne. Sukhranpha sent gifts to Suteupha consisting of caps made of gold and silver and two specially designed bows, congratulating his coronation as the king of Ahom kingdom.

== Reign ==
=== Expansion of the kingdom ===
Suteupha desired to expand his father’s kingdom. Therefore, in order to fulfill his desire, he came in conflicts with the Kacharis residing in the neighbouring region. At that time, many parts of Upper Assam were inhabited by the Kacharis, though it was not known whether all the Kachari tribes were part of the same kingdom. He forced the Kacharis to abandon the country which lies to the east of Dikhou river. One of the Ahom Buranji or historical document describes the event in an interesting way. Suteupha claimed the track east of Dikhou river as his own. The local Kachari inhabitants opposed his claim. Instead of resorting to warfare, both sides decided to solve this matter in a peaceful way. The Ahom challenged the Kacharis to build a canal from their settlement to Dikhou river within a duration of one night. If the Kacharis successfully complete the work within allotted time, the track will be theirs otherwise it would come under Ahom rule. The Kacharis accepted the challenge. They worked on the construction of the canal and were on the verge of completing it when the Ahoms resorted to tricks. On Suteupha’s personal instruction, some Ahom soldiers were hiding in the forest near the construction site. Each soldier had one rooster along with them. Seeing that the Kacharis were on the verge of completing the canal, the Ahom soldiers hiding in the forest, made the roosters to cock. Since it was full moon night, the Kacharis could not determine the actual time and they believed that they have lost the bet since cocking of rooster signifies morning. The Kacharis abandoned the track, and the Ahoms immediately occupied it.

=== Conflict with Mungkang ===
It is related in one Buranji or Chronicle that there was a war between the Naras or Shans of Mungkang, and the king of Mantara or Burma. The Naras were defeated and they appealed for help from Suteupha, as the ruler of Mungkang and Suteupha’s father king Sukapha shares the same branch of Shan tribes. The rulers of Mungkang and the Ahom kings used to communicate with each other as Brother King. In all ancient Ahom chronicles, the Naras or the Shans of Mungkang are regarded by the Ahoms as their close kinsmen. In reply to the appeal for help made by the ruler of Mungkang, Suteupha stated that if the Nara king of Mungkang agrees to give his daughter in marriage with Suteupha, then he would send a force for the assistance of Mungkang. The Nara king declined to do so. A quarrel ensued and Suteupha sent an expedition against the Naras, but his troops suffered defeat and the Burhagohain, who commanded them, were defeated. The Borgohain was promptly dispatched with a second force, but, instead of fighting, he came to terms with the enemy. On his return, he was disgraced and imprisoned. He was subsequently forgiven on the intercession of the other nobles. Some Ahom historians claimed that no conflict occurred between Ahoms and Naras, during the reign of Suteupha and the incident described above happened during the reign of Sukhampha or Khora Raja.

== Death and legacy ==
Suteupha died in 1281 CE. Among his four sons, the eldest son Subinpha succeeded him as the king of Ahom kingdom. Suteupha followed the policy of expansion of his father’s kingdom. The manner in which he outwits the Kacharis and conquered the country which lies east to the Dikhou river, reveals that he had inherited his father, the king Sukapha’s wits and intelligence. The policy of expansion of Ahom kingdom will be followed by the later Ahom rulers and almost the entire Brahmaputra valley would come under their rule.

== See also ==
- Ahom Dynasty
- Nagaland
- Sibsagar district
- Kachari kingdom
- Myanmar
