= Subinpha =

Subinphaa
- Chaopha of Ahom Kingdom

Ahom King
- Reign: 1281 CE to 1293 CE
- Predecessor: Suteuphaa
- Successor: Sukhaangphaa
- Born: Ahom kingdom
- Died: c. 1293; Ahom kingdom
- Spouse: Hinguli
- Issue: Sukhaangphaa
- Dynasty: Ahom dynasty
- Father: Suteuphaa
- Religion: Ahom religion

Subinpha (1281–1293) was the third king of the Ahom kingdom.

During Subinpha's rule, the Ahoms divided themselves into the rulers and the ruled with the formal delineation of the Ahom nobility (Satgharia Ahoms) and the rest of the Ahoms identifying themselves with the rest of the population. Literally the Ahom of the Seven Houses, the nobility consisted of three state clans called Gohain (the royal, Burhagohain and Borgohain) and four priestly clans called Mo (Deodhai, Bailung, Mohan and Siring).
