= Sutupha =

King in late medieval India

Sutuphaa
- Chaopha of Ahom Kingdom

Ahom King
- Reign: 1369 CE to 1376 CE
- Predecessor: Sukhrangpha
- Successor: Tyao Khamti
- Born: Ahom kingdom
- Died: c. 1376; Ahom kingdom
- Dynasty: Ahom dynasty
- Father: Sukhaangphaa
- Religion: Ahom religion

Sutupha was the king of the Ahom kingdom in late medieval India from 1369 CE to 1376 CE. He ruled after an interregnum and historians differ regarding his year of accession, with some saying his rule began in 1364. His reign was marked by conflicts with the Sutiya kingdom, which later resulted in his treacherous murder by the Sutiyas.

== Ancestry and accession ==
Sutupha was the second son of Ahom king Sukhangpha. After the death of his father, his elder brother Sukhrangpha ascended the throne. After a reign of thirty-two years, Sukhrangpha died in 1364 CE. Historians differ from this point. While accounts of early historians stated that after the death of Sukhrangpha, his brother Sutupha directly ascended the throne in 1364 CE. But modern historians, Padmeswar Gogoi and S. L. Baruah stated that there was a period of interregnum after the death of Sukhrangpha, from 1364 CE and 1369 CE, thereby placing the year of Sutupha’s accession in 1369 CE.

== Reign and assassination ==
Sutupha wanted to expand the territory of Ahom kingdom. This led to frequent conflicts with neighbouring Sutiya kingdom. In 1376 CE, the Sutiya King visited Sutupha at Chapaguri, and, pretending to be reconciled, invited him to a regatta on the Safrai river. The Sutiya king enticed Sutupha on to his own barge without attendants, and there the Sutiyas treacherously murdered Sutupha. The Ahom soldiers accompanying Sutupha returned to the capital, bearing news of the unfortunate incident. A king assassinated in another kingdom would have immediately started a battle which evidently didn't take place. Moreover, nothing is mentioned about the forces which escorted the Ahom king who would have immediately taken necessary steps to protect their king or even launch a counter attack.

== Interregnum ==
After Sutupha's death, there was no prince whom the Ahom nobles thought worthy of the throne, and so, for four years (1376–1380 CE), Chao Phrongdam Burhagohain and Taphrikhin Borgohain carried on the administration themselves. In 1380 CE, finding it difficult to govern the country without a king, the nobles raised Sutupha's younger brother Tyao Khamti, the third son of Sukhangpha, to the throne.
