= Sukhrangpha =

Ahom king from 1332 to 1364

- Chaopha of Ahom Kingdom

Ahom king
- Reign: 1332–1364
- Predecessor: Sukhaangphaa
- Successor: Sutuphaa
- Born: Ahom Kingdom
- Died: c. 1364; Ahom Kingdom
- Dynasty: Ahom dynasty
- Father: Sukhaangphaa
- Religion: Ahom religion

Sukhrangpha or Tao Shukhampha was the king of Ahom kingdom from 1332 to 1364. He had to face the revolt led by his youngest brother Chao Pulai or Tai Sulai (there are confusion in Ahom historians whether Chao Pulai and Tai Sulai were same or different personality. Eventually he came in terms with Chao Pulai (or Tai Sulai) by appointing him as Charing Raja, a newly created official post to administer the region of Charing. Later the post of Charing Raja was usually conferred to the heir apparent to the throne. It can be compared with the title of Prince of Wales of England, where the heir apparent to the throne was conferred with this title.

== Ancestry and accession ==
Sukhranphaa was the eldest son of Ahom king Sukhaangphaa's four sons. After the death of his father, Sukhrangpha ascended the throne as the king of Ahom kingdom.

== Reign ==
At the onset of his reign, Sukhrangpha faced a serious threat from his youngest brother Chao Pulai (or Tai Sulai). Chao Pulai hatched a conspiracy to overthrow the regime of Sukhrangpha. The plot was detected, and Chao Pulai, being the son of Kamata princess Bhajani (some account says Rajani) fled to Kamata kingdom. The king of Kamata being the uncle of Chao Pulai came to his aid. Chao Pulai gathered his supporters and along with troops sent by his uncle, the king of Kamata, marched against Sukhranphaa. Sukhrangpha was alarmed with these developments. He already received intelligence that his regime was unpopular among certain sections of people and also he was not sure regarding the loyalty of his troops. Sukhrangpha, therefore, avoided confrontation and reconciled with Chao Pulai. He appointed Chao Pula as the Charing Raja, a newly created post to administer Charing, although the office was still located at the capital. During Ahom period in Assam, the heirs apparent to the throne were appointed as Charing Raja. The objective of this appointment was to let the prince gain some experience of administration, before finally ascending the throne. According to some historical accounts, the conspiracy of Chao Pulai was instigated by Chaopang Banduk Borgohain, while others say that it was him, who had poisoned the king's mind against Chao Pulai. But all agree that Chaopang Banduk Borgohain was the one to suffer, as he was dismissed from his office. His ultimate fate differ in different account, as some stated that Sukhrangpha had him executed for his crime while another account stated that Chaopang Banduk Borgohain escaped being put to death under the king's orders by concealing himself until the affair had blown over and later he was subsequently forgiven and taken back into favour. The remaining period of Sukhrangpha's reign was peaceful and without any major events. Eminent Assamese historian Gunaviram Barua stated in his documents that Sukhranphaa expanded his kingdom towards the bank of Brahmaputra river by defeating the neighbouring tribal chieftains.

== Death ==
Sukhrangpha died in 1364 CE after a reign of thirty-two years. Accounts differ regarding the events followed by his death. While earlier accounts claimed that after the death of Sukhrangpha, his brother Sutuphaa ascended the throne, later historians Padmeshwar Gogoi and S. L. Baruah claimed that Sukhrangpha's death was followed by a period of interregnum from 1364 CE to 1369 CE, before the nobles finally installed Sukhrangpha's brother Sutuphaa on the throne. Dr. Romesh Buragohain wrote about the reason for the first interregnum as Sukhrangpha died without leaving a male heir to succeed him, the nobles took advantage of it and instead of inviting Sutuphaa to the throne, they went for an interregnum.
