= Chumdeo =

Deity of Ahom people

Chumdeo, also known as Chum Phra Rung Mung or Chumpha, is a deity and the god of heaven in the Ahom religion. The Ahom kings worshipped it and kept it in the Deoghar at the royal palace. It was customary to hang Chumdeo around the new king’s neck at the Singarigharutha ceremony (coronation). It was given to the first Ahom king Sukaphaa by his maternal grandmother and brought to Assam with him. According to public belief, Chumdeo grants infinite wealth and with the deity in possession the enemy cannot win over. The size and shape of the Chumdeo is not much known though it is described to be a stone. According to some sources the shape of this stone is like a heron. It was kept in a small box in a golden seat. Chumdeo disappeared after the end of Ahom rule in Assam.

== Origin ==
According to legend, the king of heaven, Lengdon, entrusted Chumdeo to his brother's sons, Khun-lung and Khun-lai, to reign on the earth. Later, the statue of Chumdeo came into the hands of Sukapha's step-brother Sukhranpha. Sukapha’s maternal grandmother secretly handed over it to him on his way to Assam. The Ahoms did not worship idols. Hence, there is no statue of the deity as mentioned in their religious texts. However, members of the royal family kept two images, Chum and Seng. They were of bright colour (Rung) and presided over the country (mung). These images were also known as Chumdeo and Sengdeo. According to the Ahom religion, Chumdeo gave infinite wealth and had to be kept secret. Some scholars suggest that the heron-shaped Chum could also be a statue of the dragon in ancient China and Myanmar and that Seng could be a female dragon who accompanies Chum.
