= Birpal =

Birpal (also known as Gayapal, Bibar/Birbar) is the traditional founder of Chutia kingdom. He claimed descent from an ancestral king named Virmukka. As per the Assamese manuscripts, due to some misfortune(deva-dosha) Birpal had to settle down with 60 Chutia families in the foothills of a hill called Swarnagiri/Sonagiri in the year 1189 A.D.(1111 saka) where he assumed the title Gayapal. As per Chutia folklore, Birpal was an ardent worshiper of Kubera. It is believed that Kubera had come to his dream and foretold that a son would be born who would go on to become a great and benevolent king. Kubera gifted Birpal the royal heirlooms (golden cat, sword, shield and umbrella); which were found under a tree that he worshipped. Kubera also warned Birpal that if his descendants ever disrespected Kubera or the heirlooms, the umbrella would break and it would lead to their downfall. Birpal's son Ratnadhwajpal succeeded him, assuming the title of Gaudinarayan.
