= Sukhangpha =

Sukhaangphaa
- Chaopha of Ahom Kingdom

Ahom King
- Reign: 1293 CE to 1332 CE
- Predecessor: Subinphaa
- Successor: Sukhrangpha
- Born: Ahom kingdom
- Died: c. 1332; Ahom kingdom
- Spouse: Rajanee
- Issue: Sukhrangpha; Sutuphaa; Tyao Khamti
- Dynasty: Ahom dynasty
- Father: Subinphaa
- Religion: Ahom religion

Sukhangpha (fl. 1293–1332) was the 4th Ahom king.

== Reign ==
Under Sukhangpha, the Ahom kingdom entered into the first major conflict with their neighbors. The Ahom kingdom fought a long war, beginning about 1324, against the Kamata king. The war did not end in a win for either but concluded in a truce with Sukhangpha marrying princess of Kamatapur Rajani.

== Expedition against Kamateswar ==
Sukhanpha pursued an expedition against the Kamateswar. But the king Kamateswar made a treaty by giving two daughter of him to Sukhangpha. One of them was Rajani and another was Bhajani. He got four princes from Rajani. They are Sukhrangpha, Sutupha, Tyao Khamti and Tyao Chulai. From Bhajani, he got one prince. The name of the prince was Chao Pulai.

== See also ==
- Ahom Dynasty
