= Habung =

Historical Place of Assam

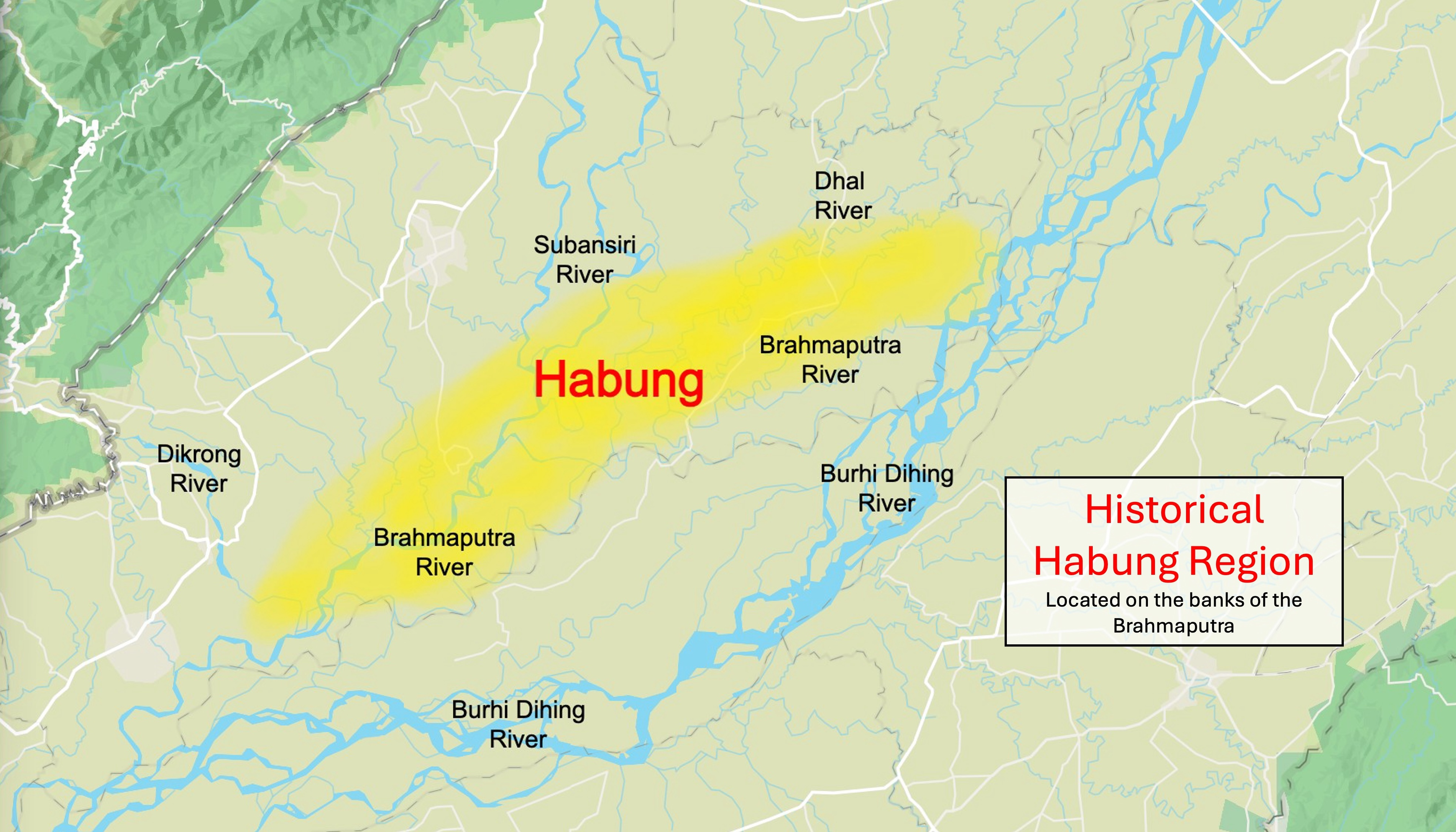
Historical map of Habung region as per historical sources.

Habung is a historical region in present-day Dhemaji district of Assam, it is a revered place of Tai-ahom . As per epigrahic records, Habung (Ha-vrnga-Vishaya) was a vishaya or province where Brahmins were settled by Ratna Pala of the Pala dynasty of Kamarupa in the 10th century, After the fall of Kamrupa, the region became part of Chutia kingdom where Chutia kings made land grants to Brahmins. Sukaphaa, the first Ahom king, is known to have spent three years in Habung before finally settling down at Charaideo in 1253.

== History ==
=== Early history ===
The earliest reference to Habung comes in the 10th century copper plate grant of Ratnapala of the Pala dynasty, when it was a province (visaya) of the Kamarupa Kingdom with Brahmin settlements. It is known that Sukaphaa, the Ahom king, spent a few years in Habung before finally settling down at Charaideo in 1253.

=== Medieval period ===
Copperplates of land grants made in this region are those by the Chutia kings, that date back to the year 1392 AD when king Satyanarayan donated 600 puti of land to a Brahman named "Narayan Dwij" at Dhenukhana. This was the time when the Ahom prince Sudangphaa was still living with his Brahmin foster family at Habung. The copper plate of Chutia king Dharmanarayan dated 1428 A.D. mentions Sri Vrihat-patra as Habung-aadhipati (lord of Habung). The plate records land grants of 400 puti given to a Brahmin named Purandar Vipra, indicating that Habung was a principality of the Chutia kingdom.

The land grant reads,

“Purandharai Viprai Bhuputinang Saturkhatam
Nripadeshata Samagatya Dadadi-Sashana Dadou-Habung-adhi”

— Copper plate dated to 1428 found in Chapakhowa, Sadiya(Scribe: Swarnakara Krishna Sadhu)

Suhungmung, the Ahom king, following an expansionist policy and annexed Panbari of Habung in 1512 AD, which was a part of the Chutia kingdom. The Chutia king Dhirnarayan attacked the Ahoms at Dikhoumukh the next year, but was unsuccessful. The Chutias again attacked the Ahoms in 1520 and occupied the areas up to Namdang and Mungkhrang.

The last copperplate recording a grant made in the region was issued by king Dhirnarayan in 1522 A.D. at a place known as Konwargaon (present-day Dhakuakhana) after which the region was finally annexed by the Ahom king Suhungmung in 1523 A.D.

This is the copper plate inscription for the 1522 land grant made by Dhirnarayan in Dhakuakhana or historic Habung

== Popular culture ==
The Habung region finds mention in several folk songs and tales. For instance, there is a Nisukoni geet (a form of lullaby) where the author talks about an old man (Habungia Burha) and a carpenter (Habungia Barhoi) from Habung.

"Haliki ei baper koloi gol,
Habungia burhar logot kah kubai gol.
.....
Habungia Barhoiye Charanao haje
Kurular keruhen uru uru kore,
Uribo nuwarihe sagarote pore."
