= Bakata =

Bakata was the capital of the Ahom kingdom (present-day Assam, Northeast India) established by the Ahom king Suhungmung (1497–1539) in the 16th-century. Since his capital was by the Dihing river, Suhungmung is also known as the Dihingia Raja. The next king, Suklenmung (1539–1552), moved the capital to Garhgaon.
