= Ahom dynasty =

Dynasty that ruled the Ahom kingdom in modern day Assam, India

Ahom dynasty (1228–1826 A.D.) and (1833–1838 A.D.) ruled the Ahom Kingdom in present-day Assam, India for nearly 600 years. The dynasty was established by Sukapha, a Shan prince of Mong Mao (present-day Shan State, Myanmar) who came to Assam after crossing the Patkai mountains. The rule of this dynasty ended with the Burmese invasion of Assam and the subsequent annexation by the British East India Company following the Treaty of Yandabo in 1826.

In external medieval chronicles the kings of this dynasty were called Asam Raja, whereas the subjects of the kingdom called them Chaopha, or Swargadeo (in Assamese).

== The kingdom and its administration ==
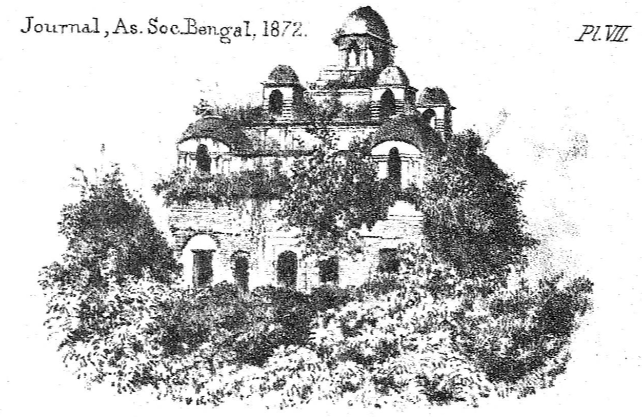
Garhgaon Kareng Ghar royal residence of Ahom kings, 1872.

The office of the Ahom king was reserved exclusively for the descendants of the first king Sukapha (1228–1268), who came to Assam from Mong Mao in 1228. Succession was by agnatic primogeniture. Nevertheless, following Rudra Singha’s deathbed injunction, four of his five sons became the king one after the other. The descendants of Sukapha were not eligible for ministerial positions—a division of power that was followed till the end of the dynasty and the kingdom. When the nobles asked Atan Burhagohain, the Premier, to become the king, the Tai priests rejected the idea and he desisted from ascending the throne.

The king could be appointed only with the concurrence of the patra mantris (council of ministers—Burhagohain, Borgohain, Borpatrogohain, Borbarua and Borphukan). During three periods in the 14th century, the kingdom had no kings when acceptable candidates were not found. The ministers could remove unacceptable kings, and it used to involve executing the erstwhile king. In the 17th century a power struggle and the increasing number of claimants to the throne resulted in kings being deposed in quick succession, all of whom were executed after the new king was instated. To prevent this bloody end, a new rule was introduced during the reign of Sulikphaa Lora Roja—claimants to the throne had to be physically unblemished—which meant that threats to the throne could be removed by merely slitting the ear of an ambitious prince. Rudra Singha, suspecting his brother Lechai's intention, mutilated and banished him. The problem of succession remained, and on his deathbed, he instructed that all his sons were to become kings. One of his sons, Mohanmala Gohain, was superseded, who went on to lead a rebel group during the Moamoria rebellion. The later kings and officers exploited the unblemished rule, leading to weak kings being instated. Kamaleswar Singha (2-year-old son of Kadam Dighala) and Purandar Singha (10-year-old son of Brajanath and one of the last kings of this dynasty) came into office because their fathers were mutilated.

The Ahom kings were given divine origin. According to Ahom tradition, Sukapha was a descendant of Khunlung, the grandson of the king of the heavens Leungdon, who had come down from the heavens and ruled Mong-Ri-Mong-Ram. During the reign of Suhungmung (1497–1539) which saw the composition of the first Assamese Buranji and increased Hindu influence, the Ahom kings were traced to the union of Indra (identified with Lengdon) and Syama (a low-caste woman), and were declared Indravamsa kshatriyas, a lineage created exclusively for the Ahoms. Suhungmung adopted the title Swarganarayan, and the later kings were called Swargadeo's (literal meaning: Lord of the Heavens). It was during his reign that the Buranji titled Sri Sri Swarganarayan Maharajor Jonmokotha was written wherein the source and lineage of the Ahom kings was connected to the Hindu God, Indra, Lord of the Heaven.

=== Coronation ===
The Swargadeo's coronation was called Singarigharutha, a ceremony that was performed first by Sudangpha (Bamuni Konwar) (1397–1407). The first coins in the new king's name were minted during the reign of Jayadhwaj Singha. Kamaleswar Singha (1795–1811) and Chandrakanta Singha's (1811–1818) coronations were not performed on the advice of Prime minister Purnananda Burhagohain, due to the financial constraints of State treasury caused by the internal disturbances during Moamoria rebellion. Kings who died in office were buried in vaults called Moidam, at Charaideo. Some of the later Maidams, beginning from the reign of Rajeswar Singha (1751–1769) were constructed to bury the ashes of those cremated.

On ascent, the king would generally assume an Ahom name decided by the Ahom priests. The name generally ended in Pha (Tai: Heaven), e.g. Susengpha. Later kings also assumed a Hindu name that ended in Singha (Assamese: Lion): Susengpha assumed the name Pratap Singha. Buranjis occasionally would refer to a past king by a more informal and colourful name that focused on a specific aspect of the king Pratap Singha was also known as Burha Roja (Assamese: Old King) because when Pratap Singha became the king, he was quite advanced in age.

=== Royal offices ===
Subinpha (1281–1293), the third Ahom king, delineated the Satghariya Ahom, the Ahom aristocracy of the Seven Houses. Of this, the first lineage was that of the king. The next two were the lineages of the Burhagohain and the Borgohain. The last four were priestly lineages. Sukhrangpha (1332–1364) established the position of Charing Raja which came to be reserved for the heir apparent. The first Charing Raja was Sukhramphaa's half-brother, Chao Pulai, the son of the Kamata princess Rajani, but who did not ultimately become the Swargadeo. Suhungmung Dihingia Raja (1497–1539) settled the descendants of past kings in different regions that gave rise to seven royal houses—Saringiya, Tipamiya, Dihingiya, Samuguriya, Tungkhungiya, Parvatiya and Namrupiya—and periods of Ahom rule came to be known after these families. The rule of the last such house, Tungkhungiya, was established by Gadadhar Singha (1681–1696) and his descendants ruled till the end of the Ahom kingdom.

=== Queens ===
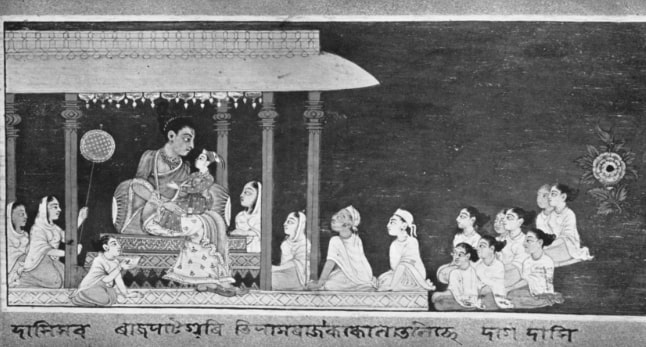
Bar Raja Ambika, queen regent of king Siva Singha.

Ahom queens (Kunworis) played important roles in the matter of state. They were officially designated in a gradation of positions, called the Bor Kuwori (Chief Queen), Parvatia Kuwori, Raidangia Kuwori, Tamuli Kuwori, etc. who were generally daughters of Ahom noblemen and high officials. Lesser wives of the Swargadeo were called Chamua Kunworis. Some of the queens were given separate estates that were looked after by state officials (Phukans or Baruas). During the reign of Siva Singha (1714–1744), the king gave his royal umbrella and royal insignia to his queens—Phuleshwari Kunwori, Ambika Kunwori and Anadari Kunwori in succession— to rule the kingdom. They were called Bor-Rojaa. Some queens maintained office even after the death or removal of the kings, as happened with Pakhori Gabhoru and Kuranganayani who were queens to multiple kings.

One way in which the importance of the queens can be seen is that many of them are named on coins; typically the king's name would be on the obverse of the coin and the queen's on the reverse.

=== Court influences ===
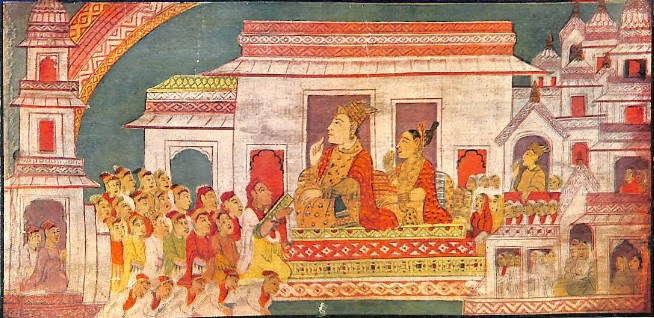
Ahom royal court, sitting on the throne king Siva Singha (left) and queen Ambika (right) receiving a copy of Ms. Dharma Purana from the author.

Sukapha's ruling deity was Chum-Pha and Sheng-mung a pair of non-Hindu, non-Buddhist gods, and he was accompanied by classes of priests called Deodhai, Bailung etc. But the Ahom kings let themselves be influenced by the religion and customs of those they ruled over. Sudangpha Bamuni Konwar (1397–1407) installed a Brahmin of Habung, in whose household he was born and raised, as his adviser, but he himself did not convert to Hinduism. Susenpha (1439–1488) constructed a temple at Negheriting. Suhungmung Dihingia Rojaa (1497–1539) was the first Ahom king to expand the kingdom and the polity, allow Assamese influence in his court and accept a non-Ahom title—Swarganarayan. Sukhampha Khora Rojaa (1552–1603) began consulting Hindu astrologers alongside the traditional Deodhai-Bailung priests, and Pratap Singha (1603–1641) installed 13 Brahmin families as diplomats. Assamese language coexisted with Tai language in the court till the reign of Pratap Singha, during whose rule Assamese became dominant. Jayadhwaj Singha (1648–1663) was the first Ahom king to be initiated into the Mahapuruxiya Dharma, and Ahom kings till Sulikpha lora roja (1679–1681) continued to be disciples of one sattra or the other. Mahapuruxiya pontiffs belonging to different sects began playing a greater role in state politics. After the chaos of the late 17th century, Gadadhar Sinha (1681–1696), the first Tungkhungiya king began his rule with a deep distrust of these religious groups. His son and successor Rudra Singha (1696–1714) searched for an alternative state religion, and his son and successor Siva Singha (1714–1744) formally adopted Saktism, the nemesis of the Mahapuruxiya sects. The persecution of the Mahapuruxiya Sattras under the Tunkhungiya rulers following Siba Singha was a crucial factor leading to the Moamoria rebellion that greatly depleted the Ahom kingdom.

=== King's Guards ===
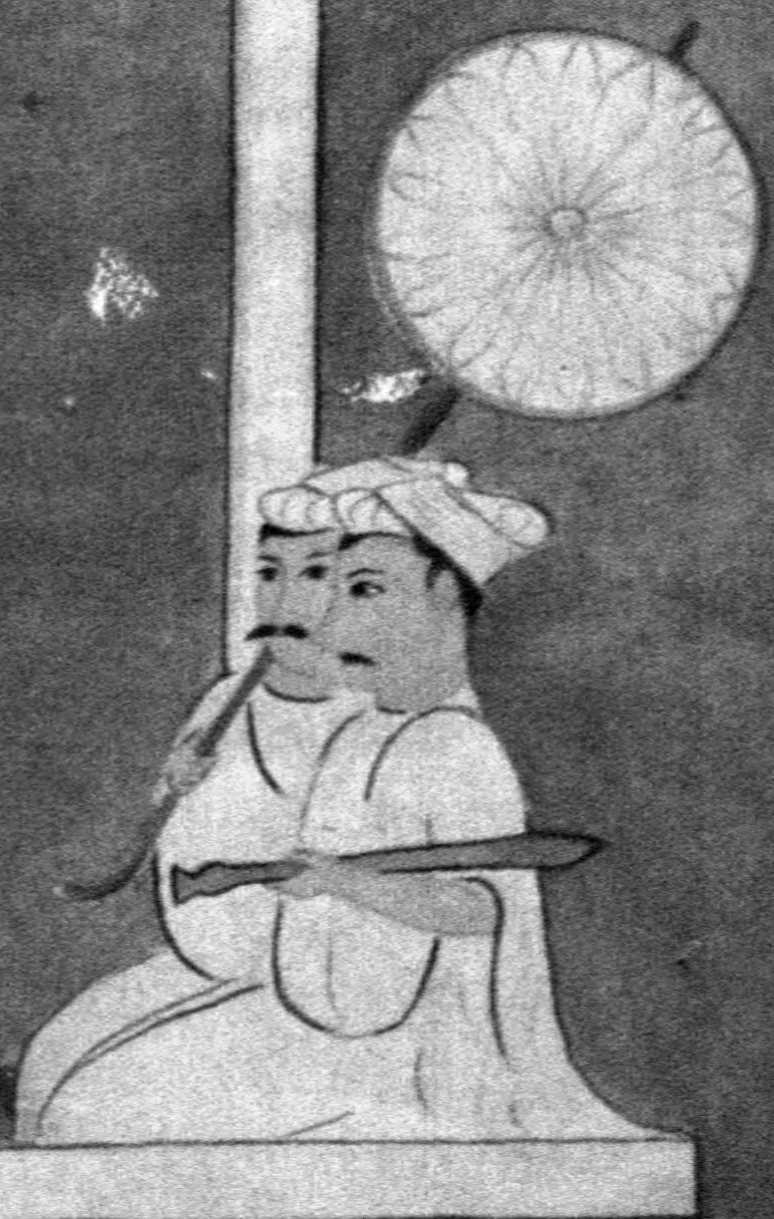
Bodyguards (Chaudang)of Ahom kings.

The king was guarded by a six thousand strong household troop under a Bhitarual Phukan. A unit of musketeers consisting of the king's relatives was established by Sukhampha alias Khora Raja that protected the capital (under the Bajua Hilaidari Konwar) and the palace and environs (Bhitarual Hilaidari Konwar).

The protection of the king was strictly taken into measure. Several classes of highly trusted guards were entrusted with the duty of protecting the king, which were duly supervised by the superior officers. (i) Hendangdhara or persons wielding hengdang were the personal bodyguards of the king, (ii) Chabukdhara, wielding whip, preceded the king whenever he moved out. (iii) Da-dhara or guards holding swords accompanied the king on his side. (iv) Dangdhara or guards carrying baton, moved around the side of the king.

=== Patronage to Art ===
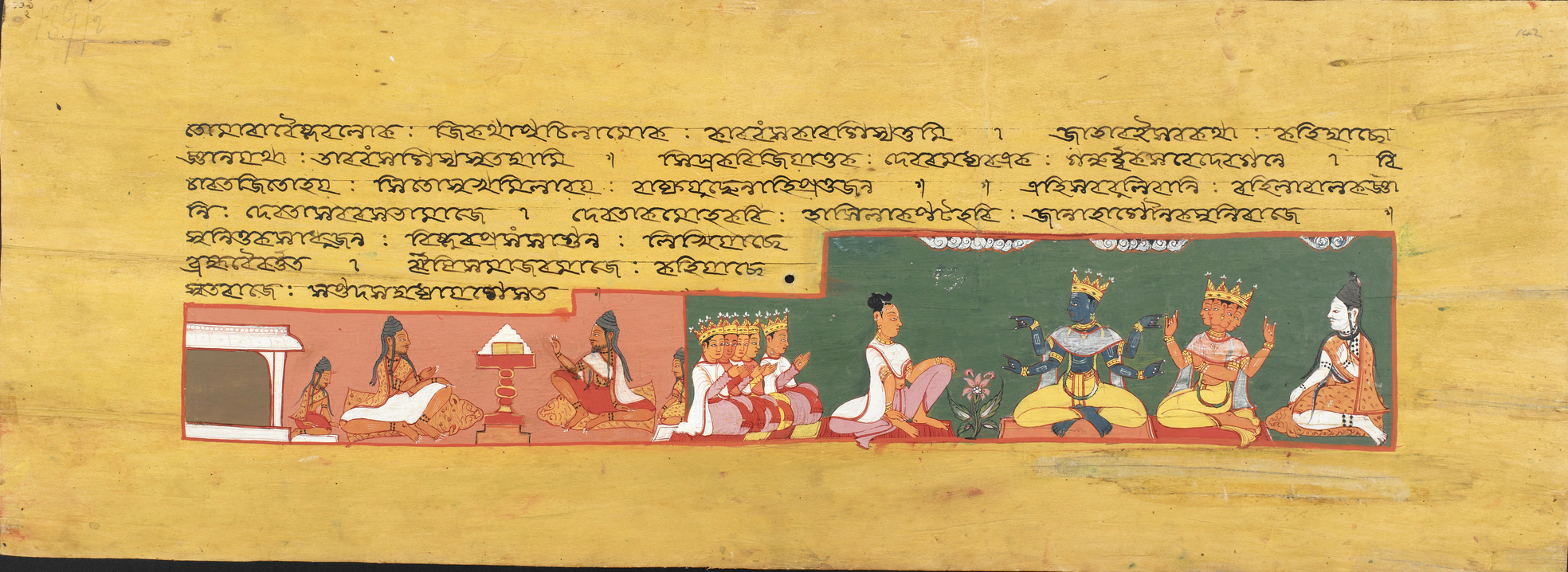
Ms. Brahma Vaivarta Purna, reproduced at the patronage of Ahom king Purandar Singha in 1836.

The Ahom kings particularly of the tungkhungia house were great patrons of art, they encouraged the art of manuscript painting. Under their patronage, a great number of highly illustrated manuscripts were produced and a new school of art emerged as the 'Garhgaon school'. This school of art broke away from the already existing 'Sattriya school', with much secular influence. Richly illustrated manuscripts such as– Gita Govinda, Dharma Purana, Sankachura Vadh, Hastividyarnava, Ananda Lahiri, Bhagavata Purana VI, Brhamavaivarta Purana, etc., are all products of the royal court.

== List of rulers ==
In the nearly 600-years 39-Swargadeo dynastic history, there are three progenitor kings (all subsequent kings are descendants of these kings). They are Sukapha, who established the kingdom; Suhungmung, who made the greatest territorial and political expansion of the kingdom; and Gadadhar Singha, who established the House of Tungkhugia kings that reigned the kingdom during its political and cultural zenith, as well as the period of decay and end (except for Jogeswar Singha, who was a descendant of Gadadhar Singha's father Gobar, and who was installed as a puppet king by the Burmese).

The dynastic history and dates that are accepted today are the result of a re-examination of Ahom and other documents by a team of Nora astronomers and experts who were commissioned to do so by Gaurinath Singha (1780–1795).

The list of Swargadeos of the Ahom Kingdom
Years	Reign	Ahom name	Other names	succession	End of reign	Capital
1228–1268	40y	Sukapha			natural death	Charaideo
1268–1281	13y	Suteupha		son of Sukapha	natural death	Charaideo
1281–1293	8y	Subinpha		son of Suteupha	natural death	Charaideo
1293–1332	39y	Sukhangpha		son of Subinpha	natural death	Charaideo
1332–1364	32y	Sukhrangpha		son of Sukhangpha	natural death	Charaideo
1364–1369	5y	Interregnum				
1369–1376	7y	Sutupha		brother of Sukhrangpha	assassinated	Charaideo
1376–1380	4y	Interregnum				
1380–1389	9y	Tyao Khamti		brother of Sutupha	assassinated	Charaideo
1389–1397	8y	Interregnum				
1397–1407	10y	Sudangpha	Baamuni Konwar	son of Tyao Khamti	natural death	Charagua
1407–1422	15y	Sujangpha		son of Sudangpha	natural death	
1422–1439	17y	Suphakpha		son of Sujangpha	natural death	
1439–1488	49y	Susenpha		son of Suphakpha	natural death	
1488–1493	5y	Suhenpha		son of Susenpha	assassinated	
1493–1497	4y	Supimpha		son of Suhenpha	natural death	
1497–1539	42y	Suhungmung	Swarganarayan, Dihingiaa Rojaa I	son of Supimpha	assassinated	Bakata
1539–1552	13y	Suklenmung	Garhgayaan Rojaa	son of Suhungmung	natural death	Garhgaon
1552–1603	51y	Sukhampha	Khuraa Rojaa	son of Suklenmung	natural death	Garhgaon
1603–1641	38y	Susengpha	Pratap Singha, Burhaa Rojaa, Buddhiswarganarayan	son of Sukhampha	natural death	Garhgaon
1641–1644	3y	Surampha	Jayaditya Singha, Bhogaa Rojaa	son of Pratap Singha	deposed	Garhgaon
1644–1648	4y	Sutyinpha	Noriyaa Rojaa	brother of Surampha	deposed	Garhgaon
1648–1663	15y	Sutamla	Jayadhwaj Singha, Bhoganiyaa Rojaa	son of Sutyinpha	natural death	Garhgaon/Bakata
1663–1670	7y	Supungmung	Chakradhwaj Singha	cousin of Jayadhwaj Singha	natural death	Bakata/Garhgaon
1670–1672	2y	Sunyatpha	Udayaditya Singha	brother of Chakradhwaj Singha	deposed	
1672–1674	2y	Suklampha	Ramadhwaj Singha	brother of Udayaditya Singha	poisoned	
1674–1675	21d	Suhung	Samaguria Rojaa Khamjang	Samaguria descendant of Suhungmung	deposed	
1675-1675	24d		Gobar Raja	great-grandson of Suhungmung	deposed	
1675–1677	2y	Sujinpha	Arjun Konwar, Dihingia Rojaa II	grandson of Pratap Singha, son of Namrupian Gohain	deposed, suicide	
1677–1679	2y	Sudaipha	Parvatia Rojaa	great-grandson of Suhungmung	deposed, killed	
1679–1681	3y	Sulikpha	Ratnadhwaj Singha, Loraa Rojaa	Samaguria family	deposed, killed	
1681–1696	15y	Supatpha	Gadadhar Singha	son of Gobar Raja	natural death	Borkola
1696–1714	18y	Sukhrungpha	Rudra Singha	son of Gadadhar Singha	natural death	Rangpur
1714–1744	30y	Sutanpha	Siva Singha	son of Rudra Singha	natural death	
1744–1751	7y	Sunenpha	Pramatta Singha	brother of Siva Singha	natural death	
1751–1769	18y	Surempha	Rajeswar Singha	brother of Pramatta Singha	natural death	
1769–1780	11y	Sunyeopha	Lakshmi Singha	brother of Rajeswar Singha	natural death	
1780–1795	15y	Suhitpangpha	Gaurinath Singha	son of Lakshmi Singha	natural death	Jorhat
1795–1811	16y	Suklingpha	Kamaleswar Singha	great-grandson of Lechai, the brother of Rudra Singha	natural death, smallpox	Jorhat
1811–1818	7y	Sudingpha (1)	Chandrakanta Singha (1)	brother of Kamaleswar Singha	deposed	Jorhat
1818–1819	1y		Purandar Singha (1)	descendant of Suremphaa	deposed	Jorhat
1819–1821	2y	Sudingpha (2)	Chandrakanta Singha (2)		fled the capital	
1821–1822	1y		Jogeswar Singha	5th descendant of Jambor, the brother of Gadadhar Singha. Jogeswar was brother of Hemo Aideo, and was puppet of Burmese ruler	removed	
1833–1838			Purandar Singha (2)			

=== Family tree ===
Ahom dynasty

Sukaphaa^{(1)} r. 1228-1268
Suteuphaa^{(2)} r. 1268-1281
Subinphaa^{(3)} r. 1281-1293
Sukhaangphaa^{(4)} r. 1293-1332
Sukhrangpha^{(5)} r. 1332-1364	Sutuphaa^{(6)} r. 1369-1376	Tyao Khamti^{(7)} r. 1380-1387
Sudangphaa^{(8)} r. 1397-1407
Sujangphaa^{(9)} r. 1407-1422
Suphakphaa^{(10)} r. 1422-1439
Susenphaa^{(11)} r. 1439-1488
Suhenphaa^{(12)} r. 1488-1493
Supimphaa^{(13)} r. 1493-1497
Suhungmung^{(14)} r. 1497-1539
Charingia; Branch	Samuguria; Branch	Tungkhungia; Branch	Parvatia; Branch
Suklenmung^{(15)} r. 1539-1552	Sureng; Deoraja	Suteng; Namrupia; Raja	Parvatia; Deka Raja
Sukhaamphaa^{(16)} r. 1552-1603	Namrupia; Raja	Narayan; Tipam Raja	Suhung^{(24)} r. 1674-1675	Saranga; Gohain	Chukrang; Konwar
Susenghphaa^{(17)} r. 1603-1641	Supangmung^{(21)} r. 1663-1670	Sunyatphaa^{(22)} r. 1670-1672	Suklamphaa^{(23)} r. 1672-1674	Son of Narayan; Tipam Raja	Gobar Roja^{(25)} r. 1675	Sudoiphaa^{(27)} r. 1677-1679
Suramphaa^{(18)} r. 1641-1644	Sutingphaa^{(19)} r. 1644-1648	Namrupia; Raja Tailai	Sulikphaa^{(28)} r. 1679-1681	Supatphaa^{(29)} r. 1681-1696	Jambor Gohain Charing Raja
Sutamla^{(20)} r. 1648-1663	Sujinphaa^{(26)} r. 1675-1677	Sukhrungphaa^{(30)} r. 1696-1714	Lechai; Namrupia; Raja	Sriram
Sutanphaa^{(31)} r. 1714-1744	Sunenphaa^{(32)} r. 1744-1751	Suremphaa^{(33)} r. 1751-1769	Sunyeophaa^{(34)} r. 1769-1780	Ayusut	Langal
Ratneswar; Saru Gohain	Suhitpangphaa^{(35)} r. 1780-1795	Kadamdighala; Gohain	Pirika
Bijoy; Barmura; Gohain	Suklingphaa^{(36)} r. 1795-1811	Sudingphaa^{(37)} r. 1811-1818, 1819-1821	Baga; Konwar; Tipam Raja
Brajanath; Gohain	Jogeswar; Singha^{(39)} r. 1821-1822
Purandar; Singha^{(38)} r. 1818-1819, 1833-1838
