= Charaideo =

UNESCO World Heritage Site in Assam, India

Charaideo Che-Rai-Doi
- Historical city
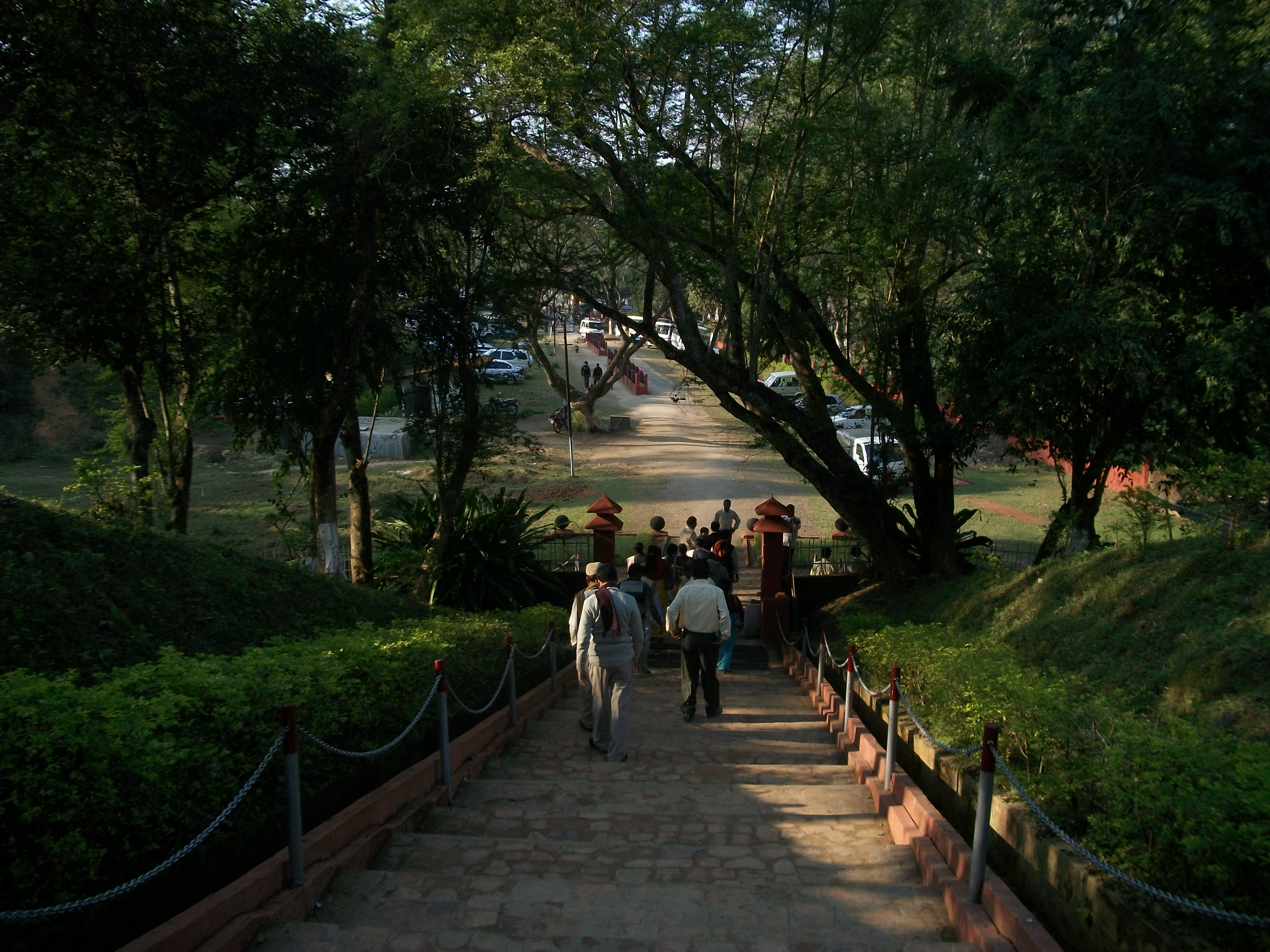
- Mausoleum of Ahom royals buried in Charaideo

- Location in Assam, India Charaideo (India)
- Coordinates: 26°56′31″N 94°52′34″E
- Country: India
- State: Assam
- District: Charaideo
- Capital, Ahom Kingdom: Traditionally c. 1253; 773 years ago
- Founder: Sukaphaa

Languages
  - Official: Assamese
- Time zone: UTC+5:30 (IST)
- ISO 3166 code: IN-AS
- Vehicle registration: AS

Charaideo or Che-Rai-Doi (Literally: the shining city on the hills in Ahom language) is a historic town situated in Charaideo district, Assam, India. As per conventional chronology, Charaideo was established by the first Ahom king Sukaphaa in the year 1253 CE as the first capital of the Ahom kingdom. Even though the capital was shifted to different cities over the course of Ahom rule, Charaideo remained the symbolic centre of Ahom power in Assam. It is now famous for its vast collection of maidams (tumuli) which are the burial mounds of the ruling Ahom kings and members of the Ahom royalty. It is located about 30 km from Sivasagar town in Charaideo district.

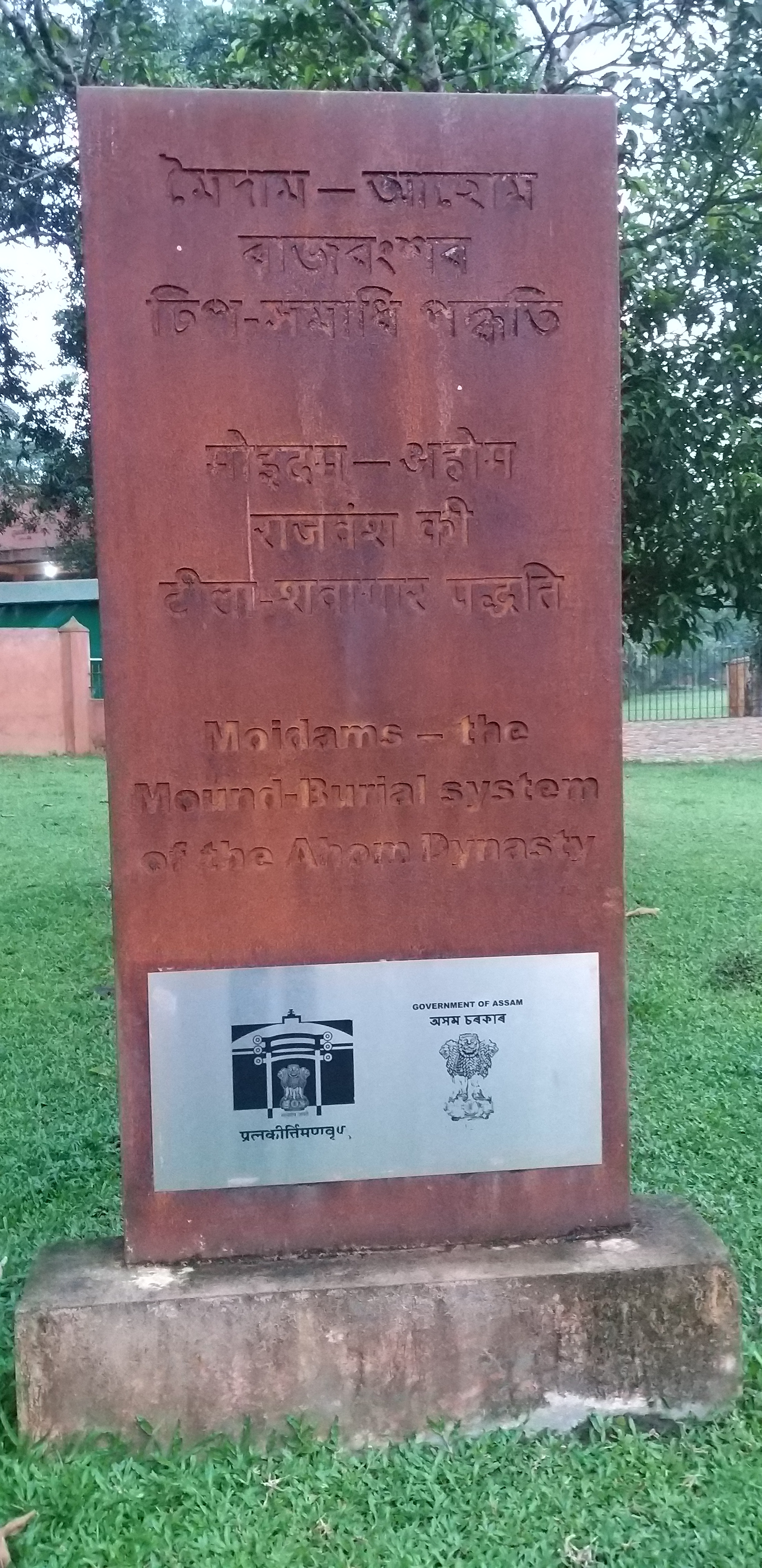
Charaideo Maidams,Assam

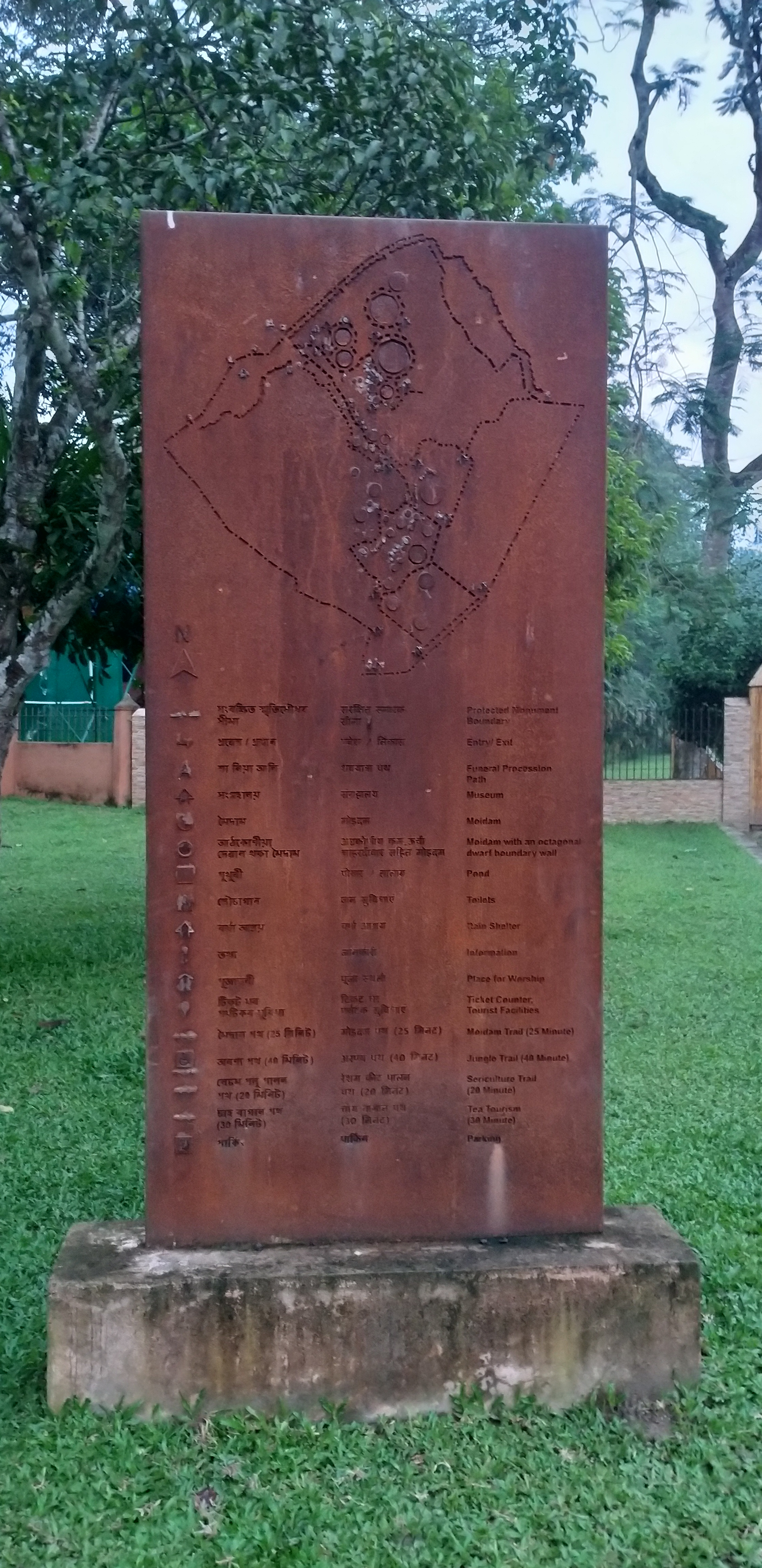
Charaideo Maidams site map,Assam

== Etymology ==
Charaideo (also Ahom: Che-Rai-Doi; Charai-khorong), was the permanent settlement of the first Ahom king Chaolung Sukaphaa. It was earlier referred to as Che-Tam-Doi-Phi (literally City-Hill-God) meaning "city of the sacred hill". The name Charaideo originated from Tai-Ahom word Che Rai Doi or Doi Che Rai which means the shining city on the hills. The word Che-Rai-Doi became Charaideo or Charai-khorong in Assamese. According to the Tai-Bailung-Mohong Buranji (a manuscript in Tai), King Sukaphaa was buried in his capital city Che-Rai-Doi.

== History ==
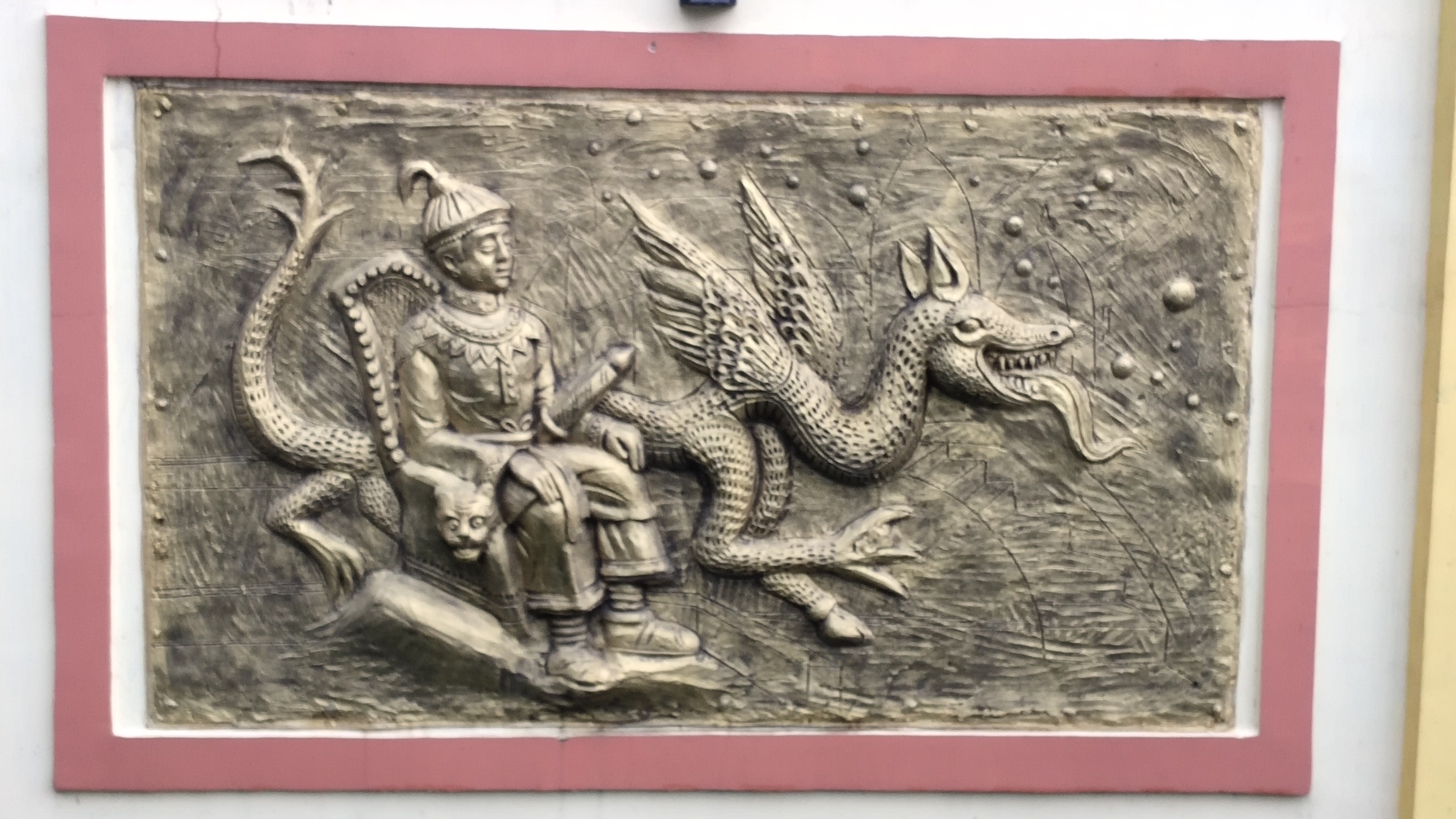
Wall carving of Sukaphaa

Before the arrival of Sukaphaa the place was a place of worship for local tribes like Moran and Borahi. Though the capital of the Ahom kingdom moved many times, Charaideo remained the symbolic center. It contains sacred burial grounds of Ahom kings and queens and is also the place of ancestral Gods of the Ahoms. The Ahom kings and Queens were buried after extensive and long royal burial rituals. The tombs (Maidam) of Ahom kings and queens at Charaideo hillocks resemble the shape of the pyramids and are objects of wonder revealing the excellent architecture and skill of the sculptors and masons of Assam of the medieval days.

The actual number of Maidam were more than 150 but only 30 Maidams are protected by the Archaeological Survey of India and Assam State Archaeology Department, and the remaining Maidams are unprotected. Most of these unprotected Maidams are encroached by people and getting damaged. The biggest unprotected Maidam is the Bali Maidam near Nimonagarh. This Maidam is called Bali Maidam, because while British plundered it, they got obstruction from excess sand (bali) in the surrounding of the Maidam.

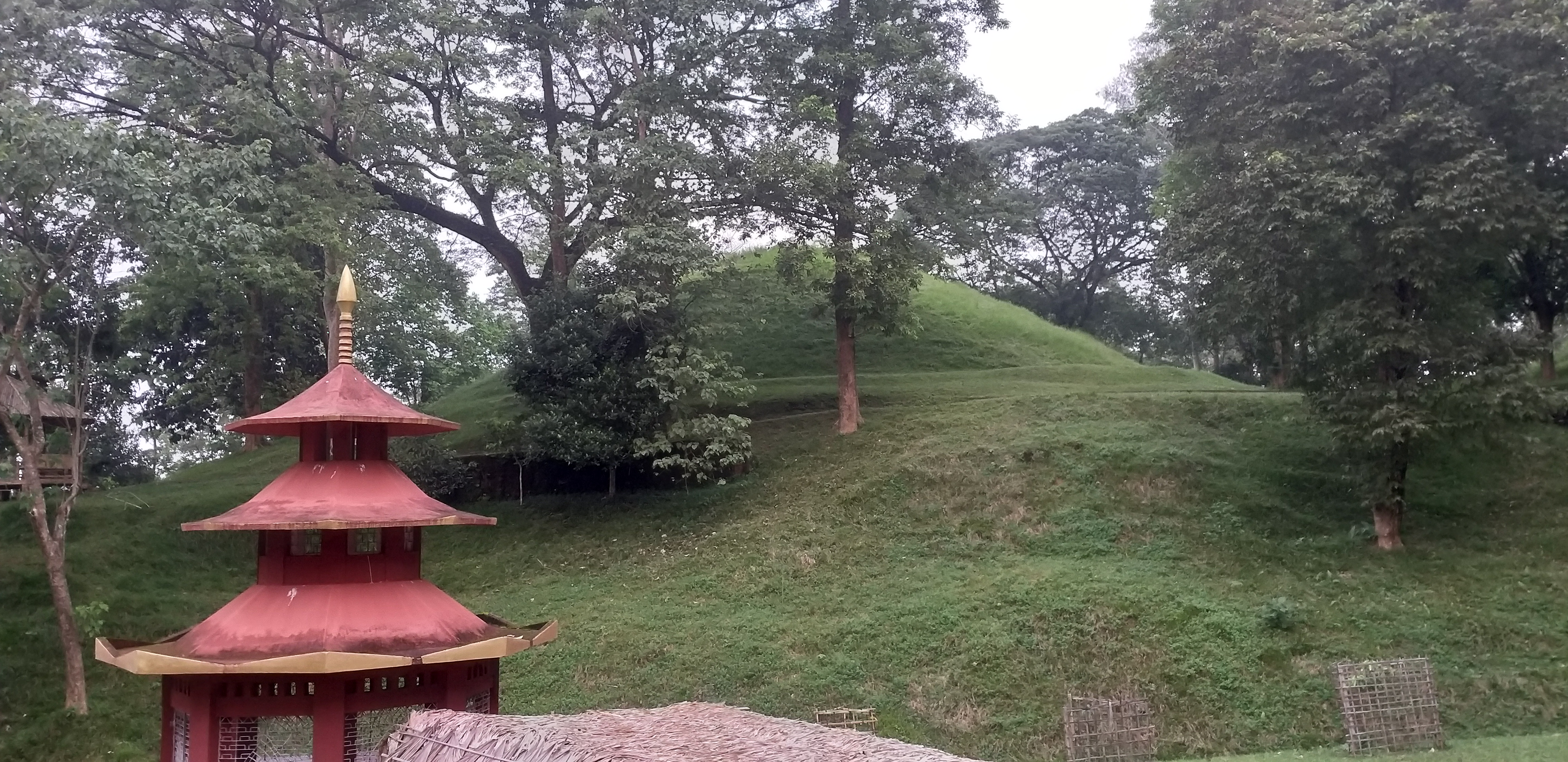
Charaideo Maidams ,Assam

== Nomination for UNESCO World Heritage Site ==
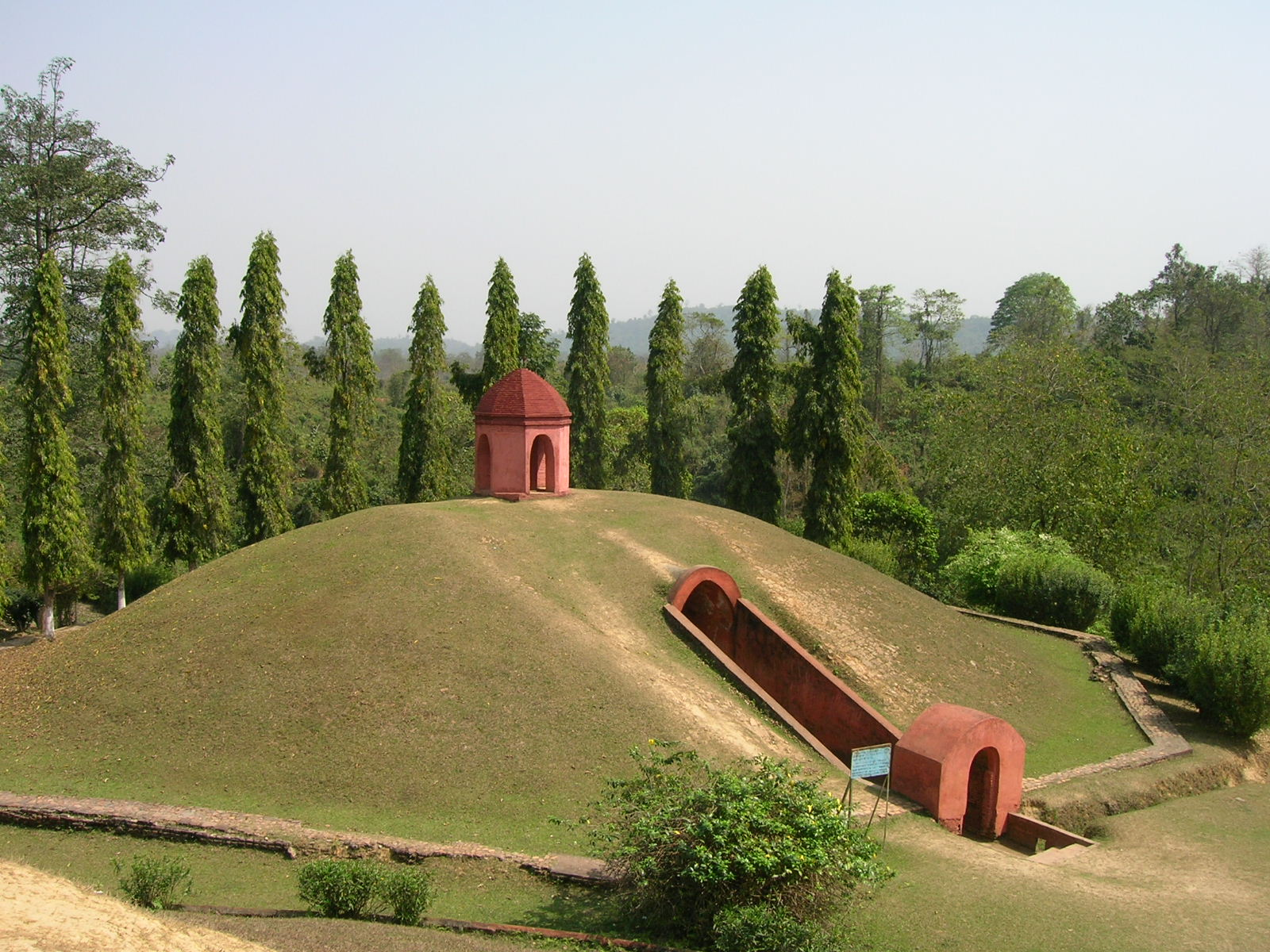
Maidam of a Ahom king at Charaideo

In 2023 Prime Minister Narendra Modi chose the Maidams for a UNESCO nomination as a World Heritage Site. The site was formally recognised as such on 26 July 2024.

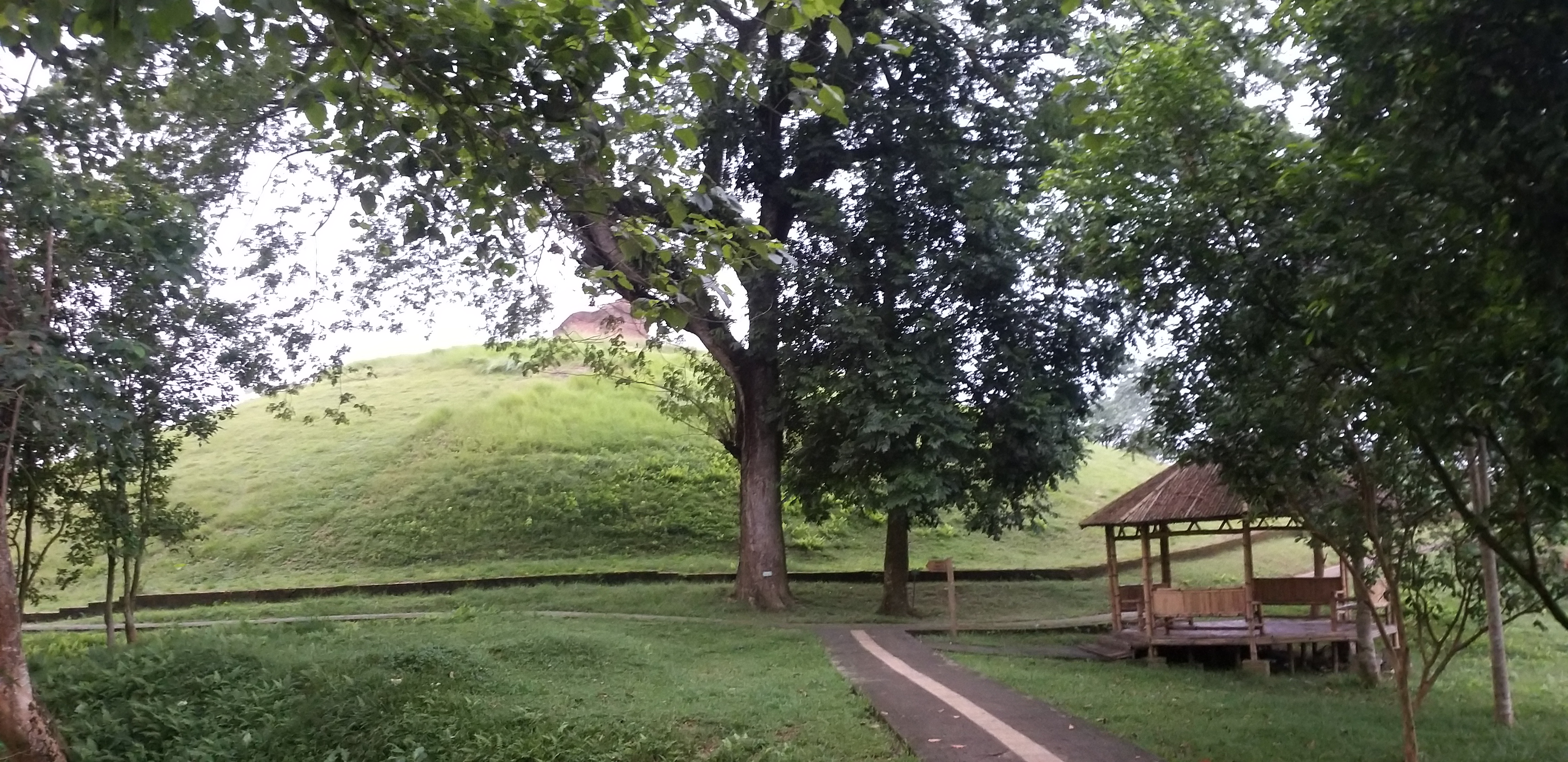
Charaideo Maidams,Assam

== See also ==
- Sukaphaa
- Ahom Kingdom
- Singarigharutha
- Ahom Dynasty
- Sibsagar district
- Charaideo district
