= Chutia kingdom =

Medieval state of India

- Unknown (before the founding of Ahom state)–1523-24
- Chutia kingdom (Tiwra) in early 16th century
- Capital: Sadhayapura
- Common languages: Assamese language Deori language
- Religion: Hinduism; Tribal religion
- Government: Monarchy
- Monarch
  - Unknown–1523-24: Dhirnarayana (last)
- Historical era: Medieval Assam
  - Established: Unknown (before the founding of Ahom state)
  - Ahom-Chutiya conflict: 1513 – 17th century
  - Disestablished: 1523-24
Preceded by	Succeeded by
Kamarupa	Ahom kingdom
- Today part of: India

Rulers of Chutia kingdom
- Part of History of Assam

Rulers known from Inscriptions
- Nandisvara: late 14th century
- Satyanarayana: late 14th century
- Lakshminarayana: early 15th century
- Dharmanarayana: early 15th century
- Durlabhnarayana: early 15th century
- Muktadharmanarayana: mid 15th century
- Pratyakshanarayana: mid 15th century
- Yasanarayana: mid 15th century
- Purandarnarayana: late 15th century
- Dhirnarayana: unknown - 1524

Chutia monarchy data
- Capitals of the Kingdom; Sadhyapura
- Royal Flag; Mayuradhwaja
- Coat of Arms; Singha
- Royal Heirlooms; Gold and Silver Cat (Mekuri); Gold and Silver Umbrella (Danda-Chhatra); Gold and Silver Bedstead (Sal-pira)
- Royal Throne; Sunuwali Tinisukia Singhakhana
- Royal residence; Kundilnagara/Barnagar
- Tutelary deity; Kechai-khati

The Chutia kingdom (also Sadiya) (Pron: /ˈsʊðiːjɑː/ or Sutia) was a late medieval state that developed around Sadiya in present Assam and adjoining areas in Arunachal Pradesh. It extended over almost the entire region of present districts of Lakhimpur, Dhemaji, Tinsukia, and parts of Dibrugarh in Assam, as well as the plains and foothills of Arunachal Pradesh. The kingdom fell around the year 1523-24 to the Ahom Kingdom after a series of conflicts and the capital area ruled by the Chutia rulers became the administrative domain of the office of Sadia Khowa Gohain of the Ahom kingdom.

The Chutia kingdom, believed to be founded in the early 13th century around Sadiya and contiguous areas, came into prominence in the second half of the 14th century, and was one among several rudimentary states (Ahom, Dimasa, Koch, Jaintia etc.) that emerged from tribal political formations in the region after the fall of Kamarupa kingdom, between the 13th and the 16th century. Among these, the Chutia state was the most advanced, with its rural industries, trade, surplus economy and advanced Sanskritisation. It is not exactly known as to the system of agriculture adopted by the Chutias, but it is believed that they were settled cultivators. After the Ahoms annexed the kingdom in 1523-24, the Chutia state & its population was absorbed into the Ahom kingdom through Ahomisation — the nobility and the professional classes were given important positions in the Ahom officialdom and the land was resettled for wet rice cultivation.

== Foundation and Polity ==
Though there is no doubt on the Chutia polity, the origins of this kingdom are obscure. It is generally held that the Chutias, a grouping of different Bodo-Kachari cognate groups, established a state in the plains around Sadiya before the advent of the Ahoms in 1228. Though Buranjis, the Ahom chronicles, indicate the presence of a Chutia state the evidence is scarce that it was of any significance before the second half of the 14th century.

The earliest Chutia king in the epigraphic records is Nandin or Nandisvara, from the latter half of the 14th century, mentioned in a grant by his son Satyanarayana who nevertheless draws his royal lineage from Asuras in his mother's side who were "enemies of the gods". The mention of Satyanarayana as having the shape of his maternal uncle (which is also an indirect reference to the same Asura/Daitya lineage) may also constitute evidence of matrilineality of the Chutia ruling family, or that their system was not exclusively patrilineal. On the other hand, a later king Durlabhnarayana mentions that his grandfather Ratnanarayana (identified with Satyanarayana) was the king of Kamatapura which might indicate that the eastern region of Sadhaya was politically connected to the western region of Kamata.

In these early inscriptions, the kings are said to be seated in Sadhyapuri, identified with the present-day Sadiya; which is why the kingdom is also called Sadiya. The Buranjis written in the Ahom language called the kingdom Tiora whereas those written in the Assamese language called it Chutia.

Brahmanical influence in the form of Vaishnavism reached the Chutia polity in the eastern extremity of present-day Assam during the late fourteenth century. Vaishnava Brahmins created lineages for the rulers with references to Krishna legends but placed them lower in the Brahminical social hierarchy because of their autochthonous origins. Though asura lineage of the Chutia rulers have similarities with the Narakasura lineage created for the three Kamarupa dynasties, the precise historical connection is not clear. Although a majority of the Brahmin donees of the royal grants were Vaishnavas, the rulers patronized the non-brahmanised Dikkaravasini (also Tamresvari or Kechai-khati), which was either a powerful tribal deity, or a form of the Buddhist deity Tara adopted for tribal worship. This deity, noticed in the 10th century Kalika Purana well before the establishment of the Chutia kingdom, continued to be presided by a Deori priesthood well into the Ahom rule and outside Brahminical influence.

=== Spurious accounts ===
Although there are many manuscript accounts of the origin and lineage, these do not agree with each other and are legendary in nature, and therefore have no historical moorings. One such source is Chutiyar Rajar Vamsavali, first published in Orunodoi in 1850 and reprinted in Deodhai Asam Buranji. Historians consider this document to have been composed in the early 19th century—to legitimize the Matak rajya around 1805—or after the end of Ahom rule in 1826. This document relates the legend of Birpal. Yet another Assamese document, retrieved by Ney Elias from Burmese sources, relates an alternative legend of Asambhinna. These different legends suggest that the genealogical claims of the Chutias have changed over time and that these are efforts to construct (and reconstruct) the past.

== Rulers ==
Only a few recently compiled Buranjis provide the history of the Chutia kingdom; though some sections of these compilations are old, the sections that contain the list of Chutiya rulers cannot be traced to earlier than 19th century and scholars have shown great disdain for these accounts and legends.

Neog (1977) compiled a list of rulers from epigraphic records based crucially on identifying the donor-ruler named Dharmanarayan, mentioned as the son of Satyanarayana in the Bormurtiya grant with the Dharmanarayan, the father of the donor-ruler Durlabhnarayana of the Chepakhowa grant. This effectively results in identifying Satyanarayana with Ratnanarayana.

List of Rulers
Name	Other names	Reign Period	Reign in Progress
Nandi	Nandisara or Nandisvara	late 14th century	
Satyanarayana	Ratnanarayana	late 14th century	1392
Lakshminarayana	Dharmanarayana	early 15th century	1392; 1401;
Durlabhnarayana		early 15th century	1428
Muktadharmanarayana		mid 15th century	1442
Pratyaksanarayana			
Yasanarayana			

A late discovery of an inscription, published in a 2002 souvenir of the All Assam Chutiya Sanmilan seems to genealogically connect the last historically known king, Dhirnarayan with Neog's list above.

List of Additional Rulers
Name	Other names	Reign Period	Reign in progress
Yasamanarayana			
Purandarnarayana		late 15th century	
Dhirnarayana		early 16th century	1522

Though it is accepted that the rule of the Chutia rulers ended in 1523-24, different sources give different accounts. The extant Ahom Buranji and the Deodhai Asam Buranji mention that in the final battles and the aftermath both the king and his son; whereas Ahom Buranji-Harakanta Barua mentions that the remnant of the royal family was deported to Pakariguri, Darrang.

== Domain ==
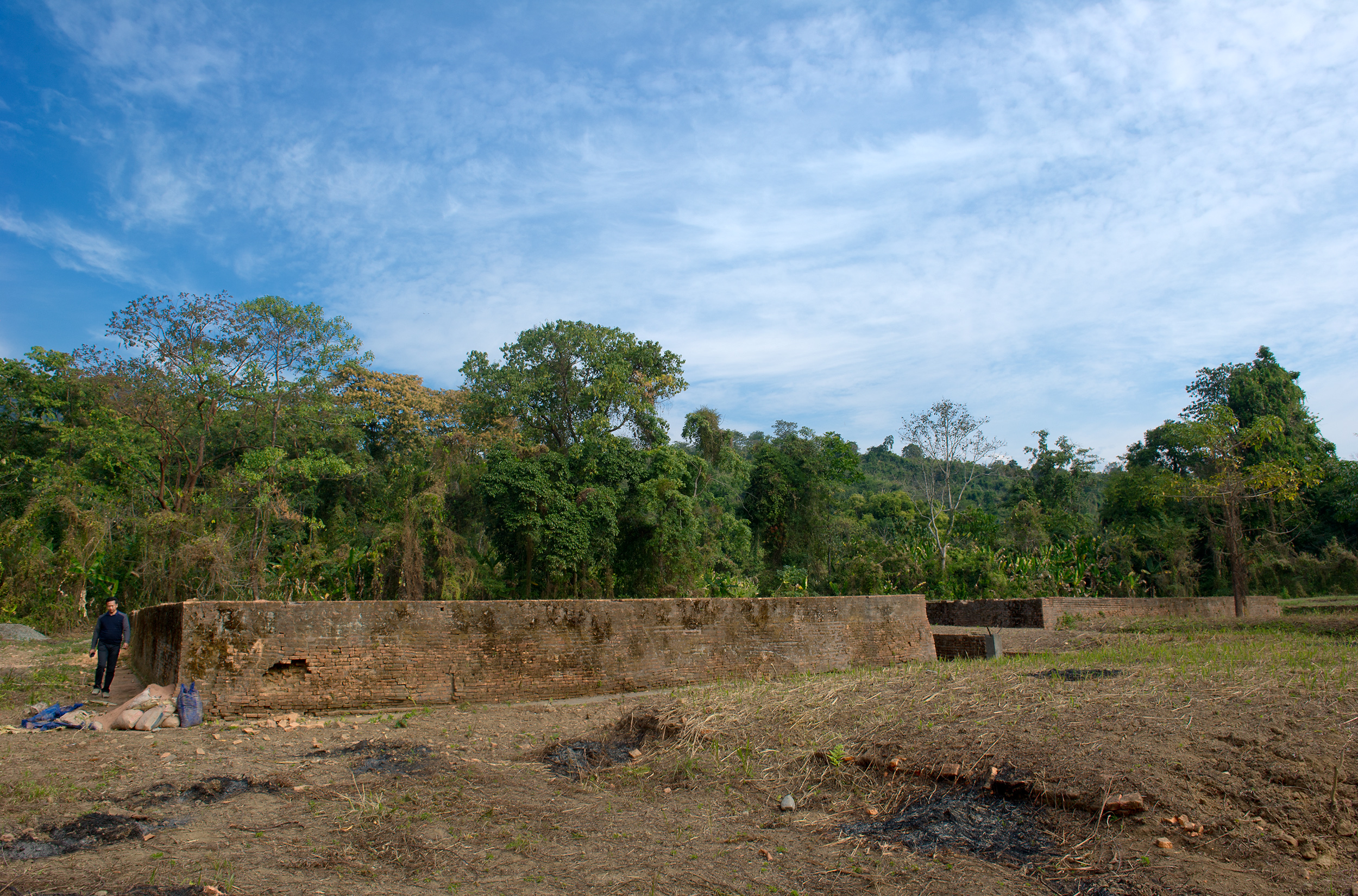
Ruins of the Chutia kingdom near Dibang Valley of Arunachal Pradesh

The extent of the power of the kings of the Chutia kingdom is not known in detail. Nevertheless, it is estimated by most modern scholarship that Chutias held the areas on the north bank of Brahmaputra from Parshuram Kund (present-day Arunachal Pradesh) in the east and included the present districts of Lakhimpur, Dhemaji, Tinsukia and some parts of Dibrugarh in Assam. Between 1228 and 1253 when Sukaphaa, the founder of the Ahom kingdom, was searching for a place to settle in Upper Assam, he and his followers did not encounter any resistance from the Chutia state, implying that the Chutia state must have been of little significance till at least the mid 14th century, when the Ahom chronicles mention them for the first time. However, it is also known that the Ahoms themselves were a people with a precariously small territory and population, which may indicate this absence of serious interaction with the old settled people of the neighborhood until the 14th century. At its largest extent, the Chutia influence might have extended up to Viswanath in the present Darrang district of Assam, though the main control was confined to the river valleys of Subansiri, Brahmaputra, Lohit and Dihing and hardly extended to the hills even at its zenith.

== Early contacts and downfall ==
=== With Ahoms (14th century) ===
The earliest mention of a Chutia king is found in the Buranjis that describe a friendly contact during the reign of Sutuphaa (1369–1379), in which the Ahom king was killed. The Satsari Buranji states that the Ahoms maintained cordial relations with the Chutia kingdom from the time of Sukapha’s sons until Sutuphaa’s death. To avenge the death the next Ahom ruler Tyaokhamti (1380–1387) led an expedition against the Chutiya kingdom but returned with no success.

=== Chutia-Ahom conflicts (1512–1523) ===
Suhungmung, the Ahom king, followed an expansionist policy and annexed Panbari of Habung in 1512, which, according to Amalendu Guha, was a Chutia dependency. In 1513 a border conflict triggered the Chutia king Dhirnarayan to advance to Dikhowmukh and build a stockade of banana trees (Posola-garh). This fort was attacked by a force led by the Ahom king himself leading to a rout of the Chutia soldiers. This was followed by the Ahoms erecting a fort at Mungkhrang, which fell within the Chutia territory.

In 1520 the Chutias attacked the Ahom fort Mungkhrang twice and in the second killed the commander and occupied it, but the Ahoms, led by Phrasengmung and King-lung attacked it by land and water and recovered it soon and erected an offensive fort on the banks of the Dibru River. In 1523 the Chutia king attacked the fort at Dibru but was routed. The Ahom king hotly pursued the retreating Chutia king who sued for peace. The peace overtures failed and the king finally fell to Ahom forces, bringing an end to the Chutia kingdom. Though some late spurious manuscripts mention the fallen king as Nitipal (or Chandranarayan) the extant records from the Buranjis such as the Ahom Buranji and the Deodhai Ahom Buranji do not mention him; rather they mention that the king and his son were killed.

== Legacy ==
The Ahom kingdom took complete possession of the royal insignia and other assets of the erstwhile kingdom. The rest of the royal family was dispersed, the nobles were disbanded and the territory was placed under the newly created office of the Sadiakhowa Gohain. Besides the material assets and territories, the Ahoms also took possession of the people according to their professions. Many of Brahmans, Kayasthas, Kalitas, and Daivajnas (the caste Hindus), as well as the artisans such as bell-metal workers, goldsmiths, blacksmiths, and others, were moved to the Ahom capital and this movement greatly increased the admixture of the Chutia and Ahom populations. A sizeable section of the population was also displaced from their former lands and dispersed in other parts of Upper Assam.

After annexing the Chutia kingdom, offices of the Ahom kingdom, Thao-mung Mung-teu(Bhatialia Gohain) with headquarters at Habung (Lakhimpur), Thao-mung Ban-lung(Banlungia Gohain) at Banlung (Dhemaji), Thao-mung Mung-klang(Dihingia gohain) at Dihing (Dibrugarh, Majuli and northern Sibsagar), Chaolung Shulung at Tiphao (northern Dibrugarh) were created to administer the newly acquired regions.. In 1527, a new ministerial position named Borpatrogohain was created (borrowed from the Chutia Vrihat-patra), and Klangseng(previously posted as Bhatialia Gohain) was given charge.

=== Firearms ===
The first specific mentions of extensive use of firearms in Ahom Buranjis are from the reign of Suhungmung; leading to some authors to suggest that the Ahoms acquired the art of using cannons from the Chutias, after the defeat of the Chutias by king Suhungmung. Others have suggested that whereas other powers in Assam and Northeast India acquired gunpowder technology from Burma or China, the Chutias may have acquired gunpowder technology from mainland India or Tibet as well, though the Tibetans are known to have used matchlocks only from the beginning of the seventeenth century, a century after the end of the Chutia kingdom. Some author speculate that the Ahom kingdom, who trace their roots to Tai people of Southeast Asia, may have received Chinese gunpowder technology from that region; and that it already had that technology before their confrontation with the Chutia royal house. Besides Ahoms, Kacharis are also known to have possessed firearms at that time. There are occasional mentions of the Ahom state receiving firearms from the Kacharis at later periods.

Nevertheless, it can be presumed that the Chutia's had the know-how and the materials required for its manufacture. When the Ahoms annexed Sadiya, they recovered hand-cannons called Hiloi as well as large cannons called Bor-top, Mithahulang being one of them. As per Maniram Dewan, the Ahom king Suhungmung received around three thousand blacksmiths after defeating the Chutias. These people were settled in the Bosa (Doyang) and Ujoni regions and asked to build iron implements like knives, daggers, swords as well as guns and cannons. Most of the Hiloi-Khanikars (gunmakers) in the Ahom khels belonged to the Chutia community. There also existed a class of gunmen in the Ahom army called Sutiya-Hiloidari.

== See also ==
- Chutia people
- History of Assam

== Bibliography ==
- Baruah, S L (1986), A Comprehensive History of Assam, Munshiram Manoharlal
- Laichen, Sun (2003). "Military Technology Transfers from Ming China and the Emergence of Northern Mainland Southeast Asia (c. 1390–1527)". Journal of Southeast Asian Studies. 34 (3). Cambridge University Press: 495–517. doi:10.1017/S0022463403000456. JSTOR 20072535. S2CID 162422482. Archived from the original on 6 August 2022.
- Buragohain, Ramesh (2013). State formation in Early Medieval Assam:A case study of the Chutiya state (PDF). Archived (PDF) from the original on 16 September 2020.
- Buragohain, Romesh (1988). Ahom State Formation in Assam: An Inquiry into the Factors of Polity Formation in Medieval North East India (PhD). North-Eastern Hill University. hdl:10603/61119.
- Baruah, Swarnalata (2007). Chutia Jatir Buranji (in Assamese).
- Datta, S (1985). Mataks and their Kingdom (PDF). Archived (PDF) from the original on 27 February 2021.
- Dutta, Sristidhar (1985), The Mataks and their Kingdom, Allahabad: Chugh Publications
- Gait, Sir Edward Albert (1963). A History of Assam. Thacker, Spink. Archived from the original on 6 July 2023.
- Gogoi, Jahnavi (2002). Agrarian System of Medieval Assam. New Delhi: Concept Publishing Company.
- Gogoi, Kakoli (2011). "Envisioning Goddess Tara: A Study of the Tara Traditions in Assam". Proceedings of the Indian History Congress. 72: 232–239. ISSN 2249-1937. JSTOR 44146715.
- Guha, Amalendu (December 1983), "The Ahom Political System: An Enquiry into the State Formation Process in Medieval Assam (1228–1714)", Social Scientist, 11 (12): 3–34, doi:10.2307/3516963, JSTOR 3516963, archived from the original on 6 July 2023
- Hazarika, Manjil; Sharma, Tridib (2016). "Ancient Gunpowder Technology of Assam". History Today. 17. Indian History and Culture Society: 87–92. ISBN 978-8100000779.
- Jaquesson, François (2017). "The linguistic reconstruction of the past: The case of the Boro-Garo languages". Linguistics of the Tibeto-Burman Area. 40 (1). Translated by van Breugel, Seino: 90–122. doi:10.1075/ltba.40.1.04van.
- Momin, Mignonette (2006). Society and Economy in North-East India, Volume 2 : Socio-Economic Linkages in the decline of Pragjyotisa-Kamrupa. Department of History, NEHU Press. ISBN 9788189233341. Archived from the original on 6 July 2023.
- Nath, D (2013), "State Formation in the Peripheral Areas: A Study of the Chutiya Kingdom in the Brahmaputra Valley", in Bhattarcharjee, J B; Syiemlieh, David R (eds.), Early States in North East India, Delhi: Regency Publications, pp. 24–49, ISBN 978-81-89233-86-0
- Neog, Maheswar (1977). "Light on a Ruling Dynasty of Arunachal Pradesh in the Fourteenth and Fifteenth Centuries". Annals of the Bhandarkar Oriental Research Institute. 58/59: 813–820. ISSN 0378-1143. JSTOR 41691751.
- Neog, Maheswar (1980). Early History of the Vaiṣṇava Faith and Movement in Assam: Śaṅkaradeva and His Times. Delhi: Motilal Banarsidass. ISBN 978-81-208-0007-6. Archived from the original on 6 July 2023.
- Phukan, J. N. (1992), "Chapter III The Tai-Ahom Power in Assam", in Barpujari, H. K. (ed.), The Comprehensive History of Assam, vol. II, Guwahati: Assam Publication Board, pp. 49–60
- Saikia, Yasmin (2004). Fragmented Memories: Struggling to be Tai-Ahom in India. Duke University Press. ISBN 082238616X. Archived from the original on 1 February 2023.
- Sarma, Benudhar (1993), Maniram Dewan, Guwahati: Manuh Prakashan
- Shin, Jae-Eun (2020). "Descending from demons, ascending to kshatriyas: Genealogical claims and political process in pre-modern Northeast India, The Chutiyas and the Dimasas". The Indian Economic and Social History Review. 57 (1): 49–75. doi:10.1177/0019464619894134. S2CID 213213265.
