= Singarigharutha =

Singarigharutha was the traditional coronation ceremony of the king of the Ahom kingdom, a medieval kingdom in Assam. During the period of Ahom supremacy in Assam, the Singarigharutha ceremony had important constitutional significance. It was believed that even though an Ahom prince became king, he could not attain the status of full-fledged monarch until his Singarigharutha ceremony was completely performed. Therefore, each Ahom ruler after their accession to the throne tried to organize the ceremony as soon as possible. But it was not as easy since the ceremony was very expensive and there were records when some of the Ahom kings had to postpone it owing to emergency situations or due to financial crisis of the state.

== Origin ==
The Singarigharutha ceremony was first observed by the Ahom King Sudangphaa, popularly known as Bamuni Konwar. Sudangphaa came to throne in 1397 CE. He transferred his capital from Charaideo to Charguwa. In the new capital, Sudangphaa organized the Kheun rwan mai kaw, a Tai-Ahom ceremony of coronation and claimed the mandate of Heaven to rule the Ahom Kingdom as a descendant of Lengdon or Indra, the Lord of Heaven and Earth. From that time onward, the Ahom kings performed the Singarigharutha ceremony as the main event of their coronations. The ritual was termed Singarigharutha because the wood of singari tree were used to construct the main platform on which the King sat during the procedure. Most of the Ahom rulers preferred to perform the Singarigharutha ceremony in Charaideo, which was considered very sacred by the Tai-Ahom community of Assam, since the reign of the Ahom King Sudangphaa.

== Procedures ==
To perform the ceremony, the king, at first, consulted the Tai-Ahom priests and astrologers: the Deodhai and Bailungs. An auspicious day was fixed.

On the day of ceremony, the king, wearing the Somdeo, or image of his tutelary deity, and carrying in his hand the Hengdan or ancestral sword, proceeded on a male elephant, followed by his chief queen in a female elephant, to Charaideo, where he planted a pipal tree (ficus religiosa). The royal couple next entered the Patghar, where the presiding priest poured a libation of water over them. Some Ahom chronicles stated that two people of common origin were selected and placed under the bamboo platform. When consecrated water was poured over the royal couple, it fell on the people below. The two who were under the bamboo platform were presented with gifts of gold and silver coins. Then they were exiled far from the capital, sometime even exiled from the kingdom, as it was believed that all the evil or ill omens of the new king and queen will leave with them. Such people were called Neusa-Jua which literally means the one who takes away the evils or ill omens. In olden days descendants of Neusa-Jua people were found in Goalpara district.

Afterward the royal couple took their seats in the Solongghar, on a bamboo platform, under which were placed a man and a specimen of every procurable animal. Consecrated water was poured over the royal couple and fell on the animals below. Then, having been bathed, they entered the Singarighar and took their seats on a throne. The leading nobles came up and offered their presents and homage. New money was coined, and gratuities were given to the principal officers of the state and to religious mendicants. The presents to the officers consisted of gold earrings, gold bangles and gold embroidered cloths. Deodhai-Bailungs were offered gold earrings, embroidered cloths, girdles, and long clocks, and silver, gold, cowries and cloths to the children and the people at large. On that day, prisoners convicted with minor crimes were released. The king and his chief queen stayed in the Singarighar for one full day and night.

In the evening, there was a feast which the king attended with his council of minister and noble. There was a custom that when the king sat on the royal throne engraved with dragons, with the image of Somdeo hanging down in his neck, the four principal ministers (Burhagohain, Borgohain, Borpatrogohain and Borbarua) held the four pillars or supports of the throne, signifying their importance and their support to the king. The image of Somdeo was considered very sacred to the Tai-Ahom royalty and it was very rarely exposed to common masses. During the Singarigharutha ceremony, Somdeo was shown to the Ahom nobles, to which they use to kneel down nine times. When the king came down from the nin-step dragon-engraved throne, the ministers and nobles use to salute the king seven times. After this the king was required to perform sacrifices to the gods.

Before the reign of Swargadeo Rudra Singha it had been the custom for the new king, before entering the Singarighar, to kill a man with his ancestral sword or Hengdan, but the monarch caused a buffalo to be substituted. The example was followed by his successors.

When a king was consecrated he attained the status of a full-fledged monarch. The festivities and amusements continued for seven days. On the eighth day, the image of Somdeo was returned to its shrine in the manner in which it was first brought and the king returned to the capital, with his family and nobles. During the next 30 days the tributary rulers and state officials who had not been present at the installation were expected to come in and do homage and tender their presents to the new king.

== Historical significance of the ceremony ==
The Kheun rwan mai kaw ceremony occupied an important place in the history of Ahom Kingdom. Records existed that the Ahom kings and nobles held special respect and importance to this ceremony. In some religious rites, the rank of the kings who had performed the Kheun rwan mai kaw ceremony and the kings who had not were different.

One event that occurred during the reign of Swargadeo Chandrakanta Singha in early 19th century, clearly showed the significance of the Kheun rwan mai kaw ceremony. During Ahom rule in Assam, the Shraddha or the death anniversary of the previous kings were observed annually according to Tai-Ahom traditional rituals. A tribute of rice beer and other items were offered on decorated plates to the former kings of Ahom kingdom. Chandrakanta Singha visited one of these rituals to offer his respect to the previous Ahom kings. He noticed that one plate was placed separately from others during the religious ceremony. When he enquired about this to the Prime Minister Purnananda Burhagohain, the premier replied that that plate was offered to Swargadeo Kamaleswar Singha and the reason of placing it in separate rank was because Kamaleswar Singha could not perform the Singarigharutha ceremony during his reign due to financial constraints: Kamaleswar Singha could not be placed in the same rank with the kings who had performed the ceremony. Purnananda Burhagohain also explained that owing to financial constraint the Singarigharutha ceremony of Chandrakanta Singha could not be performed at his accession. Chandrakanta Singha became anxious and began to put pressure on the premier to perform his Singarigharutha ceremony, which later became a cause of conflict between the king and the prime minister.

Ambassadors from neighbouring kingdoms of Cachar and Jaintia and representatives of neighbouring hill tribes visited this occasion to pay their respect to the Ahom monarch. Sometime the ambassadors were granted special privilege to witness the main events of the ceremony along with the festivals and amusements associated with it, as a sign of strengthening the friendly relations with neighbouring kingdoms and tribes.

== See also ==
- Ahom dynasty
- Ahom kingdom
- Assam
- Chandrakanta Singha
- Charaideo
- Kamaleswar Singha
- Sibsagar district
