= Borgohain =

Great Noble of the Ahom Dynasty

Borgohain (Ahom language: Chao Thao Lung) was one of the two original counselors in the Ahom kingdom. He was selected by the Ahom king from members of the Ahom nobility (Satgharia Ahom), who vowed not to fight for the position of Ahom kingship, rather act as a guide to the Ahom king in matters of administering his province in an efficient manner (King Maker). The other original counsellor is the Burhagohain. Both the positions existed from the time of the first Ahom king, Sukaphaa. After the first major expansion of the Ahom kingdom and the appointment of the first Borpatragohain, the Sadiya province was initially given to the Borgohain to administer. But later in the year 1527, he was replaced by King-lun Buragohain who was made Thao-mung Bo-ngen (Sadiyakhowa Gohain). After that, he was given the region south of the Dikhou river to Kaliabor on the south bank. In later times, he administered the region east of Burai on the north bank, as Borbarua was given the charge of territories between Sadiya province to Kaliabor.

== Bibliography ==
- Gait, Sir Edward Albert (1963). A History of Assam. Thacker, Spink.
- Bhuyan, Surya Kumar (1964). Satsari Buranji(2nd ed.) (in Assamese).
- Gogoi, Jahnabi (2002). Agragian system of Medieval Assam. ISBN 9788170229674.
- Barua, G.C. (1939). Ahom Buranji.
