= Ahom religion =

Ethnic religion of the Ahom people

Ahom Religion (Phuralung religion)
- 𑜒𑜑𑜪𑜨
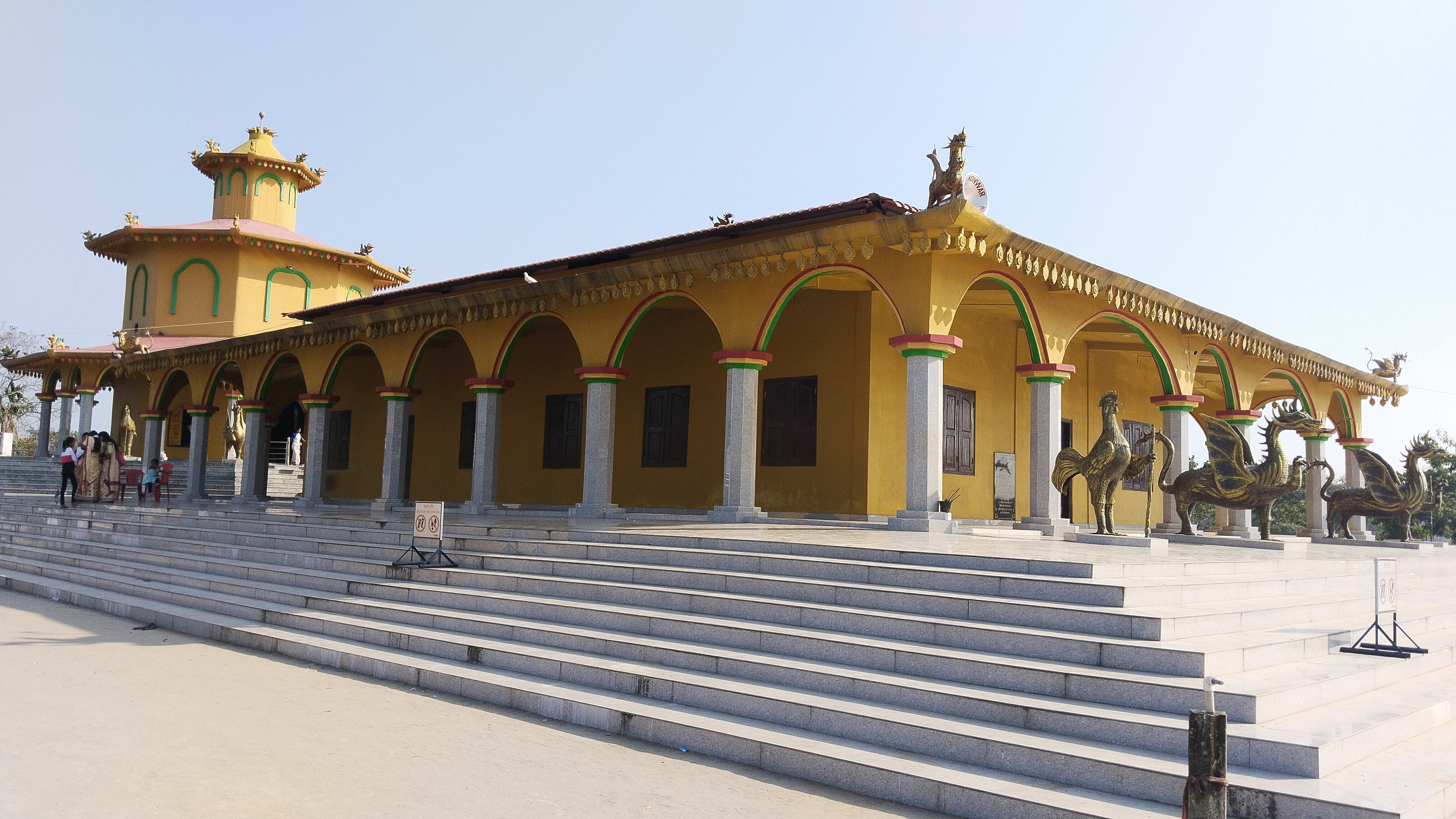
- Type: Taoic
- Scripture: Lit Lai Peyn Kaka
- Language: Ahom language

The Ahom religion, also known as Phuralung religion, is the ethnic religion of the Ahom people of Assam, India. The Ahom people came to Assam in 1228, led by the Tai prince Sukaphaa, and admixed with the local people. The people who came into Assam included two clans of priests, joined later by a third, who brought with them their own religion, rituals, practices and scriptures. The Ahom religion is based on ritual-oriented ancestor worship that requires animal sacrifice (Ban-Phi), though there is at least one Buddhism-influenced ritual in which sacrifice is forbidden (Phuralung). Ancestor worship and the animistic concept of khwan are two elements it shares with other Tai folk religions. There is no idolatry except for the titular god of the Ahom king and though there is a concept of heaven or a heavenly kingdom, there is no concept of hell. It was the state religion of the Ahom kingdom in the initial period.

The Ahom kingdom expanded suddenly in the 16th century and the Ahom peoples became a small minority in their own kingdom—though they continued to wield control. Subsequently, they slowly converted and by the early 19th-century, Ahom religion declined to be replaced by Hinduism. In the 1931 survey, all Ahoms listed Hinduism as their religion. Nevertheless, due to the Ahom revivalism movement as well as efforts from scholars, many of the older practices of the Ahom religion have been resurrected since the 1960s and 1970s.

The three priestly clans (Mo'sam, Mo'hung, Mo'Plong) of the Ahom people are the current custodians of the Ahom religion.

== Etymology ==
In the Tai-Ahom language, Am-Su-Shin refers to a religion or a doctrine. Phuralung is a combination of two Tai-Ahom words, Phura, meaning ‘the unified force of the world’, and Lung, meaning ‘Dragon’.

In 1975, the priestly class formed the Assam Phuralung Society, and designated the Ahom religion Am-Su-Shin Phuralung, or the Phuralung Religion.

== Ancestor worship ==
Ancestor worship is a core tenet of Ahom religion. Ancestor worship ceremonies are divided into two main types: Dam-Phi, performed in individuals households, and Me-Dam-Me-Phi, a public socio-religious ceremony. In the Ahom religion, after one dies, they are believed to become a Dam (lit. 'spirit of the dead'). Dam are held in awe, worshiped and propitiated for protection. After the fourteenth generation, a Dam becomes a Phi (god) and is worshiped by the whole community. There are three stages of Dam, based on the generation (with the highest living generation numbered one) and the circumstances of death, and they progress from one stage to the next.

=== Griha Dam ===
The head of the household and his wife, or the parents, are called the Na Dam ("new Dam", 2nd generation), the next highest generation the Ghai Dam ("main Dam", 3rd generation) and the next higher generation the Chi Rwan Dam (4th generation). Each Dam is complete only when both the husband and wife are dead. These three Dams constitute the Griha Dam (household Dam) and they are believed to reside in the North-east pillar of the kitchen, Pho Kam (Assamese: Dam Khuta), which is usually raised first during the construction of the house and is considered most sacred place in the entire house. The Dam Phi rituals are directed at the Pho Kam. The household deity, Seng Ka Pha, is also worshiped at the Pho Kam. Those who die unnaturally, without children or unmarried are called Jokorua Dam and are not included in the Griha Dam and treated and worshiped differently.

=== Chang Dam ===
The next nine generations of Dams (5th to 13th) constitute Chang Dam, the Dams who have been let out of the house into the threshold; and are worshiped according to special rites, called No Puruxor Saul Khua (feast for nine generations).

=== Chao Phi Dam ===
This is the final stage for Dams and in this stage, the Dams (14th and above) are considered to have become gods (Phi) and merged with original forefathers of the entire community collectively called Chao Phi Dam. In this class of Dams the two evil deities, Ra Khin and Ba Khin too belong, but they are worshiped with lower status and separately. The Jokorua Dams in the fourteenth generation become Khin and join these two deities.

== Gods and cosmogony ==
=== Creation of gods ===
It is mentioned in the Ahom scripture, Lit Lai Peyn Kaka, that at first there was nothing but the water of the ocean. Pha Tu Ching — the omnipotent and formless supreme deity — opened his eyes to the void and created from his breast the first deity — Khun Theu Kham. Freshly created, and finding nothing to lean on, Khun Theu Kham dove into the water and then laid on his back, and a lotus plant issued from his navel. This was followed by the creation of a crab, a tortoise, and an eight-hooded snake that encircled the tortoise. The eight hoods spread in eight directions. Then were created a white elephant with long tusks, and two mountains in the north and south, on which pillars were placed. Then a pair of gold-tinted spiders were created that floated in the air and dropped excrement, from which earth came about. The spiders then placed eight pillars in the eight corners of the wall, and spun their web to create heaven. Heaven in Ahom religion denotes Tien, a part of Yunnan in Southwest China known as Mong Phi.

Pha Tu Ching also created a consort for Khun Theu Kham, and they gave birth to the Lon Kām (four golden eggs). Pha Tu Chin then created a Thaolung to warm the eggs—but the eggs would not hatch for many years. So he sprinkled ambrosia (Nya Pulok) on them and four gods emerged:

(1) Pha-Sang-Din-kham-Neyeu
(2) Seng-Cha-Cha-Kham
(3) Seng-Kam-Pha
(4) Ngi-Ngao-Kham (also known as Phu-ra)

The fourth son, Ngi-Ngao-Kham, stayed back to help create the world. The third son, Seng-Kam-Pha, revolted and turned into an evil spirit, though his son Seng Ka Pha became a household deity.

=== Revered deities ===
According to Ahom beliefs, the supreme deity is Pha Tu Ching. He is omnipotent and formless, and is the creator, sustainer, and destroyer of everything. The other gods and the universe are his creation. The Ahom pantheon of gods that generally receive oblations are Lengdon, Khao Kham, Ai Leng Din, Jan Chai Hung, Jasing Pha, Chit Lam Cham, Mut-Kum Tai Kum, Ra-Khin, Ba-Khin and Chao Phi Dam.

The Pantheon of major Ahom Gods
	God	Domain
1	Khao Kham	The presiding deity of water
2	Ai Leng Din	The presiding deity of earth
3	Jan Chai Hung	The master god of all natural powers
4	Lengdon	The ruler of the whole universe
5	Chit Lam Cham	The presiding deity of seven powers
6	Mut-Kum Tai-Kum	The master gods of light: the sun and the moon
7	Jasing Pha	The original wise forefathers, masters of language, culture, education and knowledge.
8	Chao Phi Dam	The forefathers above the thirteenth generation.
9	Ra-Khin	The evil power that creates different diseases, pain, misery in the body.
10	Ba-Khin	The evil power who creates diseases, pain in mind.

Chumpha (Chumpha-Rung Seng-Mong) was the titular deity of the Ahom dynasty, represented by a relic and which symbolized the king’s sovereignty. It accompanied Sukaphaa across the Patkai on his journey into Assam. It used to be housed in the royal seat until Suklenmung (1539–1552) moved it away and played a prominent role during Singarigharutha ceremony. The relic is said to have been brought down from Mong Phi by Kun Lung and Kun Lai the ancestor of Sukaphaa rulers of Mong Ri-Mong Ram (Now Xishuangbanna, China) and could be worshipped and handled only by the king.

=== Other major deities ===
There are many other deities, including major ones, in the Ahom religion. The Tai-Ahom people generally had numbers of gods and spirits. They believed that, in this world of phenomena, visible objects have invisible spirits. These are some more of the major deities in the Ahom religion:

- Langkuri
- Chao Ban (the solar deity)
- Chao Den (the lunar deity)
- Chao Phai (the god of fire)
- Chao Pha Kun (the god of rain)
- Tai Lang (the god of death)
- Aai Yang Nao
- Kham Seng or Aai A Nang (the goddess of wealth)
- Lao Khri. (Mo-Seng Pha Lao-Khri)
- Pu-Phi-Su (the god of the forest, who lives in the ficus tree ()
- Khun Theu Kham
- Krai Pha Rung Kham
- Pha but rum Shang Dam
- Pha Ship ip shang Den

== Scriptures ==
The religious aspects are inscribed in scriptures written in the Ahom language on a kind of bark known as xasi. Ahom religion has various manuscripts on divination, prognostication, khwan calling, incantation, and Phralung. The three priestly clans (Mo'sam, Mo'hung, Mo'Plong) widely use these scripts. Some prayer scripts are known as Ban-Seng were found from Habung. Some of them were brought from Yunnan, China.

Scripture	Description
Lit Lai Pak Peyn Ka Ka	The Lit-Lai-Pat-Peyn-Ka-Ka is considered as the main scripture of Ahom religion. Most of the cosmology and Gods of Ahom religion derived from this vast scripture.
Khyek Phi Pha Nuru Lengdon; Lit Khamphi Lengdon Lanmung	These two texts enumerate the ritual worship of Lengdon
Ming Mang Phurālōng	This text enumerates the Phurālōng ritual worship.
Doya Phurā Puthi; Nemimang Phura Yao Ching Bong Phura; Urak Pha Phra	These three books list the Jataka tales of the Buddha.
Khyek Phi Umpha; Umpha Phi Kun An Lao	These books enumerate the ritual worship of Umpha
Dam-Phi-Chi-Phun-Kka-Rik Khwan; Khon Ming; Bar Phai	These books list the Rik-khwan ritual worship for longevity.
Lit Me-Dam Me-Phi	This book lists the ritual worship of ancestors.
Lai lit Nang Hoon Pha	This lists the ritual Ahom marriage ceremony called Cho-klong.
Jatak Phi An Ak	Included details of Rituals related to Birth Ceremony.
Lit Ye Seng Pha:	Included details of Rituals related to Ye-Seng-Pha (Ancestor Queen, Lord Of Knowledge and Arts).
Kai Tham; Kai theng Muong	manuscript gives the ritual of sacrificing of a chicken by incantation without causing death by suffocation and slitting and gives the method of divination by studying the chicken bones or chicken legs.
Pat nam Lai; Lit Aap tang	Books included the process of purifying water.
Pun Ko’ muong	A manuscript that describes the genesis.
Phi Luong - Phi Wan	A manuscript is of Ahom astrology.

== Rituals ==
The Ahom religion is based on rituals, and there are two types of rituals: Ban-Phi that involve animal sacrifice and Phuralung that forbids animal sacrifice. Rituals could also be performed at the household level or at the communal level.

=== Communal ceremonies ===
==== Me-Dam-Me-Phi ====
Me-Dam-Me-Phi (Ahom language : Me-worship; Dam-spirit of the dead; Phi-god) is one of the major ceremonies among the Ahom religious rituals that is performed publicly, propitiating the spirits of the dead. In the modern times, this is held annually on 31 January. The rituals begin with the creation of a temporary structure with bamboo and thatch octagonal in shape, called ho phi. In it six raised platters on the main platform are placed for the following divinities: Jashing Pha, Jan Chai Hung, Lengdon, Chit Lam Cham, Mut-Kum Tai-Kum, Chao Phi Dam. To the left of the main platform the raised platforms for Khao Kham and Ai Leng Din are placed; and to the right the raised platters of Ra Khin and Ba Khin.

==== Rik-Khwan Mong Khwan ====
The Rik-Khwan Mong Khwan (Ahom language : Rik-to call; Khwan-Life/longevity/Soul; Mōng-Nation), is a ritual to worship Khwan, to enhance or to call back the prosperity of the state or a person. The Rik Kwan is an important part of the Tai-Ahom marriage system described in the old Tai script Lai Lit Nang Hoon Pha. In early days Rik-Khwan Mung Khwan was performed by the Tai-Ahom kings on the victory of a war or the installation of the new kings. In the ceremony, devotee propitiates the god Khao Kham (the god of water) and invoke to restore the soul in the original normal place and to grant a long life.

==== Poi cheng ken ====
Poi cheng ken is a traditional spring festival celebrated in the Ahom month of Duin-Ha, which is part of the Sexagenary cycle. The festival is marked by activities like washing, especially bathing household cattle, honoring ancestors, and worshiping the insignia Chum Pha Rueng Sheng Mueang. The rituals of Cheng Ken are detailed in the ancient manuscript Khyek Lai Bet. As recorded:

Duin ha jao pai ka duin ruk Poi cheng ken ao ma, hu ap nam, khai ap nam...., lit. '‘the month of Duin-ha has passed. Poi cheng ken has come in Duin-ruk. Cows and buffaloes are washed with water.'

=== Non-communal rituals ===
==== Dam Phi ====
The Dam Phi rituals are specific to propitiating the Na Dam, Ghai Dam, Chi rwan Dam and the Jokorua Dam at the Pho Kam pillar inside the house. These rituals are offered on all auspicious occasion in the household—the three Bihus, the Na Khua ceremony (feast following new harvest), new birth in the household, nuai tuloni biya (female puberty ceremony), Chak lang (marriage), and annual death ceremonies.

== Similarities with other East Asian religions ==
Ahom religion is primarily based on worshiping Deities called Phi and Dam (Ancestor Spirit). Ancestor worship and the animistic concept of khwan are two elements it shares with other Tai folk religions. While the duality of the individual self Han (Phu) and Pu are concepts that probably came from Taoism Concepts Yin and Yang. The custom sacred offerings consisting of chicken and Lao traditional rice beer, both in diluted (Nam Lao) and undiluted (Luok Lao) forms can be seen in other Tai folk religion too.

== See also ==
- Bathouism
- Sanamahism
