= Saopha =

Royal title

Saopha Sawbwa, Chaopha, Chao Fa
- Status: Defunct
- Extinction date: 20th century
- A nobility title used by Tai rulers

Saopha (lit. 'lord of the heavens/celestial lord'), also spelled Sawbwa, was the title used by hereditary rulers of Shan states in Upper Myanmar. Chaopha and Chao Fa were similar titles used by the hereditary Tai rulers in mainland Southeast Asia and the Ahom kingdom in India.

== Names and etymology ==
Saopha (Shan: ၸဝ်ႈၽႃႉ, romanized: tsaw3 pʰaa5) means "lord of the heavens" in the Shan language. It was rendered into Burmese as sawbwa (စော်ဘွား).

Variants in other Tai languages include tsāo phâa (𑜋𑜰𑜫;𑜇𑜡.) in Ahom, chau-fa (ᥓᥝᥲ ᥜᥣᥳ) in Tai Nuea, and chao fa (เจ้าฟ้า) in Thai and Lao (ເຈົ້າຟ້າ).

== Usage ==
=== Myanmar (Burma) ===
In the pre-colonial era, the term 'sawbwa' was utilised by the Burmese monarchy in reference to the hereditary rulers of Shan-speaking polities called möng (Shan: မိူင်း, pronounced [mə́ŋ]), in the region. In order of precedence, the sawbwas outranked local rulers of lower ranks, namely the myoza and ngwegunhmu.

During British colonial rule, colonial authorities adopted the Burmese system, recognising between 14 and 16 sawbwas who enjoyed a degree of autonomy in their fiefdoms. In 1922, the establishment of the Federated Shan States greatly reduced the sawbwas' autonomy. In April 1959, the sawbwas relinquished their feudal authority to the Burmese government.

The distinction in the titles dates from the days of the Burmese monarchy although the same states have not continued to hold the same titles for their chiefs during the centuries—changes took place according to royal favour, results of battles and later, the decisions of the British authorities. The privileges and titles were so much a matter of royal ordinance that every one of a Sawbwa's symbols of power was laid down in a special book of dispensations granted by the higher court. His regalia and clothes, the guilding and jewel decoration of betel boxes, spittoons, fly-whisks and such articles of use, the dress of ministers, the umbrellas, spears and horses in procession, the caparisoning of the royal elephant, the instruments for processional music, the gateways and the style of residence, all were rigidly prescribed to ensure that the dignity kept up accordance with the status of a royal chieftain, yet did not encroach on the special privileges reserved for the court of Ava itself. The British, whose success in administration was largely bound up with observance, of precedence in a hierarchy, listed states also as Sawbaships, Myosaships and Ngwegunhmuships

=== Ahom kingdom ===
The Ahom kingdom (Möng Dön: 𑜉𑜢𑜤𑜂𑜫: 𑜓𑜢𑜤𑜃𑜫) used Chaopha as a title for their kings. The Swargodeu (Assamese: স্বৰ্গদেউ) was the Assamese equivalent translation of Chaopha which also means Lord of the Heaven in Assamese. The first ruler and establisher Sukaphaa used Chao-pha and Chao-lung (lit. 'Great Lord') as honourable prefixes.

=== China ===
The term was also used for the rulers of some Tai polities in what is now China's Yunnan Province. In the Ming dynasty, Chinese Dai Tusi chief attached Pha (法) after the name, but they don't use the term when they contact with official. The imperial court also doesn't use the term when refer their name.

== Gallery ==
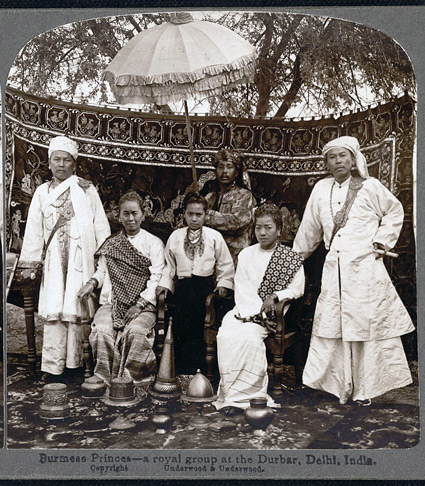

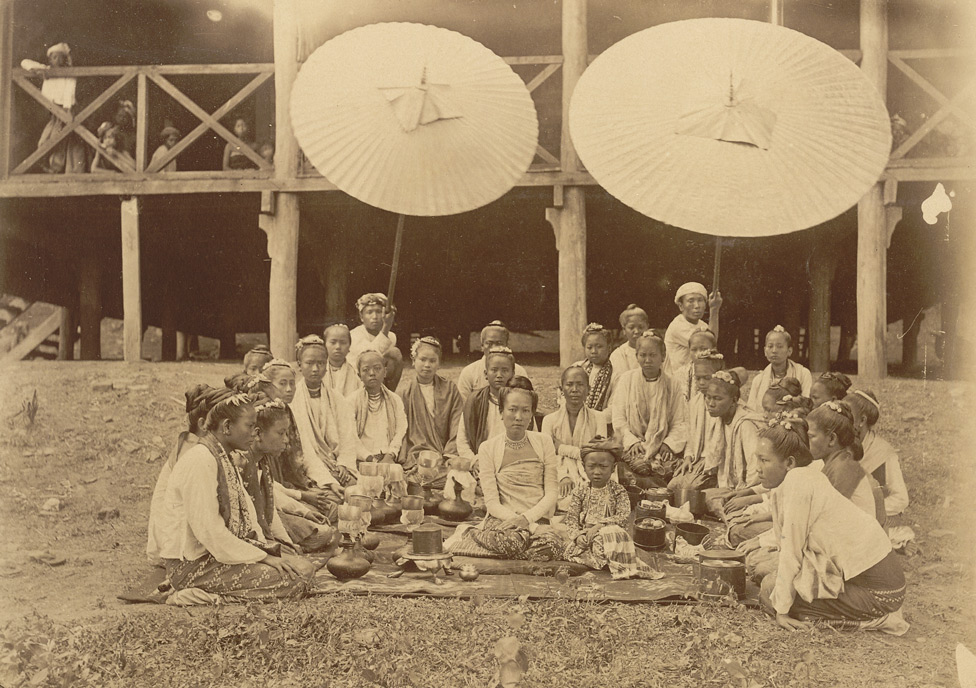

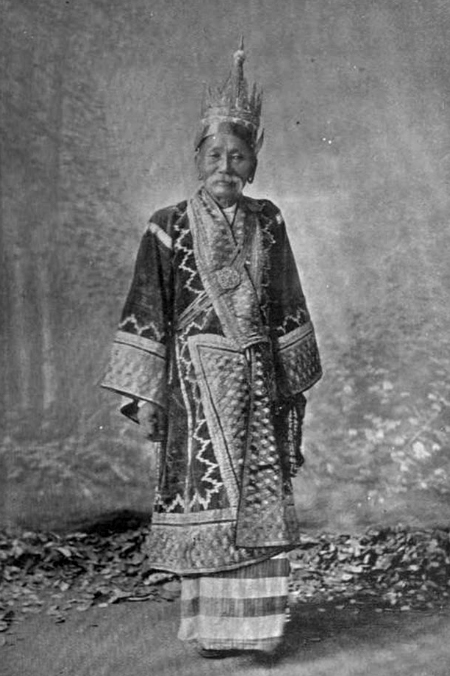

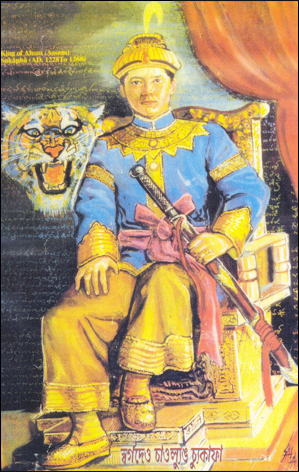

== See also ==
- Ahom dynasty
- Chao (monarchy)
- Tusi
