= Ahom =

Ahom may refer to:

- Ahom people, an ethnic community in Assam
- Ahom language, a language associated with the Ahom people
- Ahom religion, an ethnic folk religion of Tai-Ahom people
- Ahom alphabet, a script used to write the Ahom language
- Ahom kingdom, a medieval kingdom in the Brahmaputra valley in Assam
- Ahom Dynasty, the dynasty that reigned over the Ahom kingdom, in present day Assam.
- Ahom (Unicode block)
