= Surjya Kanta Hazarika =

Indian educationalist and Padma Shri awardee

- Born: 31 May 1956 (age 70); Dibrugarh, Assam
- Occupations: Journalist; writer; lyricist; poet; film maker
- Spouse: Eva Hazarika
- Awards: Padma Shri (2008)
- Website: drsurjyahazarika.com

Surjya Kanta Hazarika is an Assamese litterateur, an eminent scholar, author, journalist, poet, publisher, playwright, lyricist, composer, cultural activist, feature film and documentary maker, social worker and philanthropist. Hazarika is a recipient of the Padma Shri Award in 2008 for his contribution to Literature & Education. He was also the president of Asam Sahitya Sabha from 2022 to 2024 .

== Birth ==
Dr. Surjya Kanta Hazarika was born on 31 May 1956 in Dibrugarh in a cultured family. His father was Chandrakanta Hazarika, and his mother was Labanya Hazarika. His father, Chandrakanta Hazarika, was a teacher by profession, but he had also established a publication house named “Bani Mandir” in 1949. This became an elite publication house of Assam within a short span of time. among the seven children; three sons and four daughters., Surjya Kanta Hazarika was the eldest child.

== Education ==
After finishing his school education in Dibrugarh and Digboi, he enrolled for pre-university classes at Gauhati Commerce College, Guwahati in 1973–74. After one year of studying, he was forced to go back to Dibrugarh in order to look after the family publication business. Here, he completed his PU from DHSK Commerce College in Dibrugarh. In 1978 he completed his B.Com. from the same college. He received a M.Com. degree from Dibrugarh University in 1980. After this he started pursuing a Ph.D. in Gauhati University but could not finish it, as he was too preoccupied with newspaper publication activities. However, in 2016 he started pursuing a Ph.D. again from Mahapurush Srimanta Sankaradeva University, Nagaon. Initially, he started his research under the guidance of Dr. Pradip Hazarika; but after his untimely death Hazarika resumed his research work under Dr. Karabi Deka Hazarika, finishing it in 2021. His research topic was 'Publication of Assam related books in the 19th century: A survey.' This thesis has been published as a book and is a valuable treasure of information for those who study the history of Assamese language and literature.

== As an author ==
From an early age Surjya Kanta Hazarika started to write. When he was in ninth standard, he wrote about a Delhi trip in a popular weekly newspaper Asom Bani. His first book ‘Siku Aaha Nana Katha’ (Let's Learn Many Things) was published in 1975 when he was just twenty. From an early age he edited several magazines including the college magazines. He had edited a handwritten magazine ‘Jyotirupa’ in 1976.

Right from the time when he was in his early twenties Surjya Kanta Hazarika has been actively taking forward his family legacy of book publication and printing. Contributing immensely to Assamese book publishing industry and literature in general, he had established Chandrakanta Press Pvt. Ltd. in Guwahati in 1987. He had shifted his base to Guwahati two years earlier in 1985. One of his biggest ambitions was his dream of publishing a daily news paper. On January 1, 1988, he started publishing an Assamese News Paper named ‘Natun Dainik’. ‘Natun Dainik’ had soon become a very popular news paper under the editorship of Chandra Prasad Saikia, Jatindra Kumar Borgohain and Dr. Rohini Kumar Barua(a retired IAS) and later Surjya Kanta Hazarika himself took the editorship of the newspaper in 1993–94 and 1997–99.

== As a publisher ==
As a publisher of news papers, Surjya Kanta Hazarika had introduced a few revolutionary concepts in Assamese news paper industry. He had introduced ‘Sandhya Batori’, an evening newspaper in 1989. ‘Chitra Sangbad’ a niche news paper dedicated to cinema and cultural activities in 1990 and a sports news paper ‘Khel Sangbad’ in 1992. Khel Sangbad was published under his own editorship. Apart from these four newspapers, he brought out a fortnightly newspaper named ‘Bahniman’ from Dibrugarh. He had also published another magazine named ‘Pratidhwani’ with Dr. Bhupen Hazarika as the editor and himself as the Associate Editor.

Surjya Kanta Hazarika was only twenty when his association with ‘Asam Sahitya Sabha’ started. Since then he has been an active member of the ‘Asam Sahitya Sabha’. In 1980 he had taken the responsibility of Assistant Secretary of Dibrugarh Sahitya Sabha. He had also edited the news paper ‘Asam Sahitya Sabha Sangbad’ published by the Asam Sahitya Sabha in 1993. He was the editor of ‘Asam Sahitya Sabha Patrika(Viswakosh Edition)’ in 2003. In 1993–94, 2001–03, 2010–12, 2012–14 he was a member of the executive committee of the Asam Sahitya Sabha.

Dr. Surjya Kanta Hazarika has published thousands of books under the banner of ‘Bani Mandir’ and ‘S. H. Educational Trust’. He has also encouraged many new authors. He has written and edited many books. In order to preserve the legacy of Assamese literature he has also reprinted many age-old books.

Dr. Surjya Kanta Hazarika has been associated with many prestigious organisations in various capacities including the All Assam Book Sellers & Publishers’ Association, as the President for the period of 2005-06 & 2006–07. He is also the adviser of All Assam Printers’ Association. During this time he took many steps to promote Assamese publishing industry at the national and international level.

One of the most valuable works of Dr. Surjya Kanta Hazarika is the transcription of Multi-faceted Dr. Bhupen Hazarika's autobiography ‘Moi Eti Jajabor’.

== As a lyricist/composer ==
As a lyricist/composer, Dr. Surjya Kanta Hazarika has contributed significantly to the world of Assamese music. In 1987 he became an approved lyricist of All India Radio, Dibrugarh. Later All India Radio, Guwahati had also recognized him as an approved lyricist. He has written and composed songs for various audio albums, TV serials, movies and documentaries. ‘Brikodar Baruar Biya’, ‘Tore More Alokore Jatra’, ‘Ananya Prantar’, ‘Bahuttor Majot Ekotto’, ‘Ghar Sangsar’, ‘Merpak’, ‘Roopkonwar Jyotiprasad Agarwala’, ‘Rupantarar Silpi Jyotiprasad’, ‘Jyotiprasad: A Legend of the Northeast (English)’ etc. are some of the TV serials for which he wrote songs. He has produced several audio albums. Most significant among these are – ‘Shrabya Safura’, ‘Asta Mukuta (Dr. Surjya Kanta Hazarika’s lyrics and Dr. Bhupen Hazarika’s composition & vocals), ‘Borluit’, ‘Jyoti Prasad’, ‘Harinam Loboloi (devotional)’, ‘Dholor Sewe Sewe (Bihu)’, ‘Adhyatmik Dr. Bhupen Hazarika’ and ‘O Mur Aponar Desh’.

== As a producer/director ==
Dr. Surjya Kanta Hazarika has produced & directed many TV serials, documentaries and has acted in several serials, movies, plays etc. Assamese TV serial ‘Brikodar Baruar Biya’, produced and directed by Dr. Hazarika was one of the most super hit and iconic Assamese TV serials of all times. It was telecast by Doordarshan Kendra, Guwahati. Apart from this, he directed and produced 9 other TV Serials namely Nirmal Bhakat, Ananya Prantar, Noi Boi Jai, Tore More Alokore Jatra, Maharathi, Dhanya Nara Tanu Bhal, The North East Today, The North East Round-up etc., 18 documentaries namely Chira Senehi Mor Bhasa Janani, Namghare Namghare, Shrimanta Sankardev aru Brindaboni Vastra, Sahityarathi Lakshminath Bezbarua, Rupantoror Shilpi Jyotiprashad, Bihangam Drishtit Bishnu Prashad Rabha, Bihangam Drishtit Dr. Bhupen Hazarika, Dr. Bhupen Hazarika : a living legend, Asom Ratna Dr. Bhupen Hazarika, Bahuttar Majot Ekotto, Jawahar Rojgar Yojana, Grammunayan: Mahila aru Shishu, Jyotiprashad: a legend for the North East, Kalaguru Bishnu Prashad Rabha, Mother and Child Healthcare, Places of Tourist Attraction in Assam, In search of a Lost City of Pragjyotishpur, 1 telefilm named Mitrashya Chakushya in Hindi and has assisted in the direction of a TV serial named ‘Bor Luitor Pare Pare’. Apart from that he has also acted in several TV serials, radio and stage plays as well as movies.

He produced and directed a full-length feature film name ‘Shrimanta Sankaradeva’ depicting the life and works of Shrimanta Sankaradeva, a 15th-century Assamese Vaishnavite saint, social reformer and cultural icon.

Dr. Surjya Kanta Hazarika has also been recognized with many prestigious awards including the ‘Padmashri’ in 2008.

== Notable works ==
=== Books ===
‘Dr. William Carey, Atmaram Sarma Aru Asamiya Bhashar Pratham Chapa Grantha Dharmapustak’ (Dr. William Carey, Atmaram Sarma and the first Assamese Printed Book ‘Dharmapustak’) 2017:

‘Dharmapustak’ was the first Assamese printed book published by American Missionaries in 1813. It was the Assamese translation of the Bible done by Atmaram Sarma at the initiative of British Missionary Dr. William Carey. Dr. Surjya Kanta Hazarika has documented important aspects related to the publishing of the book which was significant in the development of modern Assamese publishing industry as well as Assamese literature.

Asamor Jatiyo Sangeet Aru Itihaas (The State Anthem of Assam and Its History), 2016:

This research oriented book highlights the historical significance of ‘O Mur Aponar Desh’, the state anthem of Assam.

Anya Ek Dristikonere Sahityarathi Lakshminath Bezbaroa (Sahityarathi Lakshminath Bezbarua from A Different Perspective) 2019:

Sahityarathi Lakshminath Bezbaruar Sangbadikota (Sahityrathi Lakshminath Bezbarua’s Journalism) 2021:

Sahityarathi Lakshminath Bezbarua was one of the stalwarts of Assamese literature and language. He was one of the pioneers of the struggle for the identity of Assamese language. Apart from his role in literature and culture, he was also one of the pioneers in Assamese journalism. Bezbarua gave birth to a new era in Assamese literature and journalism as the editor of newspapers ‘Jonaki’ and ‘Bahi’. These magazines, in fact, were the platforms that nourished and catapulted many Assamese authors and journalists who became famous later. Dr. Surjya Hazarika explores these aspects of Bezbarua in this book.

Unabingsha Satikat Prakashita Asomar Grantha Itihas (The history of Books on Assam Printed and Published during 19th Century from different Places of Assam, India and Abroad):

Apart from books on literature, culture, history & heritage etc. Dr. Hazarika has also covered the books on geography, mathematics, dictionaries, and even school textbooks published in the period between 1801 and 1900. The book encompasses the detailed description of the process of making blocks for Assamese printing press, and historical facts related to the setting up of the printing press in Assam. This book is an historical document related to evolution of Assamese printing, and publishing industry.

Bhupendar Xoite Xannidhyar Kisu Mitha Sowaran (Sweet Reminiscence of Dr. Bhupen Hazarika’s Association) 2022:

This coffee table book, which includes many rare photographs, highlights the moments of interactions between Dr. Bhupen Hazarika and Dr. Surjya Kanta Hazarika during their 40 years long association.

==== Other books ====
Spiritual/Religious books edited by Dr. Surjya Kanta Hazarika

- Kirtan Ghosha Aru Naam Ghosha (Kirtan Ghosha & Naam Ghosha) 2003
- Chari Shastra (Four scriptures- Kirtan Ghosha, Naam Ghosha, Bhakti Ratnavali and Dasam together) 2006
- Sri Madbhagawat (complete Bhagawat with introduction), 2014
- Srimanta Sankaradeva Bakyamrit (Complete works of Srimanta Sankaradeva), 2014
- Sri Sri Madbhabdev Bakyamrit (Complete works of Sri Sri Madhabdeva), 2015
- Sachitra Kirtan Ghosha (Illustrated Manuscript of Kirtan Ghosa), 2016
- Sachitra Bhakti Ratnavali (Illustrated Manuscript of Bhakti Ratnavali), 2016
- Sachitra Srimad-Bhagawat (8th chapter) (Illustrated Manuscript of Srimad-Bhagawata), 2016
- Sachitra Srimad-Bhagawat (11th Chapter) (Illustrated Manuscript of Srimad-Bhagawata), 2016
- Sachitra Banamalideva Charit (Illustrated Manuscript of Banamalideva Charit), 2016
- Chitra Bhagawat, (Illustrated Manuscript of Bhagawat),2017
- Sachitra Kirtan Ghosha (Illustrated Manuscript of Kirtan Ghosa), Kathbapu Satra Edition,2022
- Sachitra Kirtan Ghosha (Illustrated Manuscript of Kirtan Ghosa), Na-Burka Satra Edition,2022
- Sachitra Kirtan Ghosha (Illustrated Manuscript of Kirtan Ghosa), British Museum Edition, 2022
- Sachitra Aadi Dasam (Illustrated Manuscript of Srimad-Bhagavat's 10th Canto),2022
- Parijat Haran Naat, 2017
- Ram Vijay Naat, 2018
- Keligopal Naat, 2019
- Saptakanda Ramayan, 2022

==== Compiled & Edited Books on various topics ====
- Bhupen Hazarikar Geet Samagra (Songs of Dr. Bhupen Hazarika), 1993
- Adhunik Asamiya Biswakosh, 1994
- Rasaraj Lakhsminath Bezbaruar Sishu Sahitya Sambhar, 2006
- Books From Assam (An introductory catalogue of 68 Assamese Books), 2006
- Sahityacharya Atul Chandra Hazarika Sishu Sahitya Sambhar (1st, 2nd and 3rd volume) 2007
- Bhupen Hazarika Rchanawali (1st, 2nd and 3rd volume), 2008
- Bhinnojonor Drsitit Bishnuprasad Rabha (Compilation of more than 200 articles), 2008
- Moi Eti Jajabor (Dr. Bhupen Hazarika's Transcribed Autobiography) 2008
- Dharmapustak (Reprint of the first Assamese book printed in 1813), 2012
- A Catalogue of Manuscripts Preserved at The Srimanta Shankardev Kalakshetra, 2018
- The Wandering Minstrel Dr. Bhupen Hazarika: A Jewel in the Crown of the Nation

==== Magazines Edited ====
- Asam Sahitya Sabha Sangbad, 1993
- Asam Sahitya Sabha Patrika, 2003
- Jyotirupa (Handwritten magazine edited during his student life), 1976–77
- Pratidhwani, (Associated Editor for the magazine edited by Dr. Bhupen Hazarika), 1985-90

==== Souvenirs Edited ====
- Souvenir of Assamese Film Festival held in Dibrugarh, 1980
- Souvenir of the presentation ceremony of the Assam Ratna award given to Dr. Bhupen Hazaika by Government of Assam
- Souvenir of Srimanta Sankaradeva International Festival, 2016
- Souvenir to mark the 20th anniversary of the Srimanta Sankaradeva Kalakshetra, 2019
- Souvenir of Guwahati Literary Festival, 2012

==== Newspapers & magazines edited ====
- Natun Dainik, editor (1993–94, 1997–98), total 3 years
- Sandhya Batori, Editor (1989–96), 8 years
- Chitra Sangbad, Editor, (1990-2000), 11 years
- Khel Sangbad, Editor, (fortnightly sports news paper in Assamese), 1 year
- Bahniman, editor (fortnightly newspaper) 1978–79, 2 years

==== Dictionaries ====
- Byabaharik Asamiya Abhidhan- Dr. Basanta Kumar Goswami
- Biparitarthak Sabdar Abhidhan- Dr. Basanta Kumar Goswami

=== Feature film ===
Srimanta Sankardeva (2010)

=== Documentraies ===
==== Research based- ====
- Siro Senehi Mur Bhasha Janani
- Srimanta Shankardev Aru Brindabani Bastra
- Asam Rtana Dr. Bhupen Hazarika

==== Biographical- ====
- Sahityarathi Lakshminath Bezbarua
- Rupantarar Silpi Jyotiprasad
- Bihangam Dristit Bishnuprasad Rabha
- Bihangam Dristit Dr. Bhupen Hazarika
- Dr. Bhupen Hazarika: A Living Legend
- Syed Abdul Malik: Ek Byaktigata Sannidhyar Madhur Sowaran
- Jyotiprasad: A Legend of The North-East
- Kalaguru Bishnu Prasad Rabha

=== Director of TV serials ===
==== TV serials ====
- Brikodar Baruar Biya
- Nirmal Bhakat
- Ananya Prantar
- Noi Boi Jai
- Tore More Alokore Jatra
- Moharothi
- Dhanya Nara Tanu Bhal

Year	TV serials	Remarks
1993	Nirmal Bhakat	5 Episodes in Hindi on Assam History Story by Legendary Novelist Rajanikanta Bordoloi
2004	Dhanya Nara Tanu Bhal	8 Episodes in Hindi based on the Legendary Srimanta Sankardeva's Life & Activities
2004	Tore More Aalokore Jatra	8 Episodes in Assamese based on Life & Activities of Cultural Icon Jyoti Prasad Agarwalla
2004	Ananya Prantar	8 Episodes in Assamese based on Assam History
2005	Maharathi	8 Episodes in Hindi based on Karna character of Epic Mahabharata) story by Chandra Prasad Saikia
2011	Noi Boi Jai	A serial based on cultural frictions of Assam, story by Dr.Lila Gogoi
