= Ahom script =

Abugida used to write the Ahom language

Ahom script 𑜒𑜑𑜪𑜨
- 'Ahom' in Ahom script
- Script type: Abugida
- Period: late 14th to 16th century–19th century
- Direction: Left-to-right
- Languages: Ahom language, Assamese language (rarely)

Related scripts
- Parent systems: Proto-Sinaitic alphabet: Phoenician alphabet; Aramaic alphabet; Brāhmī; Tamil-Brahmi; Pallava script; Mon–Burmese script; Lik-Tai scripts; Ahom script
- Sister systems: Tai Le, Khamti

ISO 15924
- ISO 15924: Ahom (338), Ahom, Tai Ahom

Unicode
- Unicode alias: Ahom
- Unicode range: U+11700–U+1173F

The Ahom script or Tai Ahom Script is an abugida that is used to write the Ahom language, a dormant Tai language undergoing revival spoken by the Ahom people till the late 18th-century, who established the Ahom kingdom and ruled the eastern part of the Brahmaputra valley between the 13th and the 18th centuries. The earliest surviving Ahom inscription, the Snake Pillar inscription, dates only to the early 16th century, and scholars generally agree that the script was adapted from a proto-Shan script derived from Burmese between the late 14th and 16th centuries. The old Ahom language today survives in the numerous manuscripts written in this script currently in institutional and private possession. Dibrugarh University has a 2-year Post Graduate Diploma course in Tai language. The Centre for South East Asian Studies, Gauhati University, on 27 April 2026 launched a 6-month Certificate Course in Tai-Ahom language and Medieval Manuscriptology.

== History ==
=== Origins of the Language ===
A section of Mao-Shan people led by Prince Siu-Ka-Pha left the state of Muong-Mao-Lung in 1215 CE accompanied by three queens, two sons and a daughter. He was accompanied by Chiefs of five other dependent Muongs (States), their attendants and families, members of the priestly class and 9,000 soldiers. The language of these people was Tai, known today as Tai-Ahom to distinguish it from the sister language of other Tai groups residing in Assam and North East India, such as Tai-Khamti, Tai-Phake (or Phakial in Assamese), Tai-Aiton (or Aitonia in Assamese), Tai-Turung, Tai-Khamjang (or Khamjangia in Assamese). The Tai-Ahom language belongs to the South-West group of the Tai branch of the Tai-Kadai language family.

In 1904, Sir George Abraham Grierson made a systematic study of the Tai-Ahom language, published in The Linguistic Survey of India, Vol. II. Others, including Rev. Nathan Brown, B. H. Hodgson, Sir George Campbell, E. T. Dalton, G. H. Damant and P. R. T. Gurdon, wrote about the alphabet, script, and vocabulary of the Tai-Ahom language.

=== Origins of the Script ===
It is believed that the Ahom people adopted their script from either Old Mon or Old Burmese, in Upper Myanmar. This is supported based on similar shapes of characters between Ahom and Old Mon and Old Burmese scripts. It is clear, however, that the script and language would have changed during the few hundred years it was in use. More recent research suggests that the development and adoption of the Tai Ahom script in Assam occurred later than traditionally assumed. While Ahom traditions associate the script with the migration of Sukaphaa in the 13th century, linguistic and epigraphic evidence indicate that the script likely emerged within the wider Tai-Shan cultural sphere in the late 14th or early 16th century and was subsequently introduced or adapted in Assam. The earliest surviving Ahom inscription, the Snake Pillar inscription, dates only to the early 16th century, suggesting that the widespread use and standardisation of the script in the Ahom kingdom took place during the late medieval period.

The Lik Tai script featured on a 1407 Ming dynasty scroll exhibits many features of the Burmese script, including fourteen of the nineteen consonants, three medial diacritics and the high tone marker. According to the scholar Daniels, this shows that the Tai borrowed from the Burmese script to create their own script; the Lik Tai script was derived from the Burmese script, as it could only have been created by someone proficient in Burmese. Daniels also argues that, unlike previously thought, the Lik Tho Ngok script is not the origin of the other Lik Tai scripts, as the 1407 Lik Tai script shows greater similarity to the Ahom script, which has been attested earlier than the Lik Tho Ngok script. Other "Lik" scripts are used for the Khamti, Phake, Aiton and Tai Nuea languages, as well as for other Tai languages across Northern Myanmar and Assam, in Northeast India. The Lik scripts have a limited inventory of 16 to 18 consonant symbols compared to the Tai Tham script, which possibly indicates that the scripts were not developed for writing Pali.

The various Burmese scripts that the Ahom script itself is derived from, was likely derived from the Indic, or Brahmi script, and possibly of South Indic origin. The Brahmic Script gradually spread to Southeast Asia (from the more western and/or northern regions of South Asia), through ports on trading routes. At these trading posts, ancient inscriptions have been found in Sanskrit, using scripts like the Brahmic Script, among others. At first, inscriptions were made in Sanskrit, Pali or various other Prakirts, but later the scripts were used to write the local Southeast Asian languages along with local varieties of the scripts being developed. By the 8th century, the scripts had diverged and separated into regional scripts.

In 1920 Rai Saheb Golap Chandra Barua published the "Ahom-Assamese-English Dictionary". In 1936 Ghana Kanta Barua published the Ahom Primer (with grammar). In 1964, Bimala Kanta Barua and Nandanath Deodhai Phukan compiled the Ahom Lexicons(based on original Tai Manuscripts) and published by Department of Historical and Antiquarian Studies, Government of Assam. Samples of writing in the Ahom Script (Buranji's) remain stored in Assamese collections. The manuscripts were reportedly traditionally produced on paper prepared from agarwood (locally known as sachi) bark. Assamese replaced Ahom during the 17th century.

The Ahom script is no longer used by the Ahom people to read and write in everyday life. However, it retains cultural significance and is used for religious ceremonies, chants and to read literature. Ahom's literary tradition provides a window into the past, of Ahom's culture. A printed form of the font was developed in 1920, to be used in the first "Ahom-Assamese-English Dictionary".

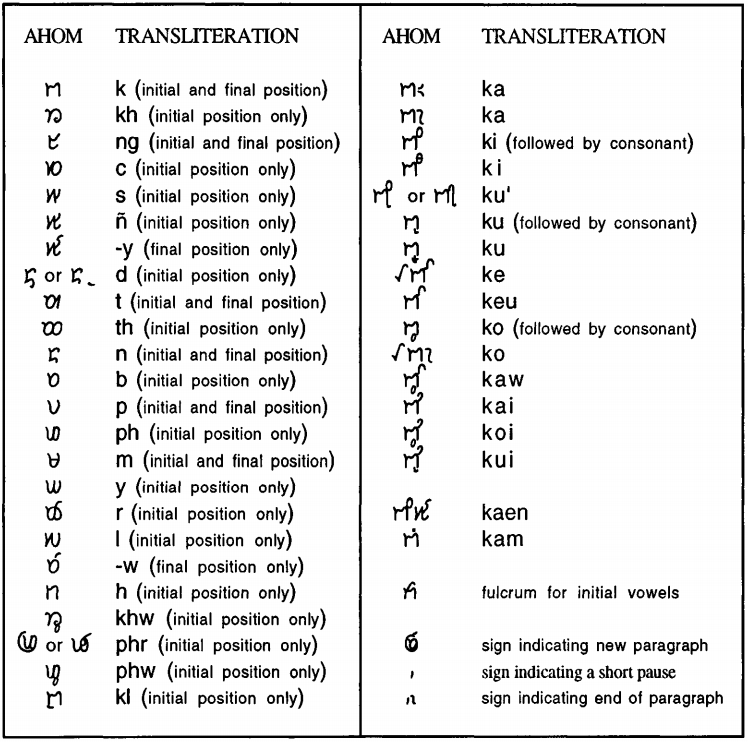
The Ahom script

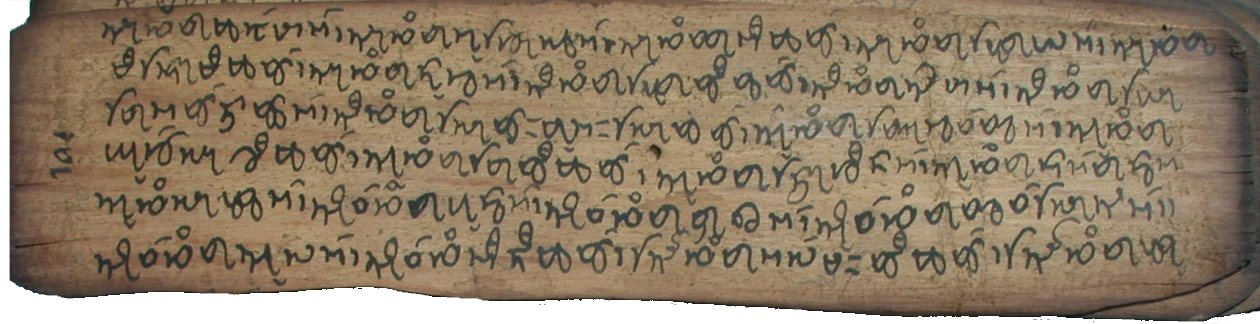
An Ahom manuscript preserved in the Department of Historical and Antiquarian Studies, Pan Bazaar, Guwahati.

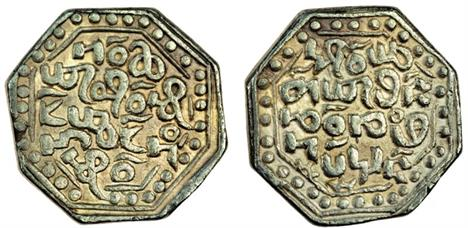
Coin of Ahom king Sunyatphaa in Ahom script

== Letters ==
Like most abugidas, each letter has an inherent vowel of /a/. Other vowels are indicated by using diacritics, which can appear above, below, to the left, or to the right of the consonant. The script does not, however, indicate tones used in the language. The Ahom script is further complicated as it contains inconsistencies; a consonant may be written once in a word, but pronounced twice, common words may be shortened, and consecutive words with the same initial consonant may be contracted.

=== Consonants ===
Ahom consonants
𑜀 ka IPA: /ka/	𑜁 kha IPA: /kʰa/	𑜕𑜖 ga IPA: /ɡa/ (Note: Font variants.)	𑜗 gha IPA: /ɡʱa/	𑜂 nga IPA: /ŋa/
𑝀 ca IPA: /ca/	𑜋 cha IPA: /cʰa/	𑜊 ja IPA: /ɟa/	𑜙 jha IPA: /ɟʱa/	𑜐 nya IPA: /ɲa/
𑝁 ṭa IPA: /ʈa/	𑝂 ṭha IPA: /ʈʰa/	𑝃 ḍa IPA: /ɖa/	𑝄 ḍha IPA: /ɖʱa/	𑝅 ṇa IPA: /ɳa/
𑜄𑜅 ta IPA: /ta/ (Note: The second version of this letter is ta and ja conjoined, with ta shortened.)	𑜌 tha IPA: /tʰa/	𑜓 da IPA: /da/	𑜔 dha IPA: /dʱa/	𑜃 na IPA: /na/
𑜆 pa IPA: /pa/	𑜇 pha IPA: /pʰa/	𑜈𑜚 ba IPA: /ba/ (Note: A font variant of Ba. The second version is used as va in Sajjhaya spelling.)	𑜘 bha IPA: /bʱa/	𑜉 ma IPA: /ma/
𑜍 ra IPA: /ra/	𑜎 la IPA: /la/	𑝆 ḷa IPA: /ɭa/	𑜏 sa IPA: /sa/	𑜑 ha IPA: /ha/
		𑜒 a (Note: This letter is not an independent vowel, but acts as a null consonant that can be combined with a vowel diacritic to write initial vowels.)		

The following medial consonant diacritics are used to form consonant clusters with /l/ and /r/, such as /kl/ and /kr/.

Medial consonants
◌𑜝 Medial la IPA: /l/	◌𑜞 Medial ra IPA: /r/	◌𑜟 IPA: /r/ Medial ligating ra

=== Vowels ===
The following vowel diacritics are added to an initial consonant:

Vowel diacritics
𑜠 a IPA: /a/	𑜡 aa IPA: /a:/	◌𑜢 i IPA: /i/	◌𑜣 ii IPA: /i:/	◌𑜤 u IPA: /u/	◌𑜥 uu IPA: /u:/	𑜦 e IPA: /e/	◌𑜩 ai IPA: /ai/	◌𑜨 o IPA: /o/	◌𑜧 aw IPA: /aw/	◌𑜪 am IPA: /am/

To write a consonant without a vowel, the virama ⟨◌𑜫⟩ is used.

== Punctuation ==
The following characters are used for punctuation:

Punctuation
𑜼 Separates small sections.	𑜽 Separates sections.	𑜾 Marks paragraphs.	𑜿 Exclamation mark.

== Numerals ==
The Ahom script contains its own set of numerals:

Ahom numerals
0 𑜰	1 𑜱	2 𑜲	3 𑜳	4 𑜴	5 𑜵	6 𑜶	7 𑜷	8 𑜸	9 𑜹	10 𑜺	20 𑜻

== Unicode ==
Ahom script was added to the Unicode Standard in June, 2015 with the release of version 8.0. The Ahom block was expended by 16 code points with Unicode 14.0.

The Unicode block for Ahom is U+11700–U+1174F:

Ahom^{[1]}^{[2]} Official Unicode Consortium code chart (PDF)
	0	1	2	3	4	5	6	7	8	9	A	B	C	D	E	F
U+1170x	𑜀	𑜁	𑜂	𑜃	𑜄	𑜅	𑜆	𑜇	𑜈	𑜉	𑜊	𑜋	𑜌	𑜍	𑜎	𑜏
U+1171x	𑜐	𑜑	𑜒	𑜓	𑜔	𑜕	𑜖	𑜗	𑜘	𑜙	𑜚			𑜝	𑜞	𑜟
U+1172x	𑜠	𑜡	𑜢	𑜣	𑜤	𑜥	𑜦	𑜧	𑜨	𑜩	𑜪	𑜫				
U+1173x	𑜰	𑜱	𑜲	𑜳	𑜴	𑜵	𑜶	𑜷	𑜸	𑜹	𑜺	𑜻	𑜼	𑜽	𑜾	𑜿
U+1174x	𑝀	𑝁	𑝂	𑝃	𑝄	𑝅	𑝆									
Notes 1.As of Unicode version 18.0 2.Grey areas indicate non-assigned code points

== See also ==
- List of writing systems
- Ahom people
- Ahom kingdom
- All Tai Ahom Students Union
