= Hemendra Nath Dutta =

Indian archaeologist (born 1952)

Dr. Hemendra Nath Dutta
- Born: 1 November 1952 (age 73)
- Citizenship: Indian
- Occupations: Academic, Historian

Dr Hemendra Nath Dutta (also spelled as Hemendranath Dutta) is an Indian academician, archaeologist who served as the Director, Directorate of Archaeology, Cultural Affairs Department, Government of Assam. He is also a former Vice Chancellor, International University Nagaland, (earlier The Global Open University Nagaland).

== Early life and career ==
He was born on 1 November 1952. He completed his High School Leaving Certificate (HSLC) from Assam Board of Secondary Education in 1969, BA from Dibrugarh University in 1973, master's degree in arts from Gauhati University in 1975. He completed his Doctor of Philosophy from Gauhati University in 1998. His thesis title was: "Art and archaeology of the Doiyang Dhansiri valley of Assam".

== Publications ==
Some of the selected books authored and edited by Dutta include the following:

- Directorate of Archaeology, Assam, Since its Inception (2002)
- Assam Archaeology, 2003-2004- A review (2008)
- List of protected Archaeological Sites and Monuments of Assam, under the Directorate of Archaeology, Assam (English) (2005)
- Puratatwik Kala Sampad Samuhar Panjikaran (1989)
- Ambari Archaeological Site : An Interim Report, (2006)
- Conservation of Archaeological Sites and Monuments : A Report (2007)
- A Project Proposal on Protection, Preservation and Promotion of Sattra Institutions of Assam (2006)
- A Few Inscriptional Discoveries in Assam (2010)
- History, Art and Archaeology of Doiyang Dhansiri Valley Assam (2012)
- A brief report on excavation at Paglatek archaeological siteGoalpara district, 2004-2005
- Eastern Himalayan domestic architecture with special reference to the North East India
- A guide book on archaeological sites and monuments listed by Directorate of Archaeology, Assam
- A brief report on excavation at Paglatek archaeological site Goalpara district, 2004-2005
