= Ministry of Science and Technology (India) =

Government ministry in India

- Branch of Government of India

- Ministry of Science & Technology

Central overview
- Formed: May 1971
- Jurisdiction: Government of India
- Headquarters: New Delhi
- Annual budget: ₹38,260.94 crore (US$4.0 billion) (2026-27 est.)
- Minister responsible: Dr. Jitendra Singh (I/C)
- Central executive: Minister of Science and Technology
- Website: most.gov.in

The Ministry of Science and Technology is the Indian government ministry charged with formulation and administration of the rules and regulations and laws relating to science and technology in India.

== Organisation ==
The ministry includes the following departments:

=== Department of Biotechnology ===
Autonomous Institutes

- National Institute of Immunology, Delhi
- National Centre for Cell Science, Pune
- National Brain Research Centre, Manesar
- Kalam Institute of Health Technology, Visakhapatnam
- Centre for DNA Fingerprinting and Diagnostics, Hyderabad
- Institute of Bioresources and Sustainable Development, Imphal
- National Institute of Plant Genome Research, Delhi
- Institute for Stem Cell Science and Regenerative Medicine, Bangalore
- Institute of Life Sciences, Bhubaneshwar
- Rajiv Gandhi Centre for Biotechnology, Thiruvananthapuram
- Regional Centre for Biotechnology, Faridabad
- Translational Health Science and Technology Institute, Faridabad
- National Institute of Animal Biotechnology, Hyderabad
- National Institute of Biomedical Genomics, Kalyani, West Bengal
- International Advanced Research Centre for Powder Metallurgy and New Materials, Hyderabad

Public Sector Undertakings

- Bharat Immunologicals and Biologicals Corporation Limited (BIBCOL), Bulandshahar, Uttar Pradesh
- Indian Vaccine Corporation Limited, Delhi

==== Scientific Directorates ====
- Biomanufacturing
- Information Systems Biology
- Bio-Wealth & Biosafety
- Data Monitoring and Analysis
- Health & Wellness
- Technology, Capacity & Partnerships
- Emerging Frontiers in Biotechnology
- Global Innovations
- Health Interventions and Equity
- Advanced Biofuels and Sustainability

=== Department of Scientific and Industrial Research ===
- Technology Promotion, Development and Utilization Programme (TPDU)
  - Industrial R&D Promotion Programme (IRDPP)
  - Technology Development and Innovation Programme (TDIP)
    - Technology Development and Demonstration Programme (TDDP)
    - Technopreneur Promotion Programme (TePP)
  - Technology Management Programme (TMP)
  - International Technology Transfer Programme (ITTP)
  - Consultancy Promotion Programme (CPP)
  - Technology Information Facilitation Programme (TIFP)
  - Technology Development Utilization Programme for Women (TDUPW)
- Autonomous institutions
  - Council of Scientific and Industrial Research (CSIR)
  - Jawaharlal Nehru Centre for Advanced Scientific Research, Bangalore
- Public sector enterprises
  - National Research Development Corporation (NRDC)
  - Central Electronics Limited (CEL)
- Asian and Pacific Centre for Transfer of Technology (APCTT)
- Administration
- Finance

=== Department of Science and Technology ===
- Technology Information, Forecasting and Assessment Council (TIFAC)
- Vigyan Prasar
- National Accreditation Board for Testing and Calibration Laboratories (NABL)
- Bharat Space Education Research Centre (BSERC)
- National Atlas and Thematic Mapping Organisation (NATMO), Calcutta
- Survey of India, Dehradun
- IISc
- IISERs
- Institute of Nano Science and Technology, Mohali
- Institute for Medical Sciences and Technology, Trivandrum
- National Quantum Mission India
- Wadia Institute of Himalayan Geology, Dehradun
- Raman Research Institute
- Indian National Science Academy, New Delhi
- Indian Institute of Geomagnetism
- Centre for Nano and Soft Matter Sciences, Bengaluru

==== Autonomous Body ====
- National Anusandhan Research Foundation
- National Innovation Foundation

==== Attached Institutions ====
- NATMO
- Survey of India

==== Professional Bodies ====
- Indian Science Congress Association, Kolkata
- Indian National Science Academy, New Delhi
- Indian Academy Of Sciences, Bangalore
- Indian National Academy Of Engineering, New Delhi
- National Academy Of Sciences, Allahabad

==== Statutory Bodies ====
- Science and Engineering Research Board
- Technology Development Board
- Sree Chitra Tirunal Institute for Medical Sciences and Technology

==== International Bi-lateral Institutions ====
- Indo-French Centre for Promotion of Advanced Research (IFCPAR / CEFIPRA)
- Indo-US Science & Technology Forum (IUSSTF)
- Indo-German Science & Technology Centre (IGSTC)

== List of ministers ==
The Minister of Science and Technology is the head of the ministry. It is a key office in the Union Cabinet.

#	Portrait	Name	Term of office		Duration	Prime Minister	Political party
1		C. Subramaniam	2 May 1971	10 October 1974	3 years, 161 days	Indira Gandhi	Indian National Congress (R)
2		T. A. Pai	10 October 1974	2 January 1975	84 days	Indira Gandhi	Indian National Congress (R)
3		Indira Gandhi	2 January 1975	24 March 1977	2 years, 81 days	Indira Gandhi	Indian National Congress (R)
(3)		Indira Gandhi	19 October 1980	31 October 1984	4 years, 12 days	Indira Gandhi	Indian National Congress (I)
4		Rajiv Gandhi	31 December 1984	14 January 1985	14 days	Rajiv Gandhi	Indian National Congress (I)
5		Vishwanath Pratap Singh	5 December 1989	10 November 1990	340 days	V. P. Singh	Janata Dal
6		Chandra Shekhar	10 November 1990	21 June 1991	223 days	Chandra Shekhar	Samajwadi Janata Party (Rashtriya)
7		P. V. Narasimha Rao	21 June 1991	16 May 1996	4 years, 330 days	P. V. Narasimha Rao	Indian National Congress (I)
8		Atal Bihari Vajpayee	16 May 1996	1 June 1996	16 days	Atal Bihari Vajpayee	Bharatiya Janata Party
9		H. D. Dewe Gowda	1 June 1996	29 June 1996	28 days	Devegowda	Janata Dal
10		Yoginder K Alagh (Independent Charge)	29 June 1996	19 March 1998	1 year, 263 days	Devegowda I. K. Gujral	Independent
11		Murli Manohar Joshi	19 March 1998	22 May 2004	6 years, 64 days	Atal Bihari Vajpayee	Bharatiya Janata Party
12		Kapil Sibal (Independent Charge till 29-Jan-2006)	23 May 2004	22 May 2009	4 years, 364 days	Manmohan Singh	Indian National Congress
13		Prithviraj Chavan (Independent Charge)	28 May 2009	10 November 2010	1 year, 166 days	Manmohan Singh	Indian National Congress
(12)		Kapil Sibal	10 November 2010	19 January 2011	70 days	Manmohan Singh	Indian National Congress
14		Pawan Kumar Bansal	19 January 2011	12 July 2011	174 days	Manmohan Singh	Indian National Congress
15		Vilasrao Deshmukh	12 July 2011	10 August 2012	1 year, 29 days	Manmohan Singh	Indian National Congress
16		Vayalar Ravi	14 August 2012	28 October 2012	79 days	Manmohan Singh	Indian National Congress
17		Jaipal Reddy	28 October 2012	26 May 2014	1 year, 210 days	Manmohan Singh	Indian National Congress
18		Dr. Jitendra Singh (Independent Charge)	26 May 2014	9 November 2014	167 days	Narendra Modi	Bharatiya Janata Party
19		Harsh Vardhan	9 November 2014	7 July 2021	6 years, 240 days	Narendra Modi	Bharatiya Janata Party
(18)		Dr. Jitendra Singh (Independent Charge)	7 July 2021	Incumbent	5 years, 33 days	Narendra Modi	Bharatiya Janata Party

== List of ministers of state ==
Minister of State in the Ministry of Science and Technolog
Minister of state	Portrait	Political party	Term		Years
Santosh Kumar Gangwar		Bharatiya Janata Party	13 October 1999	22 November 1999	40 days
Bachi Singh Rawat		Bharatiya Janata Party	22 November 1999	22 May 2004	4 years, 182 days
Y. S. Chowdary		Telugu Desam Party	9 November 2014	8 March 2018	3 years, 119 days

== See also ==
- Ministry of Earth Sciences (India)

== Media ==
In the year 2010, the National Geographic Channel and Ministry of Science and Technology came together to create a documentary film on reducing carbon footprint. The film was titled Cutting Carbon Footprint
