= Majuli College =

College in Assam

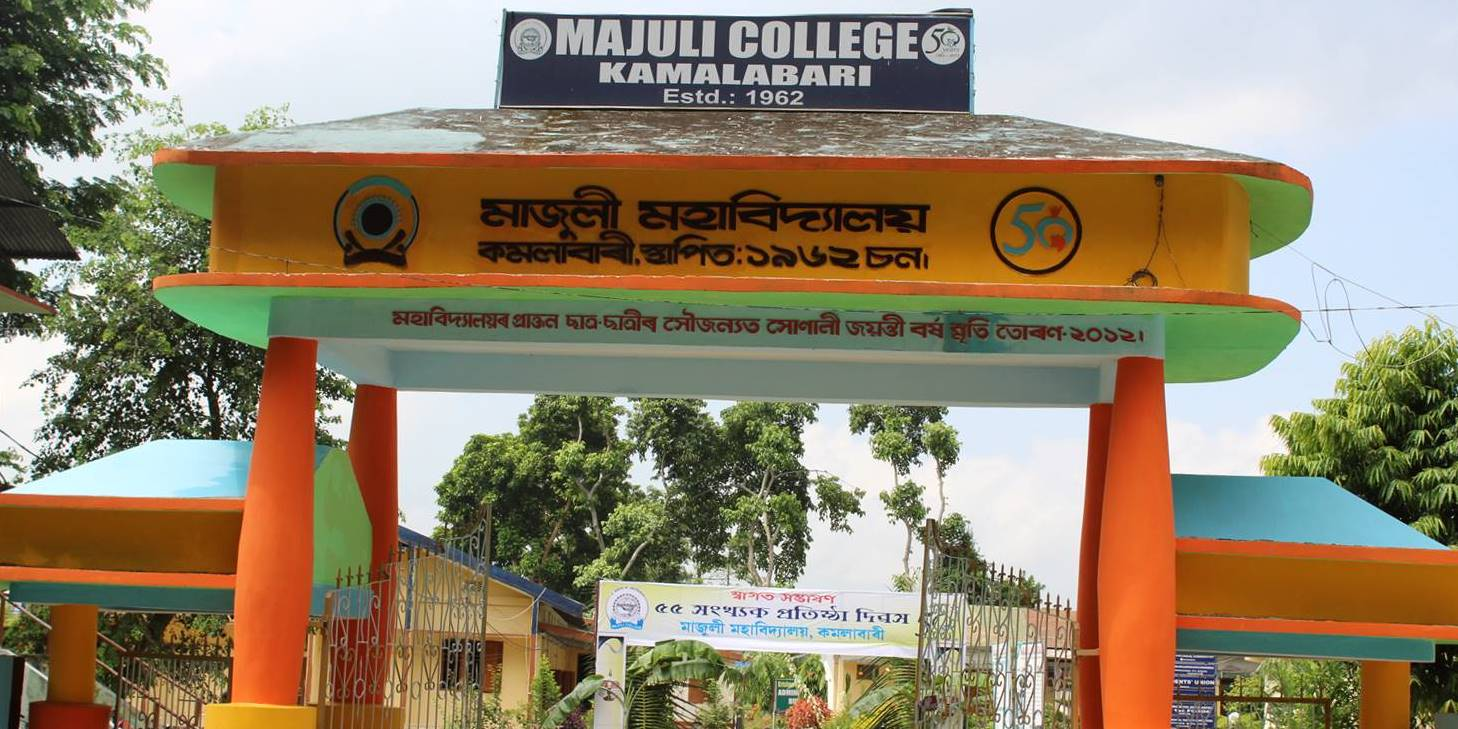
- Majuli College Entrance Gate
- Motto: Lead us from darkness to brightness
- Type: AHSEC affiliated & Dibrugarh University affiliated College
- Established: 17 September 1962
- Affiliations: Dibrugarh University
- Principal: Dr. Debajit Saikia
- Location: Majuli, Assam, India; 26.7573°N 94.2046°E
- Campus: Urban
- Website: www.majulicollege.in

Majuli College is based at Kamalabari in Majuli, Assam, India. It was founded in 1962, and is affiliated to AHSEC and Dibrugarh University besides being recognized by the University Grants Commission of India (UGC). The college is located on a fortified campus surrounded by a few Vaishnavite monasteries called satras and lush-green paddy fields.

== Courses ==
The college offers Higher Secondary, Undergraduate and Postgraduate courses. It periodically organizes career counselling sessions, symposia and popular and motivational talks, and has started job-oriented multi-utility diploma and certificate courses designed to help students build careers. The college also facilitates undergraduate and postgraduate education through distance learning with Krishna Kanta Handiqui State Open University (KKHSOU) and Dibrugarh University.

Higher Secondary Programme

- Arts
- Science

Bachelor Programme

- Bachelor of Arts
- Bachelor of Science

Masters Programme

- Postgraduate courses under the Distance Education Scheme of Dibrugarh University in Assamese language, Economics, History, Mathematics, Political Science and Sociology.

== Library ==
The college provides digital classroom and library facilities to students. In 2012, the library was named after the college's first principal as Shiksha Ratna Atul Chandra Goswami Library.

== Notable alumni ==
- Tarun Chandra Pamegam is a former vice president of the Asam Sahitya Sabha.

== College Magazine ==
The college has published an annual magazine, "Majulian", formerly the "Majuli College Magazine", since 1965.
