= Jiten Hazarika =

Indian academic administrator

Prof. Jiten Hazarika
- Citizenship: Indian
- Education: Dibrugarh University (M.Sc in Statistics; Ph.D. in Econometrics)
- Occupations: Academic, Professor
- Employer: Dibrugarh University
- Title: Vice Chancellor of Dibrugarh University

Jiten Hazarika is an Indian academic and the current Vice-Chancellor of Dibrugarh University. He is also the interim Vice Chancellor of Sri Sri Aniruddhadeva Sports University, Dibrugarh.

== Life and career ==
He pursued B.Sc. with a major in Statistics, M.Sc. in Statistics and Ph.D. in Econometrics from Dibrugarh University.

Jiten Hazarika is a Professor in Statistics (On lien), previously served as the Registrar, Dibrugarh University.

He took charge as the VC, Dibrugarh University, his alma mater in Aug 2022. He succeeded Prof. Lila Kanta Nath.

His research areas included econometrics, applied statistics, time series analysis, biostatistics, and other interconnected areas.

== Awards ==
Some of the awards he received include the following:

- Academisthan's Teacher of the year Awards for 2021 conferred by Academisthan Foundation
- Indian Humanitarian Award (2021) for sustained humanitarian work during the COVID-19 pandemic, presented by the Indian Book of Records.
- Bharat Ratna Dr. Abdul Kalam Gold Medal Award by Global Economic Progress Research Association, New Delhi.
