= Joyanti Chutia =

Indian physicist (born 1948)

- Born: 1948 (age 77–78); Sivasagar, Assam, India
- Citizenship: India
- Education: Cotton University (BSc) Dibrugarh University (MSc, PhD) University of Pune
- Scientific career
- Fields: Physicist
- Workplaces: Institute of Advanced Study in Science and Technology

Joyanti Chutia is an Indian physicist who specializes in solid-state physics and plasma physics. She was among the first women who have headed scientific institutions in India when she became the director of the Institute of Advanced Study in Science and Technology in Guwahati, Assam, which is the first major research institution in North East India. She is a fellow of National Academy of Sciences. She is an emeritus scientist at the Department of Science & Technology in the Government of India.

== Early life and education ==
Chutia was one of the first girls to take Mathematics as a main subject in her school. She later studied physics at Cotton University, Assam where she obtained a BSc in 1967. She continued teaching at Cotton College before obtaining an MSc in physics at Dibrugarh University in 1969. Following this, Chutia taught for some time as a lecturer, eventually deciding to continue with research by pursuing a PhD at Dibrugarh University on a fellowship in 1976. Her research focused on the conduction mechanism of thin polymer films and she was awarded her degree in 1981.

== Career ==
After her PhD, Chutia continued her research at Dibrugarh University for another year as a CSIR-postdoctoral fellow. She entered the field of plasma physics at the Physical Research Laboratory in Ahmedabad and then joined the Institute for Plasma Research in Gandhinagar. She then returned to the Institute of Advanced Study in Science and Technology as a faculty member and set up the Plasma Physics Laboratory.

After finishing a fellowship awarded by the Japanese government in 1988 to work at the Plasma Laboratory of the Institute of Space and Astronautical Science, Tokyo, in 2005 she became the director of the Institute of Advanced Study in Science and Technology.

== Research ==
Chutia's research focuses on biomedicine, material science and biotechnology. Her research has led to the development of a highly durable and degradable wound suturing material from Muga Silk.
