= Amguri =

Town in Assam, India

- town
- Location in Assam, India Amguri (India)
- Coordinates: 26.810°N 94.523°E
- Country: India
- State: Assam
- District: Sivasagar

Government
  - Body: Amguri Municipal Board

Population (2011)
  - Total: 8,002

Languages
  - Official: Assamese
- Time zone: UTC+5:30 (IST)
- PIN: 785680
- Vehicle registration: AS 04

Amguri (IPA: æmˈgʊərɪ/ (Assamese: [amgʊ(ɹ)i]) is a town and municipal area committee in Sivasagar district in the state of Assam, India.

== Geography ==
Amguri is located in the state of Assam, near the border of Nagaland, in north-east India. It has an average elevation of 74 metres (242 feet). It is situated on the bank of the river Jhanji and famous for its tea gardens and oil fields.

== Demographics ==
At the 2001 census, Amguri had a population of 6944. Males constitute 56% of the population and females 44%, and 11% of the population is under 6 years of age. Amguri has a literacy rate of 75%, higher than the national literacy average of 59.5%. In Amguri, 55% of the male and 45% of the female population are literate.

== Transport ==
=== Rail ===
Amguri falls under the Tinsukia railway division of the Northeast Frontier Railway zone.

=== Road ===
Amguri is connected to the neighbouring towns by the National Highway-2( Mokokchung-Amguri Road) which falls under the renumbered North- South Highway system and the Dhodar Ali Road. A good volume of traffic to and from the neighbouring towns traverse through Amguri on NH-2( Mokokchung-Amguri Road) to the Indian state of Nagaland.

== Notable educational institutions ==
- Auniati Hemchandradev Higher Secondary School (Science and Commerce stream only at 10+2 level)
- Amguri Girls High School
- Amguri College
- National Academy (Junior College)
- Don Bosco High School
- Neelakshi Memorial Academy Senior Secondary School
- Jnan Bikash Vidyapith
- Arunodoi Academy

== Politics ==
Amguri Town is part of the 103rd Amguri Legislative Assembly. AGP's Prodip Hazarika is the current MLA of this constituency. Amguri is part of the Jorhat (Lok Sabha constituency). On 13th August 2023, Prodip Hazarika resigned from Asom Gana Parishad due to abolishment of Amguri (Vidhan Sabha constituency).

== Health ==
- Amguri town has one CHC.

== Notable people ==
- Someswar Kakoti, veteran freedom fighter
