= Lila Gogoi =

Indian historian

Dr. Lila Gogoi
- Born: 25 November 1930; Cherekapar, Hatimuria Gaon, Sivasagar Residence = Dibrugarh, Lila Gogoi Path
- Died: 23 July 1994 (aged 63); Cherekapar, Sivasagar
- Occupations: Writer, Educationist, Historian and Story writer
- Writing career
- Genre: Assamese Literature
- Subjects: Novel, Article, poem and history

Lila Gogoi was a writer, educationist and historian. He was the H. O. D. of the Assamese department, Dibrugarh University and Honorary Director, Department of Historical and Antiquarian Studies in Assam. He was also the President of Assam Sahitya Sabha in the session of 1994.

== Works ==
Literature

Sontara (1954), Khara Shiyalor Biya (1954), Ponakanar Sapon (1955), Horogor Mukuta (1957), Dokait Kon (1957), Kopling Siga Rail (1959), Rangmanor Katha (1963), Nilakhamor Sithi (1963), Beybering Chithi (1976), Brikudar Baruar Biya (1977, 1978), Bishes Ki Likhim (1978), Ghergheri Bus (1981), Bihugeet aru banghosha, Giti Malanca(1964), Asamiya Loka-sahityar Ruprekha (1968).

Historical

Buranjiye Parasha Nagar (1957), Herua Dinor Kotha (1957), Lachit Borphukan (1960), Ahom Jati aru Asamiya Sanskriti (1961), Simantar Mati aru Manuh (1963), Sahitya-sanskritir Buranji (1972), Asamor Sanskriti (1982), The Buranjis, historical literature of Assam:a critical survey(1986), The Tai Khamtis(1971), The Tai Khamtis of the North East(1990), The History of the system of Ahom Administration(1991), Beli Maar Gol(1983), Buranjiye Katha Koi(1991)

== Monuments ==
A hostel of Dibrugarh University is dedicated to Dr. Lila Gogoi. The name of the hostel is 'Leela Gogoi Memorial Gobeshak Chatra Nivas'.
