= Jorhat Law College =

Law college in Assam

- Type: Govt. Law College
- Established: 1964 (62 years ago)
- Affiliations: Dibrugarh University
- Principal: Dr. Ajoy Kr Das Ph.D, Prabin(Hindi), LL.M., M.A(Eng), B.Sc.
- Director: Dr. Afruza Nasrin Islam LL.B, B.Ed., M.A, Ph.D
- Location: Jorhat, Assam, India
- Website: www.jorhatlawcollege.edu.in

Jorhat Law College is a Government law school situated at Jorhat in the Indian state of Assam. It offers 3 years law courses, 5 Year Integrated B.A. LL.B.and LL.B. courses affiliated to Dibrugarh University. This College is recognised by Bar Council of India, New Delhi.

== History ==
Jorhat Law College is the first law college in Upper Assam Division and second in the Northeast India. This college was established in 1964 by Nalini Nath Phukan Memorial and Educational Trust. This college was affiliated to Gauhati University at the time of initiation latter come under the Dibrugarh university.
