= Kiran Seth =

Indian academic

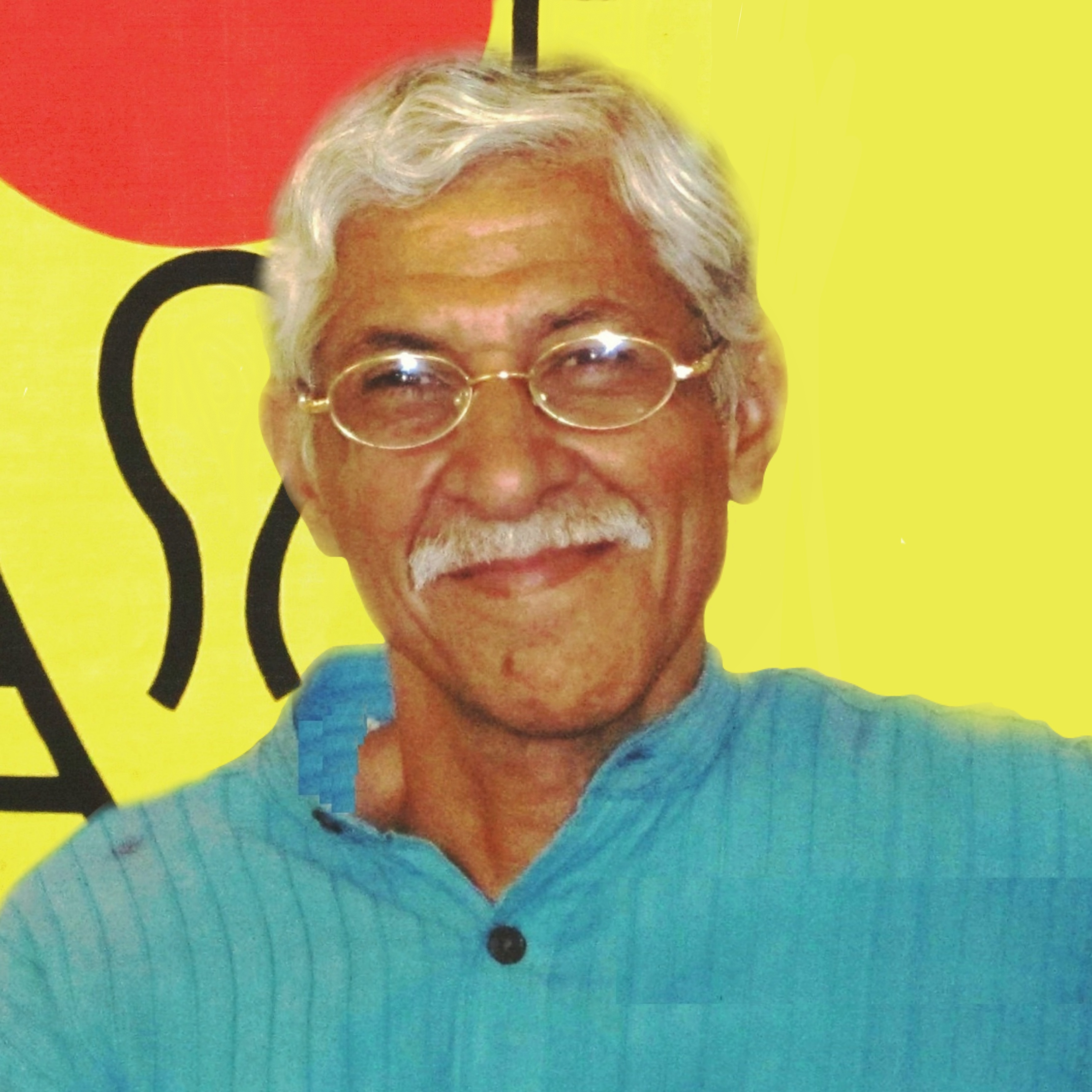
- Seth in March 2014
- Born: 27 April 1949 (age 77)
- Education: BTech (1970); IIT Kharagpur, PhD (1974); Columbia University
- Alma mater: IIT Kharagpur, Columbia University
- Occupation: Professor Emeritus
- Employer: IIT Delhi
- Known for: SPIC MACAY
- Parents: Bhoj Raj Seth (father); Bhagawathi Seth (mother)

Kiran Seth (born 1949) is Ex Professor and Professor Emeritus at Indian Institute of Technology Delhi who has done teaching and research in the field of Operations Research there since 1976. He is most known as the founder of SPIC MACAY (1977), a non-profit organisation which promotes Indian classical music, Indian classical dance, folk forms, yoga and meditation, traditional handlooms and handicrafts, cinema classics, and other aspects of Indian culture, amongst youth over the world; doing about 5000 events yearly in about 500 towns in India and about 50 abroad through conventions, baithaks, lecture demonstrations and musical fests.

In 2009, he was awarded the Padma Shri by the Government of India.

== Early life and education ==
His father, Bhojraj Seth, was a mathematician and the first professor at the IIT Kharagpur, established in 1951, while his mother Bhagawati Seth was a homemaker.

== Career ==
Seth graduated from the Indian Institute of Technology Kharagpur (IIT Kharagpur). He subsequently earned a Ph.D. from Columbia University in New York, United States. Following his doctoral studies, he worked as a research scientist at Bell Laboratories in the United States before returning to India. He joined IIT Delhi, where he taught and conducted research in the field of operations research for over forty five years, eventually retiring as Professor Emeritus.

It was at IIT Delhi that he founded SPIC MACAY in 1977.

He served as Vice-Chairman of the Governing Council of the Film and Television Institute of India (FTII) in Pune from 2012 to 2014.

== SPIC MACAY ==
Today the movement conducts over five thousand programmes every year that includes concerts, lec-dems, talks, yoga workshops, classic film shows, theatre shows and craft workshops in schools and colleges so that young people might be inspired.
