= Ahom (Unicode block) =

- Range: U+11700..U+1174F (80 code points)
- Plane: SMP
- Scripts: Ahom
- Major alphabets: Ahom
- Assigned: 65 code points
- Unused: 15 reserved code points

Unicode version history
- 8.0 (2015): 57 (+57)
- 11.0 (2018): 58 (+1)
- 14.0 (2021): 65 (+7)

Unicode documentation
- Code chart ∣ Web page
- Note: The Ahom block was expanded by 16 code points in Unicode 14.0.

Ahom is a Unicode block containing characters used for writing the Ahom alphabet, which was used to write the Ahom language spoken by the Ahom people in Assam between the 13th and the 18th centuries.

The block size was expanded by 16 code points in Unicode version 14.0 (version 13: 1173F → version 14: 1174F), and 7 more characters were defined. This was the first block to expand since Unicode version 1.1.

Ahom^{[1]}^{[2]} Official Unicode Consortium code chart (PDF)
	0	1	2	3	4	5	6	7	8	9	A	B	C	D	E	F
U+1170x	𑜀	𑜁	𑜂	𑜃	𑜄	𑜅	𑜆	𑜇	𑜈	𑜉	𑜊	𑜋	𑜌	𑜍	𑜎	𑜏
U+1171x	𑜐	𑜑	𑜒	𑜓	𑜔	𑜕	𑜖	𑜗	𑜘	𑜙	𑜚			𑜝	𑜞	𑜟
U+1172x	𑜠	𑜡	𑜢	𑜣	𑜤	𑜥	𑜦	𑜧	𑜨	𑜩	𑜪	𑜫				
U+1173x	𑜰	𑜱	𑜲	𑜳	𑜴	𑜵	𑜶	𑜷	𑜸	𑜹	𑜺	𑜻	𑜼	𑜽	𑜾	𑜿
U+1174x	𑝀	𑝁	𑝂	𑝃	𑝄	𑝅	𑝆									
Notes: 1. As of Unicode version 16.0; 2. Grey areas indicate non-assigned code points

== History ==
The following Unicode-related documents record the purpose and process of defining specific characters in the Ahom block:

Version	Final code points (Note: Proposed code points and characters names may differ from final code points and names)	Count	L2 ID	WG2 ID	Document
8.0	U+11700..11719, 1171D..1172B, 11730..1173F	57	L2/10-359	N3928	Hosken, Martin; Morey, Stephen (2010-09-17), Preliminary Proposal to add the Ahom Script in the SMP of the UCS
8.0	U+11700..11719, 1171D..1172B, 11730..1173F	57	L2/12-222	N4290	Hosken, Martin; Morey, Stephen (2012-07-02), Proposal to add the Ahom Script in the SMP of the UCS
8.0	U+11700..11719, 1171D..1172B, 11730..1173F	57	L2/12-267		Anderson, Deborah; McGowan, Rick; Whistler, Ken (2012-07-21), "V. AHOM", Review of Indic-related documents and Recommendations to the UTC
8.0	U+11700..11719, 1171D..1172B, 11730..1173F	57	L2/12-309R	N4321R	Hosken, Martin (2012-10-23), Revised Proposal to add the Ahom Script in the SMP of the UCS
8.0	U+11700..11719, 1171D..1172B, 11730..1173F	57	L2/12-343R2		Moore, Lisa (2012-12-04), "Consensus 133-C16", UTC #133 Minutes
8.0	U+11700..11719, 1171D..1172B, 11730..1173F	57		N4353 (pdf, doc)	"M60.09", Unconfirmed minutes of WG 2 meeting 60, 2013-05-23
8.0	U+11700..11719, 1171D..1172B, 11730..1173F	57	L2/21-123		Cummings, Craig (2021-08-03), "Consensus 168-C3", Draft Minutes of UTC Meeting 168, "Remove the assignment of GCB=SpacingMark for U+11720..U+11721 AHOM VOWEL SIGN A and AA, letting them default to GCB=Other, for Unicode version 14.0."
11.0	U+1171A	1	L2/15-272		Hosken, Martin; Morey, Stephen (2015-10-26), Proposal to add one extra character to the Ahom Block
11.0	U+1171A	1	L2/15-254		Moore, Lisa (2015-11-16), "D.13", UTC #145 Minutes
14.0	U+11740..11746	7	L2/20-258		Morey, Stephen (2020-09-29), Proposal to encode additional signs for the Tai Ahom script
14.0	U+11740..11746	7	L2/20-250		Anderson, Deborah; Whistler, Ken; Pournader, Roozbeh; Moore, Lisa; Constable, Peter; Liang, Hai (2020-10-01), "9. Ahom", Recommendations to UTC #165 October 2020 on Script Proposals
14.0	U+11740..11746	7	L2/20-237		Moore, Lisa (2020-10-27), "Consensus 165-C17", UTC #165 Minutes
