= Amguri College =

College in Assam, India

- Motto in English: Vision is our Horizon
- Established: 17 July 1967 (59 years ago)
- Parent institution: AHSEC
- Accreditation: UGC
- Academic affiliations: Dibrugarh University, Krishna Kanta Handiqui State Open University
- Vice-president: Apurba Dutta (Ujjal)
- Principal: Ashfia Sultana
- Students: 1500+
- Location: Amguri, Assam, India; 26.8048°N 94.5367°E
- Campus: Rural
- Website: www.amguricollege.com

Amguri College is located in Amguri, Assam, India. It was founded on 17 July 1967. The college is affiliated to Dibrugarh University and recognized by University Grants Commission (UGC).

== History ==
The Amguri College was established on 17 July 1967. The college is brought under the deficit system if Grant-in-Aid in 1977 and affiliates to the Dibrugarh University.

== Other information ==
The college has more than 15 publications. These publications are assigned with ISBN/ISSN. They are as below.

- College Magazine (published annually)
- Monoshwini (published annually by women cell of the college).
- Intellectus (A Multidisciplinary Journal published annually)
- Journal in social science (published annually)
- Gender troubles: a study in North East India (seminar proceedings)
- Shankardevor Sahitya aru Anubad Reeti
- Mirour
- Prasar Madhyamot Asomiya Bhasar Proyug aru iyar Grahanjugyata (seminar abstract)
- Athletes
- Implementation of social welfare schemes in India with special reference to Assam : Issues and challenges (proceedings volume of National Seminar)

== Uniform ==
- For H.S. Students:
  - For Boys: Light mustard color shirt and black formal pant.
  - For Girls: White Chalwar & Kurta and Light mustard colored Dupatta.

(Mekhela Chaddar is not allowed for H.S. students)

- For Degree Students:
  - For Boys : White Shirt and Black pant.
  - For Girls : White Blouse, Muga (or Muga colored) Mekhela, White Chadar with Navy Blue border or White Chalwar & Kurta and Navy blue Dupatta.

== Courses ==
The college offers:

- Two year Higher Secondary course, Arts and Commerce (Under AHSEC).
- B.A. and B.Com. Semester system (Dibrugarh University).
- Computer Courses.
- Post-Graduate Diploma in Computer Application (PGDCA) (12 months).

== Distance Education Programme ==
Apart from the regular courses, the college has affiliated study centres for distance mode education programme under Krishna Kanta Handiqui State Open University (KKHSOU) and Dibrugarh University Distance Education Council. The various programmes offered in these study centres are BPP, BA, B.Com., BMC, BBA, D.Ei.Ed, MA, MSW and B.Ei.Ed. Besides, Post Graduation Course in English and B.Ed. are also likely to be started from this academic session. These programmes are intended to meet the needs of ambitious employed persons who are desirous to pursue higher education.
