= Bhoj Raj Seth =

Indian academic (1907-1979)

- Born: 27 August 1907; Bhura, Panjab, Delhi
- Died: 12 December 1979 (aged 72)
- Occupations: professor emeritus; lecturer; writer; vice chancellor
- Employer: IIT Delhi
- Children: Kiran Seth (son)

Academic background
- Education: University of London (PhD); Indian Institute of Technology (DSc)
- Alma mater: IIT Kharagpur (1937); university of London (1934); University of Delhi (1939)
- Thesis: Finite Strain in Elastic Problems (1935)
- Doctoral advisor: Louis Napoleon George Filon

Academic work
- Era: Contemporary philosophy
- Institutions: IIT Kharagpur
- Main interests: Elasticity, Plasticity, Fluid Mechanics

Bhoj Raj Seth (27 August 1907 – 12 December 1979), known by his initials B. R. Seth, was an Indian professor of engineering and the father of Kiran Seth. He was the first vice chancellor of Dibrugarh University and served in 1966. He also worked in Indian Institute of Technology in Kharagpur.

== Life and career ==
Seth was born in Bhura, Panjab, Delhi. (Note: Bhutan has been cited by sources as the birth place of Seth but the correct name is Bhure, a city in India.) In 1927, he got his bachelor's degree in mathematics. He had his MA degree in the same course from the University of Delhi in 1929. Seth became an applied mathematics lecturer at IIT Kharagpur.

The Seth–Hill family of generalized strain tensors is named after him and Rodney Hill. Seth was the editor of the Journal of Science and Engineering Research of IIT. He died on 12 December 1979.

== Fellowships ==
In 1936, Seth became a fellow of the Indian Academy of Sciences. He was also a fellow of the Indian National Science Academy.

== Selected publications ==
- Seth, B.R (1939). "Two Dimensional Potential Problems Connected with Rectilinear Boundaries". Allahabad Law Journal Press. India.
- Seth, B. R. (1963). Fifty Years of Science in India: Progress of Mathematics. India: Indian Science Congress Association.
- Seth, B.R (1970). "Aelotropic Yield Condition: Transition Problems of Aelotropic Yield and Creep Rupture". International Centre for Mechanical Sciences. 47. Vienna: Springer. doi:10.1007/978-3-7091-2818-3_2.
- Seth, B. (1972). Creep Transition in Cylinders: Course Held at the Department for Mechanics of Deformable Bodies June – July 1972. Austria: Springer Vienna.
- Seth, B. R. (1975). Transition Problems of Aelotropic Yield and Creep Rupture: Course Held at the Department for Mechanics of Deformable Bodies, September - October 1970. Austria: Springer Vienna. ISBN 9783211810798

== Awards and honors ==
Seth was a recipient of the Leonard Euler Gold Medal of the Academy of Sciences of the Soviet Union in 1958 and the Dr. B. C. Roy Award in 1977.

== See also ==
- Order of Vice Chancellors of Dibrugarh University
