= Someswar Kakoti =

Someswar Kakoti (Assamese: সোমেশ্বৰ কাকতী) is a veteran freedom fighter from Amguri, a town in Sibsagar district of Assam. He took part in the Quit India Movement in 1942. On 9 August 2008, he was facilitated by the President of India Smt Pratibha Patil at the Rashtrapati Bhavan, New Delhi.

== Activities ==
During the movement, Kakoti was the Secretary of Amguri Congress Committee. He was the pioneer in starting the first program of the movement in the region for which he had to be the victim of police and military atrocities.

== Arrest ==
In 1930, he was arrested for opposing the Cunningham circular. In 1932, he was imprisoned for six months. In 1940–1941, he was again sent to jail for six months for his active participation in the Satyagraha Movement. Kakoti, following instruction of the head of the Congress party, went underground when a warrant was issued to arrest him under Section 126/A and continued his work for the movement.

== Post Independence ==
Post Independence, Kakoti established schools in the region and later became a teacher. Even after his retirement from school, he still associated himself with local educational institutions, socio-cultural and religious organizations. He also served as a press correspondent for a long time.

== Felicitation ==
- Facilitated with a shawl and wrist watch by the President of India, Smt Pratibha Patil at the Rashtrapati Bhavan, New Delhi on 9 August 2008.
- Facilitated by Media Trust, Assam for his credibility as a press correspondence.
- Received tamrapatras from both Central as well as State government.
