= Institute of Tai Studies and Research =

Language teaching institute in Assam, India

- Type: Diploma course, research
- Established: 2001
- Affiliations: Dibrugarh University
- Religious affiliation: Ban-Phi Ancestor Worship Tai Folk Religion
- Location: Moranhat, Assam, India; 27°10′42″N 94°54′48″E
- Language: Tai-Ahom
- Website: taistudiesmoranhat.org

The Institute of Tai Studies and Research (ITSAR) is a Tai-Ahom language teaching institute in Moran, Charaideo, Assam, India. It is an affiliate autonomous institute under Dibrugarh University and offers a one-year Tai-Ahom language diploma course and a three-month certificate course in spoken Tai-Ahom language affiliated to Dibrugarh University. ITSAR was established in 2001. In every year many foreign scholars from the Tai populated countries like Australia, Germany, Japan, Thailand, China, and Myanmar (Kachin and Shan state) come to the Tai inhabited areas of Assam, Northeast India in search of primary research materials i.e. Scripts on various aspects of the Tai people in North-East India. In the event of this, the establishment of Institute of Tai Studies and Research (ITSAR) is an academic venture which has the potentiality of attracting the scholars, students, and tourists, especially from the Southeast Asian Tai populated countries to Assam.

== Infrastructure ==
- a Library
- a Documentation centre cum Archive
- a Conference Hall
- a Seminar Room
- an Office Chamber
- a Water Fountain
- an Entrance Gate

== Workshops ==
Many workshops were organized by ITSAR. Some of them are -

- India Council of Social Science Research, New Delhi (ICSSR) Sponsored National Seminar on The Tais of Northeast India, 01 - 02, 2002
- Indian Council of Social Science Research (ICSSR), New Delhi Sponsored National Seminar on Cultural Heritage of Mongoloid People in Northeast India, 01 - 02, 2003
