= Jengraimukh College =

Educational institution in Assam

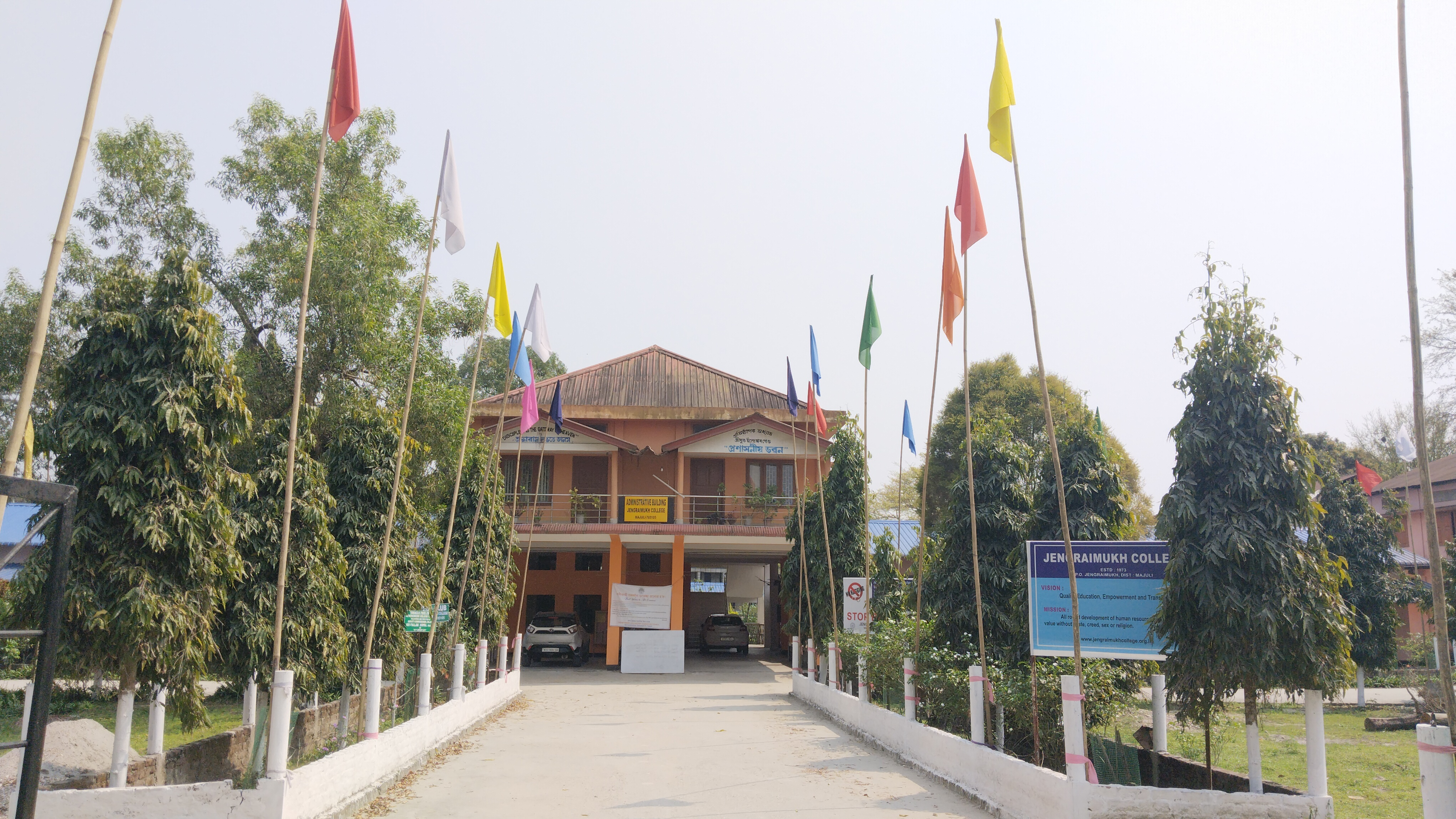
- Type: College
- Established: 1973
- Affiliations: Dibrugarh University
- Principal: Dr. Nabo Kumar Pegu
- Location: Jengraimukh, Majuli, Assam, India; 27.08246°N 94.28906°E
- Website: www.jengraimukhcollege.org

Jengraimukh College is an institution of higher education in Assam, India. It was established in 1973 and is located on the world's largest river island, Majuli. This college is affiliated with the Dibrugarh University.

== History ==
Jengraimukh, one of the epicenters of tribal India, consisting mainly of Mising, and Deori tribes, was an area totally backward explicitly in economic and education fronts. On account of the gaps of transportation and communications due to the barricade of its natural boundaries, people of this vast locality could not send their children for higher education. Lack of education degenerates the sense of economic, social and political awareness, i.e total fall from a nobler state. Keeping this view in mind, to create a general awareness for higher education, a brainstorming idea came in to the mind of a few leading fellows. To translate this grand hypothesis into actually, some leading personalities of locality came to the fore and extend their assistance. Arrangements were made for other infrastructures thus, the beacon light for Tribal people in the auspicious name of Jengraimukh College appeared into reality in the year 1973.

== Departments ==
Arts

- Assamese,
- Political Science,
- Economics,
- History,
- Sociology,
- Education,
- Logic & Philosophy

Science
