= SPIC MACAY =

Learned society promoting Indian cultural heritage

- Formation: 1977; 49 years ago
- Headquarters: Delhi, India
- Founder: Dr. Kiran Seth
- Website: spicmacay.org

The Society for the Promotion of Indian Classical Music And Culture Amongst Youth, abbreviated as SPIC MACAY, is a voluntary youth movement which promotes intangible aspects of Indian cultural heritage by promoting Indian classical music, classical dance, folk music, yoga, meditation, crafts and other aspects of Indian culture; it is a movement with chapters in over 8,000 towns all over the world. SPIC MACAY was established by Dr. Kiran Seth in 1977 at IIT Delhi.

== History ==
Kiran Seth, a young graduate from IIT Kharagpur, was studying for his doctorate at the Columbia University, New York, when he chanced to attend a Dhrupad concert by Ustad Nasir Aminuddin Dagar and Ustad Zia Fariddudin Dagar at the Brooklyn Academy of Music, New York City. On his return to India in 1976, he started teaching and doing research work at IIT Delhi, where he got together with students and started SPIC MACAY in 1977, and its first concert by Junior Dagar Brothers was held at IIT Delhi on 28 March 1978. To promote fitness, music, and Gandhian thought, Kiran Seth undertook a bicycle yatra across India, spreading SPIC MACAY’s mission. Some of its major activities include: FEST series, VIRASAT series, National Conventions for students and teachers, National School Intensives, Music in the Park, the SPIC MACAY Scholarship Programme, heritage walks, talks by eminent thinkers, Yoga camps, screening of Classic Cinema, night-long musical concerts, and workshops like those on Kathak dance. SPIC MACAY has also launched chapters in various cities, such as Tiruchirappalli at IIM, and collaborated with institutions like Auroville to promote cultural heritage. During the COVID-19 pandemic, SPIC MACAY adapted by taking its ‘Anubhav’ programme online from June 1, 2020, to continue engaging youth with Indian culture. The organization has sustained its efforts to make Indian classical music and culture accessible to youth through innovative initiatives.
