= All Tai Ahom Students' Union =

- Chom Hom Lik Hen Tai Ahom Tang Mung
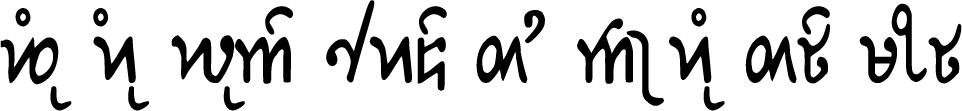
- Abbreviation: ATASU
- Formation: 14 July 1988
- Type: Ethnic
- Legal status: Active
- Purpose: Spearheading the demand of the Tai-Ahom people for being granted the Scheduled Tribe status to the Tai-Ahom people.
- Headquarters: Guwahati, Assam; Sivasagar, Assam
- Region served: Assam, India
- Official language: Ahom language
- Secretary General: Chao Bhaskarjyoti Borgohain
- President: Chao Milan Buragohain
- Working President: Chao Shashanka Dihingia
- Website: https://sites.google.com/site/alltaiahomstudentsunion

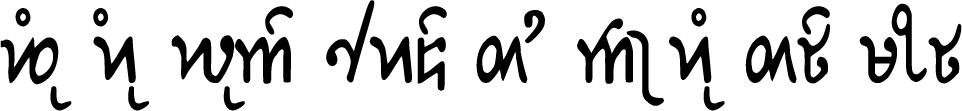
The All Tai Ahom Students' Union (ATASU) (Ahom: , romanised: Chom Hom Lik Hen Tai Ahom Tang Mung) is a students' union in Assam, India.

== History ==
The All Tai Ahom Students Union or ATASU is a students' organization in Assam, India, founded on 14 July 1988.^{[a]} It is the leading students organization of the Ahom people in the state. The Ahom people were the previous ruling elite of the state of Assam in Northeast India. Amrit Kumar Chetia, Promod Boruah, Daya Krishna Gogoi, Arun Gogoi, Puspadhar Saikia, Tutumoni Gogoi and Dimbeswar Gogoi, and Bhuban Gohain were the Chief Adviser, President, Working President, General Secretary, Assistant Secretary, Organizing Secretaries and Executive Member of the Founder Committee respectively. Dimbeswar Gogoi, was murdered by the ULFA on 3 November 1989.

== Demands ==
The ATASU is spearheading the demand for the Ahom people to be granted Scheduled Tribe status.

The ATASU has been using various forums and forms of protest and agitations such as road blockades, bandhs, strikes, etc. to demand the ST status for the Ahom people in the state.

== Organizational structure ==
The ATASU has the following district committees :

1. Tinisukia District Committee
2. Dibrugarh District Committee
3. Dhemaji District Committee
4. North Lakhimpur District Committee
5. Sivasagar District Committee
6. Charaideo District Committee
7. Jorhat District Committee
8. Golaghat District Committee
9. Kamrup District Committee
10. Karbi Anglong District Committee
11. Nagaon District Committee
12. Morigaon District Committee
13. Pasighat District Committee (Arunachal Pradesh)

Karbi Anglong Tai Ahom Students' Union hosted Brihattar Bokajan Rongali Bihu Adoroni (Greater Bokajan Rongali Bihu Celebration) in the middle of April from the year 2010 as a grand festival of Bokajan sub-division of the district. They also host Assam Divas (Sukapha Divas) every year at 2 December. Among the notable members of Karbi Anglong District Tai Ahom Students' Union, Pradyut Pawan Gogoi founded Greater Guwahati Tai Ahom Freshmen Social at Cotton College and the official website of All Tai Ahom Students' Union as the Education Secretary of the organization. He was the first Education Secretary of this ethnic group's organization.

== See also ==
- Ahom people
- Ahom language
- Ahom Kingdom
- All Assam Students’ Union

== Notes ==
a. The founding is celebrated over 2 days, from 14 to 15 July

== Sources ==
- Phukan, Monuj (2005), Phukan 2005, ISBN 8183640060
