= Karabi Deka Hazarika =

Indian writer (born 1953)

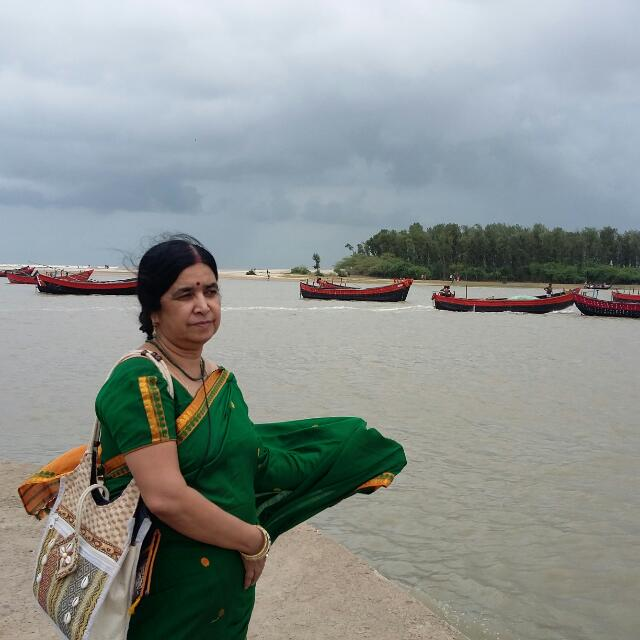
- Born: Borjan, Nagaland, India
- Writing career
- Genres: Poems, Lyrics, Novel, Child Literature, Literary Criticism, Travelogue

Karabi Deka Hazarika is an Indian writer from the state of Assam in Northeastern India.

== Awards ==
- Best Women Writer of the Decade (1980–90) "Basanta Bordoloi Award" by Asom Sahitya Sabha in 1991.
- "Best Women Writer" by All Assam Women Writers Association in 2007.
- "Mamoni Raisom Goswami Award, 2024"

== Works ==
Literary criticism:

- Tulanamulak Sahitya Aru Anubad Kala, Banalata, Dibrugarh, 2003
- Tulanamulak Adhyayan, Department of Assamese, Dibrugarh University, 2003

Poems and lyrics

- Ganar Pakhi, Kaustubh Prakashan, Dibrugarh, 2002

Translated books

- Kermelin, Sahitya Akademi, New Delhi,2011
