= Ahom language =

Endangered language of Northeast India

Ahom
- Tai Ahom
- khwám tái ahüm (𑜁𑜪𑜨 𑜄𑜩 𑜒𑜑𑜪𑜨)
- The word "Ahom" in Ahom script
- Native to: India
- Region: Assam
- Ethnicity: Ahom people
- Extinct: 18th or 19th century AD spoken as a learned second language; used in religious and educational purposes
- Revival: Teaching under educational institutions such as Dibrugarh University, Gauhati University and AHSEC
- Language family: Kra–Dai: Tai; Southwestern (Thai); Northwestern; Ahom
- Writing system: Ahom script

Language codes
- ISO 639-3: aho
- Glottolog: ahom1240
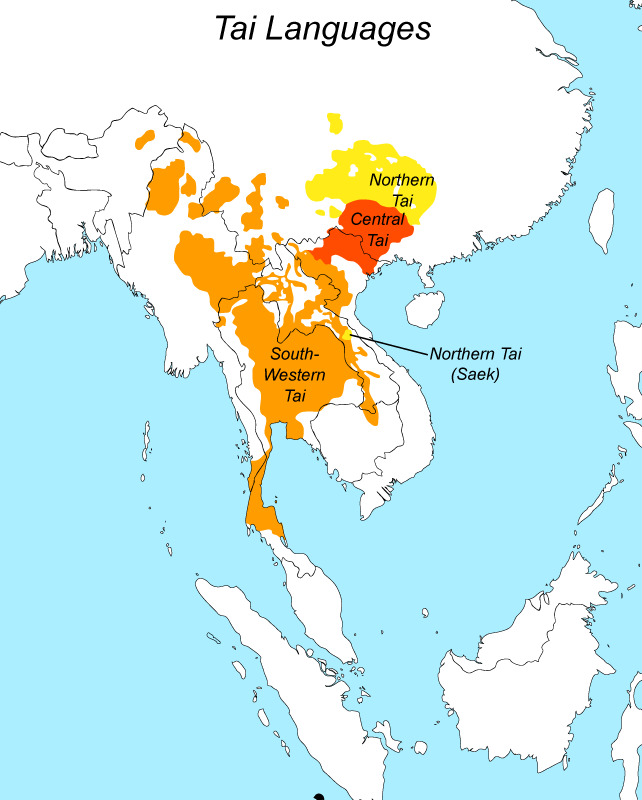
- Tai languages Ahom language belongs to Southwestern Tai in north east India

- As of 2026, Ahom is classified as a critically endangered language by Ethnologue and linguists

Ahom or Tai Ahom (Ahom: 𑜁𑜪𑜨 𑜄𑜩 𑜒𑜑𑜪𑜨 or 𑜁𑜨𑜉𑜫 𑜄𑜩 𑜒𑜑𑜪𑜨; khwám tái ahüm) is a Southwestern Tai language spoken as a second languageby some Ahom people. It is currently undergoing a revival and mainly used in religious and educational purposes. Ahom language was the state language of Ahom kingdom. It was relatively free of both Mon-Khmer and Indo-Aryan influences and has a written tradition dating back to the 13th century.

The Ahom people established the Ahom kingdom and ruled parts of the Brahmaputra river valley in the present day Indian state of Assam between the 13th and the 18th centuries. The language was the court language of the kingdom, until it began to be replaced by the Assamese language in the 17th century. Since the early 18th century, there have been no native speakers of the language, though extensive manuscripts in the language still exist today. The tonal system of the language is entirely lost. The language was only partially known by a small group of traditional priests of the Ahom religion, and it was being used only for ceremonial or ritualistic purposes.

There have been efforts to revive the language in recent times. A reconstructed version is taught in various schools in Assam by AHSEC and universities like Gauhati University and Dibrugarh University.

== Classification ==
Tai Ahom is classified in a Northwestern subgrouping of Southwestern Tai owing to close affinities with Shan, Khamti and, more distantly, Thai. The immediate parent language from which Ahom is descended has been reconstructed as Proto-Tai, a language from 2000 years ago, in the Kra–Dai family (unrelated to Chinese, but possibly related to the Austronesian languages), within the (proposed but debated) subgroup of Kam–Tai, although some say that Tai languages are a discrete family, and are not part of Kra–Dai. Ahom is distinct from but closely related to Aiton, which is still spoken in Assam to this day.

== Description ==
Ahom has characteristics typical of Tai languages, such as:

- Subject Verb Object (SVO) word order
- Tonality
- Monosyllabic roots
- Each syllable is tonal, and begins with a consonant or consonant cluster. A vowel or diphthong follows. A final consonant may be added, but is not necessary.
- Lack of inflection
- Analytic syntax

When speaking and writing Ahom, much is dependent upon context and the audience interpretation. Multiple parts of the sentence can be left out; verb and adjectives will remain, but other parts of speech, especially pronouns, can be dropped. Verbs do not have tenses, and nouns do not have plurals. Time periods can be identified by adverbs, strings of verbs, or auxiliaries placed before the verb. Ahom, like other Tai languages, uses classifiers to identify categories, and repetitions of words to express idiomatic expressions. However, the expressions, classifiers, pronouns, and other sentence particles vary between the Tai languages descended from Proto-Tai, making Tai languages mutually unintelligible.

It has its own script, the Ahom script.

== History ==
The Ahom people and their language originated in Yunnan in south-west China. They migrated from the border between northern Vietnam and the Guangxi province of China, to the Hukawng Valley, along the upper reaches of the Chindwin river, northern Burma. In the 13th century, they crossed the Patkai Range. and settled in the Brahmaputra River valley, in Northeast India. After increasing their power in Upper Assam, the Ahom people extended their power to the south of the river Brahmaputra and east of the river Dikho, which corresponds to the modern day districts of Dibrugarh and Sibsagar, Assam, where the Ahom still reside today. Tai Ahom was the exclusive court language of the Ahom kingdom, where it was used to write state-histories or 'Buranjis'.

In the 16th and 17th centuries, the small Ahom community expanded their rule dramatically toward the west and they successfully saw off challenges from the Mughal Empire and other invaders. The rapid expansion resulted in the Ahom people becoming a small minority in their own kingdom, of which they kept control. During the 17th century, the Assamese language entered the Ahom court and co-existed with the Tai Ahom for some time before finally replacing it. Eventually the Ahom peasants too adopted the Assamese language over the Ahom language for secular purposes, while Ahom was restricted to religious use by Ahom priests. The everyday usage of Ahom language ceased completely by the early 19th century. Although the language is no longer spoken, the exhaustive 1795 Ahom-Assamese lexicon known as the Bar Amra preserves the lexical forms of the language towards the end of the Ahom Kingdom.

The language today is used chiefly for liturgical purposes, and is no longer used in daily life. While the written language (and ritualistic chants) survive in a vast number of written manuscripts, Ahom is therefore usually regarded as a dead language. It retains cultural significance and is used for religious chants and to read literature. This is complicated however by the fact that the phonology with its tone system has been completely lost, because the Ahom script does not mark tone and under-specifies vowel contrasts, which obscures the meaning of words as tones are important to distinguish the meaning of words in tonal languages.

=== Translation efforts ===
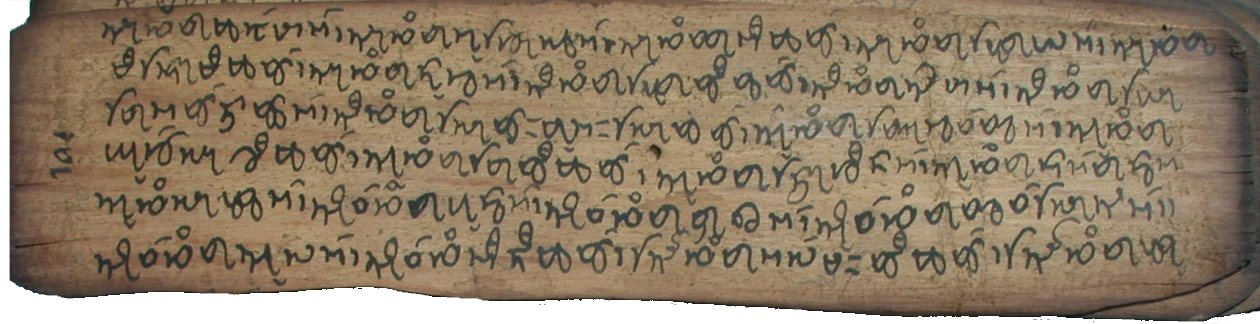
An Ahom manuscript preserved in the Department of Historical and Antiquarian Studies, Pan Bazaar, Guwahati.

Fabricated samples of the Ahom script delayed translation of legitimate Ahom texts. Several publications were created based on the fabricated samples, leading to incorrect grammatical analysis and dictionary resources that acted as a barrier to future researchers. A later translation of Ahom Buranji, a major Ahom script was provided by Golap Chandra Barua, the same man responsible for fabricating samples of translated Ahom script. It was discovered years later, by Professor Prasert na Nagara, that the translation was unreliable. Despite these difficulties, along with the lack of native speakers and specific text, studies in Ahom have prevailed, and certain available scripts have been translated and transliterated, using known words, characters and context.

=== Revitalization efforts ===
In 1954, at a meeting of Ahom people at Patsaku, Sibsagar District, the Tai Historical and Cultural Society of Assam was founded. Since the late 1960s, Ahom culture and traditions have witnessed a revival. In 1981 the Eastern Tai Literary Organization has been founded in Dhemaji, which produced language text books and publications in the Ahom script. Schools in Dibrugarh and Sibsagar districts started offering Tai language classes, teaching a mix of Tai Ahom, Phakey, Khamti and Central Thai. The scholar Terwiel notes that the view of the Ahom language being a dead language is hotly contested by Ahom priests and spokesmen of the revival movement. According to them, the language did not die out because Ahom priests still use the language for religious purposes. Some even claim that the priestly class speaks Ahom as their mother tongue. Upon further investigation, it was determined that the priests could decipher the Ahom script and read the words aloud. However, because they did not know any tones, they did not have any idea of the meaning of the words except for the simplest expressions.

According to Terwiel, there are great differences between the old Ahom language of the manuscripts, which is easily recognizable as a Tai language, and what the revivalists call Ahom, which does not follow the rules of Tai grammar. It has also changed greatly regarding semantics, literally translating Assamese into Tai words, which leads to sentences which do not make sense to any Tai speaker. Terwiel therefore calls this revived language 'pseudo-Ahom'. Nevertheless, this revived language has been used passionately by revitalists and many neologisms have been created. The demand for translation into Tai Ahom led to the creation of the first adequate modern dictionary by Nomal Chandra Gogoi in 1987, titled The Assamese-English-Tai Dictionary. This dictionary allowed a reader to find the translation of 9,000 Assamese words into English and Tai. This dictionary filled in missing gaps of the Ahom vocabulary with Aiton and Khamti words and if those were not available, Lanna and Thai words were used. The result was a hodgepodge of multiple Tai languages, that was only linked to the Ahom language by the Ahom script in which the dictionary entries were written. The scholar Terwiel recommended in 1992 to base neo-Ahom on the grammar and tones of the very closely related Aiton language, which is still spoken in Assam. Summarizing, the revivalists use a language consisting of a mixture of Tai words from multiple Tai languages, overlaid on an Assamese grammatical base.

In 1999, the scholar Morey reported that Ahom priests have resorted to compounding words to differentiate between words that are homophones in the revived language, since Ahom lost its tone system. For example in old Ahom, the word su for tiger and su for shirt would have sounded differently by pronouncing them with a different tone. In revived Ahom, they are now differentiated by compounding them with another word: tu for animal and pha for cloth respectively. Subsequently, tu su and pha su can be differentiated.

An effort has been made to revive the language by following the phonology of existing sister languages, especially Tai-Aiton and Tai-Phake.

The Institute of Tai Studies and Research (ITSAR), is a Tai Ahom language teaching institute in Moran, Sivasagar, Assam, India, established in 2001 and affiliated to Dibrugarh University. It offers a one-year Tai Ahom language diploma course and a three-month certificate course in spoken Tai Ahom. Other initiatives have been taken, such as workshops and language classes. In 2019, the 'Tai Ahom Yuva Chatra Sanmilan, Assam' (TAYCSA), demanded that the Tai Ahom language be included in the school curriculum of the state of Assam. They also demanded the creation of a two-year diploma course in Mahdavdeva University.

An online dictionary containing nearly 5,000 entries (see External links) has been created by analyzing old manuscripts, especially the Bar Amra. A descriptive grammar of Ahom, based on the grammar found in old manuscripts, is being worked on. A sketch has been released, titled “A Sketch of Tai Ahom” by Stephen Morey.

== Phonology ==
=== Consonants ===
The Tai Ahom consonants have been reconstructed as the following, by analyzing old texts:

		Bilabial	Alveolar	Palatal	Velar	Glottal
Plosive	voiced	b	d			
Plosive	tenuis	p	t	c	k	ʔ
Plosive	aspirated	pʰ	tʰ		kʰ	
Nasal		m	n		ŋ	
Fricative			s			h
Approximant			l	j		
Trill			r			

The semi-vowel /w/ is missing from the system, however it is an allophone of /b/ that occurs only in the word final position. Consonants found in the word final position are: /p, t, k, m, n, ŋ, j, b [w]/.

=== Vowels ===
Vowels can occur in syllable medial and final positions only. The following vowel inventory has been reconstructed:

	Front	Central		Back
	Front	short	long	Back
Close	i	ɯ		u
Open-mid	e			o
Open		a	aː	

=== Tones ===
The language had a tone system, but because the Ahom script did not spell out any tones, the tones are now unknown.

== Grammar ==
=== Pronouns ===
The Ahom language has the following pronouns:

Person	Singular	Plural
1st	/kau/ (𑜀𑜧)	/rau/ (𑜍𑜧)
2nd	/maɯ/ (𑜉𑜧)	/su/ (𑜏𑜤)
3rd	/man/ (𑜉𑜃𑜫)	/kʰau/ (𑜁𑜧)

=== Demonstratives ===
Ahom uses the proximal demonstrative nai meaning 'this' and the distal demonstrative nan meaning 'that'.

=== Syntax ===
Tai Ahom mainly used an SVO word order, but an SOV word order has also been attested.

=== Nouns ===
Classifiers are used when forming plurals, counting entities and when specifically referring to one single entity. Some classifiers are: 'kun' (used for persons), 'tu' (used for animals) and 'an' (general). For example 'khai song tu' means two buffalo, where 'khai' means buffalo, 'song' means two and 'tu' is the classifier for animals.

=== Interrogatives ===
The following interrogatives are found:

Phonemic	Meaning
sang	What
naɯ/daɯ	What
rɯ	Why
ki	How many
phaɯ	Who
thaɯ	Where

== Vocabulary ==
=== Numerals ===
Ahom has the following basic numerals:

Cardinal	/lɯŋ/	/sɔ:ŋ/	/sam/	/si:/	/ha/	/ruk/	/cit/	/pit/	/kaw/	/sip/	/kawsip/
Cardinal	𑜎𑜢𑜤𑜂𑜫	𑜏𑜨𑜂𑜫	𑜏𑜪	𑜏𑜣	𑜑𑜡	𑜍𑜤𑜀𑜫	𑜋𑜢𑜄𑜫	𑜆𑜦𑜄𑜫	𑜀𑜟𑜨	𑜏𑜢𑜆𑜫	𑜀𑜟𑜨 𑜏𑜢𑜆𑜫
Cardinal	𑜱	𑜲	𑜳	𑜴	𑜵	𑜶	𑜷	𑜸	𑜹	𑜺	𑜻
Cardinal	1	2	3	4	5	6	7	8	9	10	20
Ordinal	/ʔaj/	/ŋi:/	/sam/	/saj/	/ŋu:/	/luk/	/cit/	/pit/	/kaw/	/sip/	/kawsip/
Ordinal	𑜒𑜊𑜫	𑜂𑜣	𑜏𑜪	𑜏𑜊𑜫	𑜂𑜥	𑜎𑜤𑜀𑜫	𑜋𑜢𑜄𑜫	𑜆𑜦𑜄𑜫	𑜀𑜟𑜨	𑜏𑜢𑜆𑜫	𑜀𑜟𑜨 𑜏𑜢𑜆𑜫
Ordinal	1st	2nd	3rd	4th	5th	6th	7th	8th	9th	10th	20th

0 in Ahom script is "𑜰".

=== Comparative table ===
Below is a comparative table of Ahom and other Tai languages.

English	Proto-Southwestern Tai	Thai	Lao	Northern Thai	Shan	Tai Lü	Standard Zhuang	Ahom:
wind	*lom	/lōm/	/lóm/	/lōm/	/lóm/	/lôm/	/ɣum˧˩/	/lum/
town	*mɯaŋ	/mɯ̄aŋ/	/mɯ́aŋ/	/mɯ̄aŋ/	/mɤ́ŋ/	/mɤ̂ŋ/	/mɯŋ˧/	/mɯŋ/
earth	*ʔdin	/dīn/	/dìn/	/dīn/	/lǐn/	/dín/	/dei˧/	/nin/
fire	*vai/aɯ	/fāj/	/fáj/	/fāj/	/pʰáj/ or /fáj/	/fâj/	/fei˧˩/	/pʰaj/
heart	*čai/aɯ	/hǔa tɕāj/	/hǔa tɕàj/	/hǔa tɕǎj/	/hǒ tsǎɰ/	/hó tɕáj/	/sim/	/caj/
love	*rak	/rák/	/hāk/	/hák/	/hâk/	/hak/	/kʲaj˧˩/	/hak/
water	*naam	/náːm/	/nâːm/	/náːm/	/nâm/	/nà̄m/	/ɣaem˦˨/	/nam/

== See also ==
- Ahom alphabet
- Ahom people
- Ahom Kingdom
- All Tai Ahom Students Union

== Bibliography ==
- Morey, Stephen (2010). Das, Biswajit; Basumatary, Phukan Chandra (eds.). Asamīẏā āru Asamara bhāshā [Assamese and the languages of Assam]. Guwāhāṭī: AANK-Bank. hdl:1839/00-0000-0000-0015-4653-8. ISBN 978-93-80454-30-6. OCLC 757135305. "A sketch of Tai Ahom, as recorded in original manuscripts to appear in Das, Biswajit and Phukan Basumatary (eds)."
- Morey, Stephen (2014), "Ahom and Tangsa: Case studies of language maintenance and loss in North East India", in Cardoso, Hugo C. (ed.), Language Endangerment and Preservation in South Asia, Honolulu: University of Hawai'i Press, pp. 46–77
- Gogoi, Poppy; Morey, Stephen; Pittayaporn, Pittayawat (2020-09-08). "The Tai Ahom Sound System as Reflected by the Texts Recorded in the Bark Manuscripts". Journal of the Southeast Asian Linguistics Society. 13 (2). ISSN 1836-6821.
- Terwiel, B.J. (1996). "Recreating the Past: Revivalism in Northeastern India". Bijdragen tot de Taal-, Land- en Volkenkunde. 152 (2): 275–92. doi:10.1163/22134379-90003014. JSTOR 27864746.
- Terwiel, B. J. (1992). Tai Ahoms and the Stars: Three Ritual Texts to Ward off Danger.
- Marwah, Reena (2020). Reimagining India-thailand Relations: A Multilateral And Bilateral Perspective. World Scientific. ISBN 978-981-12-1205-5.
