= Dibrugarh Hanumanbax Surajmall Kanoi College =

College in Dibrugarh, Assam

Coordinates: 27.480153°N 94.924185°E

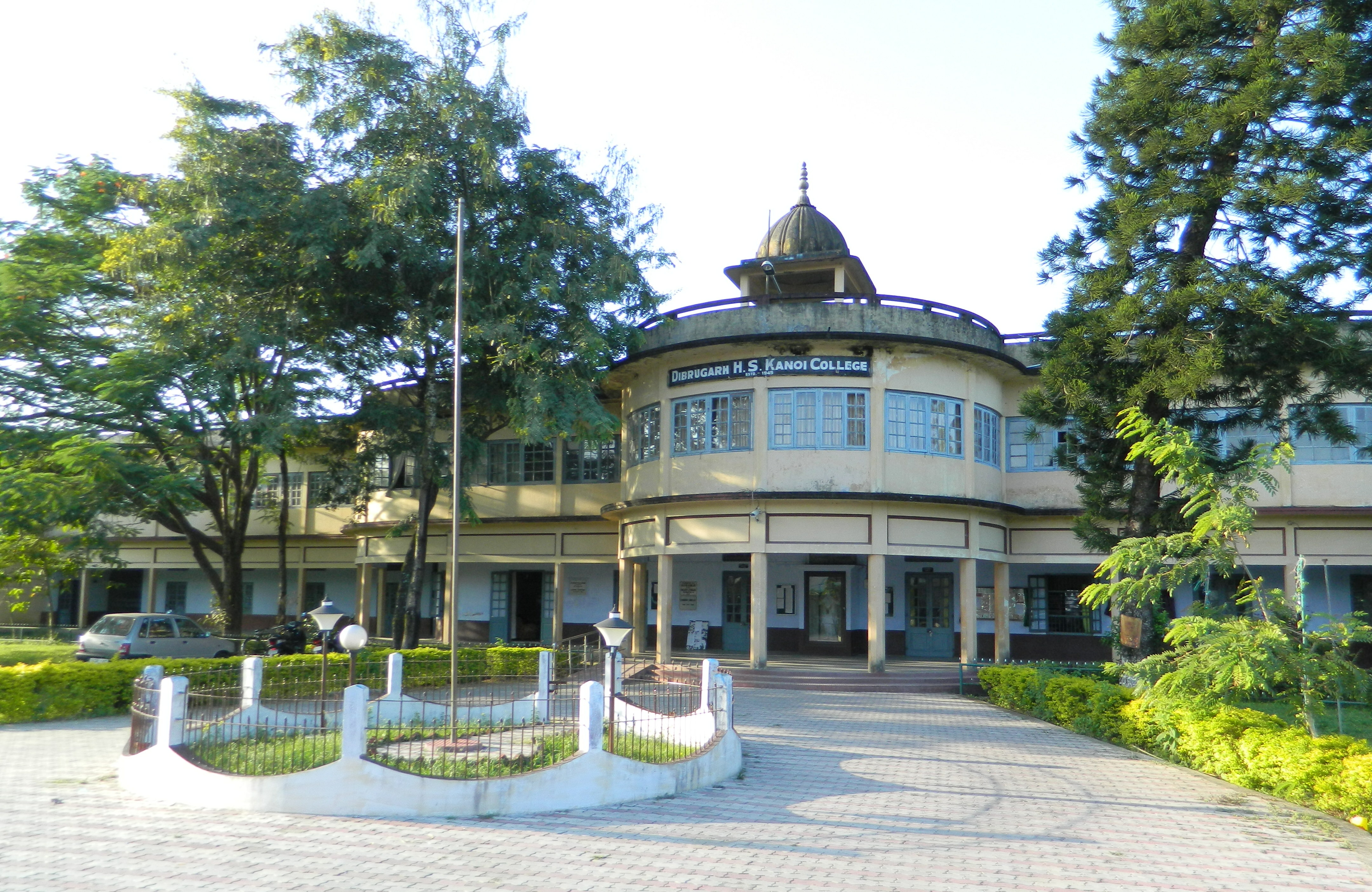
- Other name: DHSK College
- Type: Public
- Established: 15 June 1945; 81 years ago
- Academic affiliations: Dibrugarh University
- Principal: Sashi Kanta Saikia
- Location: Dibrugarh, Assam, India
- Campus: Urban
- Website: www.dhsk.org

Dibrugarh Hanumanbax Surajmall Kanoi College is a government college located in Dibrugarh, Assam, India. It was established on 15 June 1945. The college is affiliated with Dibrugarh University; its Higher Secondary Course is recognised by the Assam Higher Secondary Education Council (AHSEC). It was originally named the Dibrugarh College. In 1957, it was renamed after its donors as Dibrugarh Hanumanbax Surajmall Kanoi College. Sarvapalli Radhakrishnan came from Delhi to inaugurate the college.

Sashi Kanta Saikia is the current Principal of DHSK College from 19 June 2015. For the active involvement of S.K. Saikia, the DHSK College, Dibrugarh had received the Swachchhata Puraskar, 2018 by Dibrugarh District Administration and Dibrugarh Municipal Board. Deputy Director General (DDG) NCC has awarded the DHSK College for their meritorious service to the Nation in 2019.

The college offers a two-year Higher Secondary Course in Science and Arts and a three-year Degree Course in Science and Arts. It was accredited A grade by NAAC in 2023.

== Departments ==
The college maintains the following departments:

- Anthropology
- Assamese
- Bengali
- Botany
- Chemistry
- Computer Science
- Economics
- English
- Geography
- Hindi
- History
- Mathematics
- Philosophy
- Physics
- Political Science
- Sanskrit
- Statistics
- Zoology
- Sociology
