= TIFAC =

Government organization in India

Technology Information Forecasting and Assessment Council

Agency overview
- Formed: February 1988
- Jurisdiction: Government of India
- Headquarters: New Delhi, India
- Parent agency: Department of Science & Technology, Government of India
- Website: https://www.tifac.org.in

TIFAC (Technology Information Forecasting and Assessment Council) is an autonomous organization set up in 1988 by the government of India under the Department of Science & Technology. It functions as a technology policy think tank that conducts technology forecasting, assessment studies, and supports innovation initiatives in areas of national importance. It is also called Government of India's technology think tank.

== History ==
Government of India's Technology Policy Statement (TPS) of 1983 underlined the need for undertaking technology forecasting and assessment studies on a systematic and continuous basis. The formation of TIFAC was approved by the Cabinet in mid 1986 per the recommendation of Technology Policy Implementation Committee (TPIC). The formation of TIFAC was approved by the Union Cabinet in 1986 following recommendations of the Technology Policy Implementation Committee. It was formally registered as a society in February 1988 as an autonomous body under the Department of Science and Technology.

== Objectives ==
TIFAC's objectives were to set directions for future technological development in India in important socio-economic sectors, ensuring timely availability of requisite technologies relevant to the needs of the country on a long-term basis. Minimizing the time gap between the development of new technologies and their utilization and to meaningfully correlate technology development and technology import policies in order to identify priority areas of research for the socio-economic, environmental and security needs of the country.

== Tasks ==
1. Ekaswa:

“Ekaswa” is a Patent Facilitating Centre launched by TIFAC in 1995 facilitating search services for Universities, education institutes, government R&D organizations, and government departments. It provides biographic reports, abstracts and full text patent document on patents granted or published in the United States, Europe, the PCT, and India.

2. Smart healthcare ecosystem:

Smart healthcare ecosystem launched by TIFAC is an attempt to digitize healthcare through the Digital Health Mission. It is expected to provide primary health services to every village of India, through cyber-physical technologies. It is also expected to predict diseases to optimize the use of healthcare resources. Citizens of India living in interiors are expected to get personalized quality treatment. It is said to be the first of its kind healthcare platform in the world.

3. Technology vision document 2035:

TIFAC came out with the ‘Technology Vision Document 2035’ on 3 January 2016 with an aim to Ensure Security, Enhance Prosperity, and Enhance Identity of every Indian. The document identifies twelve prerogatives for every Indian. These are: Clean air and potable water; Food and nutritional security; Universal healthcare and public hygiene; 24x7 energy; Decent habitat; Quality education, livelihood and creative opportunities. Collective Prerogatives are: Safe and speedy mobility; Public safety and national security; Cultural diversity and vibrancy; Transparent and effective governance; Disaster and climate resilience and Eco-friendly conservation of natural resources.

The document also foresees the technological requirements of Indians of 2035 for which it identifies twelve focus areas: Education; Medical Sciences & Healthcare; Food and Agriculture; Water; Energy; Environment; Habitat; Transportation; Infrastructure; Manufacturing; Materials and Information and Communication Technology.
