= Dibrugarh University =

University in Assam, India

- Motto: Perform Your Duties, For Action is Superior to Inaction
- Type: Public state university
- Established: 1965; 61 years ago
- Accreditation: NAAC
- Academic affiliations: UGC; AIU; ACU; AICTE; NCTE; NIRF; PCI; ISO 9000; ISO 50001
- Chancellor: Governor of Assam
- Vice-Chancellor: Jiten Hazarika
- Location: Rajabheta, Dibrugarh, Assam, 786004, India; 27.450°N 94.895°E
- Campus: total over 500 acres (2.0 km^{2}); Rural
- Acronym: DU
- Website: dibru.ac.in

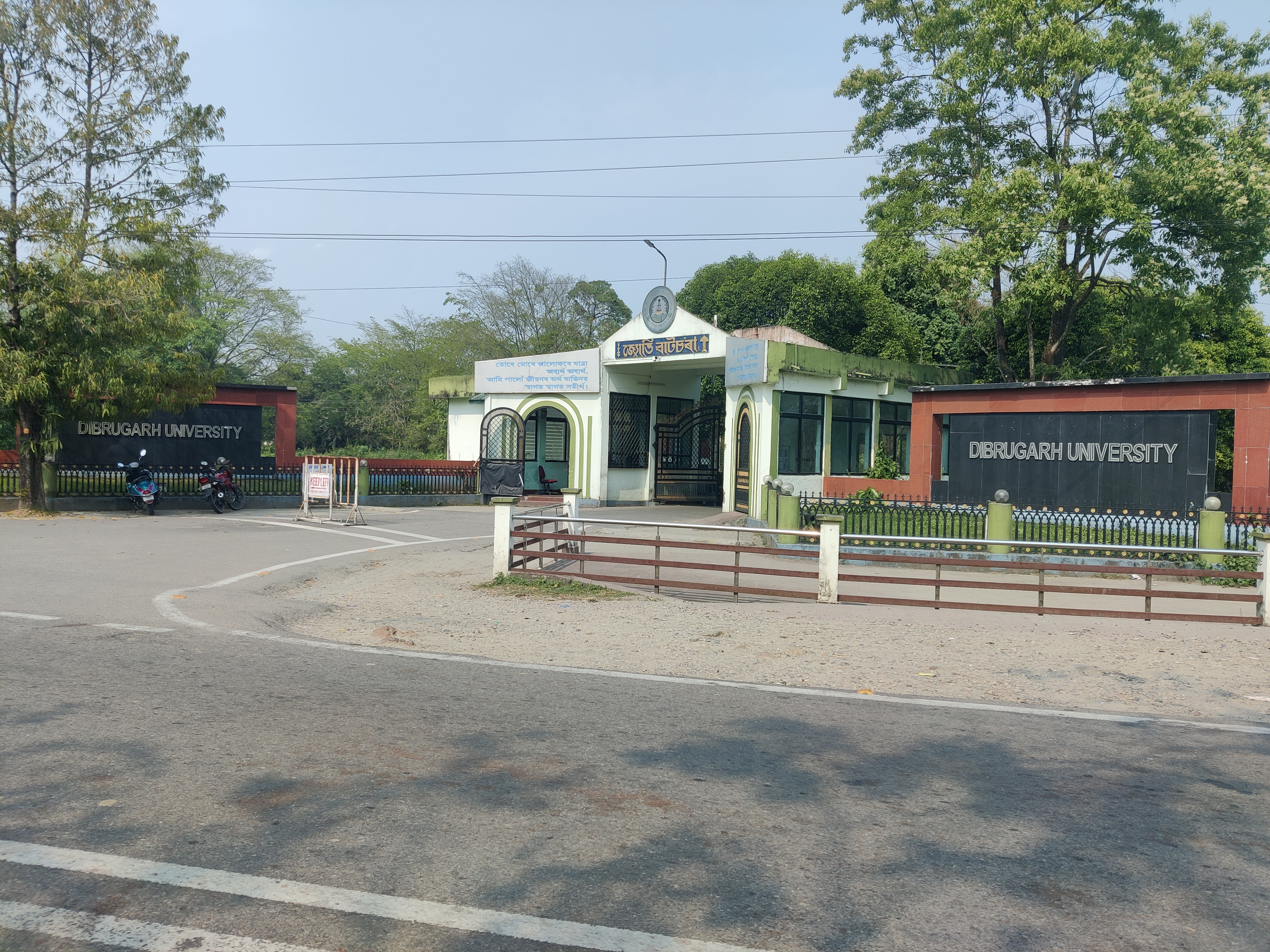
Dibrugarh University entrance

Dibrugarh University is a collegiate public state university in the Indian state of Assam. It is the second oldest University in North East India and Assam, and is a member of the Association of Commonwealth Universities and Association of Indian Universities. It is located at Dibrugarh, Assam, India. It was set up on 1 July 1965 under the provisions of the Dibrugarh University Act, 1965 enacted by the Assam Legislative Assembly. Bhoj Raj Seth, a mathematician of the Indian Institute of Technology, Kharagpur, was appointed as its first Vice-Chancellor at the initiative of the then Education Minister of Assam, Dev Kant Barooah.

The university comprises 17 Department, Dibrugarh University Institute of Engineering and Technology, 16 centre of studies within the 7 distinct Faculty of Studies via an ordinance passed on 17 July 2019 vide Resolution No. 44 and an exclusive Centre for Distance and Online Education. As of September 2022, the university also hosts 177 affiliated colleges and institutes that spread over ten districts of Assam. The university is recognised by University Grants Commission.

== Location ==
The Dibrugarh University Campus is located at Rajabheta, Dibrugarh city and is spread over an area of 500 acres. The NH15 (old NH37) bisects the main campus from the other, the latter primarily comprising teacher's and officer's residence. The university is well connected by rail, road and air. The nearest airport is Dibrugarh Airport (DIB) which is approximately 19 km away, the district bus terminal is 5.5 km away and most often travellers can avail pick-up from the university gate itself where waiting facility has been made by the university administration. The city houses two railway stations Dibrugarh Town railway station (DBRT) which is 4.7 km away and Dibrugarh railway station (DBRG) which is 6.5 km from the university. The university is well connected by roads with Bogibeel Bridge connecting the districts in the northern banks of the river Brahmaputra facilitating student mobility for their higher studies.

The region is well known for its vast mineral resources (including oil, natural gas and coal). Government companies Oil India Limited, Oil and Natural Gas Corporation Limited, Brahmaputra Valley Fertilizer Corporation Limited, Digboi Refinery (IOCL),Brahmaputra Cracker and Polymer Limited, North Eastern Coalfields (CIL) Gas Authority of India Limited, Assam Gas Company Limited operate within 100 km radius of the university encouraging scholars for studies of Earth Sciences, and Engineering especially on Petroleum.

The region is also well known for its flora and fauna. Apart from presence of Dibru-Saikhowa National Park, well known for its Feral horses, Dehing Patkai National Park, Jokai Reserve Forest, the region is fertile for agriculture with rice, sugarcane and pulses being the major crops facilitated by the presence of Brahmaputra. The entire district is full of Tea Plantations, initially, tea was homegrown by Singpho Tribe, later commercially initiated by Maniram Dewan in the region. In 2007, the university started its Centre for Tea and Agro Studies which attracts students aspiring to join the Tea Industry.

The diverse tribes with their distinct dialects, customs, traditions and culture make this area attractive to students of anthropology and sociology, art and culture.

== Accreditation ==
Dibrugarh university is accredited by the National Assessment and Accreditation Council, with a 'B++' Grade in 2023. which is valid for a period of five years. The UG programme of the university Bachelor of Physical Education is recognized by National Council for Teacher Education. Moreover, all the courses conducted by the Department of Pharmaceutical Sciences are approved by the PCI and the AICTE. All the UG engineering programmes run by the university in Dibrugarh University Institute of Engineering and Technology are also approved by the AICTE.

Dibrugarh University is UGC recognized and also a member of the Association of Indian Universities (AIU). Moreover, it is also a member of the Association of Commonwealth Universities (ACU).

== Faculty of Humanities and Law ==
=== Department of Assamese ===
The Department of Assamese was established in 1967. The department offers Ph.D., M.Phil. and two year Post Graduate Programmes. The department has designed the whole course structure by incorporating the contemporary trend and tendencies of the global literary and linguistic scenario. The department also owns a Cultural Museum containing various art and artifices from different tribes and communities of the whole North-Eastern region.

=== Department of English ===
The Department of English was established in 1967, with specific purpose of imparting post-graduate studies in English literature leading to M.A., M.Phil., Ph.D. degrees and to chart the courses at the Major and General Degree level of the affiliated colleges. The Department's studies in English literature are not confined to the literature of the British Tales written in the English language. It includes select European, American, African and Indian Writing in English.

=== Centre for Studies in Language ===
The Centre for Studies in Language offers M.A., Diploma, and Certificate Programme. The Centre for Studies in Language has collaborative programme with Kasetsart University, Bangkok Thailand. The Institute of Tai Studies and Research, Moranhat affiliated to the university is also conducting two courses viz.

- One year Post Graduate Diploma in Tai Language course
- Three Months Certificate Course in Spoken Tai.

=== Centre for Studies in Philosophy ===
Centre for Studies in Philosophy was started in July 2009. Since then it has expanded its activities to provide philosophical foundations to acquaint students with various fields of Philosophy such as Epistemology (Indian & Western), Metaphysics (Indian & Western), Ethics, Logic, Philosophy of Religion, Social & Political Philosophy etc. The Centre initially started offering M.A. programmes later started offering Ph.D. programme since 2010.

=== Centre for Juridical Studies ===
The Centre for Juridical Studies was established in the year 2006 offering 5 Year Integrated BA.LL.B. Degree. It also offers Audit Course on Intellectual Property Rights for students pursuing a regular degree in Dibrugarh University.

=== Dr. Bhupen Hazarika Centre for studies in Performing Arts ===
Dr. Bhupen Hazarika Centre for Studies in Performing Arts (earlier known as Centre for Performing Arts) was established in 2008 to impart quality education and research, both theoretically and practically in the field of Performing Arts. Besides offering graduate and post-graduate programmes in Theatre Art and Vocal Music, it is the only centre in the entire north-east offering graduate and post-graduate programme in ‘Sattriya Dance’ (500 years old traditional dance form recognized by the Sangeet Natak Academi of India as a classical dance form).

== Faculty of Social Sciences ==
=== Department of History ===
The Department of History was established in 1967. The department offers Ph.D., M.Phil. and Two-year Post-Graduate programmes. It has also introduced compulsory papers such as Gender History, Environmental History etc. to make the students acquainted with the latest areas of research. The major thrust areas of the department are political, social, cultural, and religious history, history of environment, ethnicity, and gender history.

=== Department of Political Science ===
The Department of Political Science was established in 1967. The department offers Ph.D., and Two-year Post-Graduate programmes. The thrust areas of the department includes Democracy, Human Rights and Peace Studies, Gender Studies, Development Studies, Social Movement and Strategic Studies specific to the North Eastern Region and the Southeast Asia.

=== Department of Sociology ===
The Department of Sociology was established in 1967. It is the first department of sociology in this region. The department offers Ph.D., M.Phil. and Two-year Post-Graduate programmes. Department of Sociology has also played a key role in the establishment of The Centre for Social Work Studies in the 2010–11 academic session for teaching Post Graduate programmes in Master of Social Work (MSW). The department has been publishing “The North Eastern Research Bulletin”, an ISSN Referred Journal since 1970.

=== Department of Economics ===
The Department of Economics was established in 1967. The department offers Post Doc., Ph.D., M.Phil. and Two-year Post-Graduate programmes. The teachers of the department are reputed for conducting studies and consultancy projects for various bodies including the Finance Commission, government departments, PSUs and other institutes. The department has been annually publishing "Assam Economic Journal", a peer-reviewed research journal.

=== Centre for Social Work Studies ===
The Centre for Social Work Studies(CSWS) was established in 2010. The Centre is offers Masters's Programme in Social Work with two specializations, viz.

- Community Development
- Human Resource Management

=== Centre for Studies in Journalism and Mass Communication ===
The Centre for Studies in Journalism and Mass Communication was established in 2008. The Centre offers two master programmes

- M.A in Mass Communication (MAMC) course with a provision for specialization in print, electronic, new media and public affairs and a mandatory internship programme
- M.A. in Communication for Sanitation, Hygiene and Health (CSH&H) in collaboration with UNICEF.

=== Centre for Women's Studies ===
The Centre for Women's Studies is UGC approved Women's Studies Centres in the country and second such centre in the north-east region of India. It was established as a centre in 1998 with a UGC grant under the IX Plan and received the approval of UGC in November 2004. The centre currently offers M.A. programme in women's studies. The centre has also facilitated the setting up of 43 women's studies cells in various colleges affiliated to the university. The centre has collaborated with Ministry of Women and Child Development, Govt. of India, National Commission for Women, State Commission for Women, Indian Association for Women's Studies, UNICEF, and various NGOs for various endeavours of the centre.

== Faculty of Education ==
=== Department of Education ===
The Department of Education was established on 20 September 1965. It started with a teacher-training course called Bachelor of Teaching (B.T). Till 1968 the department was known as the ‘Institute of Education’ and from 1968 it came to be known as the Department of Education with the same B.T. course. In 1969, the department was shifted to its permanent Rajabheta Campus. The B.T. course was renamed as the B.Ed. course with effect from 1981 to 1982 session. In 1987, the Science stream in the B.Ed. course was introduced, heralding a new beginning for the Department. The department was raised to the status of "College of Teacher Education" (CTE) from 1 September 1989.

The department introduced the M.Ed. Course from 1 September 1989 and four years later the liberal academic course of M.A. in Education was also initiated from the session 1992-93. The Department of Education has been upgraded to a full-fledged Post–Graduate Department at present. Thus the Department of Education conducts three postgraduate programmes in education, viz. B.Ed., M.Ed. and M.A. in education, besides the Ph.D. course work.

=== Centre for Studies in Physical Education and Sports ===
The Centre for Studies in Physical Education and Sports was introduced in 2009-2010, It was aimed at imparting the knowledge of games and sports and physical well-being to produce competent professionals, expert and executors in implementation of current methods and techniques of physical education and sports to the society. The centre offers Bachelor of Physical Education which is NCTE recognized.

=== Centre for Studies in Applied Psychology ===
The Centre for Studies in Applied Psychology (CSAP), DU, in collaboration with Assam Medical College & Hospital, Dibrugarh was established in 2009. The centre offers M.A. in Applied Psychology and PG Diploma in Counseling Psychology.

=== Centre for Library and Information Sciences ===
The Centre for Library and Information Science Studies (CLISS) was established in 2005. The Centre offers Undergraduate programmes with a Bachelor in Library and Information Science (BLibISc) and a Postgraduate programme with a Master of Library and Information Science (MLibISc)

== Faculty of Commerce and Management Sciences ==
=== Department of Commerce ===
The Department of Commerce was established in 1978. The department offers Masters in commerce programme in Finance, and Marketing. It also offers M.Phil. and Ph.D. programmes. The department has the distinction of being recognized as a UGC Refresher Course Center in Commerce. The department publishes its annual research journal "VANIJYA" since the year 1989.

=== Centre for Management Studies ===
The Centre for management Studies (CMS) was established in 2002. The centre offers Bachelor of Business Administration, Master of Business Administration, Masters in Travel and Tourism Management, and Ph.D. programmes. The Centre also has a consultancy cell called Parivartan. The faculty members of CMS look after the whole affairs of this cell.

=== Centre for Tea and Agro Studies ===
The Centre for Tea and Agro Studies was established in 2007. The centre has active collaboration with Tea Research Association (TRA), Tea Board of India and other tea associations of the country. The centre has set up a start-up unit on bio-pesticide and bio-fertilizer by an alumnus of the university and set up a mini-factory for the production of green tea. The centre offers a postgraduate diploma in tea technology and plantation management (PGDTTPM).

== Faculty of Science and Engineering ==
=== Department of Physics ===
The Department of Physics was established in 1967. The department offers Ph.D., M.Phil., two-year postgraduate programmes, and Integrated M.Sc. The department has 7 research groups, viz.

- Atmospheric Science Research Group
- Theoretical Condensed Matter Group
- Electronics Group
- Astrophysics, Cosmology and HEP Group
- Material Science Group
- Space Physics Research Group
- Spectroscopy Laboratory

=== Department of Chemistry ===
The Department of Chemistry was established in 1968. The department offers three courses: M.Sc., M.Phil. and Ph.D. in Chemistry. The major thrust areas of research include Catalysis, Organic synthesis, Natural Products Chemistry, Green Chemistry, Polymer Chemistry, Co-ordination Chemistry, Materials Chemistry, Nanomaterials, Theoretical and Computational Chemistry, Biofertilizers, Agricultural delivery, Crystallography, Metal Organic Framework, Computational Biophysics, etc. The department is involved in collaborative research with many institutes of national importance like CSIR-CSMCRI, Bhavnagar, CSIR-CDRI, Lucknow, Tezpur University, CSIR-NEIST, Jorhat, etc.

=== Department of Mathematics ===
The Department of Mathematics was established in 1967. The department offers M.A. /M.Sc., M.Phil. and Ph. D. The department also publishing Mathematical Forum, annual journal since 1978.The journal is also indexed in UGC-CARE.

=== Department of Statistics ===
The Department of Statistics was established in 1967. The thrust areas of research include Discrete Probability Distribution, Medical Statistics, Statistical Inference, Simulation, Quality Control, Demography, Econometrics, and Statistical Ecology. The department offers M.A., M.Sc., M.Phil., Ph.D., and Post Graduate Diploma in Statistical Techniques and Computation (PGDSTC). The department has its own peer-reviewed research journal Assam Statistical Review (ASR) since 1987.

=== Department of Anthropology ===
The Department of Anthropology was established in 1966. The department offers M.A., M.Sc., Ph.D. and Post-Doctoral in Anthropology.

=== Department of Pharmaceutical Sciences ===
The Department of Pharmaceutical Sciences was established in 1983. It is the first establishment offering B.Pharm. in the entire North-East, India. The department offers Bachelor of Pharmacy, Master of Pharmacy with specializations in Pharmaceutics, Pharmaceutical Chemistry, Pharmacology and Pharmacognosy, B.Pharm. (Practice) and Ph.D. All the courses conducted in this Department are approved by the Pharmacy Council of India and AICTE. The department also publishes a bi-annual Research Journal named Current Trends in Pharmaceutical Research. The department secured NIRF ranking of 33 (Pharmacy Category) in 2023.

=== Dibrugarh University Institute of Engineering & Technology ===
Dibrugarh University Institute of Engineering & Technology (DUIET) was established in 2009 with approval from the Government of Assam. The Institute offers four-year B.Tech. Programme in the branches of Computer Science & Engineering, Electronics & Communication Engineering, Mechanical Engineering and Petroleum Engineering with an approved intake of 60 in each branch. All the programmes are approved by the AICTE. The institute houses four departments for each branch of Engineering along with the Department of Basic Science and Humanities and Centre for Indian Knowledge System (CIKS).

- Department of Basic Science and Humanities

The department offers engineers of DUIET with the basic knowledge of Physics, Chemistry, Mathematics and English (communication skills) and inquiry for research

- Department of Computer Science and Engineering

The department offers a B.Tech. in Computer Science and Engineering with an intake capacity of 60 in 1st Semester and 12 in 3rd Semester through Lateral Entry.

- Department of Electronics and Communication Engineering

The department offers B.Tech. in Electronics & Communication Engineering and Ph.D. program.

- Department of Mechanical Engineering

The department offers B.Tech. in Mechanical Engineering. The department also offered M.Tech. Programme in Fluid, Thermal & Energy in the year 2013. Both the B.Tech. and M.Tech. programmes are approved by AICTE.

- Department of Petroleum Engineering

The department offers B.Tech. programme in Petroleum Engineering with an intake capacity of 60 in 1st Semester and 12 in 3rd Semester through Lateral Entry. The students can also participate in professional student chapters for the dissemination of technical knowledge viz. SPE Dibrugarh University Student Chapter and FIPI- Dibrugarh University Student Chapter.

- Centre for Indian Knowledge System (CIKS)

The Centre envisages itself as a multidisciplinary research centre of excellence dedicated to advancing philosophic and scientific knowledge of Indian Knowledge Systems.

=== Centre for Computer Science and Applications ===
The Centre for Computer Science and Applications (formerly known as Centre for Computer Studies) was established in 1976 as a computer centre to create computer awareness among the teachers, research scholars and employees of the university. The Centre offers Master of Computer Application, Bachelor of Computer Application, Post Graduate Diploma in Computer Application (PGDCA) and Ph.D. in Computer Science. Apart from academics, the centre is responsible for software development and computerization of the Centre for Distance and Online Education-Dibrugarh University, the Examination Branch of the university, Counselling and Admission procedure of students of the university, Election of Dibrugarh University Post Graduate Students' Union (DUPGSU), etc.

=== Centre for Atmospheric Studies ===
The Centre for Atmospheric Studies (CAS) was established in 2006. The centre offers Ph.D. and Post-Doctoral Research in Earth's Atmosphere and Climate Science, Aeronomy, Ionospheric Instrumentation. The centre has robust observational program of aerosol and trace gas with support from ISRO, DST and UGC. The centre operates a chain of Global Navigation Satellite System receivers in NE India and the only Ionosonde since 2010 in the whole of east and northeast India. The centre has developed an Indigenous Ionosonde in collaboration with Society for Applied Microwave Electronics Engineering and Research (SAMEER), IIT Bombay with financial support from DeiTY, Govt of India.

== Faculty of Biological Sciences ==
=== Department of Life Sciences ===
The Department of Life sciences was established in 1977. It offers postgraduate programmes like M.Sc. and Ph.D. in life sciences. The department maintains a digital database of ethno-medicinal plants found in this region with financial support from UGC. The department developed 4.63 hectares of Botanical garden for ex-situ conservation of plant species inside the university campus.

=== Centre for Studies in Biotechnology and Bioinformatics ===
The Centre for Studies in Biotechnology was established in 2005 and the Centre for Bioinformatics Studies was established in 2006. Later, both these centres are amalgamated in 2016 to form the Centre for Studies in Biotechnology and Bioinformatics. The centre offers Postgraduate programmes leading to MSc. and PhD in Biotechnology and Bioinformatics.

== Faculty of Earth Sciences and Energy ==
=== Department of Applied Geology ===
The Department of Applied Geology was established in 1970. The department offers M.Sc. in Applied Geology, M.Sc. Tech in Applied Geophysics and Ph.D. Programmes. Oil India Limited has instituted K. D. Malaviya (KDM) Chair in 1993 with an annual grant for pursuing research related to Petroleum Geo-sciences.

=== Department of Petroleum Technology ===
The Department of Petroleum Technology was established in 1969. The department was given recognition by TIFAC, DST, Government of India, as one of the Centres of Relevance and Excellence (TIFAC-CORE) in India, under Mission REACH in 2000. The department offers M.Tech. programme in Petroleum Technology (Petroleum Exploration & Production), Ph.D. programme, and One Year Diploma programme in Oil Well Drilling Technology.

=== Centre for Studies in Geography ===
The Centre for Studies in Geography was established in 2008. It was dedicated to the comprehensive study of the Earth's landscapes, environments, and spatial relationships. The centre offers M.A., M.Sc. and Ph.D. programmes in geography.

== Distance education ==
=== Centre for Distance and Online Education ===
The Centre for Distance and Online Education (CDOE), Dibrugarh University previously known as the Directorate of Open and Distance Learning (DODL), Dibrugarh University was established in 2001 with a vision to reach the unreached. Considering the necessity of enabling the youths who are either employed or self-employed and who are unable to pursue higher education due to economic or other reasons, the university has set the vision of taking Higher Education to the doorsteps of the learners.

The Centre started with postgraduate programmes in Assamese, commerce, economics, mathematics, political science, education and sociology. Later, the MA in English Programme was introduced in the academic session 2008-09. Moreover, Bachelor in Computer Application (BCA) and postgraduate diploma in computer application (PGDCA) have been launched from the academic session 2010-11. In 2011-2012 the centre introduced the Bachelor of Arts (B.A.) programme in an annual system through distance mode.

== Library facility ==
The Lakshminath Bezbarua Library is the Central Library of the university established in April 1967 with merely 997 books. Over the years, the library has posed itself as the pivotal information and knowledge hub that offers wide-ranging user services including access to books, journals, theses, dissertations, reports, and surveys encompassing varied subjects and disciplines of human endeavor. As of August 2016, the Library collections are made up of over 2,25,000 print and non-print resources and offer online access to more than 10,000 e-journals and over 7000 e-books along with many other collections.

=== Books ===
The total collection of books (on shelves) in the Library is over 1,94,340. The collection includes books from the various branches of knowledge such as Engineering, Social Sciences, Natural Sciences and Humanities.

=== Journals, serials, and periodicals collection ===
The LNB Library currently holds:

- 143 current periodicals (scholarly journals and popular magazines)
- 22,685 bound journals
- 21 regional and national newspapers
- 10,000+ e- journals

=== Government publications ===
The LNB Library possesses some Government Publications which include

- Census Data
- UN Journals
- Commonwealth reports
- NSS reports
- Govt. of Assam's Statistical Reports

=== Special collections ===
- Gandhian Collection of about 150 volumes.
- Nobel Laureate Collection of about 209 volumes.
- North East Collection which is an extraordinary and rare collection of over 2000 books.
- Newspaper Collection of approx. 100 newspaper-bound volumes of important national and regional newspapers.
- Reference Collection of 4300 reference books, current and retrospective.
- CD/DVD Collection of about 750 CD/DVDs of various disciplines.
- Cartograph Collection of about 53 maps of various regions of the earth.
- A new Children's Book Collection is also proposed.

=== Theses and dissertation collection ===
The library has more than 5000 theses and dissertations of various branches of knowledge such as social sciences and humanities, and natural sciences, including medical science and engineering.

=== Departmental libraries ===
Apart from the LNB library, individual departments have their libraries housed within their respective buildings. DUIET has its library facility within the Sir M. Visvesvaraya Bhavan housing books for the budding engineers.

== Facilities and infrastructure ==
=== Auditoriums ===
- Rangghar is the main auditorium of the University campus. The auditorium is equipped with sophisticated light and acoustic systems. Cultural programmes and other events of the University are organized regularly.
- Bishnurabha Rangamancha is a spacious and magnificent open auditorium.
- DUIET Open Gallery is a magnificent open air semi-circular amphitheatre.

=== Conference halls ===
The university has many conference halls to host seminars, symposia and workshops. Few major conference halls are viz.

- Indira Miri Conference Hall
- Dr. Bhojraj Seth Conference Hall
- Chintan
- Vikshan
- Aniruddha Dev Bhavan Conference Hall
- Pushpalata Das Conference Hall

=== Hostel facilities ===
The university provides hostel accommodation to the deserving meritorious students. There are 18 hostels with limited seats that are provided strictly on merit and first-come, first-served basis.

Hostel	Capacity
International Hostel	
Padmanath Gohain Baruah Chatra Nivas	216
Maffijuddin Ahmed Hazarika Chatra Nivas	144
Miles Bronson Chatra Nivas	148
Dr. Leela Gogoi Memorial Gobeshak Chatra Nivas	44
Guruprasad Das Chatra Nivas	170
Lummer Dai Chatra Nivas	190
Maniram Dewan Chatra Niwas	60
Joymati Chatri Nivas	144
Nalinibala Devi Chatri Nivas	134
Aideo Handique Chatri Nivas	166
New Aideo Handique Chatri Nivas	164
Pushpalata Das Chatri Nivas	148
Padmakumari Gohain Women's Hostel	148
Swaranalata Baruah Chatri Nivash	120
Mamoni Raisom Goswami Chatri Nivash	126
Amal Prabha Das Chatri Nivash	350
New Girls’ Hostel	Under Maintenance

=== Students’ day activity centre ===
The Students’ Activity Centre was inaugurated on 18 April 2012 by Prof. Kandarpa Kumar Deka, then Vice-Chancellor of Dibrugarh University. It is situated in front of the Play Ground No. 1. Various students’ activities like Drama rehearsal, singing-dancing practices, photo exhibitions, book-fairs are held here.

=== Health care centre ===
The Dibrugarh University Health Centre was first established in 1971 with a full-time pharmacist and visiting physicians of the Assam Medical College and Hospital. A full-time Medical Officer was appointed in 1973. It houses 20 beds, a minor operation theatre with an attached sterilizing room and a Laboratory.

=== Sports facilities ===
Facility	Number	Details
Playground	2	Cricket, Football, Track & Field: Old Playground; DU New Playground
Indoor Stadium	1	Bhimbor Deori Indoor Stadium
Gymnasium	1	DU Gymnasium Hall
Multi Station Gym	2	Housed inside DU Gymnasium Hall
Pavilion	1	Old Playground Pavilion
Badminton Court	2	Housed inside Bhimbor Deori Indoor Stadium
Table Tennis	3	Housed inside Bhimbor Deori Indoor Stadium
Basket Ball Court	2	Basket Ball Court with lighting system
Volley Ball Court	2	Volley Ball with lighting system
Tennis court	1	Lawn Tennis court with night playing facility
Kho-Kho ground	1	
Handball Court	1	

=== Hitendranath Barua Science and Culture Park ===
The park covers 38 bighas (approx..) of verdant landscape with simulated structures of the Rangghar, sculptures of a life-size elephant, a rhino, and combative bulls, including an artificial waterfall atop a hill. Since it is an education-cum-recreational park, there are representations of ethnic dance forms of different ethnic communities of North East India in the peripheral walls of the park. Iron figurines representing stories from Lakhmi Nath Bezbarua's "Burhi Aair Xadhu"(বুঢ়ী আইৰ সাধু) as well as simulated forms of a village hut built of clay and wattles along with the thresher (ঢেকী), silk spinning yarn etc. It also houses an open stage where theatrical and music performances are conducted.

=== Vishranta-The Guest House ===
The Vishranta is located against a picturesque backdrop of lush green tea gardens. The Guest House has two wings viz.

- New Wing consists of 13 Standard Rooms, 16 Deluxe Rooms and 6 Suites
- Old Wing consists of 6 Regular Rooms and 5 Budget Rooms.

=== Canteens and shopping complex ===
- Jo:Sag
- DU Haat is a market complex of the university that houses multiple shops of stationery, grocery, fast food, fresh juice, tailors, barber shops, etc.
- Juti Canteen
- Library Canteen
- DUIET Cafeteria

=== Botanical Garden ===
The university has allocated 4.63 hectares to the Department of Life Sciences in which a Botanical garden for ex-situ conservation of plant species was established in 2001. The North Eastern Region of India is very rich in orchids, medicinal and rare fruit plants. The university has been spearheading the preservation and propagation of threatened endemic species of this region through this Botanical Garden.

=== Staff quarter ===
There are a total of 181 staff quarters in Dibrugarh University, of which 88 are allotted to the Teachers, 18 are allotted to the Officers, 26 are allotted to the 3rd Grade employees and 49 are allotted to the 4th Grade employees.

=== Day Care Centre (Angkuran) ===
The Day Care Centre was established on 2 September 2008. The centre was established to help working parents employed in the university to cope with the problem of providing quality child care while they are away at work. The Centre is well equipped with all the necessary paraphernalia required for quality child care The Day Care Centre has started providing nursery and pre-nursery courses for the kids. The Day Care Centre is also helping the working parents and mothers of the fringe area who are not members of the university community.

=== Radio Gyanmalinee ===
Radio Gyanmalinee is an FM based community radio station of the university. This radio service has been regularly broadcasting educational as well as important contents from different fields since 7 February 2019 through 90.8 FM.

The Radio Gyanmalinee studio is located on the first floor of the Centre of Open and Distance Learning on campus. A team of broadcasters handles daily production and transmission activities.

== Ranking ==
University rankings

General – India
- NIRF (Overall) (2023): 151–200
- NIRF (Universities) (2023): 101-150

Pharmacy – India
- NIRF (2024): 43

Dibrugarh University was ranked in the 151–200th band overall in India by the NIRF in 2023. The university was placed in 101-150th band among universities in 2023. The university also ranked 43rd in the pharmacy ranking in 2024.

== Affiliated colleges ==
As of September 2022, the university has 177 affiliated colleges spread over ten districts viz. Tinsukia, Dibrugarh, Sivasagar, Charaideo, Jorhat, Majuli, Golaghat, Lakhimpur, Dhemaji, and Karbi Anglong.

Districts	No. of Affiliated Colleges
Tinsukia	18, including Digboi College, Digboi Mahila Mahavidyalaya, DoomDooma College, Janata Mahavidyalaya, Makum College, Margherita College, Sadiya College, Tinsukia College, Women's College, Tinsukia
Dibrugarh	27, including Dakha Devi Rasiwasia College, Dibrugarh Hanumanbax Surajmall Kanoi College, Dibrugarh Hanumanbux Surajmal Kanoi Commerce College, Dibru College, Duliajan College, Khowang College, Naharkatiya College, Namrup College, Nandalal Borgohain City College, Pithubar Girls' Degree College, Salt Brook Academy, S.I.P.E. Law College, Tengakhat College, Tingkhong College
Golaghat	19, including Dergaon Kamal Dowerah College, Debraj Roy College, Golaghat Commerce College, Hemo Prova Borbora Girls' College
Sivasagar	15, including Amguri College, Gargaon College, Hem Chandra Dev Goswami College, Jhanji Hemnath Sarma College, Sibsagar College, Sibsagar Girls' College, Swahid Maniram Dewan College, Swahid Peoli Phukan College
Charaideo	7, including Institute of Tai Studies and Research, Moran College, Moran Mahila Mahavidyalaya, Sapekhati College, Sonari College
Jorhat	24, including Bahona College, Borholla College, Chandra Kamal Bezbaruah College, CKB Commerce College (Chandra Kamal Bezbaruah Commerce College), Devicharan Barua Girls' College, Dr. Nobin Bordoloi College, Jagannath Barooah College, Jorhat College (Amalgamated), Jorhat Kendriya Mahavidyalaya, Jorhat Law College, Kakojan College, Mariani College, Nanda Nath Saikia College
Majuli	6, including Jengraimukh College, Majuli College, Pub Majuli College, Rangachahi College
Lakhimpur	27, including Brahmaputra Degree College, Dhakuakhana College, Kherajkhat College, Lakhimpur Telahi Kamalabaria College, Lakhimpur Girls' College, Lakhimpur Kendriya Mahavidyalaya, North Bank College, North Lakhimpur College
Dhemaji	26, including Dhemaji College, Gogamukh College, Jonai Girls' College, Jonai Science College, Laimekuri College, Moridhal College, Silapathar College, Silapathar Town College, Silapathar Science College, Simen Chapari College
Karbi Anglong	1 - Govt Model College, Deithor, Karbi Anglong
Others	7
Total	177

== Vice Chancellors ==
Joining	Tenure Up to	Vice Chancellors
Aug 2022	—	Jiten Hazarika
Mar 2021	Aug 2022	Lila Kanta Nath
Feb 2021	Mar 2021	Raj Narain Singh Yadav
Jul 2018	Feb 2021	Ranjit Tamuli
Jun 2013	Jul 2018	Alak Kumar Buragohain
Apr 2008	Jun 2013	Kandarpa Kumar Deka
Aug 2002	Mar 2008	Kulendu Pathak
Jul 1997	Aug 2002	Devdas Kakati
Jul 1992	Jul 1997	M. M. Sharma
Jul 1987	Jul 1992	Kamaleswar Bora
Mar 1977	Jul 1987	S. D. Gogoi
Sep 1971	Mar 1977	Jitendra Nath Das
May 1971	Sep 1971	M. N. Phukan
July 1966	May 1971	Bhoj Raj Seth

== Notable alumni ==
- Sarat Barkotoky, Politician
- Jayanta Madhab Bora, Indian Novelist
- Bhupen Kumar Borah, politician
- Joyanti Chutia, Indian Physicist
- Zubeen Garg, Indian singer and actor
- Bismita Gogoi, Indian Politician
- Dip Gogoi, Indian Politician
- Karabi Deka Hazarika, Indian Writer
- Surjya Kanta Hazarika, Padma Shri, Indian Educationist
- Prithibi Majhi, Politician
- Bhrigu Phukan, Indian Politician
- Anuradha Sharma Pujari, Indian Journalist and Author
- Manas Robin, Indian singer and composer
- Amitava Roy, Former Supreme Court Judge
- P. A. Sangma, Indian Politician
- Simanta Shekhar, Indian singer, composer and music producer
- Sarbananda Sonowal, Indian Politician and Minister
- Kamakhya Prasad Tasa, Indian Politician
