= List of Indian state and union territory name etymologies =

This is a list of the origins of the names of states and union territories of India.

== States ==
State name (# on map)	Name in state's official language	Meaning	Notes
Andhra Pradesh (1)	ఆంధ్రప్రదేశ్ (Telugu)	State of Andhras	"Āndhra" is the name of a dynasty mentioned in ancient Sanskrit literature, later used as a synonym for Telugu people. Ancient sources that mention the Andhra kingdom include the edicts of Asoka and Megasthenes's Indica (c. 300 BCE). The earliest extant text to mention the word Andhra is Aitareya Brahmana dated between the 8th and 6th centuries BCE. According to the text (7.18), when Vishwamitra's elder sons refused to accept his adoption of Shunahshepa, he cursed their descendants to be exiled from Aryavarta; the Andhras were one of these descendant groups.
Arunachal Pradesh (2)	Arunachal Pradesh (English)	Land of the dawn-lit mountains	In Sanskrit, aruṇa means "dawn-lit" and achala "mountains". The state is located in the easternmost part of India and gets first sunrise in the country.
Assam (3)	অসম (Assamese)	"Uneven" or from "Ahom"	Most scholars believe that Assam is derived from the Ahoms, who ruled Assam for six centuries. The word Ahom itself may be derived from Shan (śyām in Assamese) or from the Sanskrit word "asama" (uneven, in the sense of "unequal" or "peerless"), referring to its geology which is an equal mix of river valleys and hills. See Etymology of Assam.
Bihar (4)	बिहार (Hindi)	Monastery	From Sanskrit vihāra ("Buddhist monastery"). Foreign invaders often used abandoned viharas as military cantonments; the word Bihar may have come from a large number of viharas thus used in the area. Pronunciation the name with 'B' instead of 'V' is an East Indian tradition.
Chhattisgarh (5)	छत्तीसगढ़ (Hindi)	Land of Chedis	Chhattisgarh translates to "thirty-six forts" in Hindi. There are several theories about what the term "thirty-six forts" refers to; see Chhattisgarh#Etymology. According to the various theories, the term may refer to the 36 pillars of a temple, 36 former feudal territories, or 36 houses. Another theory says that the term is actually a corruption of the word "chedisgarh" that refers to the Chedi Kingdom.
Goa (6)	गोंय (Konkani)	Uncertain, probably related to "cow"	The name Goa came to European languages via Portuguese, but its precise origin is unclear. A number of theories about its origin are centered around the Sanskrit word go (cow). For example, the legend of Krishna names a mountain where he saved the cow; the mountain was named "gomāntaka", which later became Goa. Also, a port city named Gopākapattanam till the 14th century which in Konkani was called Goākaottana and thereby, from it Goa might have derived. For other theories, see Goa#Etymology.
Gujarat (7)	ગુજરાત (Gujarati)	Land of Gurjars	The Gurjars, who ruled the area around the 8th century.
Haryana (8)	हरियाणा (Hindi)	Abode of God or Green Forest	One theory is that the name derives from the Sanskrit words hari (a name of Vishnu) and āyana (home), meaning "the Abode of God". Another theory traces the name to the words harita (green) and araṇya (forest).
Himachal Pradesh (9)	हिमाचल प्रदेश (Hindi)	Land of the snow-clad mountains	In Sanskrit, hima means "snow" and achala means "mountain".
Jharkhand (10)	झारखण्ड (‌Hindi)	Forest Land	jhara means "dense forest" and khaṇḍa means "land" in Sanskrit.
Karnataka (11)	ಕರ್ನಾಟಕ (Kannada)	Lofty Land or Land of Kannadigas	From Kannada, karu (great/lofty) + nāḍu (land/country) = karunāḍu, which means "lofty land", referring to the Deccan Plateau. karṇāṭaka is the Sanskritised adjectival form of karunāḍu, and means "of karunāḍu". In 1947, this state was formed from the princely state of Mysore. In 1956, the Kannada-speaking regions of neighboring states were added to Mysore state. The name was changed to Karnataka in 1973. See Etymology of Karnataka for more details.
Kerala (12)	കേരളം (Malayalam)	Land added on or Land of Cheras or Land of coconut trees	There are three main theories about the derivation of "kērala". (1) According to Hindu mythology, parts of Kerala were created by Lord Parashurama, who reclaimed the land from the sea. Hence the name is derived from Malayalam words, cērnna ("added") and ālam ("land"), hence the Sanskrit keralam, "the land added on". (2) The Chera Kingdom, which ruled most of Kerala from the 1st to the 5th centuries AD, gave its name to the region; chēra ālam later became Keralam. This is often disputed in academic circles because the word Kerala existed even before the rule of Cheras. One of Ashoka's inscriptions describes "Keralaputra" as a land on the Mauryan border. (3) From the word 'Kere' which means coconut. Kerala is a land (Alam) with extreme abundance of coconut trees and hence the name Kerela/Kerala.
Madhya Pradesh (13)	मध्य प्रदेश (Hindi)	Central Lands	Prior to independence, the majority of this area was administered by the British as the Central Provinces and the Central Indian States. At independence, several of these districts were joined together as the Central Provinces and Berar. In 1950, these two regions were merged with Malwa and Chhattisgarh and the term "Central Provinces" was translated to Hindi as Madhya Pradesh.
Maharashtra (14)	महाराष्ट्र (Marathi)	Uncertain, possibly "mahā" (Great) + Sanskritized form of "Ratta dynasty"	The most widely accepted theory among scholars is that the words Maratha and Maharashtra ultimately derive from a compound of mahā (Sanskrit for "great") and rāṣṭrika. The word rāṣṭrika is a Sanskritized form of Ratta, the name of a tribe or dynasty of petty chiefs ruling in the Deccan region. Yet another theory is that the term is derived from mahā ("great") and rathī or ratha ("charioteer"). Another theory states that the term derives from the words mahā ("great") and rāṣṭra ("nation"). However, this theory has not found acceptance among modern scholars who believe it to be the Sanskritized interpretation of later writers.
Manipur (15)	ꯃꯅꯤꯄꯨꯔ (Meitei)	Jewelled Land	From Sanskrit, maṇi ("jewel") + pura ("city"). It seems that naming the said name in account of the past prosperity of land.
Meghalaya (16)	Meghalaya (English)	Abode of the clouds	From Sanskrit, megha ("cloud") and ālaya ("abode"). The state of Meghalaya has reputation of having highest rainfall as compared to other states of country. The wettest place in the world Mawsynram, is located in Meghalaya; said feature of the land is reflected in its name.
Mizoram (17)	Mizoram (Mizo)	Land of the Highlanders	Mi means "people", zo means "hill" and ram means "country". The states of Mizoram, Nagaland, Tamil Nadu and Punjab are exceptions where Sanskrit words are not used in the state name. Mizoram was named after the Mizo tribal dialect and refers to their land.
Nagaland (18)	Nagaland (English)	Land of Nagas	Naga is an exonym used to describe several tribes in the region. The origin of the word "naga" is uncertain, but one theory states that it originated from the Burmese word naka, meaning people with earrings or pierced noses. The British explorers which came into contact with Myanmar in 1795 and with Nagas since 1832, heard about Na-Ka group and anglicised it as Naga, as found in British anthropological and official records. Another theory points to the usage by people of Assam where Naga meaning 'naked', is used for 'primitive man living in natural surroundings in uncorrupted form'.
Odisha (19)	ଓଡ଼ିଶା (Odia)	Land of Odias	The name of the state is derived from the Sanskrit odra viṣaya or odra deśa that referred to the Odra people who inhabited the central part of the region. Sanskrit and Pali literatures mention the Odra people as odraḥ and oddaka.
Punjab (20)	ਪੰਜਾਬ (Punjabi)	Land of five rivers	A combination of the Persian words panj ("five") and āb ("water"). The five rivers are the Beas, Sutlej, Ravi, Chenab and Jhelum.
Rajasthan (21)	राजस्थान (Hindi)	Land of Kings	From rājā ("king") and sthāna ("land or abode") in Sanskrit.
Sikkim (22)	सिक्किम (Nepali)	New Palace	The most widely accepted origin of the name Sikkim is that it is a combination of two words in Limbu: su ("new") and khyim ("palace" or "house"), in reference to the palace built by the state's first ruler, Phuntsog Namgyal. The Tibetan name for Sikkim is Denjong, which means "valley of rice".
Tamil Nadu (23)	தமிழ்நாடு (Tamil)	Homeland of Tamils	Nāḍu in the Tamil language means "homeland" or "nation" hence Tamil Nadu means "homeland of Tamils". The origin of the world "tamil" itself is uncertain: theories range from "self-speech" to "sweet sound" (see Tamil language#Etymology).
Telangana (24)	తెలంగాణ (Telugu)	Land of Trilingas (Three Holy ShivaLingas)	A popular etymology derives the word "Telangana" from Trilinga Kshetras ("land of three lingas"), a region so called because three important Shaivite shrines were located here: Kaleshwaram, Srisailam and Draksharama. Other theories also exists: see Telangana#Etymology. Scholars believe that Telangana derives its name from the word Telinga that refers to the Telugu people. The origins are derived from Gond lands near the Tel river valley area. Angu refers to plural forms in Gondi and Kui languages. Telangu/Telungu has since stayed as the name of the people who migrated from this valley to the south of Godavari river and populated the large swathes of land around them.
Tripura (25)	Twipra (Kokborok)	Three Cities (Sanskrit) Land near water(Kokborok)	The name Tripura comes from Sanskrit, where "Tri(त्रि)" means "three" and "Pura (पुर)" means "city," referring to the myth of three celestial cities destroyed by Lord Shiva. The name symbolizes the destruction of the demon king Tripurasura’s floating fortresses. From Kokborok (twi, "water" + bupra, "near") where, water refers to the Bay of Bengal as Tripura's boundary used to be Bay of Bengal in the South in past.
Uttar Pradesh (26)	उत्तर प्रदेश (Hindi)	Northern Province	Prior to independence, the majority of the territory now comprising Uttar Pradesh was administered by the British under various names—the United Provinces of Agra and Oudh, the United Provinces of British India, and simply United Provinces. The latter name was retained at independence. In 1950, the commonly used initials U.P. were preserved by adoption of the name Uttar Pradesh, meaning "Northern Province" in Hindi.
Uttarakhand (27)	उत्तराखण्ड (Hindi)	Northern Land	From Sanskrit, uttara ("north") and khaṇḍa ("land").
West Bengal (28)	পশ্চিমবঙ্গ (Bengali)	Uncertain, possibly from "Bonga"	The term West Bengal originated after the partition of Bengal province in 1905 by the colonial administration where East Bengal referred to present-day Bangladesh. The origin of the word "Bengal" itself is uncertain (see Etymology of Bengal). Possible origins include the name of a tribe that settled in the area around 1000 BCE and the Austric word for the sun god. Another theory states that the word "Bengal" is derived from the words "Bonga" (a deity in Sarnaism, worshipped by the Santals) + āla (device used in Agriculture). The English word "Bengal" is anglicised form of the Persian word "Bangala" which was in turn derived from the Sanskrit word "Vanga". Vanga was a historical kingdom from the Bengal reigion.The roots of the word Sanskrit "Vanga" is subjected to debate.

== Union territories ==
A clickable map of the 28 states and 8 union territories of India

Union Territory	Original Name in Original language	Part	Description
Andaman and Nicobar Islands (A)	हनुमान् (Sanskrit) which became Malay(Handuman)	Andaman	Italian traveler Niccolò de' Conti (c. 1440) mentioned the word Andaman meant "Island of Gold". A theory that became prevalent in the late 19th century and has since gained momentum is that the name of the islands derives from Sanskrit via the Malay handuman, named for the Hindu deity Hanuman.
Andaman and Nicobar Islands (A)	நக்காவரம் (Middle Tamil)	Nicobar	The name "Nicobar" is probably derived from the Chola dynasty name for the islands, nakkavaram (literally, "naked man" in Tamil) which is inscribed on a Tanjore inscription of 1050 CE.
Chandigarh (B)	चंडीगढ़(Hindi)	—	"Chandi's fort" in Hindi. Although, no actual fort ever existed but according to legends, a large Chandi temple protected the locals, hence the name. The goddess Chandi appears as a form of the goddess Kali or Parvati.
Dadra and Nagar Haveli and Daman and Diu (C)	દાદરા,નગર હવેલી,દમણ,દીવ (Gujarati)	—	From the towns of Dadra, Nagar Haveli, Daman and Diu.
Jammu and Kashmir (D)	जम्बू लोचन(Hindi)	Jammu	From the name of King Jambu Lochan. It so happened that once when he was crossing Tawi, he was very much impressed by a sight of a deer and a tiger drinking water from the same tank. Then he was explained by a group of ministers that because of the features of excellency in that place there was no enemity.
Jammu and Kashmir (D)	𑆑𑆾𑇌𑆖𑆶𑆮𑆩𑆵𑆫(Old Kashmiri and Sanskrit)	Kashmir	It is believed the Vedic sage Kashyapa, was the one who drained the lake of Kashmir and made it into a valley.It was thus named after him as "Kashyapamir"(meaning lake of Kashyapa).The Ancient Greeks called the region Kasperia, which has been identified with Kaspapyros of Hecataeus of Miletus (apud Stephanus of Byzantium) and Kaspatyros of Herodotus (3.102, 4.44). Kashmir is also believed to be the country meant by Ptolemy's Kaspeiria. The earliest text which directly mentions the name Kashmir is in Ashtadhyayi written by the Sanskrit grammarian Pāṇini during the 5th century BC. Pāṇini called the people of Kashmir Kashmirikas.Some other early references to Kashmir can also be found in Mahabharata in Sabha Parva and in puranas like Matsya Purana, Vayu Purana, Padma Purana and Vishnu Purana and Vishnudharmottara Purana. Huientsang, the Buddhist scholar and Chinese traveller, called Kashmir kia-shi-milo, while some other Chinese accounts referred to Kashmir as ki-pin (or Chipin or Jipin) and ache-pin.
Ladakh (E)	ལ་དྭགས།(Tibetian) which became لاداخ(Persian)	—	Ladakh ("la-dvags") means "land of high passes" in Tibetan. Ladak is its pronunciation in several Tibetan dialects, and Ladakh is a transliteration of the Persian spelling.
Lakshadweep (F)	लक्षद्वीप(Sanskrit)	—	"Hundred Thousand Islands". In Sanskrit, lakṣa means "a hundred thousand" and dvīpa means "island".
National Capital Territory of Delhi (G)	𑀥𑀺𑀮𑁆𑀮𑀼(Brahmi) or 𑀠𑀺𑀮𑁆𑀮(Prakrit) or دهليز(Persian)	—	The etymology of "Delhi" is uncertain. The very common view is that its eponym is Dhillu or Dilu, a king of the Mauryan dynasty, who built the city in 50 BC and named it after himself. The Hindi/Prakrit word ḍhīlī ("loose") was used by the Tomaras to refer to the city because the Iron Pillar built by Raja Dhava had a weak foundation and was replaced. Coins in circulation in the region under the Tomaras were called dehlīwāl. Some other historians believe that the name is derived from Dillī, a corruption of dehlīz (Persian: دهليز) or dehalī (Sanskrit: देहली). Both terms mean "threshold" or "gateway" and are symbolic of the city as a gateway to the Gangetic Plain. Another theory suggests that the city's original name was Dhillika.
Puducherry (H)	புதுச்சேரி (Tamil)	—	From Puducheri in Tamil; pudu ("new") + ceri ("settlement" or "camp").
