= Soni =

Soni may refer to:

== Places ==
- Soni, Maharashtra, a village in India
- Soni, Gujarat
- Soni, Nara, a village in Japan
- Soni Falls, Tanzania

== Surname ==
- Soni (name)
- Soni (caste), a Hindu caste of goldsmiths and jewellers
- Soni (Khatri), a clan of the Khatri caste found in north India
- Soni (Maheshwari), a clan of the Maheshwari Marwadi caste in India

== People ==
- Zia Fatehabadi (Actual name Mehr Lal Soni) Indian Urdu ghazal and nazm writer, belonged to the Soni Khatri family of Kapila Gotra

== Other ==
- Soni (film), a 2018 Indian Hindi-language thriller film
- Sohni, a component of Hindustani classical music
- System Operator for Northern Ireland, the transmission system operator for Northern Ireland

== See also ==
- Sony, Japanese conglomerate
- Sohni Mahiwal (disambiguation)
