= Bengali =

Bengali or Bengalee, or Bengalese may refer to:

- Something of, from, or related to Bengal, a large region in South Asia
- Bengalis, an ethnic and linguistic group of the region
- Bengali language, the language they speak
  - Bengali alphabet, the writing system
  - Bengali–Assamese script
    - Bengali (Unicode block), a block of Bengali characters in Unicode

== Other usage ==
=== People ===
- Abdul Wahid Bengali, 19th-century theologian
- Athar Ali Bengali, politician and teacher
- Bengali-Fodé Koita, Guinean footballer
- Bengali Keïta, Guinean centre-back
- Bengali Singh, Indian politician
- Izzatullah Bengali, 18th-century Persian language author
- Mohamed Bengali, Ivorian footballer
- Shah Nuri Bengali, 18th-century Sufi and author

=== Places ===
- Bengali Market, a market in New Delhi, India
- Bengali, Nancowry, a village in Andaman and Nicobar Islands, India

=== Miscellaneous ===
- Bangali River, river in northern Bangladesh
- Bengalee, a ship launched in 1837 and wrecked in 1951
- Bengal cat, a hybrid cat breed, crossing the domestic cat, Felis catus, with the leopard cat, Prionailurus bengalensis
- Bengali, a fictional cat-like humanoid alien character from ThunderCats

== See also ==
- Bengal (disambiguation)
- Bangla (disambiguation)
