= Bangala =

Bangala may refer to:

- Bangala language, a dialect of Lingala that is spoken in Orientale Province in the Democratic Republic of the Congo
  - Lingala language itself
- Bangla, archaic form of Bangla (Bengal)
- Bangala Dam, a dam in Zimbabwe
- Bangala River, a river of Tanzania
- Bangala Station, the former name of Makanza, a town in the Democratic Republic of the Congo

== See also ==
- Bangalla, a fictional country located in Africa in the comic strip The Phantom
- Bangla (disambiguation)
- Shahi Bangalah, a Muslim state established in Bengal during the 14th century
