= Me-Dam-Me-Phi =

Tai annual ancestor worship festival

Me Dam Me Phi 𑜉𑜦𑜧 𑜓𑜪 𑜉𑜦𑜧 𑜇𑜣
- Observed by: Tai-Ahom, People of Assam
- Type: Asian
- Significance: Ancestor worship
- Date: Ancient and middle era - Duin-Ha (Gregorian equivalent to March–April); Modern era - 31 January
- Frequency: Yearly
- Started by: Confucius (tradition of ancestor worship in ancient times); Sukaphaa (ancestor worship festival in Assam)
- Related to: Ancestor worship, Tai folk religion, Confucianism

Me dam me phi (Ahom:𑜉𑜦𑜧 𑜓𑜪 𑜉𑜦𑜧 𑜇𑜣) is a socio-traditional festival celebrated by the Tai-Ahom and people of Assam. The festival has its roots in the ancestral worship of Confucianism in ancient China, which later developed into the Dam-phi (Ancestor worship) tradition of the Tai people. In the modern era it is celebrated on 31 January while initially it was celebrated in the Tai month of Duin-Ha (March–April) of sexagenary cycle.

== Etymology ==
Me-dam-me-phi is a Tai-Ahom word, Mae (𑜉𑜦𑜧) means offering, Dam (𑜓𑜪) means the dead and Phi (𑜇𑜣) means the god. The rituals of the observance of Me Dam Me Phi are written in the book Khyek-lai or Lit Lai Me-Dam-Me-Phi in Tai Ahom language. In other Tai groups distant ancestors are referred as Phi-dam. The ancestor worship ceremonies are mainly divided into two categories: the domestic ancestor worship (Dam-phi) and the social festival (Me-dam-me-phi).

== Origin ==
The Ahoms have their own tenets and faith. A very important part of this religion is ancestor worship. Ancestor worship culture began with the Chinese philosopher Confucius still practiced among the Chinese and the Tai. From the Ahom Chronicle Pyen kaka it can be known that when Lengdon, the king of Mong Phi (The heavenly kingdom; Tian), sent two of his grandsons Khunlung and Khunlai to Mong Ri, present Xishuangbanna, China at that moment Ye-Cheng-Pha the ancestor literacist of knowledge advised them to perform Umpha, Phuralong, Mae Dam Mae Phi and Rik-khwan worships in different months of a year on different occasions to pay respect to the Phi-Dam (Ancestral Spirit) and Khwan elements in the month of Duen-Ha. Since that day till now Mae Dam Mae Phi has been observed by all the Tai-Ahom.

== History ==
=== Middle Ages ===
King's name	event	place
Sukaphaa	three times	First after crossing the Irrawaddy River in Myanmar, secondly crossing the Doi-Kao-Raeng (modern Patkai hills), on the banks of the Burhi Dihing River, thirdly reaching the Brahmaputra Valley and establishing his capital at Namrup, Charaideo
Sukaphaa		Southern Charaideo Langteokat region
Sukaphaa		Charaideo
Suhungmung	Chutia and Kachari kingdom	in the capital
Susengphaa	Three times in total	1606 A.D (after conquering Kapili and Mara Dayang with the Mughals), 1615 A.D. (After winning the first battle with the Mughals, after losing the last time with the Mughals
Sukhamphaa	After the treaty with Konch, Lokni Mung Rao in the month of Din-Sam	in the capital
Suklenmung	After the victory in the Mughal and Kachari battles	
Supungmung	After taking office	Charaideo
Sunyeophaa	According to the advice of the Mo-longs after the wooden beam of the royal court broke	
Sudingphaa	After burying his brother suklingphaa	Under a Nuni tree in Charideo

== Rituals and ceremonies ==
A total of ten gods called Phi are worshiped in Me Dam Me Phi. They are:

1. Khao-Kham
2. Aai Laeng-Din
3. Ya-sing-pha
4. Jan-chai-hang
5. Laengdon
6. Chit-lam-cham
7. Mut-kam tai-kum
8. Dam Chau Phi or Chau Phi Dam (grandparents thirteen generations ago)
9. Ra-khin
10. Ba-khin.

The materials used in the rituals are: Khau Chan (raw rice), Kai Cheng (sacred birds/especially chickens), Kai Khai (chicken eggs), Luklao (Traditional beer usually made from rice), Makmu (coconut), Banplu (pan). khai nukpet (duck egg), Bawk singfa (a sacred flower), maihang (Bamboo Stand), laru karu (sweetmeat), soup tao (pot of water for washing the mouth), tankak (a pot). The rituals of Me Dam Me Phit are performed by Ahom priests such as Ma-Cham, Mo-Plong and Mo-Hung. They build an eight-cornered temple called ho-phi and set up a pang (bamboo stand) for the phis. After paying homage to the Creator Pha-tu-ching with the “Aai Ching Lao” prayer, the priest appealed to the Phi with the welcoming hymn called “Ao Tang”. After the Ao Tang, the offerings are made to the Phi by singing the Kin-tang hymn. After the “Kin Tang”, the Phi are sung a blessing-seeking hymn called “Jon-ming”.After the Jon-ming, a farewell hymn called Boy-tang is sung to the Phi. In Me Dam Me Phit, 27 red chickens are offered to the rest of the Phi except Ra-Khin and Ba-Khin. Eggs are usually offered to Ra-Khin and Ba-Khin. If you offer red chicken to Ra-khin and Ba-khin, you must give flattened rice with it according to the ritual.

== Significance ==
Mae Dam Mae Phi not only reflects the manners and customs of the Ahoms but also helps to create unity, feeling of brotherhood and mutual understanding among the new generation.

=== Me Dam Me Phi and its significance ===
Me Dam Me Phi is one of the important festivals observed by the Ahoms from very ancient times. The word ‘Me’ means offerings. ‘Dam’ means ancestors and ‘Phi’ means gods. So the word ‘Me Dam Me Phi’ means oblations offered to the dead and sacrifices to gods. This festival is observed individually by a family and publicly by a king and the general people. Nowadays this festival is observed so extensively by all the people of Assam that it can better be termed as a festival rather than worship.

The Ahoms perform this worship annually in honour of their ancestors. They believe that a man after his death remains as ‘Dam’ (ancestor) only for a few days and soon he becomes ‘Phi’ (God). They also believe that the soul of a man which is immortal Unites with the supreme soul, possesses the qualities of a spiritual being and always blesses the family.

So every Ahom family in order to worship the dead establish a pillar on the opposite side of the kitchen (Barghar) which is called ‘Damkhuta’ where they worship the dead with various offerings like homemade wine, mah-prasad, rice with various items of meat and fish. The Ahom kings performed this worship after victory in wars and to ward off any imminent danger of the State.

The Ahoms had their own tenets and faith. From the Ahom chronicles it can be known that when Lengdan, the God of heaven, sent two of his grandsons Khunlung and Khunlai to earth by a golden chain at that moment Gasingpha, the God of knowledge advised them to perform Umpha, Phuralong, Medam Me Phi and Rikhwan worships in different months of a year on different occasions. Since that day till now Me Dam Me Phi has been observed by all the Ahoms.

- Rikhan is performed before going to war. It is believed that this worship gave long life to soldiers. They ( the soldiers) took bamboo made fish catching equipment and went to "Borpukhuri" (A large pond). Whatever they get during fishing like fishes, frog, aquatic animals, etc., they put them on cooking utensils Alive during cooking and Served soldiers. It is believed that this ritual gives longevity and they became undefeated.

When Me Dam Me Phi is observed publicly worship is offered in the name of three gods and they are Me Dam Me Phi, Dam Changphi and Grihadam. God Dam Chao Phi is associated with the belief of some natural powers like creation and destruction, water, lightning and storm, sun, moon, learning, diseases, earth, etc.

Worship is done by Ahom priests Deodhai and Bailung by chanting Tai mantras and following the codes given in the Manuscripts like Phralung and Banfi, etc. God Dam Chang Phi is the ancestor God from sixth to the fourteenth generation of a family. Grihadam is also the ancestor God up to the fourth generation of a family. Worship to Grihadam is offered in the month of Kati at the time of harvesting new Ahu rice, in the month of Aghon at the time of harvesting new Sali Dhan and at the time of three Bihus.

On the day of Me Dam Me Phi worship is offered only to Chaufi and Dam Chaufi because they are regarded as gods of heaven. Changphi and Grihadam are not worshipped on that day because they are regarded as earthly gods.
