= Ahomisation =

Assimilation process in the former Ahom kingdom of Assam

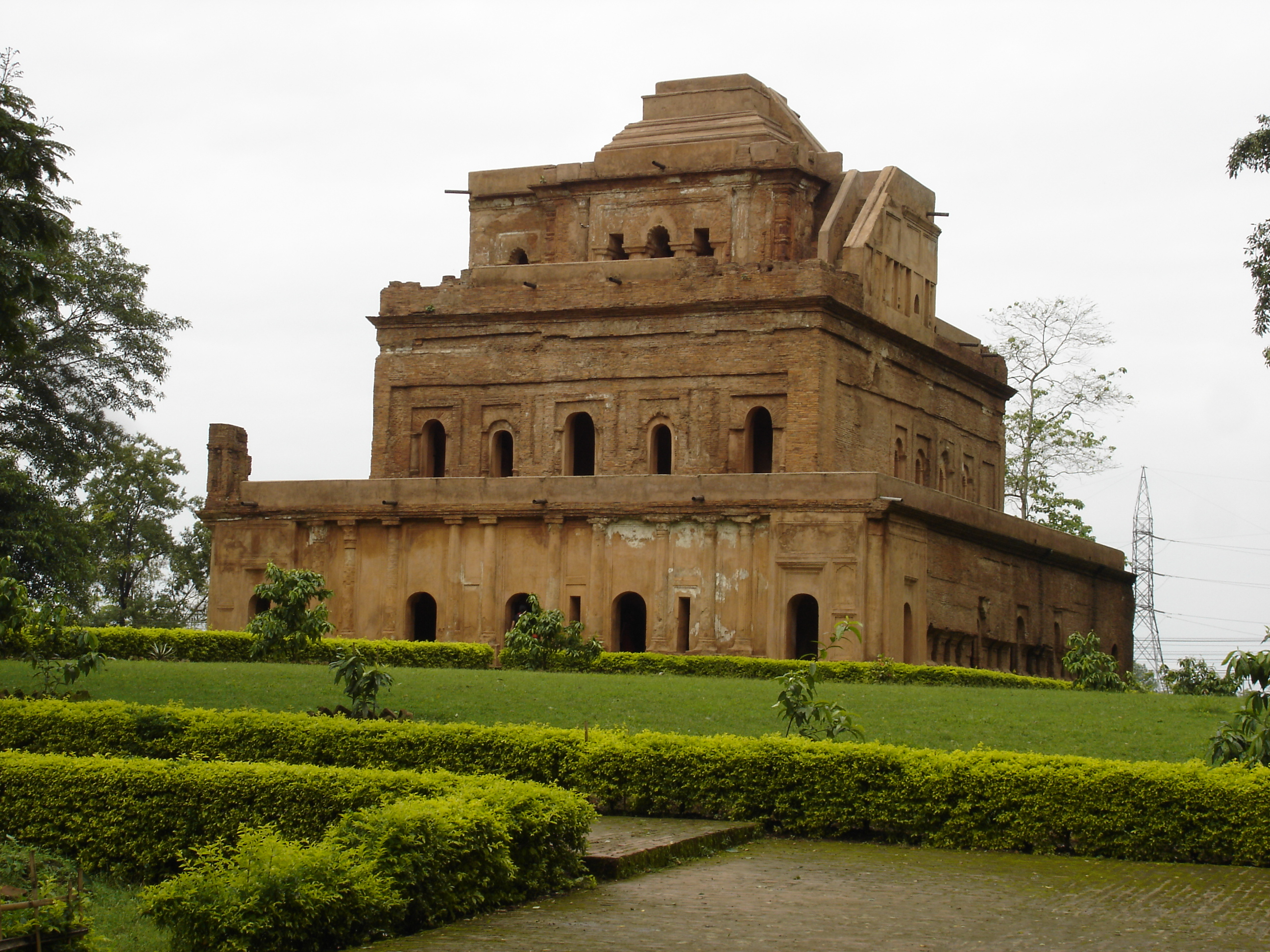
Kareng Ghar made by one of the Ahom Kings situated at Garhgaon

Ahomisation was an assimilation process in the former Ahom kingdom of Assam by which the people from different ethnic groups in the region became a part of what is now considered as the Ahom population.

== History ==
Sukaphaa (reign 1228–1268 CE), was a Tai prince originally from Mong Mao, who along with about nine thousand soldier-agriculturalists arrived in what is now Assam in 1228. After moving between different places, he finally settled in 1253 at Charaideo in eastern Assam and started forming a state. Upon settling in Assam, Sukaphaa established peaceful relations with the local ethnic groups, especially from the Borahi and the Moran. He later married the daughters of both Badaucha, the Moran Chief, and Thakumatha, the Borahi chief and established cordial relations with them. As he began establishing his domain, he avoided regions that were heavily populated. He also encouraged all his Tai soldiers as well as the members of the Tai elites to marry with the locals, which led to the beginning of the process called Ahomisation, he and his mostly male followers creating the admixed population known as the Ahoms. The Shan-Tai settlers displayed great assimilative capacity. While the Shan invaders called themselves Tai, they came to be referred to as Āsām, Āsam and Acam by the indigenous peoples of the region. The modern Assamese word Āhom by which the Tai people were known was derived from Āsām or Āsam. Socially, they fully identified with the multi-ethnic groups of their occupied territory, and the new name Ahom legitimised and recognised their political supremacy and leadership. The conquest of the Moran and Borahi ethnic groups at the initial stage produced the conquest society. The Tai settlers did not exterminate the vanquished population, but instead took them as partners in peace and development.

The Tai settlers brought with them the superior technique of wet-rice cultivation, and believed that they were divinely ordained to bring the fallow land under the plow. They adopted many stateless shifting cultivators of the region into their fold, though they were also conscious of their numerical inferiority. As a result, the Tai-Ahom polity initially absorbed people from various ethnic groups of the region such as Borahi, Moran and Naga. Later, after subjugating the Chutiya kingdom and Dimasa Kingdom, much of the Chutia and the Dimasa-Kachari populace too were absorbed into the Ahom population. Many indigenous people from various ethnic groups were ceremonially adopted into Ahom clans, as recorded in the chronicles known as "Buranji". Thus the illustrious Ahom family of Miri Sandikai was founded by one Miri (Mising), the adopted son of a Burhagohain. King Gadadhar Singha (1681–1696) accepted two Naga princesses as his consorts. The new converts, if capable, were even elevated to important administrative posts. Thus the second Borphukan became the governor of Lower Assam, who was the son of a Naga of Banferra clan. Queen Phuleswari, who took the regalia to her hand during the reign of king Siva Singha (1714–1744), appointed a Bhutanese youth as her page. Kancheng, the first Barpatra Gohain was born and brought up in a Naga family. Miri-Sandikoi and Moran-Patar were Sandikoi and Patar from the Mising and Moran communities, This was true even for the priestly clans: Naga-Bailung, Miri-bailung and Nara-Bailung Ahom Chutias formed a major sub-division of Ahoms. They were termed as such as they intermarried with the already mixed Ahoms. Most of them have been absorbed into the Ahom fold over time. They held various position in the Ahom kingdom's administration as seen with Langi Panisiya Borphukan, Rupchandra Borbarua, Kirtichandra Borbarua, Piksai Chetia Borphukan, Piyoli Borphukan, Badanchandra Borphukan, Phrasenmung Borgohain (during Suhungmung's reign), Thumlung Borgohain (during Rudra Singha's reign), Banrukia Gohain(during Susenpha's reign), Banlungia Gohain (during Rudra Singha's reign) and many more. As per Hiteswar Barbarua's book Ahomar Din(1981), out of 44 Borphukans, 10 were of Chutia-origins (6 Rangachila Duara, 3 Piksai and Burha Chetia, 1 Langi) and out of 41 Borborua, 13 had Chutia-origins (6 Bakatial Buruk Chutia, 4 Rangachila Duara, 3 Lahon) Even during Sukapha's reign, many Chutia and Moran families like Som-chiring(Chutia), Changsai(Chutia) and Lanmakhru(Moran) were absorbed into the Ahom fold. Majority of Ahoms of the Chetia clan as well as the Lahon clan originated from the Chutia community. In this manner, numerous ethnic groups hailing from both the plains and the hills across the region were assimilated into the 'Ahom' population.

The Tai-Ahoms married liberally outside their own exogamous clans and their own traditional religion resembled the religious practices of the indigenous peoples. The Borahis, were completely subsumed into the Ahom fold, though the Morans even today maintain their independent ethnicity, thus terms like 'Sutiya-Ahom', 'Kachari-Ahom', 'Moran-Ahom' have been used in the Buranjis (chronicles). During the pre-colonial period of Assam, the Ahoms were not an ethnic community like it is considered as now, but rather Ahoms were a relatively open status group. Any community coming into the socio-economic fold of the Ahom state could claim the Ahom status with active consent of the king. The modern Ahom people and their culture are a syncretism of the original Tai and their culture and local Tibeto-Burman peoples and their cultures they absorbed in Assam. After the initial contact of the Tai-Ahoms with the local people of the region, the Tai speakers learnt the local language and culture. With better communication and proper running of the Ahom administration, they learnt the local Assamese language. The adoption of Assamese language also changed the language of Chronicle writings, the Buranji(s), where they write their all events. Even though the already mixed group known as 'Ahom' made up a relatively very small portion of the kingdom's population, they still maintained their original Tai-Ahom language alongside Assamese and practised their traditional religion until the 16th century, when the Ahom court, completely adopted the local language of the region, the Assamese language.

This process of Ahomisation went on for till the mid-16th century when the mixed Ahom society itself came under the direct Hindu influence. In the contexts of conquest, the general process is the fact that the subjugated groups normally adopt the language and customs of the conquerors, this was the root of the Ahomisation process. But in Assam even after the process of Ahomisation started in the region, the Ahom kings observed that complete political influence in the country was not possible. And with the expansion of territory of the Ahom kingdom and with the further inclusion of a diverse population a reverse process took place. The conquerors had no other alternative but to sanction the use of the language and culture of the conquered people in the common level of the totality. So after the subjugation of Chutia territories as in Chutia Kingdom, the process of Ahomisation gave way to the process of Sanskritisation (Hinduisation). The process of Sankritisation increased significantly in the 16th and 17th centuries after the expansion of Ahom kingdom westward which led to absorption of many Hindu subjects.

The first Hindu cultural elements came into Ahom royal palace during reign of Sukhaangphaa (1293–1332) when the Koch king of Kamata Kingdom that ruled what is now Western Assam, North Bengal and Northern Bangladesh, offered his daughter to the Ahom king to conclude the battle between Koch and Ahom kingdom. This was the first recorded marriage of an Ahom king with a Hindu princess outside of the kingdom and this event of marriage brought in some Hindu elements to the Ahom royal palace. After the annexation of Chutiya kingdom, Kachari Kingdom and Baro-Bhuyans territories, the Ahoms assimilated their own culture with them. The Ahom royal also later appointed some Chutiyas in their office, inter-married and had relations with them. Thus, the cultural assimilation took place which majorly impacted the social structure, belief and practices in the Ahom society.

== Sanskritisation ==
Gradually, the Ahom royal accepted the influence of Hinduisation, which led to Hindu religion's entry into the Ahom royal palace during the reign of Sudangphaa also known as Bamuni Konwar (reign: 1397–1407). Sudangphaa also appointed a Brahmana as an advisor in the Ahom Royal court and he was the first Ahom king to adopt the coronation of Singarigharutha. Singarigharutha was the traditional coronation ceremony of an Ahom king. It was believed that even though an Ahom prince became a king, he could not attain the status of a full-fledged monarch until his Singarigharutha ceremony was completely performed. Therefore, each Ahom ruler after their accession to the throne tried to organize the ceremony as soon as possible.

Suhungmung (reign: 1497–1539) was the first Ahom king to adopt the Hindu title Swarga-Narayan, a Sanskrit equivalent of Tai-Ahom's Chao-Pha. After the reign of Suhungmung the Ahom king prefer to use their Hindu names in the official records. The kings who were traditionally known with the title of Chao-Pha were replaced by the title of Swargadeo and since then Ahom kings came to be known as the 'Swargadeo'.

The priestly classes of the Ahom like the Mohan, Deodhai and Bailung, mostly remained outside the purview of mainstream Hinduism and continued to express their unwillingness to come into the fold of the Brahmin Hindus. However the traditions of Tai culture and religion can be found to be preserved by some priestly classes in rituals, marriages and festivals which today reflect the Ahom style of living.
