= Yasmin Saikia =

American professor of South Asian history and author

- য়াছমিন শইকীয়া
- Pronunciation: [jasmin xɔikija]
- Born: Assam, India
- Occupations: Historian; professor; author
- Years active: 1994–present
- Works: Bibliography
- Awards: See below

Academic background
- Education: Aligarh Muslim University (BA, 1984; MA, 1986); University of Wisconsin-Madison (MA, 1993; PhD, 1999)

Academic work
- Discipline: History
- Sub-discipline: South Asian history
- Institutions: Carleton College; University of North Carolina-Chapel Hill; Arizona State University
- Notable works: Fragmented Memories: Struggling to be Tai-Ahom in India; Women, War, and the Making of Bangladesh: Remembering 1971

Yasmin Saikia (Note: Assamese: য়াছমিন শইকীয়া, Assamese pronunciation: [jasmin xɔikija].) (Assamese pronunciation: [jasmin xɔikia]) is an American historian. She is the Hardt-Nickachos Chair in Peace Studies and a professor of South Asian history at Arizona State University. Her publications include Fragmented Memories: Struggling to be Tai-Ahom in India (2004) and Women, War, and the Making of Bangladesh: Remembering 1971 (2011).

== Early life and education ==
Saikia was born in Assam, India. She completed a bachelor's and master's degree in history at Aligarh Muslim University in India, and then a master's degree in South Asian history and a PhD in South Asian history with a focus on American and Southeast Asia at the University of Wisconsin-Madison.

== Career ==
Saikia worked as an assistant professor at Carleton College from 1997 to 1999, during which she completed her PHD at the University of Wisconsin, Madison.

Saikia's early academic career includes teaching history and conducting research at the University of North Carolina-Chapel Hill. She regularly returned to Guwahati to visit family and to conduct research in India, and spent a year in Pakistan conducting research. In 2001, she traveled to Bangladesh to conduct research and began conducting interviews with women that would later form the foundation of her 2011 book Women, War, and the Making of Bangladesh: Remembering 1971.

In 2010, she became the Hardt-Nickachos Endowed Chair in Peace Studies and a South Asian history professor at Arizona State University. After she became a professor at ASU, she continued to travel to conduct research. In 2022, she additionally became the co-director of the Center of Muslim Experience in the United States at Arizona State University.

Saikia is the author of several books, including In the Meadows of Gold: Telling Tales of the Swargadeos at the Crossroads of Assam (1997), Fragmented Memories: Struggling to be Tai‐Ahom in India (2004), and Women, War, and the Making of Bangladesh. She has also co-edited various works, including collections intended to become a trilogy: Women and Peace in the Islamic World: Gender, Influence and Agency (2015) and People's Peace: Prospects for a Human Future (2019). In 2022, she was appointed as editor for the Muslim South Asia 15-book series from Cambridge University Press.

=== Fragmented Memories: Struggling to be Tai‐Ahom in India ===
In a review of Fragmented Memories for The Journal of Asian Studies, Jayeeta Sharma writes of how Saikia "posits an alternative view of the precolonial Ahom as a relatively open-status group whose membership came from a diverse set of local peoples participating in a warrior ruling ethos. Rather than an inherited bodily identity, it was a prestigious rank achieved by those who had made it into the king's favor. Later, the British intervention ethnicized the meaning of Ahom and laid the groundwork for the local invention of a Tai-Ahom identity." In a review for The American Historical Review, Sanjib Baruah describes the book as a "significant publication event" in the context of a lack of a "strong intellectual tradition in India of looking at local pasts in autonomous terms", and the limited number of available research visas.

=== Women, War, and the Making of Bangladesh: Remembering 1971 ===
In a review for Human Rights Quarterly, Elora Chowdhury and Devin Atallah describe Women, War, and the Making of Bangladesh as "groundbreaking" because it is one of the few scholarly works addressing the Bangladesh Liberation War of 1971, as well as because of the book's emphasis on the experience of women during the war. They also describe the book as "provocative because it debunks a number of national myths that have shaped the consciousness of the post-1971 nation of Bangladesh." Hannah Sholder describes the book as "unique" in a review for the South Asia Multidisciplinary Academic Journal and writes, "By bringing the experiences of Bangladeshi women from diverse ethnic and religious backgrounds into the spotlight, Saikia not only challenges the often one-sided and nationalistic accounts of the war, but she also produces an alternative discourse that reveals an opportunity for reconciliation to heal the wounds of war which are still festering today among those who experienced the war or its aftereffects."

== Honors and awards ==
- 2005 Srikanta Datta Best Book Award on Northeast India and the Social Sciences, for Fragmented Memories: Struggling to be Tai-Ahom in India
- 2013 Oral History Association Bienniel Book Award, for Women, War, and the Making of Bangladesh: Remembering 1971

== Bibliography ==
- Saikia, Sayeeda Yasmin (1997). In the Meadows of Gold: Telling Tales of the Swargadeos at the Crossroads of Assam (1. publ ed.). Guwahati: Spectrum Publ. ISBN 9788185319612.
- Saikia, Sayeeda Yasmin (2004). Fragmented Memories: Struggling to be Tai-Ahom in India. Durham, NC: Duke Univ. Press. ISBN 9780822333739.
- Saikia, Yasmin (2011). Women, War, and the Making of Bangladesh: Remembering 1971. Durham (N C.): Duke University Press. ISBN 9780822350385.
- Saikia, Yasmin; Haines, Chad, eds. (2015). Women and Peace in the Islamic world: Gender, Agency and Influence. London & New York: I.B. Tauris & Co. ISBN 9781784530174.
- Saikia, Yasmin; Haines, Chad, eds. (2019). People's Peace: Prospects for a Human Future (1st ed.). Syracuse, New York: Syracuse University Press. ISBN 9780815636571.
- Saikia, Yasmin; Rahman, M. Raisur, eds. (2019). The Cambridge Companion to Sayyid Ahmad Khan. Cambridge New York, NY Port Melbourne New Delhi Singapore: Cambridge University Press. ISBN 9781108705240.

== Personal life ==
Saikia is Muslim and a naturalized American citizen.

== See also ==
- Ahom people
- Assamese people
- Rape during the Bangladesh Liberation War
