= Bangla =

Bangla (Bengali: বাংলা) may refer to:

- The endonym of the Bengali language, an eastern Indo-Aryan language
- The endonym of Bengal, a geographical and ethno-linguistic region in South Asia
- Bengalis, the ethnic group group native to the region
- Bangla-, a prefix usually indicating Bangladesh, or anything related to the Bengal region or the Bengali language
- Bangla Ma, or Mother Bengal, the personification of Bengal as a Mother Goddess
- West Bengal, a state in eastern India, also known as (Paschim) Bangla
- Bangla sangeet, or Bangla-gaan, the native terms for Bengali music

== Businesses and organizations ==
- Bangla Academy, the governing body of the Bengali language in Bangladesh
- Paschimbanga Bangla Akademi, the governing body of the Bengali language in West Bengal
- Bangla College, a college in Dhaka, Bangladesh
- Bangla Rail, historical and colloquial name for the Bangladesh Railway
- Bangla Air Force, shorthand name for the Bangladesh Air Force

== Television ==
- ATN Bangla, the first ever satellite-broadcast channel of Bangladesh
- DD Bangla, major Bengali-related channel owned by the West Bengal government
- BBC Bangla, Bengali news channel dedicated to the entire region of Bengal
- Bangla TV, international Bengali channel, mainly concerning Bangladeshi diaspora
- Colors Bangla
- Sun Bangla
- Zee Bangla

== People ==
- Sher-e-Bangla, honorific title of AK Fazlul Haque, Bangladeshi Bengali politician
- Rupasi Bangla'r Kabi (Poet of Beautiful Bengal), nickname of Jibanananda Das

== Places ==
- Bangla Bazar, oldest neighbourhood of Dhaka, Bangladesh
- Bangla, Nepal, city in Lumbini, Nepal
- Bangla Motor, a prominent, heavy-traffic road in Dhaka, Bangladesh

== Others ==
- Bangla (band), a folk-rock band from Bangladesh
- Bangla (drink), an alcoholic drink from West Bengal
- Bangla (2019 film), an Italian film
- Bangla (2006 film), a Bangladeshi film
- Bangla - La serie, a 2022 Italian television series
- Bangla Bachao, an Indian Bengali film
- Rupasi Bangla (Beautiful Bengal), a nickname of Bengal from the titular poem collection
- Dak Bangla or bangla, originally referring to a bungalow, used to mean "a house in the Bengali style"
- .bangla, the secondary Internet country code top-level domain for Bangladesh
- Jago Bangla, newspaper based in West Bengal

== See also ==
- Bengali (disambiguation)
- Bangala (disambiguation)
- Bengal (disambiguation)
- Banga (disambiguation)
- Vanga (disambiguation)
