= Mkuzu River =

River in Tanzania

Coordinates: 4.766°S 38.3603°E

The Mkuzu or Mkusu is a river of northeastern Tanzania. The Magamba Forest Reserve forms part of the landscape and there is a notable waterfall along the river named the Soni Falls, where the Mkuzu joins the Bangala River. The river also flows through the village of Kifungilo.
