= Asom Divas =

State observance in Assam, India

- Statue of Sukapha at Sukapha Samannay Kshetra, Jorhat.
- Observed by: Assam
- Significance: Commemoration of Sukaphaa and the traditional foundation of the Ahom kingdom
- Date: 2 December

Asom Divas or Assam Day, also known as Sukapha Divas, is a state holiday observed annually in the Indian state of Assam on 2 December to commemorate Sukaphaa, traditionally regarded as the first king and founder of the Ahom dynasty. The observance commemorates the conventional date of Sukaphaa's arrival in the Brahmaputra Valley in 1228, traditionally associated with the foundation of the Ahom kingdom.

According to the traditional chronology, Sukaphaa crossed the Patkai hills and entered the northeast region of Kamrupa in 1228. Asom Divas is observed on 2nd December to commemorate his advent and the conventional beginning of Ahom rule in Assam. This chronology has, however, been questioned by recent scholarship, which argues, from Tai and Chinese sources, that the Ahom polity may instead have been established in the mid-14th century.

The Government of Assam officially recognises the day and observes it as a regional public holiday. Government offices and revenue/magisterial courts remain closed, and public institutions, educational establishments and government offices mark the occasion through commemorative programmes and cultural events.

== Origin and recognition ==
The observance originated in 1972, when Saikhowa-based social worker Bhimkanta Buragohain proposed commemorating 2 December as Sukapha Divas. The first observance was held at Rajgarh Primary School in Patidoi Nagaon, Sadiya. The state government has observed 2 December as Asom Divas, also known as Siu-Ka-Pha Divas, since 1996.

== Historical background ==
According to the conventional Ahom chronology, Sukaphaa crossed the Patkai Mountains and entered the Brahmaputra Valley in 1228, a date traditionally associated with the beginning of Ahom rule. Recent scholarship based on Tai and Chinese sources has questioned this chronology and suggested that the Ahom polity may instead have been established in the mid-14th century. Ahom tradition also attributes the establishment of official historical record-keeping and the Buranji chronicles to Sukaphaa. The surviving textual evidence, however, belongs to a considerably later period, and research on the Ahom script indicates that its written form developed between the late 14th and 16th centuries.

== Observance ==
Asom Divas is observed across Assam through cultural programmes, seminars, public meetings, exhibitions and educational activities. Traditional music, dance performances and discussions on Assam’s history and heritage form an integral part of the celebrations. Government departments, educational institutions and cultural organizations actively participate in commemorating the occasion, highlighting the legacy of Sukapha and his role in shaping the historical and cultural identity of Assam.

== See also ==
- Sukapha
- Ahom dynasty
- Ahom kingdom
- History of Assam

== Bibliography ==
- Gogoi, Poppy; Morey, Stephen; Pittayaporn, Pittayawat (2020). "The Tai Ahom sound system as reflected by the texts recorded in the bark manuscripts". Journal of the Southeast Asian Linguistics Society. 13 (2). University of Hawaiʻi Press: 14–42.
