= Names of Bengal =

Bengal (Bengali: বাংলা, romanized: Bangla) is an ethnolinguistic, cultural, and geographic region and historical country located in eastern South Asia, politically split between the sovereign country of Bangladesh and the federal republic of India as the state of West Bengal and Tripura. Despite prospering as sovereign under many native polities in the past, due to its history and complicated internal socio-political divisions, various names have been used to refer to the region and its subsections. The name Bangla is used by both Bangladesh and West Bengal in both global international and cross-border intra-regional contexts. In the Bengali language, the two Bengals each use two different terms interchangeably to refer to the nominally identified ethnic nation: Bānglā (বাংলা) and Baṅga (বঙ্গ. pronounced natively as 'Bongo'), often using the terms epar Bangla/opar Bangla (this Bengal/that Bengal) to contextualize the geopolitical border from each perspective. Prior to the 1947 partition of Bengal, the term Bangladesh (or 'Bangla desh') was by the natives of then undivided Bengal (under the British Raj) used to refer to their entire homeland since late 19th to early 20th century, often in efforts against British imperialism-colonialism. During the Liberation War of Bangladesh in 1971, the Bengalis of then East Bengal under Pakistan, used the name 'Swadhin Bangla' (lit. 'Sovereign Bengal' in Bengali) alongside the historical endonym 'Bangladesh' which they continued using alongside 'Purba Bangla' (lit. 'East Bengal' in Bengali) after the partition of their country into India and Pakistan in 1947 in patriotic contexts and struggles for nationalism against Pakistan, all the way to the independence of Bangladesh. While the Bengalis in the state of West Bengal call the region 'Paschim Bangla' (lit. 'West Bengal' in Bengali).

== Terminology in detail ==
- Geography:
  - Bengal (anglicized form of Bangla) is a region in southern Asia located in the eastern part of the Indian subcontinent at the apex of the Bay of Bengal. Geographically it constitutes majority of the Ganges Delta, the largest river delta system in the world. The region borders the Himalayan states to its north and in the east borders Northeast India and the country of Myanmar.
  - Bangla (Bengali: বাংলা) is the endonymous Bengali name of Bengal (a geographical and ethno-linguistic region in South Asia), it is the endonym of the Bengali language itself as well. Bangla is the contemporary trunated form of its archaic predecessor Bangala which in turn evolved from Vangala. It is also used as a Bengali adjective referring to something of, from, or related to Bengal; the usual English form of which is 'Bengali' (i.e. Bangla Bazar, "Bengali Market"), and sometimes as a prefix form in compound words to indicate a relation to the region or language, although mostly used within the sovereign country of Bangladesh in modern times (i.e. Bangla-gaan, "Bengali music").
  - Banga (Bengali: বঙ্গ) is a transliteration of the Bengali name of the region of Bengal as a geographical and ethno-linguistic region in South Asia.
  - Bangladesh (Bengali: বাংলাদেশ) is a historical endonym of the entire Bengali region from the colonial era and Bengali renaissance period, which literally means 'Bengali Country' or 'Land of Bengal'. The etymology of Bangladesh in its modern Bengali form can be academically traced to the early 20th century, when Bengali patriotic songs, such as "Namo Namo Namo Bangladesh Momo" (1922) by Kazi Nazrul Islam and "Aaji Bangladesher Hridoy" (1905) by Rabindranath Tagore, famously used the term, in opposition to British imperialism on Bengal. The term Bangladesh was often written as two words, Bangla Desh, in the past, even during and after the Liberation War of Bangladesh in 1971 (on banners, papers and stamps), up until around mid 1972 when the country's constitution was finalized with the compound form of the name. Starting in the 1950s, Bengali nationalists used the term Bangladesh (Bangla Desh) in political rallies in East Bengal under Pakistan in struggles for Bengali patriotism, nationalism, self determination and rights until eventually sovereign Bangladesh emerged in 1971. The term Bangla is a major name for both the Bengal region (Bangladesh and West Bengal) and the Bengali language. The origin of the term 'Bangla' is linguistically traced back to 'Vangala' which is believed to be derived from 'Vanga', which is the name of the historical Iron Age Vanga Kingdom (which now resides mostly in Bangladesh and the rest in West Bengal). The ancient term Vangaladesa (now used as 'Bangladesh') for the Bengal region (modern day Bangladesh, West Bengal and Tripura) is found in 11th-century South Indian (Dravidian) copper-plate records in the Sanskrit language (which also means 'Country of Bengal'). The word "Bangāl" and "Banglā" became the most common name for the region during the Islamic and British periods. The historian Abu'l-Fazl ibn Mubarak mentions in his Ain-i-Akbari that the addition of the suffix "al" came from the fact that the ancient rajahs of the land raised mounds of earth 10 feet high and 20 in breadth in lowlands at the foot of the hills which were called "al". The suffix 'desh', a Bengali word, is derived from the Sanskrit word deśha, which means "land", "country" or "nation" in both languages. Hence, the name Bangladesh means "Land of Bengal" or "Country of Bengal". Alternatives to the name Bangladesh are:
    - Bangadesh (Bengali: বঙ্গদেশ; lit. Bengali Country) Bangabhumi or Banglabhumi (Bengali: বঙ্গভূমি/ বাংলাভূমি; lit. Bengali Land) Bangarajya or Banglarajya (Bengali: বঙ্গরাজ্য/ বাংলারাজ্য; lit. Bengali Realm) Bangarashtra or Banglarashtra (Bengali: বঙ্গরাষ্ট্র/ বাংলারাষ্ট্র; lit. Bengali State)
- Politics:
  - East Bengal – The 1947 Partition of Bengal divided the British Indian province of Bengal as part of the formal Partition of India. East Bengal (now Bangladesh), which was predominantly Muslim, became a province of Pakistan. In 1955, East Bengal became the new province of East Pakistan. In 1971, East Pakistan declared Independence during the Liberation War of Bangladesh and the new nation of Bangladesh was formed.
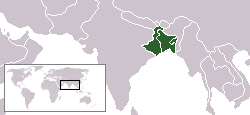
    Map of Bengal proper divided between the Bangladeshi Republic and the Indian state of West Bengal
  - West Bengal – The Partition of Bengal also created West Bengal, a predominantly Hindu province of India. This is the native name of the state, literally meaning "West Bengal" in the Bengali language. In 2016, West Bengal Legislative Assembly passed a resolution to change the name of West Bengal to "Bangla" in English, Bangla in Bengali and Bangal in Hindi. In 2016, Chief Minister Mamata Banerjee had proposed a new name of the state as Bangla. Despite the Trinamool Congress government's efforts to forge a consensus, the Left Front, and the Bharatiya Janata Party opposed the resolution and it awaits the consent of the Indian Parliament for approval. In 2024, Chief Minister Mamata Banerjee had said in the "Bengal Parliament" house, "If they (bjp) don't want to do it for now, when we will be in power; we will change the name ".
  - Bangabhumi or Bir Banga – A separatist movement to create a Hindu country in southwestern Bangladesh, envisioned by Banga Sena.
  - Greater Bangladesh – A political theory circulated by a number of politicians, intellectuals and writers that the People's Republic of Bangladesh has aspirations to unite Bengali-speaking regions into a greater historical Bengal. According to the theory this would include the Indian states of West Bengal, Nagaland, Manipur, Meghalaya, Sikkim, Arunachal Pradesh, Tripura, Assam, Andaman Islands, and the Rakhine State (formerly Arakan) in Myanmar (formerly Burma) as part of its own territory with democratic governance.
  - United Bengal – A proposal that was put forward by Bengali political leaders Huseyn Shaheed Suhrawardy and Sarat Chandra Bose to found a united and independent nation-state of Bengal. The proposal was floated as an alternative to the Partition of Bengal on communal lines.

== Geographical distinctions ==
=== East Bengal ===
West Bengal

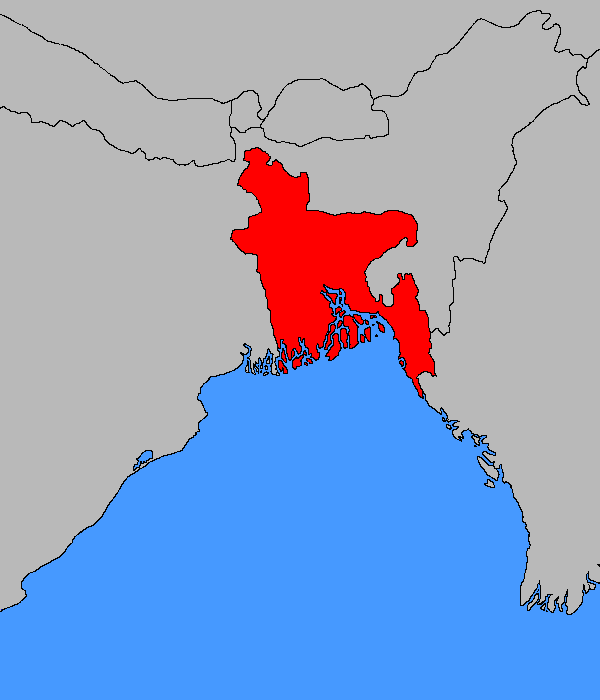
East Bengal

Maps of West Bengal (India) and East Bengal (Bangladesh)

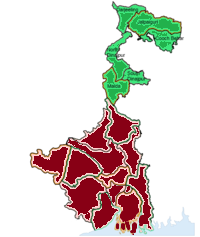
West Bengal

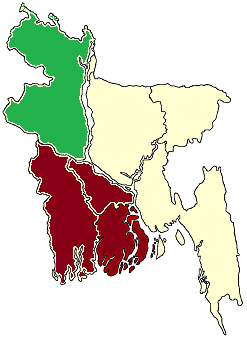
Bangladesh

Maps of West Bengal (India) and Bangladesh, showing North Bengal in green and South Bengal in red

East Bengal (Bengali: পূর্ববঙ্গ Purbô Bangla) was the name used during two different periods in the 20th century for a territory that roughly corresponded to the modern state of Bangladesh. Both instances involved a violent partition of Bengal which made one half East Bengal or Bangladesh.

Historically, it referred to the fertile Bhati region of the Bengal delta, which corresponds to the modern-day Dhaka Division.

=== North Bengal ===
North Bengal (Bengali: উত্তরবঙ্গ) is a term used for the north-western part of Bangladesh and northern part of West Bengal. The Bangladesh part includes the Rajshahi Division and Rangpur Division. Generally, it is the area lying west of Jamuna River and north of Padma River and includes the Barind Tract. The West Bengal part denotes the Jalpaiguri Division (Alipurduar, Cooch Behar, Darjeeling, Jalpaiguri, North Dinajpur, South Dinajpur and Malda). The Bihar parts include the Kishanganj district. It also includes parts of Darjeeling Hills. Traditionally, the Hooghly River divides West Bengal into South and North Bengal, divided again into Terai and Dooars regions.

=== South Bengal ===
South Bengal (Bengali: দক্ষিণবঙ্গ) is a term used for the southwestern part of Bangladesh and the southern part of West Bengal. The Bangladesh part includes the Khulna, Faridpur, and Barisal Divisions. The Bay of Bengal is located at the end of the southern part of Bangladesh. The West Bengal part includes 12 districts in the southern part of West Bengal; Kolkata, Howrah, Hooghly, Burdwan, East Midnapur, West Midnapur, Purulia, Bankura, Birbhum, Nadia, South 24 Parganas and North 24 Parganas.

=== West Bengal ===
West Bengal (Bengali: পশ্চিমবঙ্গ) comprises roughly one-third of the ethno-linguistic region of Bengal. When India gained independence in 1947, Bengal was partitioned along religious lines. The western part went to the Dominion of India (and was named West Bengal).

=== Hilly Bengal ===
Hilly Bengal (Bengali: পার্বত্যবঙ্গ) is a term used for the Chittagong Hill Tracts of Bangladesh. The area consists of Rangamati, Khagrachari and Bandarban.

== Historical names ==
Historical names for Bengal include (in chronological order):

- Bonga – an Austric word for Sun god
- Bang – a Bronze Age proto-Dravidian tribe
- Vanga – a seafaring state located in the eastern part of the Indian Subcontinent comprising today's politically divided Bengal region (West Bengal, India and Bangladesh) also mentioned in Sanskrit text Mahabharata.
  South Asia in BC 300, showing the Chola (blue), Vangadesam (adjoining pink) and Kalinga Kingdoms
- Vangala or Bangala – a name used in early mediaeval period for the Bengal region. King Anandadeva of earlier Deva dynasty of eastern Bengal used the title Sri Bangala Mriganka, which means the moon of Bengal. Pala King Dharmapala was mentioned as the king of Vangala in the Nesari plates (dated 805 AD) of Rashtrakuta dynasty.
- Vangaladesa – a term found in South Indian records in the 11th century.
- Gauda – a kingdom located in Bengal in ancient and medieval times. The Pala emperors were referred to as Vangapati (Lord of Vanga) and Gaudesvara (Lord of Gauda). Sena kings also called themselves Gaudesvara. From then Gauda and Vanga seem to be interchangeable names for the whole of Bengal.
- Gaudavangala – (or Gauda-Vangala) a name used in the Sanskrit text Manasollasa (dated 1129 CE) to denote the whole Bengal region.

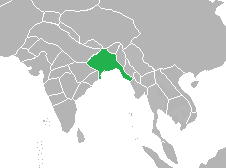
The Bengal Sultanate in 1500, during the reign of Sultan Alauddin Hussain Shah

- Bangala or Shahi Bangala – a sovereign state that encompassed present-day Bangladesh, the Indian state of West Bengal and the Myanmar state of Rakhine between the 14th and 16th centuries. It was a regional power and a melting pot of Muslims, Hindus and Buddhists, located at the crossroads of modern South Asia and Southeast Asia. During the Bengal Sultanate Shamsuddin Ilyas Shah proclaimed himself the first Shah of Bangala in 1342. Bangla became the most-common name for the region during the Islamic period.
- Bengal Subah or Mughal Bengal – a state of the Mughal Empire encompassing modern Bangladesh and the Indian states of West Bengal, Bihar and Orissa between the 16th and 18th centuries. It was established following the dissolution of the Bengal Sultanate. The Mughals played an important role in developing modern Bengali culture and society. By the 18th century, Mughal Bengal had emerged as a quasi-independent state.
- Bengalen or Dutch Bengal – a directorate of the Dutch East India Company in Bengal between 1610 and the company's liquidation in 1800.
- Bengal Presidency – the largest colonial subdivision (presidency) of British India, with its seat in Calcutta, the capital of British-held territories in South Asia until 1911. At its territorial peak in the 19th century, the presidency extended from the present-day Khyber Pakhtunkhwa province of Pakistan in the west to Burma, Singapore and Penang in the east. The Governor of Bengal was concurrently the Viceroy of India for many years. Most of the presidency's territories were eventually incorporated into other British Indian provinces and crown colonies.
  In 1905, the Presidency was partitioned into:
  - Bengal – including present Bihar, Jharkhand and Odisha, headquartered in Calcutta
  - Eastern Bengal and Assam – headquartered in Dacca and Shillong (summer capital).
  British India was reorganized in 1912 and the presidency was reunited into a single Bengali-speaking province. The 1947 Partition of British India resulted in Bengal's division on religious grounds, between:
  - West Bengal – to be renamed as Banga Pradesh in par/aligned with other Indian states respectively.
  - East Bengal, renamed East Pakistan in 1955
- Bangladesh – East Bengal, which became a province of Pakistan according to the provisions set forth in the Mountbatten Plan, later became the independent country of Bangladesh after the 1971 Bangladesh Liberation War.

== Adjectives ==
- Bangla – the contents and attributes of the Bengali language or the country of Bangladesh.
- Bengali – the contents and attributes of Bengal.
- Bangiya (Bengali: বঙ্গীয়) – an adjectival prefix referring to Bengal particularly in the field of literature, e.g. Bangiya Sahitya Parishad, Bangiya Gramin Vikash Bank and Bangiya Janata Dal. Can be synonymous with Bengali people.
- Saṃvangiya – a term historically used in Mahasthan Brahmi Inscription for the local inhabitants of the ancient Pundranagar town of Bengal. It means properly Vangiya or Bengali.
- Bengalese – something of, from, or related to Bengal.
- Bangalee (Bengali: বাঙালি/বাঙ্গালী) – 'Bangalee' is the proper Bengali endonym and transliteration for the 'Bengali' ethnolinguistic group. Until 1978, the Constitution of Bangladesh officially referred all citizens of Bangladesh as 'Bangalee' (or Bengali).
- Bangladeshi (Bengali: বাংলাদেশী) – lit: Native of Bengal. Bangladeshi became the official constitutional demonym for the citizens of Bangladesh in 1978. It was changed from Bangalee to Bangladeshi, to uphold and promote plural and territorial nationalism that considered all non-Bengali minority natives of Bengal (Bangladeshis) and their diverse array of ethnic identity and culture instead of hegemonic Bengali ethnic nationalism of the past.
- Banglabhashi (Bengali: বাংলাভাষী) - iit: Bengali-speaker. A speaker of the Bengali language, often someone to whom it is the mother tongue.
- Bangal (Bengali: বাঙাল; Hindustani: बंगाल, بنگال) – a term used by other Bengalis to refer to Bengalis from East Bengal; this term is primarily used by Ghotis of West Bengal to refer to Bengali Indians of East Bengali heritage. Bangal is also the Hindustani word for Bengal. While not inherently, it has historically bore pejorative and xenophobic connotations towards eastern Bengalis by 'Ghotis'. However, the term is not native to eastern Bengali identity.
- Bangabasi (Bengali: বঙ্গবাসী) – lit: Bengal-resident. Peoples of Bengal.
- Bangadesiya (Bengali: বঙ্গদেশীয়) – something of, from, or related to Bengal or Bengalis.
- Banga-Santan (Bengali: বঙ্গসন্তান) – lit: Son/ child of Bengal- an adjectival prefix referring to People of Bengal or Bengalis.
- Banga-Lalana (Bengali: বঙ্গললনা) – lit: Daughter of Mother Bengal- an adjectival prefix referring to a girl/lady of Bengal or any Female Bengalis.
- Bong – an urban Indian slang used to refer anyone from West Bengal.
- Bongal – is a term used in Assam to refer to outsiders, primarily Bengalis. The term has a negative connotation.
- Gaudajan (Bengali: গৌড়জন): lit: People of Gauda. Ancient name of Bengalis.

== Other names ==
- Gangaridai: (Bengali: গঙ্গাহৃদ/গঙ্গাহৃদয়/গঙ্গাঋদ্ধি; Gangahrid/Gangahriday/Gangaridi) or Gangarashtra (গঙ্গারাষ্ট্র) – meaning Heart of the Ganges / Wealth of the Ganges or Nation on the River Ganges / the Gangetic State.
- Gauda Rajya: (Bengali: গৌড় রাজ্য; Gauḍa rajya) - meaning Kingdom of Gauda. Bengal is described in ancient Sanskrit texts as 'Gaud-desh' (Gauda country) and 'Gauda Vangala' (Gauda Bengal).
- Pal Samrajya: (Bengali: পাল সাম্রাজ্য) - meaning the Pala Empire. The only known native empire of Bengal; 750–1161 CE.
- Rahma: (Arabic: رحمة; Rahma) meaning, Land of Mercy.
- Mèngjiālā: (Chinese: 孟加拉).
- Bengalen: German-Dutch for Bengal.

== Sobriquets for Bengal ==
In traditional Bengali culture, as well as in the Bengali Media, the land of Bengal has assumed a number of sobriquets over the centuries, including:

- Sonar Bangla (Bengali: সোনার বাংলা); Golden Bengal
- Rūpasī Bangla (Bengali: রূপসী বাংলা); Beautiful Bengal
- Shayamal Bangla (Bengali: শ্যামল বাংলা); Green Bengal
- Epar Bangla (Bengali: এপার বাংলা); This side Bengal, used by Bengalis for their Native Bengal.
- Opar Bangla (Bengali: ওপার বাংলা); That side Bengal, used by Bengalis from both Bangladesh and West Bengal to refer to each other.
- Bharatiya Bangla (Bengali: ভারতীয় বাংলা); Indian Bengal, used by Bangladeshi media for Indian state of West Bengal.
- Padmapar (Bengali: পদ্মাপাড়); Bank of River Padma, used by Indian Bengali media for Republic Bangladesh.
- Nodimatrik Desh (Bengali: নদীমাতৃক দেশ); Riverine country or the Country of the River, used for both Bengal and Bangladesh.
- Hazar Nodir Desh (Bengali: হাজার নদীর দেশ); the Country of the Thousand Rivers, used for Bengal.
- Chhoy Ritur Desh (Bengali: ছয় ঋতুর দেশ); the Country of the Six Seasons, used for Bangladesh.

== See also ==
- Bangamata
