= Sohni Mahiwal (disambiguation) =

Sohni Mahiwal is a classic Punjabi and Sindhi folk tragedy.

Sohni Mahiwal may also refer to the following based on the folktale:

- Sohni Mahiwal (1946 film), 1946 Indian film
- Sohni Mahiwal (1958 film), 1958 Indian Hindi-language film, starring Bharat Bhushan and Nimmi
- Sohni Mahiwal (1984 film), 1984 Indian Hindi-language film, starring Sunny Deol and Poonam Dhillon

== See also ==
- Soni (disambiguation)
- Sohni, a raga in Hindustani classical music
