= Mohamed Bengali =

Ivorian footballer

Personal information
- Full name: Razak Mohammed Bengali
- Date of birth: 20 November 1988 (age 37)
- Place of birth: Abidjan, Ivory Coast
- Position: Defender

Team information
- Current team: R.S.C. Anderlecht
- Number: 16

Youth career
- 1999–2004: Toumodi F.C.
- 2004–2006: R.S.C. Anderlecht

Senior career*
Years	Team	Apps	(Gls)
2007–	R.S.C. Anderlecht	3	(0)
2007–2008	→ R. Union Saint-Gilloise (loan)	3	(0)
- * Club domestic league appearances and goals

Razak Mohammed Bengali (born 20 November 1988 in Abidjan) is an Ivorian footballer who currently plays for R.S.C. Anderlecht.

== Career ==
Bengali began his career by R.S.C. Anderlecht and was loaned out to R. Union Saint-Gilloise in 2008. He made his debut in professional football, being part of the R. Union Saint-Gilloise squad in the 2007–08 season.
