= Soni Falls =

Waterfall in Tanzania

Coordinates: 4°50′48″S 38°20′34″E

The Soni Falls is a waterfall in the Usambara Mountains of northeastern Tanzania, near the village of Soni, to the northeast of Kitunda. The falls lie at the end of the Mkuzu River where it joins the Bangala River. The falls lie in the southern part of the West Usambaras Lushoto Mountain Reserve.
