= Bangla Bachao =

2011 Indian film directed by Anup Sengupta

- Directed by: Anup Sengupta
- Story by: Somnath Bhattacharya
- Starring: Prosenjit Chatterjee, Paoli Dam
- Music by: Shubhayu
- Release date: 28 January 2011
- Country: India
- Language: Bengali

Bangla Bachao (transl. Save Bengal) is a Bengali movie directed by Anup Sengupta, starring Prosenjit Chatterjee and Paoli Dam. The movie was released on 28 January 2011.

== Plot ==
The movie "portrays the saga of Bengal politics and how the politicians have created a dangerous situation making it difficult for the people of Bengal to lead a peaceful life. The story of the film revolves around recent activities happening in Bengal."

== Cast ==
- Prosenjit Chatterjee, as Asutosh Sen
- Paoli Dam, as Mandira, a television news reported
- Kalyani Mandal, as Asutosh's mother
- Raja Chatterjee, as Anshu, the elder brother of Asutosh
- Mrinal Mukherjee, as a minister of the ruling party
- Dipankar De, as owner of a news channel
- Biswajit Chakraborty, as police commissioner
- Anamika Saha, as Maya Devi
- Saheb Bhattacharya, as Bishal
- Arpita, as Tina
