= Etymology of Assam =

Though the precise Etymology of Assam, a state in India is unclear—there is general agreement that it is related to the Ahom people. Whatever the source of the English name, Assam is itself an anglicization.

== Scholarly views ==
John Peter Wade (1805) called the Ahom kingdom, that commenced on the Konder Chokey, "Kingdom of Assam". Some have speculated that the Bodo word "Ha-sham" meaning land of Tai people while other speculate the Bodo word "Ha-com" meaning low land was Sanskritised to 'Asama', dating its origin to at least first millennium common era. While some believe the name Asama is a Sanskrit originated word which means unparalleled because of its unequal terrain with hills interspersed with valleys

Banikanta Kakati quotes Grierson in Linguistic Survey of India that "While the Shan called themselves Tai, they came to be referred to as Āsām, Āsam and sometimes as Acam by the indigenous people of the country. The modern Assamese word Āhom by which the Tai people are known is derived from Āsām or Āsam. The epithet applied to the Shan conquerors was subsequently transferred to the country over which they ruled and thus the name Kāmarūpa was replaced by Āsām, which ultimately took the Sanskritized form Asama, meaning "unequalled, peerless or uneven" Satyendranath Sarma repeats this derivation while quoting Kakati. Colin Masica too endorses this view.

Satyendra Nath Sarma writes "Assamese is the easternmost Indo-Aryan language of India, spoken by nearly eight millions of people inhabiting mostly the Brahmaputra valley of Assam. The word Assamese is an English formation built on the same principle as Simhalese or Canarese etc. It is based on the English word Assam by which the British rulers referred to the tract covered by the Brahmaputra valley and its adjoining areas. But the people call their country Asama and their language Asamiya".

== Early names ==
=== Kamarupa ===
The earliest epigraphic mention of the Assam region comes from Samudragupta's Allahabad stone pillar from the fourth century CE, where it is called Kamarupa. The pillar lists the frontier kingdoms (pratyanta nripati) and lists Kamarupa (Western Assam) along with Davaka, a region in the central Assam (undivided Nagaon district). Therefore, during the fourth century, the eastern boundary of the Kamarupa did not extend beyond west Assam. The Kalika Purana (10th century) and the Yogini Tantra (16th/17th century) refer to Kamarupa as a kingdom from Karatoya in the west to Dikkaravasini in the east. Dikkaravasini is identified with present-day Sadiya. The copper-plate inscription from Vaidyadeva calls Kamarupa a mandala within his own kingdom. Later epigraphic sources from Assam call the kingdom Pragjyotisha-Kamarupa. In the early twelfth century, epigraphic sources from the Pala dynasty mention Kamarupa as a mandala of the kingdom they ruled. The invasion of western Assam by Allauddin Hussein of Gaur up to Barnadi river in 1498 is recorded in coins from the early sixteenth century, declaring Hussein as the conqueror of Kamru (Kamrup) (and not Assam). The Kamarupa kings called themselves the Maharajadhiraja of Pragjyotisha. One of the kings Vaidyadeva, referred to Pragjyotisha as a bhukti and Kamarupa as a mandala (a smaller division, possibly within Pragjyotisha).

== Asam and variations ==
Assam, Asam and other variations started appearing in relatively recent times, and their uses cannot be attributed to any period earlier than the sixteenth century, and is associated with the Shan invaders. The names appeared primarily in three different scripts: the Assamese, Persian and the Roman scripts. The sixteenth century is the period when Srimanta Sankardeva established his Ekasarana Dharma. This was accompanied by a profusive production in literature. At the same time, Vishwa Singha established the Koch kingdom in the west and the Ahom kingdom saw both a rapid expansion in territory and an increasing Hindu and Assamese influence in its court under Suhungmung. This increased prominence of the Ahom kingdom brought it to the attention of those outside the Brahmaputra valley.

Name	Source	Period	Refer to
Asama	Bhagavata of Sankadeva	early 16th century	Ahom community
Asama	Darrangraj Vamshavali	16th century	Ahom community
Asham	Ain-i-Akbari	late 16th century	Ahom kingdom
Āsām, Āsam, Asam	Sankar-carit	17th century	Ahom community
Assam	Joh van Leenen	1661	Ahom kingdom
Aſem	John Baptiste Tavernier	1678	Ahom kingdom
Acham	A Geographical Account of Countries around Bay of Bengal	c1679	Ahom kingdom
Acamakshara	CP grant of Rajeswar Singha	1764	Ahom script
Asamkshara	CP grant of Lakshmi Singha	1773	Ahom script
Assam	"A Geographical Sketch of Assam"	1805	Ahom kingdom
Assam	Treaty of Yandabo	1826	North East India (Minus Tripura and Manipur)

=== Local forms ===
Locally, Vaishnavite writers and biographers used different forms of the name indiscriminately (e.g. Āsām, Āsam, Asam) to refer to the Ahom community. The earliest mention of Asama is found in the Assamese Bhagavat of Sankardeva, which was composed in early sixteenth century. The relevant stanza is (in iTrans):

kiraTa kachhaari khaachi gaaro miri
yavana ka~Nka govaala |
asama maluka dhobaa ye turuka
kubaacha mlechchha chaNDaala ||

The Ahoms were called Asam in the eighteenth century Darrangraj Vamshavali of Suryya Khari Daibajna; variously as Āsām, Āsam, and Asam in the seventeenth century Shankar-carit of Daityari Thakur; and Acam in Kamrupar Buranji. According to a count provided by (Bhuyan 1930), the Kamrupar Buranji names the country some thirty times, of which Āsām was used three times, Ācam was used three times, and Ācām was used for the rest, though in other Buranjis other spellings are also seen. Furthermore, Bhuyan mentions that though both "স" (s) and "চ" (c) have been used in the name, it is likely that it was pronounced mostly with ⟨s⟩.

The name asama (as well as acam, asam, asam, asam) was used in the form asamakshara to denote the Ahom script in Sanskrit-Ahom bilingual copper plate grants of the Ahom kings.

Local Forms in the Buranjis
Local Form	In Kamrupar Buranji
আচাম	24
আসাম	3
আচম	3
অসম	0
অচম	0
ৱচম	0

=== Mughal forms ===
As opposed to the local uses, where Asam and similar formations were used to denote the Ahom community, external sources used variations of Asam to denote the kingdom ruled by the Ahoms. The Ain-I-Akbari of the sixteenth century uses the form Asham (آشام) to denote the Ahom kingdom. The official chronicler of Mir Jumla also calls the place "Asam".

=== European forms ===
The earliest Europeans who came in contact with Assam (and who had the opportunity to write the name in the Latin script), were travelers who went to Bengal and adventurers who accompanied military expeditions against the Ahom kingdom; these groups used variations of the name Asam to denote the kingdom. In a map of "Kingdom of Bengale", drawn by Joh. van Leenen around 1661 and published around 1662, Assam was clearly named and correctly identified. One of the first unambiguous references comes from Thomas Bowrey in 1663 about Mir Jumla's death: "They lost the best of Nabobs, the Kingdome of Acham, and, by consequence, many large privileges". Though Bowrey wrote his manuscript in the 17th century, the manuscript itself was published for the first time in the 20th century. On the other hand, Jean-Baptiste Tavernier's Travels in India, published in 1676 uses the spelling "Assem" for Assam in the French original (Aſem in the English translation, published in 1678). Thus the earliest English use of the name was "Aſem", with a Long s.

Colonialists then followed these travelers and adventurers. Both Grierson and Gait agree that the British used Asam before finally settling on Assam. In various documents of the British East India Company relating to the last few Ahom kings, the name of country was mentioned as Assam. The 1826 Treaty of Yandabo, marking the conquest of the Ahom kingdom at the hands of the British, uses Assam to denote the area under the erstwhile Ahoms and its protectorates (Darrang Koch, Jaintias, Kacharis and some hill areas in the present Arunachal Pradesh and Nagaland).

After the British took control of the region, the name Assam was extended to the province that was then much larger than the Ahom kingdom. It then included, Garo Hills and Lushai Hills (Mizoram). Since that time, the boundaries of Assam have been repeatedly redrawn, though the name Assam remained. Today, the political boundary of Assam contains roughly the historical Ahom Kingdom and its protectorates, the Kachari kingdom, Koch Hajo and a part of the Jaintia Kingdom.

== Modern name Assam ==
According to Grierson (1967), the English word Assamese parallels other demonyms (Chinese, Sinhalese, Nepalese, etc.), building on Assam, an Anglicization of the Sanskrit word Asama that itself refers to the Brahmaputra Valley. Other writers (most notably Banikanta Kakati and S N Sarma) have repeated this claim. Gait (1906) has mentioned that the British used Asam before finally settling on Assam; though Grierson claims that the form Assam is English, The Assam Tribune has reported the finding of a Dutch map drawn around 1661 with a label Assam. The word Asamese is recorded to have been first used by Francis Hamilton in his travels to Assam from 1807 to 1814 to refer to the Ahom Language

== Theories on etymology ==
The precise etymology of the name Assam or Asam (অসম) is not known, though many explanations have been put forward. Among the different theories, two attribute the name to the terrain of the region while three attribute it to the Shan conquerors of the 13th century. It is also important to note that the word Assam is not recorded to have been used before Ahom arrival.

=== Ha-com: from Bodo ===
One of the earliest theories published was provided by Baden-Powell in 1896, when he proposed that the name could possibly derive from the Bodo Ha-com, meaning "low or level country". He rejected the possibility that the name Assam (Asam) could be derived from Aham (Ahom). Subsequent writers like P. C. Choudhury R N Mosahary and Subir Gosh lend credence to this theory.

=== Asama: from Sanskrit ===
Two different meanings of the Sanskrit word Asama have been used to explain the name: one meaning "uneven" (terrain) and the other "unequaled".

Gait (1906) reports that according to some people, the name "Assam" is derived from the Sanskrit asama, meaning "uneven" which describes the terrain of the region in contrast to the flat plains of Samatata, though he rejects this explanation on the grounds that the word was never used before the advent of the Ahoms and that the Vamshavali of the Darrang kings used it to refer to the Ahom community and not to the land.

The second theory Gait reported is that Asama, meaning "unequal" or "peerless", was a name the local people gave the undefeated Ahoms, according to a tradition that the Ahoms themselves believed in. Gait rejects this notion as well, noting that the local tribal people would not have given a Sanskrit name to the invaders.

Though Gait rejects both these explanations, he nevertheless asserts that the name is somehow associated with the Ahoms. George Grierson, Banikanta Kakati, and Dimbeswar Neog, also reject the Sanskrit origin of the name. Satyendra Nath Sharma accepts Banikanta Kakati's view in toto.

Though both explanations have been rejected in the academic literature, the notion that the name Assam has a Sanskrit origin continues to hold sway in popular perceptions, due mainly to two standard dictionaries of Assamese: Hemkox and Chandrakanta Abhidhan. The Hemkox forwards the second theory, associating the name to the meaning "unequaled".

=== A-Sham: from the name Sham ===
Gait reports that some associated the name with the Shan who are called Syam by the Assamese, an explanation which he found not convincing. nevertheless Grierson has accepted that the 13th century natives of Assam called the Shan (Sham) invaders by this name. Dimbeswar Neog notes that the Indic prefix a- does not necessarily mean an antonym in Assamese and it could just be a synonym (e.g. kumari/akumari, bihane/abihane), a feature that is also seen in Sanskrit (sur/asur); therefore, Asham could mean the same as Sham, and the name could be derived as Sham (শাম) > Āshām (আশাম) > Āsam (আসম) > Asam (অসম). Amalendu Guha, too derives it from Sham; but instead of using an Indo-Aryan rule, derives it from the Bodo form, Ha-Sham, meaning the land of the Sham people. Masica too believes that Assam derives from an earlier attested form of asam, acam which in turn is from a Burmese corruption of the name Shan/Shyam.

=== A-cham: from Tai ===
(Kakati 1953) derives the name from a Tai root, cham (defeated), with an Indic prefix for negation, a-, so that a-cham would mean undefeated.
