= Soni, Maharashtra =

Village in Maharashtra

Soni
- village
- Location in Maharashtra, India Soni (India)
- Coordinates: 16.9539°N 74.6898°E
- Country: India
- State: Maharashtra

Languages
  - Official: Marathi
- Time zone: UTC+5:30 (IST)
- ISO 3166 code: IN-MH

Soni is a village in Taluka - Miraj in southern Maharashtra State, India. Farming is the main business in Soni.

== From the Maharashtra Gazette ==
- Village Name: Soni
- Direction : N
- Travelling distance: 12.0
- Area (Sq: miles.: 7.4
- Population:6,255
- Households: 1362
- Agriculturists: 1213
- Post Office: Local
- Distance: 0
- special: grapes farm

== Status of drinking water and sanitation facilities for school ==
1. Name of School: Balwadi No.4
2. Name of Habitation: Main
3. Category of School: Balwadi/Aanganwadi
4. Classification of School: Government
5. Number of Students: 41
6. Facilities Available: Sanitation (Both)
7. Separate Toilets available for Boys & Girls: Yes (For Both) #Separate Urinal Facility available for Boys & Girls: Yes (For Both)
8. Reasons for Non-availability of Drinking Water Facility: Multiple reasons
9. Reason for Non availability of Sanitation Facility: NA
10. Target for Drinking water: Month: Mar Year: 2007
11. Target for Sanitation: Month: NA Year: NA
12. Source of funding (Drinking water facility): ARWSP
13. Source of funding (Sanitation facility): NA
- NA : Not Applicable

== As per Indian Railways (Central Railways) ==
No. Section Year of Completion 17. Birlanagar-Soni (55.5 km) (Part of Guna-Etawah ) 2000
