= Trilinga Kshetras =

Temples in India

Locations of Trilinga Kshetras

The land of the Telugu people was referred to, during ancient times, as Āndhra dēśa (country of Andhra) and Trilingadēśa (country of Trilinga). The word Telugu is believed to have been derived from trilinga, as in Trilinga Desha, "the country of the three lingas". According to legend, the deity Shiva descended as a lingam on three mountains that marked the boundaries of the Telugu country, namely Kaleshwaram in Telangana, Srisailam in Rayalaseema and Bhimeswaram, also known as Draksharamam, in Coastal Andhra. It was also believed that the word Telangana derived from Telingana, Telinga, Trilinga.

In Andhra Kaumudi, a Telugu grammar book, it was mentioned that Andhra Vishnu, having built an immense wall connecting the three mountains with the Mahendra hills, formed in it three gates, in which the three-eyed Ishwara, bearing the trident in his hand and attended by a host of divinities, resided in the form of three lingams. Āndhra Viṣṇu assisted by divine angels having fought with the great giant Nishambhu for thirteen yugas killed him in battle and took up his residence with the sages on the banks of the river Godavari, since which time the Telugu country has been named Trilingam.

"Trilinga" changed to "Telinga" over time and gradually again to "Telangana". Usage of "Telangana" came to distinguish the predominantly Telugu-speaking region of the erstwhile Hyderabad State from its predominantly Marathi-speaking one, Marathwada. After Asaf Jahis ceded the Seemandhra region to the British, the rest of the Telugu region retained the name Telangana and the other parts were called Madras Presidency's Circars and Ceded.

== Temples ==
Kshetram	Presiding Deity	District	Region	State
Kaleshwaram	Kaleshwara Mukteeshwara Swamy	Jayashankar Bhupalpally	Telangana	Telangana
Bhimeswaram (Draksharamam)	Bhimeswara Swamy	Konaseema	Coastal Andhra	Andhra Pradesh
Srisailam	Mallikarjuna Swamy	Nandyal	Rayalaseema	Andhra Pradesh

== See also ==
- Andhras
- History of Andhra Pradesh
- History of Telangana
