= Sukapha =

Ahom king from 1228 to 1268

Sukaphaa
- Chaolung
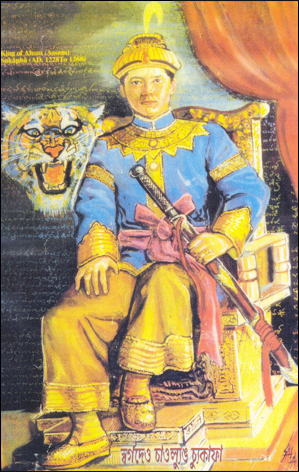
- Fictional representation of Sukapha by Pushpa Gogoi

Ahom King
- Reign: 1228–1268
- Predecessor: Post established
- Successor: Suteuphaa
- Born: c. 1189; Möng Mao
- Died: 1268 (aged 78–79); Charaideo, Ahom kingdom (present day India)
- Burial: Sukaphaa Maidam, Charaideo
- Spouse: Ai-Me-Chao-Lo; Nang-Sheng-Chum-Hpa; Yi-Lo-Weng-Ching-Chum-Hpa
- Issue: Suteuphaa
Names
- Chaolung Sukaphaa
- House: Su/Tsu (Tiger) clan
- Dynasty: Ahom dynasty
- Father: Chao Chang-Nyeu
- Mother: Blak Kham Sen
- Religion: Ahom religion

Sukapha (r. 1228–1268), also Siu-Ka-Pha, was the founder and the first king of the Ahom kingdom in medieval Assam. A Tai prince from Möng Mao, the kingdom he established in 1228 existed until 1826 and came to incorporate large parts of modern Assam. In reverence to his position in Assam's history, the honorific Chaolung is associated with his name (Chao: lord; Lung: great). In 1996, the Assam Government decreed his annual remembrance on 2 December as Sukapha Divas, or Asom Divas (Assam Day), to commemorate his advent and entry into Assam.

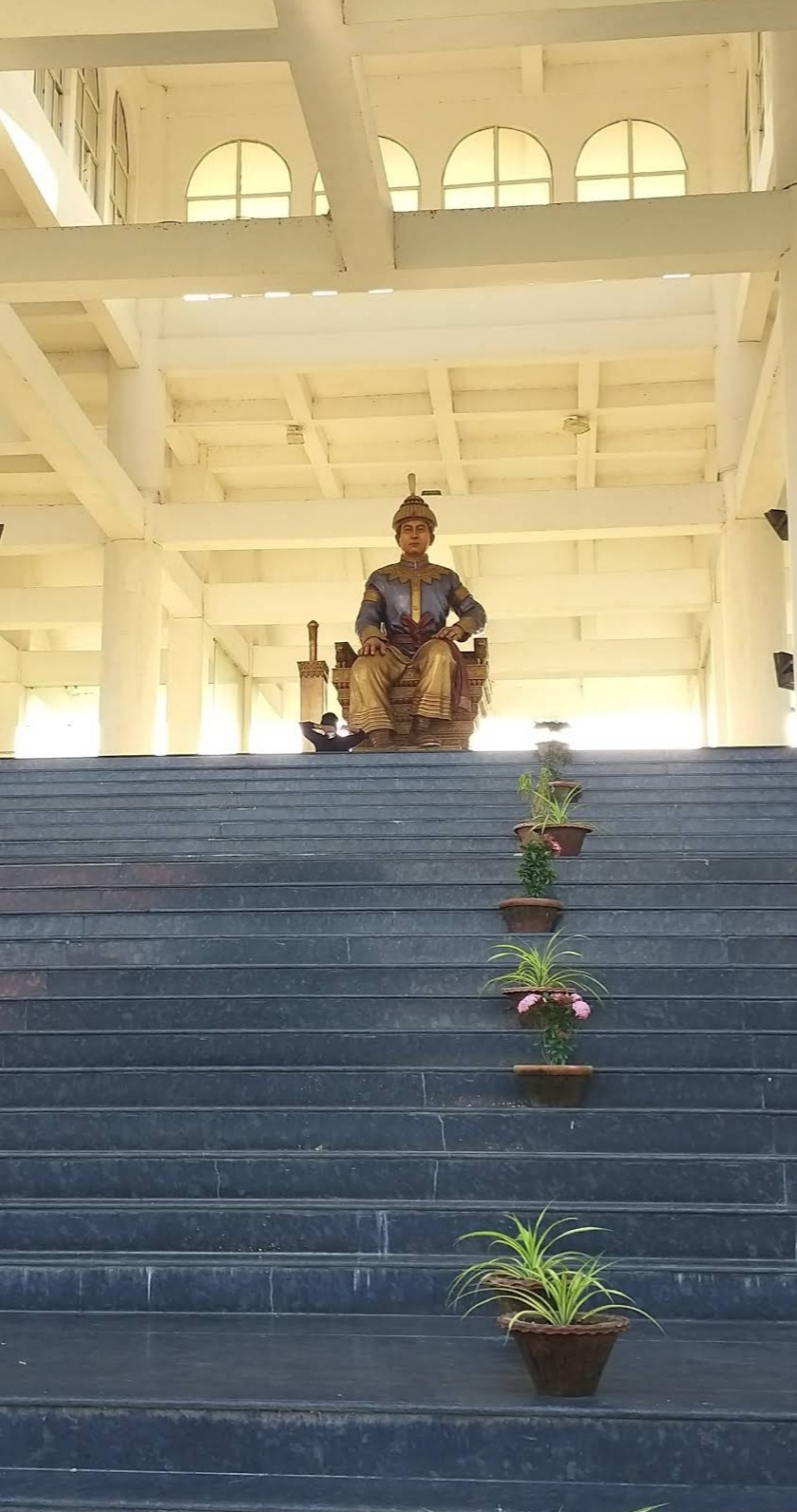
Su-Ka-Pha Sammanay Khetra statue, Assam

== Ancestry ==
The details of Sukapha's life and origins before his entry into Assam, available from different chronicles, both Ahom and non-Ahom, are full of contradictions. According to Phukan (1992) who has tried to hold up a consistent account, Sukapha was born to Chao Chang-Nyeu (alias Phu-Chang-Khang) and Nang-Mong Blak-Kham-Sen in the Tai state of Möng Mao (also called Mao-Lung, with the capital at Kieng Sen), close to present-day Ruili in Yunnan, China. Chao Chang Nyeu was a prince from Mong-Ri Mong-Ram, who had travelled to Mong Mao possibly on an expedition. Mong Mao was then ruled by Chao Tai Pung. Chao Chang Nyeu was later befriended by Pao Meo Pung, the son of the ruler, who gave his sister Blak Kham Sen in marriage. Sukapha was born of this union not later than 1189 CE and was brought up by his maternal grandparents. Pao Meo Pung, who eventually ruled Mong Mao, had no male heir and Sukapha, his nephew, was nominated to succeed him. A son born late to Pao Meo Pung's queen ended Sukapha's claim to the throne of Mong Mao.

== Journey into Assam ==
Sukapha left Mong Mao in 1215. He was accompanied by three queens, two sons and a daughter; chiefs from five other dependent Mongs; members of the priestly class and soldiers—a total contingent of 9,000. Some commoners are recorded as having joined this core group on the way. Sukapha had with him 300 horses fitted with saddles and bridles and two elephants. Heavy arms were transported along a different route. Sukapha followed an older known route from Yunnan to Assam that passed through Myitkyina, Mogaung and the upper Irrawaddy River valley. On his way he stopped at various places and crossed the Khamjang River to reach the Nangyang lake in 1227. Here he subjugated the Nagas very ferociously and established a Mong. He left one Kan-Khrang-Mong there to guard the passage back, and proceeded to cross the Patkai hills at the Pangsau pass and reached Namrup (in the Brahmaputra Valley) in December 1228. The journey, from Mong Mao to Namrup thus took Sukapha about thirteen years and the year he reached Namrup is considered as the year the Ahom kingdom was established.

=== Sukapha in Assam ===
Sukapha came into Assam not as a raiding conqueror but as a head of an agriculture folk in search of land. It appear he didn't encroach upon the land of peasants, rather he opened up new areas for settlement, procuring with shrewd diplomacy what he direly needed for the purpose- the service of the local inhabitants: Come and have mutual introduction with us.You are the host, the natives of this land: we are guests coming from an up-country. You should introduce to us the local people. His appeal had the desired effect and the tribes were subsequently won over. Sukapha moved and lived amongst the tribesman, learnt their languages, honoured their religious rites, married their daughters and led a simple life of a commoner, himself cultivating in the land. He accepted them to his social fold, placed them on equal footing with his own men and treated them as his friends.

=== Establishment of Ahom Kingdom ===
Over the next few years, he moved from place to place searching for the right capital, leaving behind his representative at each stage to rule the colonised land. Then he went up the Burhidihing River and established a province at Lakhen Telsa. Then he came back down the river and established his rule at Tipam. In 1236 he moved to Mungklang (Abhoipur), and in 1240 down the Brahmaputra to Habung. In 1244 he went further down to Ligirigaon (Song-Tak), a few miles from present-day Nazira, and in 1246 to Simaluguri (Tun Nyeu), a place downstream from the present-day Simaluguri. Finally in 1253 he built himself his capital city at Charaideo near present-day Sibsagar town. The capital of the Ahom kingdom changed many times after this, but Charaideo remained the symbolic center of Ahom rule.

With the help of local recruits, he established three large farms for sali rice cultivation, called Barakhowakhat, Engerakhat and Gachikalakhat.

In 1268 Sukapha died. At the time of his death, his kingdom was bounded by the Brahmaputra River in the west, the Disang River in the north, the Dikhow River (26°58′15″N 94°38′12″E) in the south and the Naga Hills in the east.

Even though Sukapha treated the people of the Patkai hills very severely on his way to the Brahmaputra valley, his approach to the population in Assam was conciliatory and non-confrontational. He married the daughters of Badaucha, the Moran Chief and Thakumatha, the Barahi chief and established cordial relations with them. As he began establishing his domain, he avoided regions that were heavily populated. He encouraged his soldiers as well as members of the Ahom elite to marry locally. A process of Ahomisation (whereby locals who adopted Ahom methods of wet rice cultivation and statecraft were accepted into the Ahom fold) bolstered the process of integration. The local Borahi and the Moran people, speakers of Tibeto-Burman languages, addressed Sukapha's people as "Ha-Cham", that later on developed into "Assam" or "Ahom" (see Etymology of Assam), the name of the kingdom; and "Ahom", the name of the people.

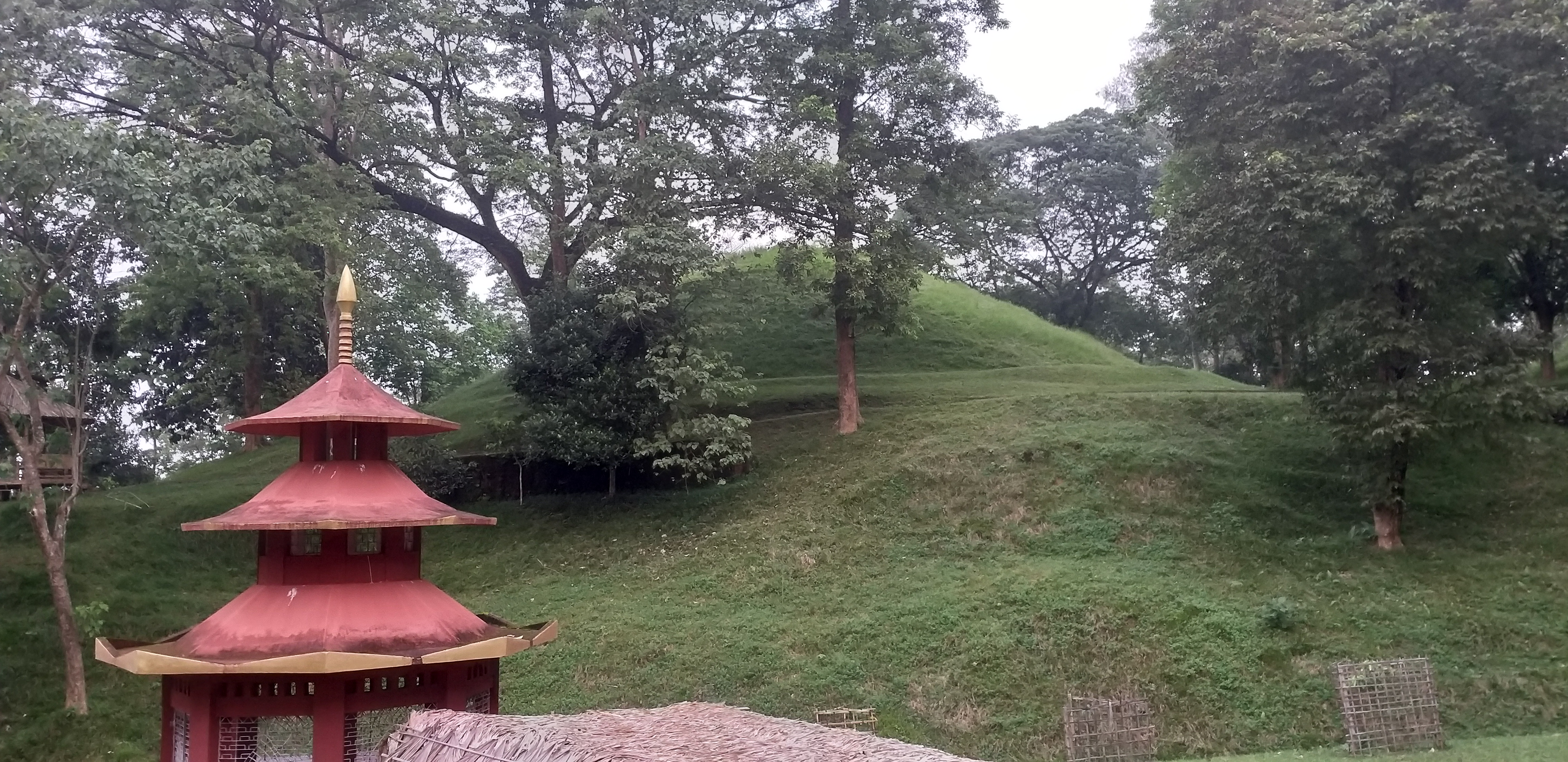
Charaideo Maidams – UNESCO World Heritage Site ,Assam

=== Memorial ===
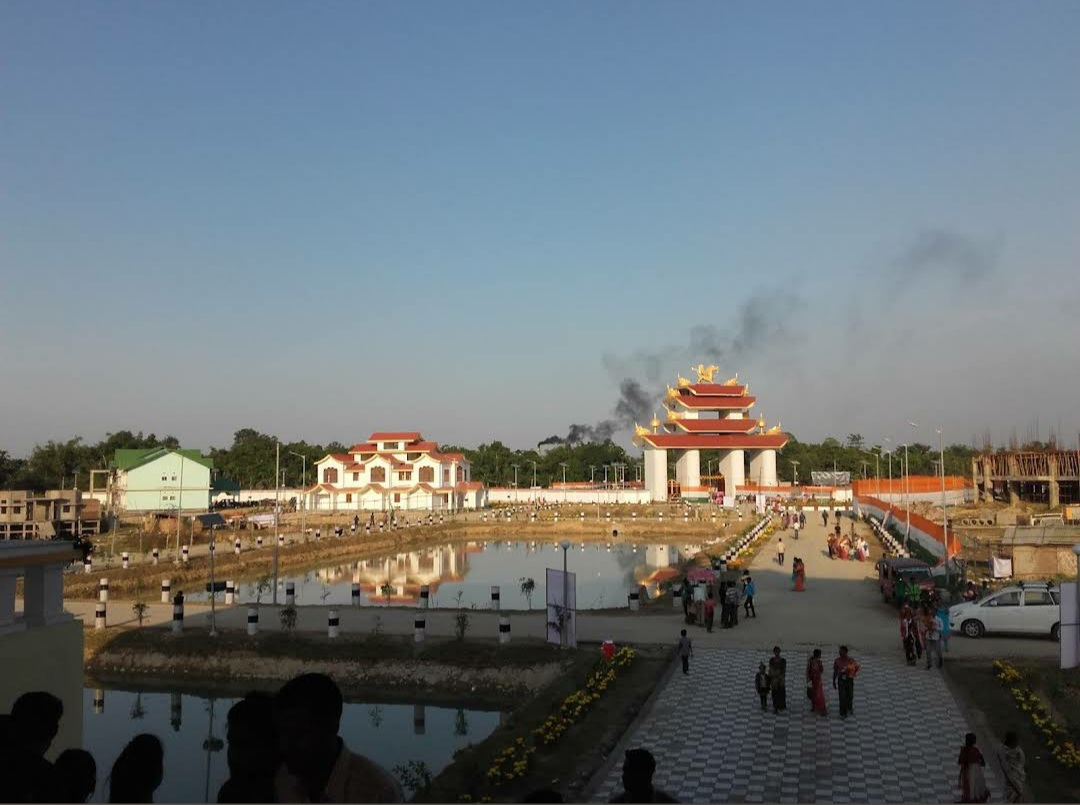
Su-Ka-Pha Samanway Kshetra, Jorhat, Assam

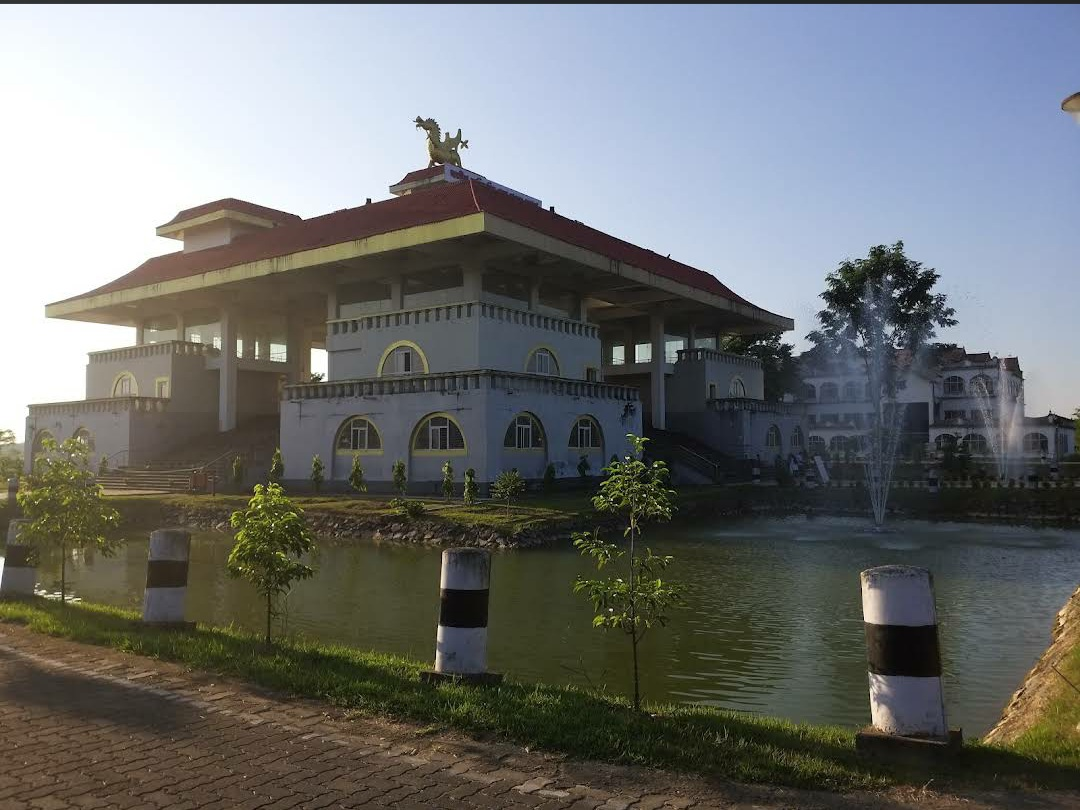
Su-Ka-Pha Samanway Kshetra, Jorhat, Assam

- On 2 December, Assam celebrates the Sukapha Divas, or Asom Divas (Assam Day). An award is given by State Government that day to a prominent personality.
- Sukapha Samanway Kshetra (26°42′58″N 94°04′42″E) : Inaugurated on 2 December 2015, at Mohbondha, Jorhat.
- A 100-feet long statue of Chaolung Siu Ka Pha was unveiled in Nazira, Assam on 26 February 2021 by Assam Health, Finance and Education Minister Dr. Himanta Biswa Sarma. It stirred controversy because of its "weird looking" face.
- Sukapha Bhawan at Khanapara, Guwahati (26°07′32″N 91°48′13″E)
- Sukapha Bhawan at Borbaruah, Dibrugarh. (27°20′49″N 94°51′57″E)
- A cruise in the name of RV Sukafa plying on Brahmaputra.

== See also ==
- Ahom Dynasty
- Ahom kingdom
- Kingdom of Pong
