= Izzatullah Bengali =

18th-century writer

Shaykh Izzatullah ইজ্জতুল্লাহ বাঙ্গালী عزّت‌الله بنگالی Bengali
- Born: 17th century Murshidabad, Bengal Subah, Mughal Empire
- Died: 18th century Murshidabad, Bengal Presidency, British India
- Occupation: Writer
- Writing career
- Language: Bengali, Persian
- Notable work: Taj al-Mulk Gul-e-Bakawali

Izzatullah Bengali (Bengali: ইজ্জতুল্লাহ বাঙ্গালী, Persian: عزّت‌الله بنگالی) was an 18th-century Bengali author who wrote in the Persian language.

== Biography ==
Izzatullah Bengali was from Murshidabad, the erstwhile capital of the Bengal Subah. At the time, the Persian language was the official language in Bengal and other parts of South Asia. After coming across Taj al-Mulk Gul-e-Bakawali, a popular Hindustani story, and narrating it to his friend Nazar Muhammad, Izzatullah wrote the story in Persian for his friend in 1722.

A manuscript of his work is located at the University of Dhaka library. In 1803, his work was translated into Urdu by Munshi Nihal Chand Lahori of Fort William College with the title Mazhab-e-Ishq (Religion of Love).
