= Ahom people =

Ethnic group from Assam

Tai Ahom
tái ahüm
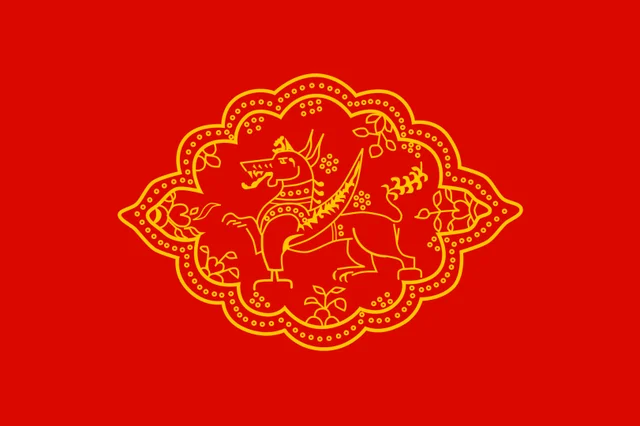

Regions with significant populations
- Assam: unknown
- Arunachal Pradesh: unknown

Languages
- Assamese (majority), and Ahom (used mainly for religious and educational purposes.)

Religion
- Majority: Hinduism; Minority: Ahom religion

Related ethnic groups
- other Tai peoples, Morans, Chutias, Bodo-Kachari peoples

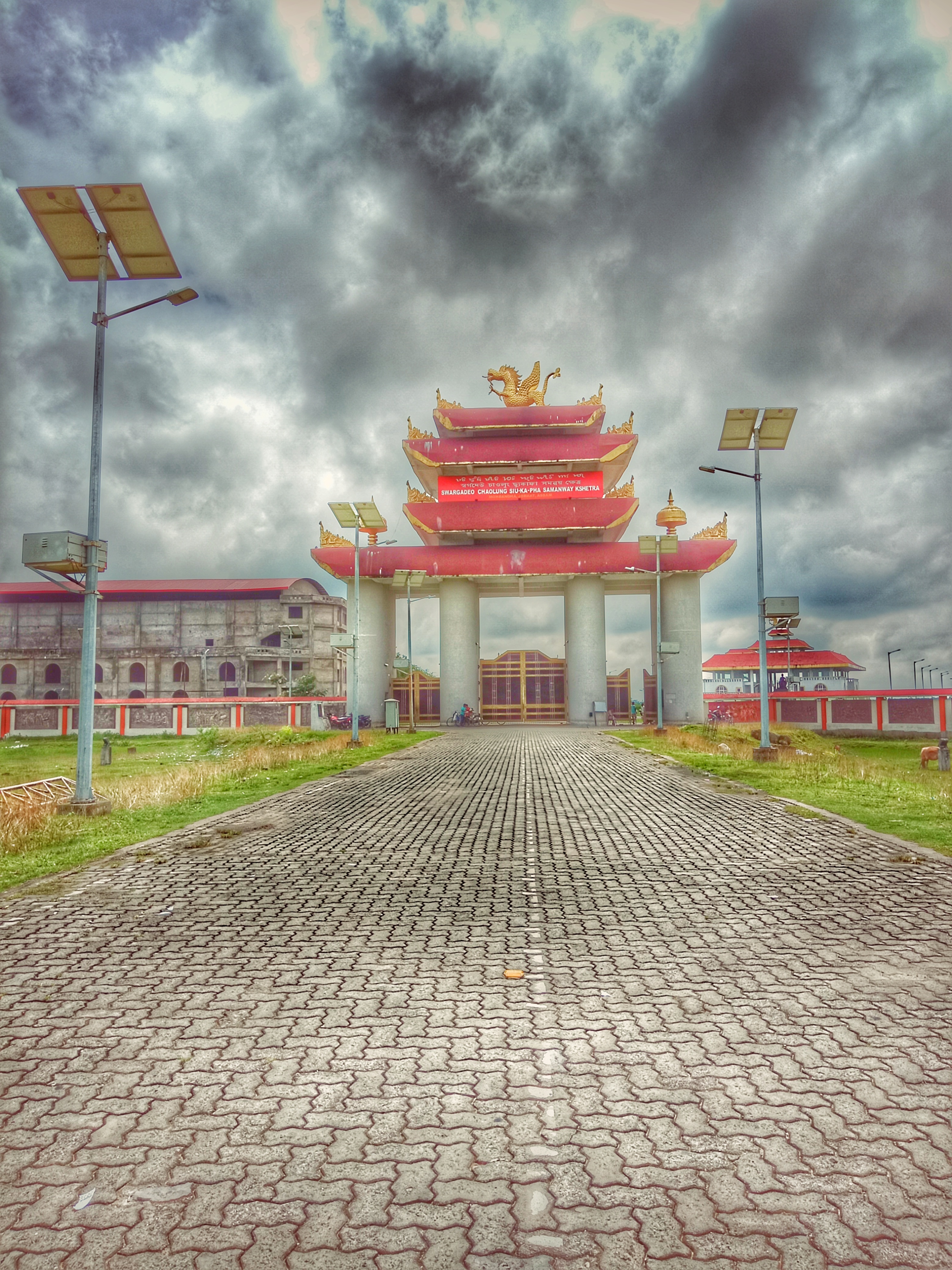
Sukapha Kshetra entrance.

The Ahom (/ˈɑːhɒm/) or Tai Ahom (Ahom: 𑜄𑜩 𑜒𑜑𑜪𑜨; Assamese: টাই-আহোম) is a South Asian ethnic group living primarily in Assam and Arunachal Pradesh of the modern Northeast India. They are the admixed descendants of Tai peoples who migrated into the Brahmaputra Valley, and of indigenous populations incorporated into their society via Ahomisation. According to traditional accounts, the Tai group arrived in 1228 under the leadership of Sukaphaa, with the Ahom kingdom founded that year. Over the following centuries, the kingdom expanded across much of the Brahmaputra Valley in present-day Assam and endured until the signing of the Treaty of Yandabo in 1826.

The modern Ahom people and their culture are a syncretism of Tai and local Tibeto-Burman speakers.

== Etymology ==
The name Ahom is an exonym; the people referred to themselves as Tai. Banikanta Kakati notes that the Tai migrants who entered the Brahmaputra valley came to be called Asam, Āsām and Ācām by the indigenous population, and derives the modern Assamese ethnonym Ahom through the development Āsām → Asam → Aham → Ahom. Kakati further relates the element -sām to Sham/Shan or Syam, an old external designation for Tai peoples. (Note: The designation long predates the arrival of Sukaphaa's followers in the Brahmaputra valley. Michel Ferlus traces secure epigraphic occurrences of syam referring to Tai populations to the eleventh century and notes numerous Pagan-period occurrences from 1120 onward, where the term generally designated the Tai peoples of northeastern Burma, later known collectively as Shan. Ferlus considers Siam, Shan and Ahom to be forms sharing the same historical origin. Thus the use of a form related to Syam/Sham for the Tai newcomers in the Brahmaputra valley belonged to a much older regional practice of neighbouring peoples designating Tai populations by this ethnonym rather than representing a name coined by the Ahoms themselves.)

== History ==
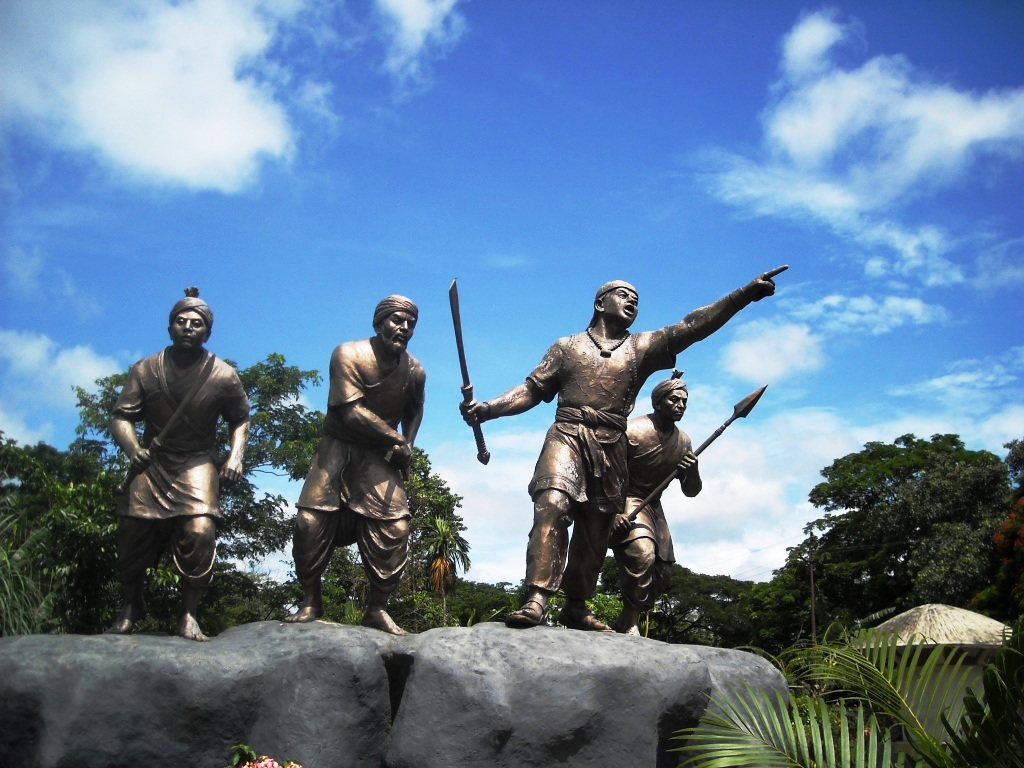
Statue of Ahom warriors near Sivasagar town, Assam

=== Origins ===
The Tai speaking people came into prominence first in the Guangxi region, in China, from where they moved to mainland Southeast Asia in the middle of the 11th century after a long and fierce battle with the Northern Han Chinese. The Tai Ahoms are traced to either Mong Mao, (present-day Dehong, Yunnan) of South China or to the Hukawng Valley in Myanmar.

According to the traditional chronology, Sukaphaa, a Tai prince from Mong Mao, entered Assam in 1228 with a group of followers intending to establish a permanent settlement. They are traditionally believed to have brought techniques of wet-rice cultivation, a system of writing and record-keeping, and traditions of state formation. Recent scholarship has, however, questioned this chronology, proposing that the Ahom polity may instead have been founded in the mid-14th century. Linguistic research has likewise suggested the development of Ahom script as between the late 14th century and the 16th century. Scholars have further argued from pre-Ahom inscriptional and Buranji evidence that settled agriculture, wet-rice cultivation and embankment-based water management had important antecedents in Assam before the Ahom entry and that groups like the Kacharis already practised wet-rice cultivation when the Ahoms settled in Assam. The migrant group eventually settled in the region south of the Brahmaputra River and to the east of the Dikhow River, and established the Ahom kingdom, which over the following centuries, expanded across much of the Brahmaputra Valley until 1826. The Ahom still live in this region as of 1996.

=== Initial formation in Assam ===
The followers of Sukaphaa moved about for nearly thirty years and mixed with the local population. He moved from place to place, searching for a seat. He made peace with the Borahi and Moran ethnic groups, and he and his mostly male followers married into them, creating an admixed population identified as Ahoms and initiating the process of Ahomisation. The Borahis, a Tibeto-Burman people, were completely subsumed into the Ahom fold, though the Moran maintained their independent ethnicity. Sukaphaa established his capital at Charaideo near present-day Sivasagar.

=== Ahomisation ===
The Ahoms believed that they were divinely ordained to cultivate fallow land with their techniques of wet-rice cultivation, and to bring stateless peoples into their civilisation. They were also conscious of their numerical minority. As the Ahom migrated to Assam, members of the army took wives from non-Tai-speaking populations which they encountered. As a result, the Ahom polity initially absorbed Naga, Borahi and Moran, and later large sections of the Chutia and the Dimasa-Kachari peoples. This process of Ahomisation went on until the mid-16th century, when the Ahom society itself came under direct Hindu influence. The Buranjis record the ceremonial adoption of indigenous peoples into Ahom clans. Since the Ahoms married outside their own clans and since their own traditional religion resembled the religious practices of the indigenous peoples, the assimilation under Ahomisation had little impediment.

=== Genetic evidence ===
Genetic studies support a substantial contribution from local Northeast Indian populations to the ancestry of modern Ahoms. Earlier studies of paternal ancestry markers identified the East and Southeast Asian Y-chromosome haplogroup O3-M134 (O-M134 in current nomenclature) as the most frequent paternal haplogroup among modern Ahoms. O-M134 and its downstream paternal lineages are particularly frequent among several Tibeto-Burman populations of Northeast India, including a number of Boro–Garo-speaking groups such as the Kachari, Boro (Mech), Rabha and Tripuri. (Note: Earlier studies reported O-M134 in 85% of sampled males identified as Kachari and 76% of Rabha males. Higher-resolution Y-chromosome analysis subsequently found the downstream O-M117 lineage, a subgroup of O-M134, in 57.7% of sampled Rabha males and 47.4% of sampled Mech males. High frequencies of O-M134 were also reported among the Boro–Garo-speaking Tripuri (17 of 21 males; 81.0%) and Jamatia (22 of 30; 73.3%) samples from Tripura. Among the Garo, O-M134 was reported in 23% of sampled males, together with the related downstream O-M133 lineage. The lineage is likewise frequent among other Tibeto-Burman populations of Northeast India: Cordaux et al. (2004) found O-M134 in 85.5% of a combined sample of Adi, Apatani, Nishi and Naga males, with frequencies ranging from 76% to 94% among the individual populations.)

A 2024 genome-wide study found that modern Ahoms possess substantial South Asian, Trans-Himalayan and other East/Southeast Asian-related ancestry. The authors inferred that the Trans-Himalayan and Indian Tibeto-Burman-related components were acquired after migration into India and concluded that the relatively small ancestral migrant population had lost much of its original homeland ancestry through extensive admixture with local populations. Haplotype-based analyses also showed especially strong affinities with Kusunda, Khasi and Nyishi populations, and the authors found that the sampled Ahoms received more shared genetic segments from Indo-Tibeto-Burman populations than from the comparison populations. They further noted that larger-scale analyses of Y chromosomes among modern Ahoms would be required to identify rarer paternal haplogroups associated with their ancestral homeland, while similarly expanded mitochondrial-DNA sampling would be required to investigate maternal lineages.

=== Localisation and Loss ===
In the 16th and 17th centuries, the small Ahom community expanded its rule westward and successfully repelled the Mughals. This rapid expansion resulted in the Ahom people becoming a small minority in their own kingdom, of which they kept control. Eventually, the Ahom court, as well as the Ahom peasants, took to Ekasarana dharma, Shaktism and Saivism over the traditional Ahom religion. The traditional Ahom religion is also nearly extinct, with only a few priestly families practising some aspects of it. The modern Ahom people and their culture are a syncretism of the original Tai and their culture and local Tibeto-Burman peoples and their cultures they absorbed in Assam.

The traditional black attire of Tai-ahom women.

The everyday usage of the Ahom language ceased completely by the early 19th century. They also adopted Assamese over the Ahom language for secular purposes. As a result of the Ahom army being composed of a large number of non-Ahom, Assamese was used as a lingua franca among troops. While the written language (and ritualistic chants) survive in a vast number of written manuscripts, much of the spoken language is lost because the Ahom script does not mark tone and under-specifies vowel contrasts.

=== Revivalism ===
The first political organisation of the Ahoms, the "All Assam Ahom Association", was established in 1893. During the first half of the twentieth century, Ahom identity became increasingly associated with organised political mobilisation. Saikia argues that colonial classification altered the meaning of "Ahom": under British rule, the Ahoms were incorporated within the broader Assamese category, distinguished from groups classified as "tribal", while colonial scholarship also represented the Tai-Ahoms as a homogeneous community with a common culture and society. She further characterises the codification of "Ahom" and "Assamese" as a colonial classificatory process that later provided categories for twentieth-century identity politics.

Since the 1930s, Ahoms began seeking for more political independence; they opposed their classification as Hindus in India's proposed 1941 census, demanding a separate electoral constituency, recognition as a racial minority community, and as a scheduled tribe. They also sought to distinguish Ahoms from caste-Hindu Assamese and proposed links with the Shan states beyond the Patkai in Burma.

A formal connection with other Tai groups of Assam was established in 1954 through the Tai Historical and Cultural Society at Patsaku, which associated the Ahoms with the Khamti, Khamyang, Phakey and Aiton. The movement gained renewed attention during the reorganisation of Assam in the 1960s. Saikia argues that the growing use of "Tai-Ahom" narrowed the earlier, more fluid meaning of Ahom and linked the community more explicitly with the Tai peoples of Southeast Asia.

== Society ==
=== Ban-Mong Social system ===
The Tai Ahom people's traditional social structure, called Ban-Mong, revolved around agriculture and centred on irrigation methods. The Ban or Ban Na is a unit composed of families that settled by the side of the rivers. Many Bans together form a Mong, which refers state.

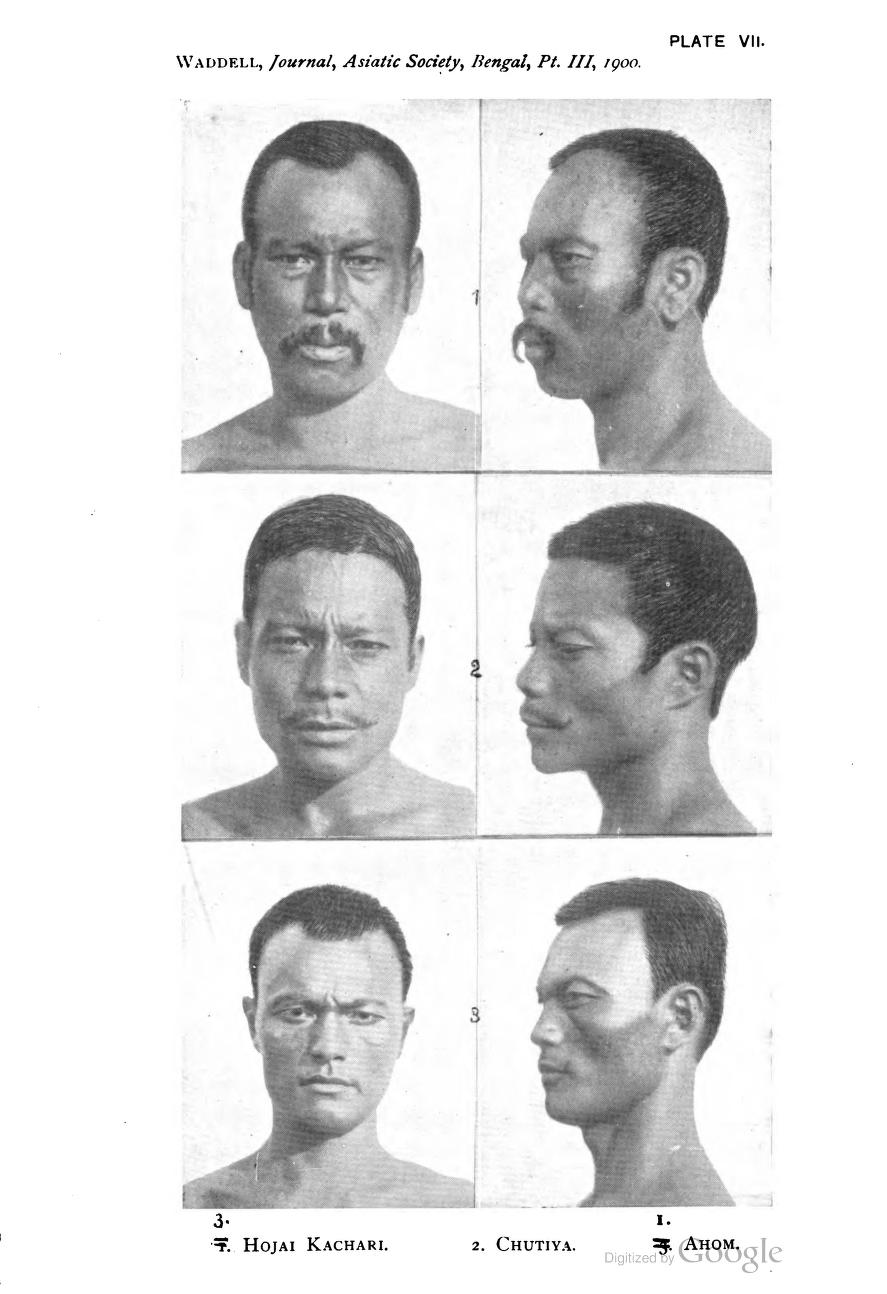
Photo from 1900 showing the typical face of an Ahom man(top).

=== Ahom clans ===
Ahom clans, called phoids, formed socio-political entities. At the time of ingress into Assam, or soon thereafter, there were seven important clans, called Satghariya Ahoms (Ahoms of the Seven Houses). There were Su/Tsu (Tiger) clan to which the Chao-Pha (Sukaphaa) belonged; his two chief counselors Burhagohain (Chao-Phrung-Mung) and Borgohain (Chao-Thao-Mung); and three priestly clans: Bailung (Mo-plang), Deodhai (Mo-sham), Mohan (Mo-hang) and Siring. Soon the Satghariya group was expanded—four additional clans began to be associated with nobility: Dihingia, Sandikoi, Lahon and Duarah. In the 16th-century Suhungmung added another great counselor, the Borpatrogohain and a new clan was established. Over time sub-clans began appearing. Thus, during the Suhungmung's reign, the Chao-Pha's clan were divided into seven sub-clans—Saringiya, Tipamiya, Dihingiya, Samuguriya, Tungkhungiya, Parvatiya, and Namrupiya. Similarly, Burhagohain clan were divided into eight, Borgohain sixteen, Deodhai twelve, Mohan seven, and Bailung and Siring eight each. The rest of the Ahom gentry belonged to clans such as Chaodangs, Gharphalias, Likchows etc. In general, the secular aristocratic clans, the priestly class, and the gentry clans did not intermarry.

Some clans admitted people from other ethnic groups as well. For example, Miri-Sandikoi and Moran-Patar were Sandikoi and Patar from the Mising and Moran communities, while the founders of Chetias and Lahons were from the Chutia community. This was true even for the priestly clans: Naga-Bailung, Miri-Bailung and Nara-Bailung.

== Culture ==
=== Clothing ===
The early Ahoms traditionally wore black clothing. Lila Gogoi notes that the Ahoms formerly dressed in black and later abandoned it in favour of white clothing; he compares their earlier dress with that of related Khamti, Phakial and Shan communities, among whom black clothing continued to be used. (Note: The Buranjis preserve similar descriptions. The Assam Buranji describes the Ahoms in accounts concerning the sixteenth century as “Lunda-Munda Kula Kapur pindha luk” ("black-clothed bald men") and “Kolia bastra paridhan kora” ("dressed in black clothing"). A study of Tai-Ahom dress similarly describes the earlier costume as including black pot-lung (trousers), pha-sin (a lower wrap), kun-bin and kun-kha, with a cloth called pha-siu used as head-covering.) The character of Ahom dress changed considerably with the expansion of the kingdom and its interaction with the populations of the Brahmaputra valley. According to the Naoboicha Phukanar Buranji, an Ahom king, acting on the advice of his ministers, introduced the use of muga and paat silk at the royal court and employed a thousand muga rearers and weavers from the Chutia community to manufacture royal garments at the capital. (Note: The account is significant as a Buranji tradition concerning a transition in court dress; it presents muga and paat garments as a later introduction into the Ahom royal establishment rather than part of the original dress of the Tai migrants.)

By the later Ahom period, dress had become closely associated with rank. Royal and aristocratic garments were made from fine varieties of silk, including muga, paat, gomseng and mejankari, while particular garments, fabrics and forms of ornamentation were restricted according to social status.

=== Festivals ===
==== Me-dam-me-phi ====
Me-dam-me-phi is the communal ancestor worship festival of Tai Ahom. It was observed in the month of Duin-Ha (March and April) in ancient times, and celebrated on 31 January in modern day.

==== Poi cheng ken ====
Poi cheng ken is the traditional spring festival of the Tai Ahom people, celebrated during the Ahom month of Duin-Ha in the Sexagenary cycle. The festival includes rituals such as washing, particularly bathing household cattle, honoring ancestors, and worshipping the insignia Chum Pha Rueng Sheng Mueang. The customs of Cheng Ken are documented in the ancient manuscript Khyek Lai Bet. As stated:

Duin ha jao pai ka duin ruk Poi cheng ken ao ma, hu ap nam, khai ap nam...., lit. ''the month of Duin-ha is over. Poi cheng ken arrives in Duin-ruk. Cows and buffaloes are bathed in water.'

=== Housing ===
The houses of rural Ahom families have been made of wood and bamboo, and two roofs are typically thatched. Families' orchards and ploughed fields are near their house. Houses are built in a scattered fashion within bamboo groves. The Ahom have built their house on stilts called Rwan Huan about two meters above ground level.

=== Cuisine ===
Most Ahoms, particularly in rural areas, are non-vegetarian, maintaining a traditional cuisine similar to other Tai people. Rice is a staple food, and dishes may encompass pork, poultry, and slices of beef; frogs, fresh fish, and Hukoti maas (dry preserved fish mixture); Muga leta (cocoon seeds of endi and muga worms), and eggs of red ants. Certain insects are also popular foods for the Ahoms. Luk-Lao or Nam-Lao (rice beer, undiluted or diluted) are traditional drinks. They consume Khar (a form of alkaline liquid extracted from the ashes of burned banana peels/bark), Betgaaj (tender cane shoots), and many other naturally grown herbs with medicinal properties. General Hindus avoid beef, and Vaisnavites avoid pork. During Siva Singha's reign, the people abandoned the free use of meat and drinks.

The Ahoms prefer boiled food that have little spices and directly burnt fish, meat and vegetables like brinjal, tomato, etc. Some of them are Thu–dam (black lentil), Khao–Moon (Rice Frumenty), Xandohguri (a powder made from dry roasted rice), ChewaKhao (steamed rice), Chunga Chaul (sticky rice cooked in tender bamboo tubes), Til pitha (sesame rice rolls prepared from sticky rice powder), and Khao-tyek (rice flakes). Khao (unboiled soft rice prepared from a special variety of sticky rice with a unique technique), Tupula Khao (a kind of rice cooked and packed with tora pat, a fragrant plant leaf, and preserved bamboo sauce are some of the favourite food items of the Ahoms, which are similar to their traditional diet.

=== Wedding ===
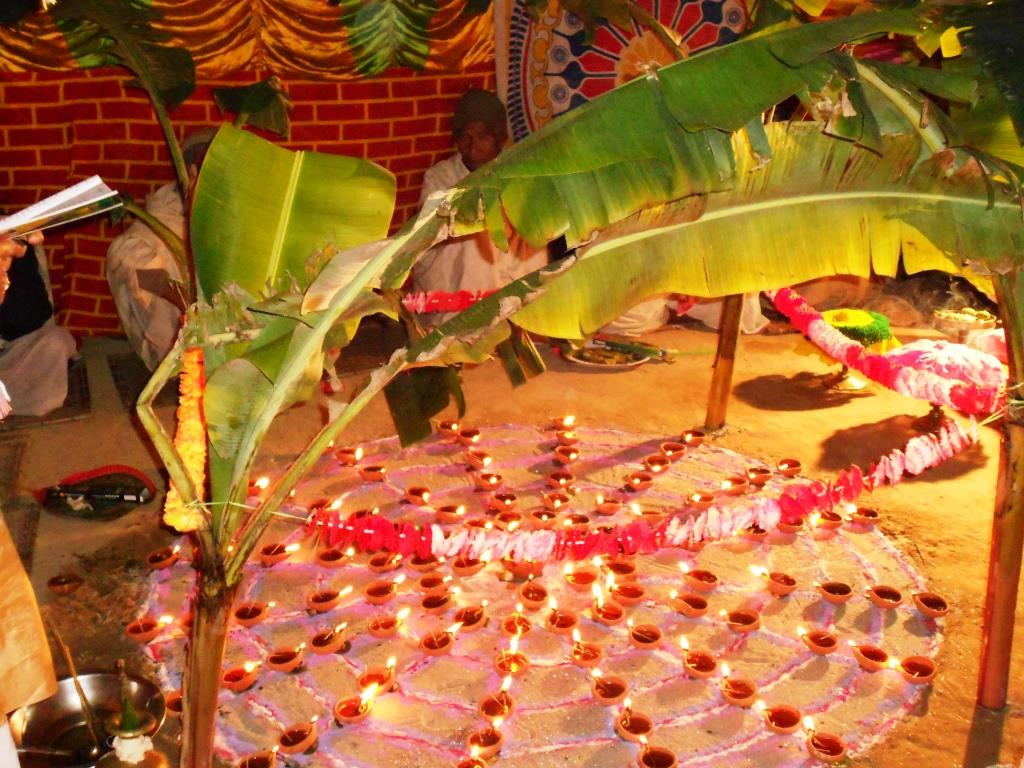
Cho-klong

Cho Klong is the main marriage ritual among the twenty marriage rituals of Tai Ahom people. The name Cho Klong is derived from the Tai Ahom language Cho ('to combine'), and klong ('ritual'). The ritual is described in an ancient Tai Ahom script Lai Lit nang Hoon Pha. 101 ban-phai-s (earthen lamps) or lights are lit. The bride offers the groom a heng-dan (sword) to protect her, their children, family, race and country. A total of twenty rituals are performed in Ahom weddings along with cho klong, including:

- Juron
- Rik-Khwan
- Aap-Tang [Aap=Bath, Tang=devine]
- Chow Ban [worshipping sun]
- Jon-ming [Blessing given by Moloung priests]

== Religion ==
Most Ahoms are Hindus, although revival organisations have sought to restore the Ahom religion. Hinduisation accelerated during the reign of Jayadhwaj Singha, who in 1654 became the first Ahom king to receive formal Vaishnava initiation, from Niranjan Bapu, the first satradhikar of the Auniati Satra. Thereafter, Vaishnavism expanded rapidly among the Ahoms through the satras, bringing significant changes in their religious life. Royal adherence was nevertheless not uniform: Chakradhwaj Singha revived traditional Ahom worship, while Gadadhar Singha followed the ancestral religion despite being favourably disposed towards Tantric Hinduism.

Brahmanical influence increased further in the late seventeenth and eighteenth centuries. According to Gogoi, the later Ahom kings after Rudra Singha and the chief nobles adhered to the Sakta cult and performed state ceremonies of Sakti worship, while continuing the traditional worship of Ahom deities at Charaideo. Siva Singha became a prominent Sakta ruler and patronised temples dedicated to Siva and Sakti; Saikia describes his reign as one in which Brahmanism was promoted as a state religion and older Tai-Ahom practices that conflicted with it were increasingly suppressed.

Hindu influence also transformed Ahom mortuary customs, with cremation increasingly replacing the traditional practice of burial. (Note: The sources differ on the precise stage at which this transition was imposed. Gogoi attributes the enforcement of cremation among the Ahoms to Bar-Raja Phuleswari, the wife of Siva Singha. Saikia, however, states that Rudra Singha had earlier ordered Ahom kings to be cremated according to Hindu custom while permitting a simulated burial of royal articles at Charaideo; she also notes that burial was not completely abandoned.) Nevertheless, Me-Dam-Me-Phi, the communal ancestor-worship festival, continues to be widely celebrated and is now observed annually on 31 January.

== Language ==
The Ahoms have used the Assamese language since the Ahom language ceased to be used as a vernacular language. The Ahom language, a member of the Tai branch of the Kra–Dai languages, is dead, and its tone system is completely lost. Nevertheless, it is being revived by some Tai Ahom organisations.

From the latter part of the 20th century through the early 21st century, there has been a resurgence of interest among the Ahoms in their culture and language, resulting in heightened scholarly focus and efforts towards revival. The 1901 census of India enumerated approximately 179,000 people identifying as Ahom. The latest available census records slightly over 2 million Ahom individuals; however, estimates of the total number of people descended from the original Tai Ahom settlers are as high as eight million. The Ahom script was added to the Unicode Consortium.

=== Literature ===
The Ahom script fell into disuse along with the language. The writing system had evolved from an earlier script of the Tai Nuea language, which developed further under the Chinese government. A large corpus of manuscripts in the script on history, society, astrology, rituals, etc., known as Buranji has survived. The priestly classes (Mo'sam, Mo'hung, Mo'Plong) are the custodians of these manuscripts.

The Ahom people used to use the Lak-Ni Tao-Si-Nga, a lunar calendar from China that remains in use there and among Tai people of South-East Asia. It has 12 months and an additional leap month with a ten-day weekly cycle. The first month is called Duin-Shing, whose Gregorian equivalent is November–December, and the new year festival is known as Pi-Mau Tai. The events in Buranji were counted with Lak-ni.

== Ahom people today ==
Ahom people today are today categorised in the other backward classes (OBC) caste category; there is longstanding discussion and demand for Scheduled Tribe status. The demand for Scheduled Tribe recognition has also been an important component of modern Tai-Ahom identity politics. Saikia (2004) identifies Scheduled Tribe status, access to associated economic and political benefits, reserved electoral representation, and claims over land and resources in Upper Assam among the objectives articulated by participants in the movement.

The term "ethnic Assamese" is now associated by the Indian government with the various indigenous Assamese people. Historian Yasmin Saikia distinguishes the modern ethnic conception of the Ahoms from the use of the category in pre-colonial Assam. She contends that during pre-colonial eras, the Ahoms did not constitute an ethnic community; instead, they formed a relatively inclusive social group. Any group entering the socio-economic framework of the Ahom state could acquire Ahom status, subject to the explicit approval of the king. (Note: Saikia argues that in pre-colonial Assam, being Ahom was an acquired status rather than a condition fixed by birth. She notes that individuals of non-Ahom backgrounds could enter the Ahom administrative elite through service, appointment and royal favour. In her reading, ethnicity was not the determining factor in becoming Ahom; rather, the favour of the swargadeo was decisive, and the composition of the Ahom nobility consequently varied under different rulers. She describes the Ahom officials as a heterogeneous body selected and brought together by royal mandate to assist in governing the kingdom. Ahom status was also not necessarily permanent, since the swargadeo could elevate or demote individuals and thereby alter their social identity.) She further contrasts this fluid pre-colonial category with the colonial period, when "Ahom" was transformed from what she calls a "fluid, official position" into a hereditary group identity and ethnicity.

== Notable people ==
- Krishna Kanta Handique – Sanskrit scholar, indologist, philanthropist, educationist, recipient of Padma Shri and Padma Bhushan
- Ganesh Gogoi – Poet
- Hiteswar Saikia – 10th Chief Minister of Assam
- Tarun Gogoi – 13th Chief Minister of Assam
- Gomdhar Konwar – Ahom prince and early freedom fighter
- Devanand Konwar – Former Governor of Tripura, Bihar, and West Bengal
- Kushal Konwar – Freedom fighter, died during the Quit India Movement
- Gaurav Gogoi – Deputy Leader of the Opposition in the Lok Sabha
- Lachit Borphukan – Commander of the Ahom Army, victor of the Battle of Saraighat (1671)
- Lovlina Borgohain – Athlete and Olympian
- Homen Borgohain – Writer and journalist
- Jahnu Barua – Film director
- Padmanath Gohain Baruah – First president of Asam Sahitya Sabha
- Jatindra Nath Duwara – Poet and author
- Dip Gogoi – Politician from Assam
- Lila Gogoi – Historian and author
- Ranjan Gogoi – 46th Chief Justice of India
- Anjan Gogoi – Air marshal, served as Air Officer Commanding-in-Chief (AOC-in-C) of the South Western Air Command
- Hiren Gohain – Scholar and political commentator
- Akhil Gogoi – Social activist and politician
- Pabitra Margherita – Actor and politician

== See also ==
- Ahom Dynasty
- Ahom history
- All Tai Ahom Students Union
- Assamese people
- Hengdang

== Bibliography ==
- Gogoi, Shrutashwinee (2011). Tai ahom religion a philosophical study (PhD). hdl:10603/116167.
- Baruah, S. L. (1977). "Ahom Policy Towards the Neighbouring Hill Tribes". Proceedings of the Indian History Congress. 38: 249–256. JSTOR 44139078.
- Dutta, Sristidhar (1985), The Mataks and their Kingdom, Allahabad: Chugh Publications
- Kumar, Vikrant; Basu, Debashis; Reddy, B Mohan (2004). "Genetic Heterogeneity in Northeastern India: Reflection of Tribe–Caste Continuum in the Genetic Structure". American Journal of Human Biology. 16 (3): 334–345. doi:10.1002/ajhb.20027. PMID 15101058. S2CID 22571529.
- Gogoi, Nitul Kumar (2006), Continuity and Change among the Ahoms, Concept Publishing Company, Delhi
- Daniels, Christian (October 2023). "When did the Ahom Migrate to Assam?". Indian Journal of Tai Studies. XXIII. Institute of Tai Studies and Research.
- Gogoi, Poppy; Morey, Stephen; Pittayaporn, Pittayawat (2020). "The Tai Ahom sound system as reflected by the texts recorded in the bark manuscripts". Journal of the Southeast Asian Linguistics Society. 13 (2). University of Hawaiʻi Press: 14–42. hdl:10524/52468.
- Gogoi, Nitul Kumar (1995). Acculturation in the Brahmaputra Valley: the Ahom Case (PhD). hdl:10603/66134.
- Gogoi, Padmeshwar (1976), Tai Ahom Religion and Customs, Publication Board, Gauhati, Assam
- Guha, Amalendu (December 1983), "The Ahom Political System: An Enquiry into the State Formation Process in Medieval Assam (1228–1714)", Social Scientist, 11 (12): 3–34, doi:10.2307/3516963, JSTOR 3516963, archived from the original on 6 July 2023
- Guha, Amalendu (June 1984). "Pre-Ahom Roots and the Medieval State in Assam: A Reply". Social Scientist. 12 (6): 70–77. doi:10.2307/3517005. JSTOR 3517005.
- Marwah, Reena (2020). Reimagining India-Thailand Relations: A Multilateral And Bilateral Perspective. World Scientific. ISBN 978-981-12-1205-5.
- Morey, Stephen (2014), "Ahom and Tangsa: Case studies of language maintenance and loss in North East India", in Cardoso, Hugo C. (ed.), Language Endangerment and Preservation in South Asia, Honolulu: University of Hawaiʻi Press, pp. 46–77
- Phukan, J N (1991). "Relations of the Ahom Kings of Assam with Those of Mong Mao (in Yunnan, China) and of Mong Kwang (Mogaung in Myanmar)". Proceedings of the Indian History Congress. 52: 888–893. JSTOR 44142722.
- Terwiel, B.J. (1996). "Recreating the Past: Revivalism in Northeastern India". Bijdragen tot de Taal-, Land- en Volkenkunde. 152 (2): 275–92. doi:10.1163/22134379-90003014. JSTOR 27864746.
- Phukan, Dr. Girin (2017), Cultural Linkage of the Ahom with the Tais of Southeast Asia: A case study of Ahom— Thai Linkage, vol. I, II, IV, Khwan Mung Magazine
- Kapoor, Ramesh (2021), "Fixing the chronology in Tai-Ahom chronicles by using astronomical references", Journal of Astronomical History and Heritage, 24 (3): 665–687, doi:10.3724/SP.J.1440-2807.2021.03.07
- Phukan Baruah, B. N.N. (1964). Ahom lexicon. The Government of Assam in the Department of Historical and antiquarian studies.
- Lahiri, Nayanjot (1984). "The Pre-Ahom Roots of Medieval Assam". Social Scientist. 12 (6): 60–69. doi:10.2307/3517004. JSTOR 3517004.
- Boruah, Nirode (2013). "Cultivable Lands and Land Measurement in Early Assam" (PDF). Social Science Journal of Gargaon College. 1: 5–12.
- Saikia, Yasmin (1997). In the Meadows of Gold: Telling Tales of the Swargadeos at the Crossroads of Assam. Guwahati: Spectrum Publications.
- Saikia, Mrigakhee (2021). "Archaeological Remains of the Kapili–Jamuna Valley of Assam". Abhidha Journal of Art, Archaeology and Cultural Heritage. 1 (1): 24–45.
