= Bangala River =

River in Tanzania

Coordinates: 4.847°S 38.368°E

The Bangala is a river of northeastern Tanzania. It is a tributary of the Mkuzu River and is fed by a waterfall named the Soni Falls.
