= Lahkar =

Lahkar is a surname from the state of Assam in North East India.

== History ==
=== Royal house ===
The Ahom kingdom was established in 1228 when Sukaphaa, a Tai prince, entered the Brahmaputra valley after having crossed the rugged Patkai mountain range from Möng Mao. The third Ahom king, Subinphaa, divided the noble Ahoms into seven clans or houses. There are seven royal houses of Ahom, and they were collectively called Satgharia Ahoms (saat meaning seven and ghar meaning house.)

The Satghariya Ahoms (Saat = Seven and Ghar = Royal House) and their sub-clans are as follows:

1. Chaophaa/Swargadeo/Su/Tsu (Tiger) clan (7): (i). Siringiya/Charingiya/Saringiya (ii). Tipamiya (iii). Dihingiya (iv). Samuguriya (v). Tungkhungiya (vi). Parvatiya and (vii). Namrupiya.

2. Burhagohain (8): (i). Tai Ahom (ii). Tai Khamyang (iii). Tai Aiton, (iv). Tai Turung (v). Tai Khamti (vi). Tai Phake (vii). Marangi Khowa Gohain (viii). Sadiya Gohain.

3. Borgohain (16): (i). Sadiya Khowa Gohain (ii). Marangi Khowa Gohain (iii). Bahbaria Gohain (iv). Solal Gohain (v). Kajalimukhiya Gohain (vi). Khamjangia Gohain (vii). Banrukia Gohain (viii). Tungkhungia Gohain (ix). Banlungia Gohain (x). Bhatialia Gohain(xi). Dihingia Gohain (xii). Kaliaboria Gohain (xiii). Jagiyal Gohain (xiv). Mohongia Gohain (xv). Majumelia Gohain (xvi). Sarumelia Gohain.

4. Mohans/Mohong/Mohung (7): (i). Soraimoria, (ii). Khanamukhia (iii). Matighoria (iv). Sengelimoria (v). Rajghoria (vi). Takouboria (vii). Dihingia.

5. Deodhais (12): (i). Bahboria (ii). Kauriklau (goria) (iii). Ba ham ta (iv). Sakoli (v). Che-pet-ta (vi). Mo sa Ita (vii). Kuk- cha (viii). Dangdeng (ix). Hatiborua (x). Dhukla (xi). Khaotek (xii). Mo- ling.

6. Bailungs (18): (i). Oka (ii). Nora (iii). Poka (iv). Khumtai (v). Moupia (vi). Kosuhotia (vii). Mothadongia (viii). Safaguria (ix). Dionia (x). Holguria (xi). Luhotia (xii). Simaluguria (xiii). Lefebara (xiv). Bortotia (xv). Raidongia (xvi). Piraseleka (xvii). Dhak-Chowa (xviii). Pira-kotia.

7. Charing/Chiring/Siring: Subinphaa made the Charing/Chiring/Siring clan the seventh house. It belonged to the Deodhai clan.

Soon the Satghariya group was expanded—four additional clans began to be associated with nobility: Dihingia, Sandikoi, Lahon and Duarah. In the 16th-century, Suhungmung added another great counselor, the Borpatrogohain, and a new clan was established. These were the twelve houses of Ahom called Barahi.

The twelve clans (Barahi) and their sub-clans are as follows:

1. Chaophaa/Swargadeo/Su/Tsu (Tiger) clan (7): (i). Siringiya/Charingiya/Saringiya (ii). Tipamiya (iii). Dihingiya (iv). Samuguriya (v). Tungkhungiya (vi). Parvatiya and (vii). Namrupiya.

2. Burhagohain (8): (i). Tai Ahom (ii). Tai Khamyang (iii). Tai Aiton, (iv). Tai Turung (v). Tai Khamti (vi). Tai Phake (vii). Marangi Khowa Gohain (viii). Sadiya Gohain.

3. Borgohain (16): (i). Sadiya Khowa Gohain (ii). Marangi Khowa Gohain (iii). Bahbaria Gohain (iv). Solal Gohain (v). Kajalimukhiya Gohain (vi). Khamjangia Gohain (vii). Banrukia Gohain (viii). Tungkhungia Gohain (ix). Banlungia Gohain (x). Bhatialia Gohain (xi). Dihingia Gohain (xii). Kaliaboria Gohain (xiii). Jagiyal Gohain (xiv). Mohongia Gohain (xv). Majumelia Gohain (xvi). Sarumelia Gohain.

4. Borpatrogohain: The first appointment was made by King Suhungmung in 1527 AD.

5. Mohans/Mohong/Mohung (6): (i). Soraimoria (ii). Khanamukhia (iii). Matighoria (iv). Sengelimoria (v). Rajghoria (vi). Takouboria.

6. Deodhais (12): (i). Bahboria (ii). Kauriklau (goria) (iii). Ba ham ta (iv). Sakoli (v). Che-pet-ta (vi). Mo sa Ita (vii). Kuk- cha (viii). Dangdeng (ix). Hatiborua (x). Dhukla (xi). Khaotek (xii). Mo- ling.

7. Bailungs (19): (i). Oka (ii). Nora (iii). Luhotia (iv). Poka (v). Khumtai, (vi). Moupia, (vii). Kosuhotia (viii). Mothadongia and others: (ix). (x). Safaguria (xi). Dionia (xii). Holguria (xiii). Simaluguria (xiv). Bortotia (xv). Lefebara (xvi). Raidongia (xvii). Piraseleka (xviii). Dhak-Chowa (xix). Pira-kotia.

8. Siring/Saring/Charing (07): (i). Lahkarakhun/Lakhurakhun/Lukhurakhun (ii). Phukan (iii). Barua (iv). Rajkhowa (v). Hazarika (vi). Saikia (vii). Bora.

9. Lahon: Lahan, Lekharu, Ligira, Mudoi, Lanmakharu Chetia, etc.

10. Sandikoi/Handique: Information unavailable.

11. Duarah: Information unavailable.

12. Dihingia: It separated from Mohan/Mohung ghar and became a phoid.

=== Clan/Khun/Phoid ===
Khuns means great men in Ahom history. Thakumtha created Lukhurakhun. Lahkar belongs to the Lahkarakhun/Lukhurakhun/Lakhurakhun clan.

=== Sub-Clan ===
Lahkar belongs to the Lahkarakhun sub-clan.

=== Family/Kul ===
Lahkar belongs to the Lahkarakhun family.

== Surname ==
- Achyut Lahkar, a mobile theatre veteran of Assam, India
- Bibhuti Lahkar, an Assamese conservationist and ecologist

== See also ==
- Ahom people
- Assamese People
- People of Assam
