= Supimpha =

Ahom king from 1493 to 1497

Supimphaa
- Chaopha of Ahom Kingdom

Ahom King
- Reign: 1493–1497
- Predecessor: Suhenphaa
- Successor: Suhungmung
- Born: Ahom kingdom
- Died: c. 1497; Ahom kingdom
- Issue: Suhungmung; Nang Mula; Kancheng Borpatragohain
- Dynasty: Ahom dynasty
- Father: Suhenphaa
- Religion: Ahom religion

Supimpha was the king of the Ahom kingdom from 1493 to 1497. In order to exact revenge on the murderers of his father Suhenpha, he unleashed a reign of terror among people of both high and low ranks alike.

Due to some minor fault, he even exiled one of his wives to Naga Hills, who was pregnant at that time. She later gave birth to a son named Konsheng, who would be appointed as the first Borpatrogohain of Ahom kingdom and will be known for his military genius and courage.

== Ancestry and accession ==
Supimpha was the eldest son of Ahom king Suhenpha. After his father’s assassination in 1493 CE, Susenpha ascended the throne as the new king of Ahom.

== Reign ==
=== Punishment of the murderers of Suhenpha ===
The first act of Supimpha, after ascending to the throne, was to trace out and execute the conspirators who had plotted and assassinated his father Suhenpha. The main accused Lantarunban and his two sons, Taophrong and Khuntao was arrested after some search operations. Later all three of them were executed. Other co-conspirators were also punished for their co-operation in the crime. Khunlung Burhagohain was also suspected to have links in the conspiracy. Therefore, fearing punishment from the king, Khunlung Burhagohain fled from his quarters. Supimpha immediately dismissed Khunlung Burhagohain from his office, and appointed another member of Burhagohain family, Khunlung Khampeng as the new Burhagohain. Later Khunlung Burhagohain was arrested but he escaped the capital punishment as the nobles requested the king to grant forgiveness. The property of Khunlung Burhagohain was confiscated and he was exiled to his village residence.

=== Exile of the royal consort and birth of Kancheng ===
The Nagas had maintained friendly relations since the time of Supimpha’s father, king Suhenpha. Every year, they come to pay tribute and respect to the Ahom king in the capital. One of the wives of Supimpha happened to see a Naga chief who had come to pay tribute, and praised his beauty in the king’s hearing. The king was so enraged and furious that he immediately ordered her exile to the Naga village, from which that Naga chief belonged. She was pregnant at the time and subsequently gave birth to a son. He was named as Senglung, but he will be become famous as Kancheng. Supimpha’s successor Suhungmung would come to know about Kancheng and his royal origin. He brought Kancheng to his court and appointed him to the newly created office of Borpatrogohain, equal in ranks with the office of Burhagohain and Borgohain. Kancheng Borpatrogohain would serve Suhungmung in many battles and under his military leadership, the Ahom army reached the banks of Karatoya river, the western boundary of ancient Kamrup Kingdom.

== Death ==
During his short reign (1493 CE-1497 CE), Supimpha tried to trace out all people who were in league with the conspiracy in assassination of his father, Suhenpha. Many people were traced out and then they along with their relatives were tortured and severely punished. The nobles were terrified by these high handed actions of the king. While these search operations were going on, Supimpha died, suddenly in 1497 CE. Historical accounts vary regarding the cause of his death. Some accounts attribute his death to natural cause, while some records maintained that he was assassinated. Prominent Assamese historian and writer Gunaviram Burua stated since the assassination of Suhenpha caused much unrest and terror among the people, therefore, the nobles after assassinating Supimpha, hide the real facts and spread the news of the death of king due to natural causes. Supimpha was succeeded by his son Suhungmung, whose reign was characterized by expansion of Ahom kingdom into the territories of Kachari kingdom and Chutiya kingdom.

== See also ==
- Ahom Dynasty
- Ahom Kingdom
- Assam
- Assassination
- Kachari kingdom
- Nagaland
- Regicide
- Sibsagar district
- Singarigharutha ceremony
- Sukapha
- Chutiya kingdom
