= Turbak's invasion of Assam =

16th-century confrontation in India

- Part of Islamic invasions of Assam
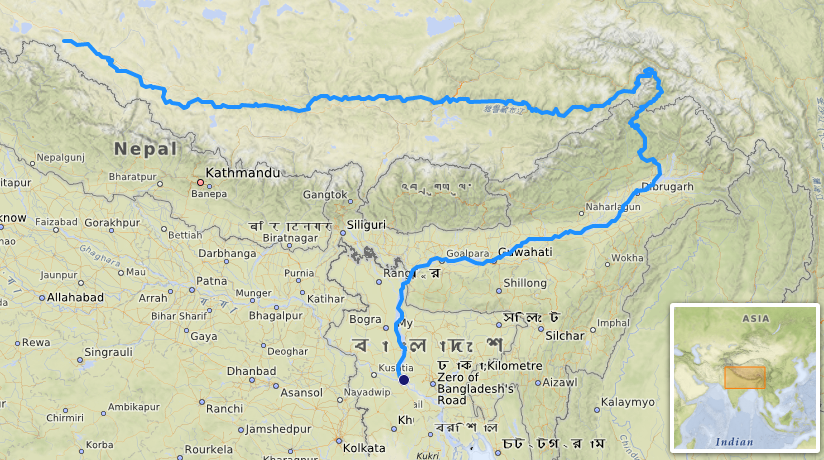
- Path of the Brahmaputra River
Date	1532–1533
Location	Assam, India
Result	Ahom kingdom victory

Belligerents
Ahom Kingdom: Kachari Kingdom	Bengal Sultanate

Commanders and leaders
Suhungmung; Suklen (WIA); Kan-Seng Senglung; Mula Gabharu †; Phrasengmung †?	Turbak †; Hussain Khan (executed); Taju †; Sangul †

Strength
Large; 700 ships	Large; 1,100 cavalry 1,000 infantry 36 elephants many guns and canons

Casualties and losses
8 commanders	2,500 men 20 ships 28 elephants 850 horses many cannons and matchlocks

The Turbak's invasion of Assam, one of many Turko-Afghan invasions of Assam, was a sustained military engagement between Turbak Khan, a Turko-Afghan commander from the Bengal Sultanate and the Ahom kingdom. After some initial success, Turbak was eventually killed in battle by the Ahom forces, and his army was routed and pursued to the Karatoya River.

The Ahoms pursued the retreating forces up to the point where the Karatoya River meets the Brahmaputra River. This victory was crucial for the Ahoms, and the ruler of Gauda had to yield, surrendering land and even arranging marriage alliances. Visva Singha, a Koch ruler, was also acknowledged as a subordinate leader under Ahom rule and was expected to send regular tribute to the Ahoms.

According to historians, Turbak's invasion introduced firearms in Assam, but there are Ahom records that mention firearms even before that, when they conquered the Chutias. The Ahoms also constructed a road from Gauhati to the Karatoya River during this campaign.

== Background ==
The first important Muhammadan invasion which is recorded in the Ahom history is that of 1527 when the great Vazir led the invasion. The Ahoms gave chase, with great tenacity, to the invaders, seized forty horses, and many more cannons. Suhungmung then went to Sala and captured Duimunisila, erected a fort at the mouth of the Burai River, and established troops at Phultiari. More expeditions were made up the Kallang and Bharali Rivers. Slaves and other spoils were captured in these. A strong guard was left behind at Narayanpur to secure the area.

After the resolution of the Kachari struggles, Muhammadan hostilities again turned against the Ahoms. The first Muhammadan counterattack came in the form of a Muslim commander, Luipat (or Luput), who marched up the Brahmaputra with fifty vessels. The outcome of the battle at Temeni was the victory of the Ahoms, forcing the Muslim commander to flee on horseback. After this victory, the Ahoms rebuilt their forts at Kangaripara and Sala on the river Bharali.

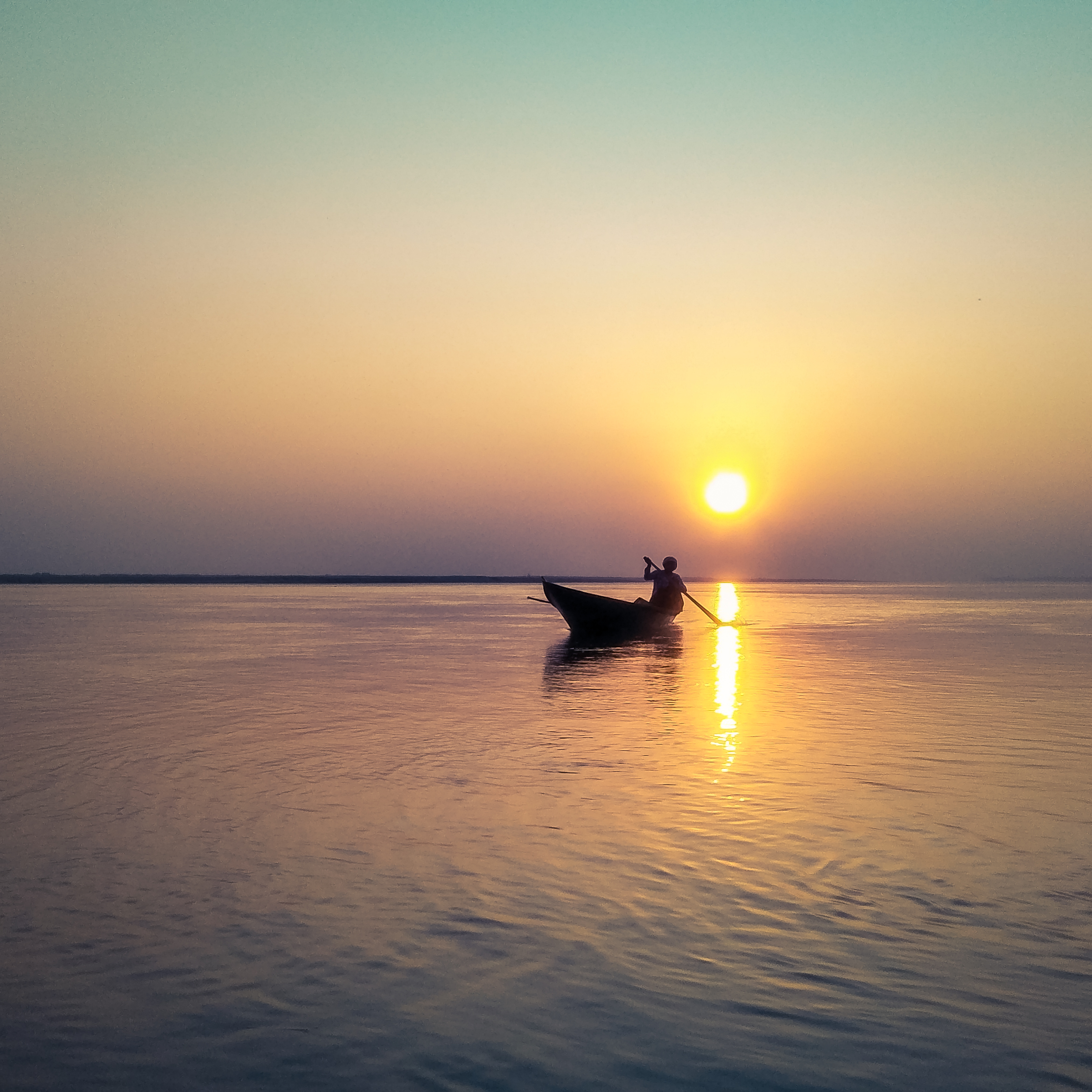
Silhouette of a fisherman on boat during sunset at Brahmaputra River

Subsequently, garrisons were posted at Sala, Singiri, and on the Bharali. Singiri, under the command of Barpatra Gohain. The Muhammadans resumed their march up the Brahmaputra, and another encounter took place at Temeni. Kangaripara, under the command of Senglung Barpatrugohain, was subsequently invaded by a fresh Muslim general, Bit Malik (also known as Mit Manik). The Ahoms again defeated the Muslims, and their general was slain in action.

The Ahoms captured fifty horses, besides many cannons and guns. The pursuit of the retreating enemy went up to Khagarijan, the present Nowgong. Suhungmung rewarded the Ahom soldiers for their service after the battle. By early 1532, a new fort had been built at Temeni under the supervision of Senglung. Suhungmung eventually rewarded Barpatra Gohain with a beautiful girl and with an elegant trophy and a ceremonial tribute known as the Rikkhvan Ceremony.

== Invasion ==
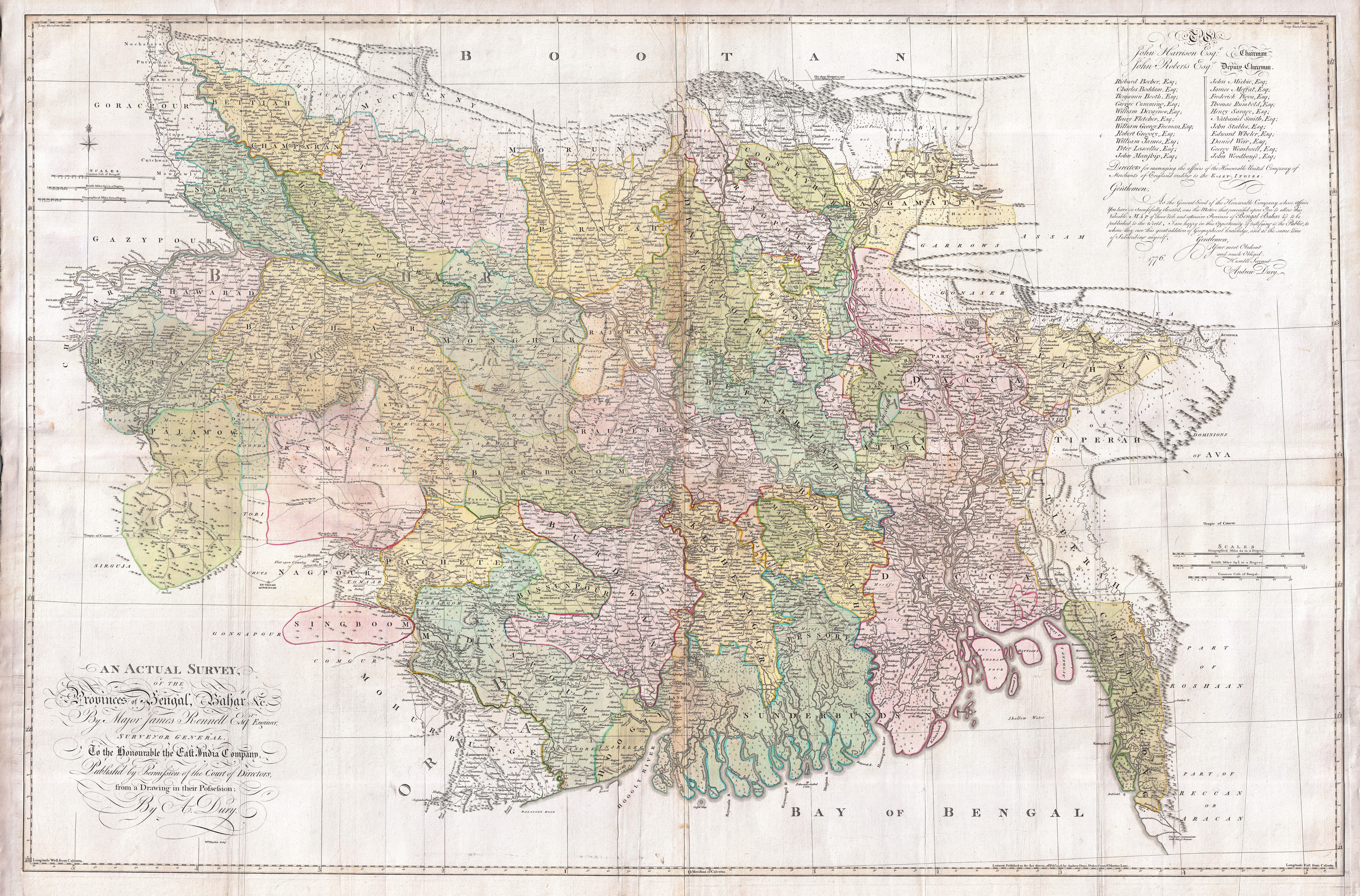
James Rennell's 1776 map shows the Brahmaputra's flow before an earthquake on 2 April 1762 and the Teesta River flowing in three channels to the Ganga before a flood in 1787.

=== Battle of Singri ===
In 1532, a Turco-Afghan commander named Turbak invaded Ahom territory with 1,000 cavalry, 30 elephants, and plenty of guns and cannons. He set up his camp near the fort at Singiri. He set up camp near the fort at Singiri. Suklen, Ahom forces crossed the Brahmaputra, and then, against warnings by the astrologers, they attacked the Muslim camp, and the result of the battle proved disastrous to the Ahoms: eight of its commanders, including Phrasengmung, were killed. Suklen narrowly escaped with a grievous wound. The Muslims held back the advance for the rainy season at Koilabar.

=== Further preparations ===
The Ahoms withdrew to Sala, where they rallied with fresh troops and elected Senglung as the new commander-in-chief. The Muslim forces continued their march and camped at Kaliabar. Understanding that the previous defeat was because of their weak naval power, King Suhungmung ordered the preparation of a more powerful navy. By June, the Ahoms had prepared 700 ships, and the Kachari army joined them to strengthen their position.

The participation of Ahom women is also notable. Mula Gabharu was a key leader in the Assamese resistance to the invasion of Assam by Turbak in 1532. She is referred to by historians as a symbol of sacrifice and courage in the resistance against the invading forces. Mula Gabharu was married to Phrasengmung Borgohain, an Ahom army commander and nobleman. She lost a loved one when her husband was killed in battle. Upon hearing the news of his death, she decided to lead the enemy soldiers into battle despite the danger, putting the dignity of the Ahom kingdom above her life.

=== Battle of Duimunisila ===
In October, the Muslims moved forward to Ghiladhari, and by November, Suklenmung had recovered from his wounds and led the Ahom forces at Sala. The Muslim forces launched an attack and set fire to houses outside the fort, but were surprised and routed in a counterattack by the Ahoms. Though the Muslims continued their cautious advance in the following months, the tide of the conflict turned in March 1533, when they were attacked again, but this time they successfully defended the fort by pouring boiling water over the enemy.

Despite this, the Muslims succeeded in gaining some ground in the subsequent encounters. However, by March 1533, the Ahoms were able to reverse the tide in their favour. In a naval battle at Duimunsilla, they inflicted heavy losses on the Muslim forces, The Muslim commanders, Taju and Sangal, were killed, The invading forces lost 2,500 men, 20 ships, and several large cannons, marking a turning point in the war in favor of the Ahoms.

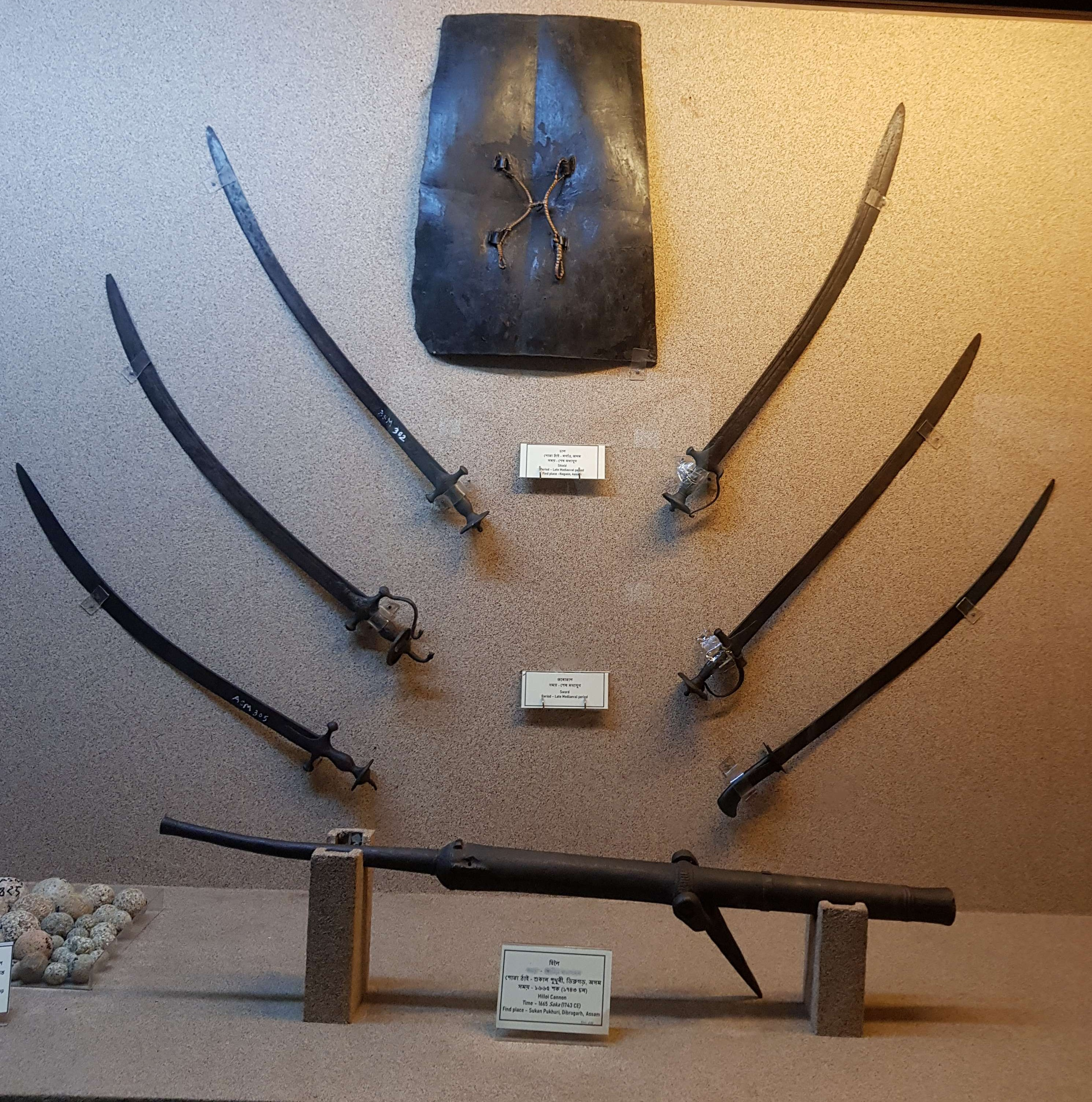
Weapons of Ahom era.

=== Battle of Bharali ===
Husain Khan, another Muslim general, arrived to reinforce Turbak's forces with six elephants, 100 cavalry, and 1,000 infantry troops. Reinforced by Husain Khan, Turbak took position near the Dikrai River, across from the Ahom camp. However, the Ahoms were now better prepared and managed to defeat the Muslims in several engagements. Mula Gabharu showed immense courage on the battlefield, killing several enemy soldiers. She was, however, later struck by a bullet from Turbak, killing her instantly. The five women who accompanied her to the battlefield also died. The women's sacrifice galvanized the Ahom forces, which fought with renewed passion.

The final confrontation occurred near the Bharali River. Eventually, the Ahom general Kan-Seng Barpatra Gohain managed to drive Turbak out, and Turbak was killed by a spear, presenting his severed head to the Ahom king. The Muslims were thrown into disarray. The Ahoms pursued the retreating forces to the river Karatoya, at which they won a complete victory. Ahom forces managed to capture rich spoils of war in the form of 28 elephants, 850 horses, many cannons, and matchlocks. Hussain Khan was captured and executed. To celebrate the victory, they constructed a temple and dug a tank next to the Karatoya River. According to local custom, they buried heads of Turbak and Hussain Khan at Charaideo Hill.

== Outcome ==
With the victory of these battles, Ahoms now started to implement firearms and artillery for their battle use. The guns and ammunition start to be made there; they acquire the cannon production and powder formulation, perhaps with the help of Muslim captured prisoners in this phase of development. Over time, they improve their technology on firearms; they will face most of their serious battles, some of which include the celebrated invasion by Mir Jumla in the 1660s. It was a battle that had military significance, as well as one of strategic value. The Ahoms proved able to defend their land against such a mighty power. It not only solidified their position but also brought greater relations with powers neighbouring them and with the Koch rulers. After this, the Ahoms began to expand their territory and consolidate power within Assam, learning from the battle against Turbak to strengthen their defences.

== Aftermath ==
During the campaign, Ahom forces constructed a road connecting Gauhati to the Karatoya River. The Ahoms erected a stone pillar with an audacious warning inscribed:

Anyone who takes this country without a battle will send their ancestors to hell, get beaten with a broom by a Hari, and wear a woman's mekhala.

Interestingly, Muslim records do not mention these events, leading to debates. Gait thought the invasions were by local Muslim chiefs or freelancers, not the Bengal Sultan. According to Acharya, the aggressor was the Bengal Sultan, and their defeats were deliberately left out by Muslim chroniclers.

Suhungmung captured Namdang from the Chutias and established a town there. He later shifted his capital to Bakata, near the Dihing River. He transplanted many Ahoms from Garhgaon, such as 300 Gharphaliya families with their chiefs, to Sadiya and the Dihing region. Skilled artisans like blacksmiths, Brahmins, and artisans were brought to the capital.

After defeating the forces of Turbak, Muslim prisoners were settled in different areas. Initially, they were given some jobs such as cultivating or cutting elephant grass. Since they were not good at the same, they changed their job to working in brass. Their descendants continue doing this trade, called Morias.

The major loss in his reign came through a cattle epidemic in 1534, while the Jovian cycle was replaced by the Hindu Saka era. His reign witnessed Vaishnavism spreading as a result of the teachings by Sankar Deva. The success, however, proved a cause of betrayal for Suhungmung when Suklen conspired with a Kachari servant named Ratiman, who assassinated the king when he was sleeping.

Suhungmung was a bold and effective ruler. Within his regime, the Ahoms annexed lands by beating back the Chutiyas, breaking Kachari power, repulsing Muslim incursions and conquering Naga raiders. In 1535, several Naga villages, including Malan and Pangkha, rebelled and soon included the Jakhang Nagas. Suhungmung dispatched his generals, who successfully crushed the uprising. The Khamjangia Nagas surrendered, presenting 100 methons (Note: A species of wild cows) to him as a token of their surrender, and peace returned to the region.

== Legacy ==
The practice of gunnery in Assam is typically attributed to Turbak's invasion in the year 1532, but Assamese histories trace their existence dating back to the Ahom conquest of the Chutiyas. This would place the establishment of gunnery in Assam many years before Turbak. The Koches and the Ahoms, formally, came into mutual contact around the year 1533 when Koch chieftain Visva Singha submitted to the Ahom forces, vowing to pay annual tribute.

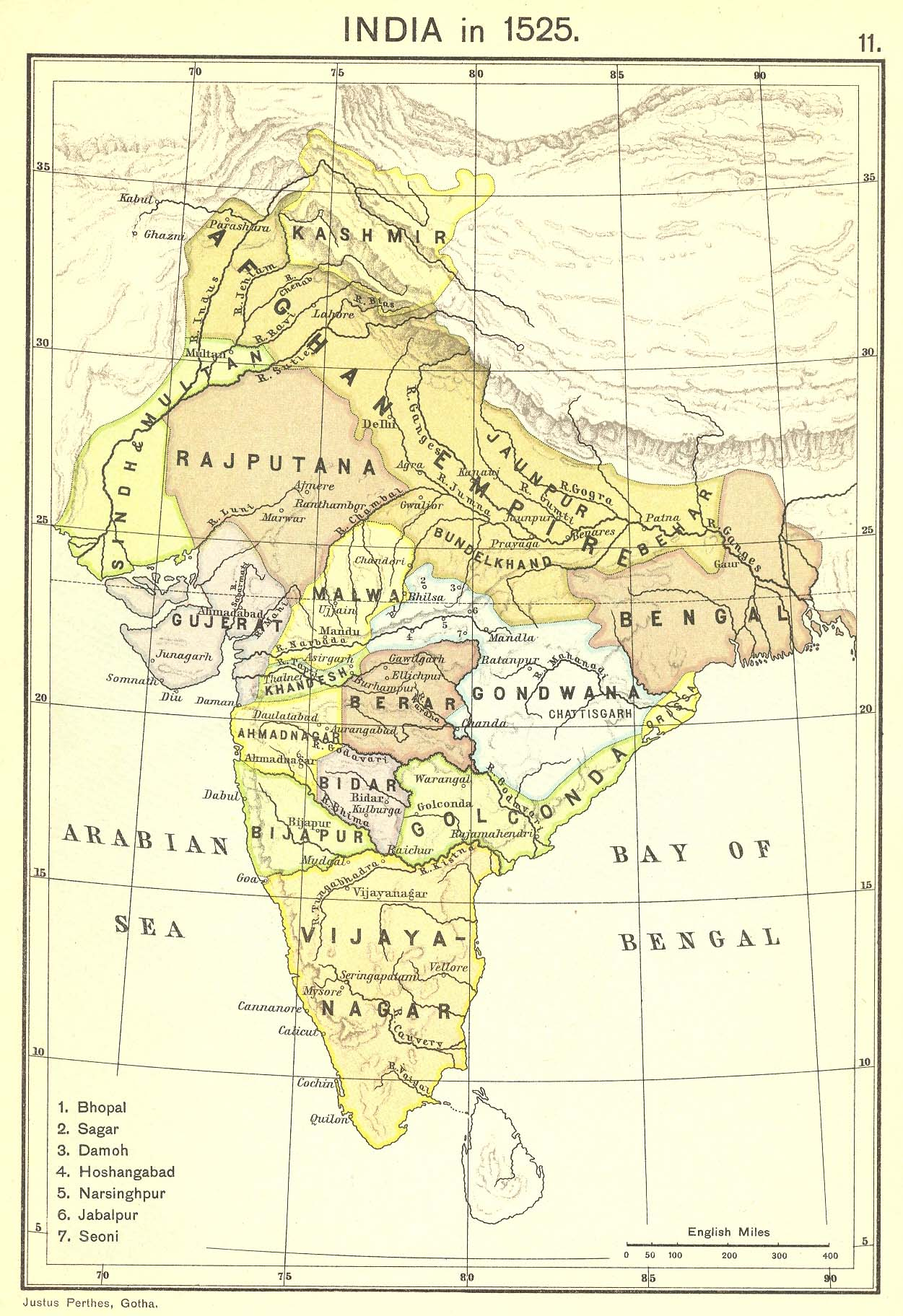
The Indian subcontinent in 1525, with Bengal in the east

According to legend, Mula Gabharu caused the death of her husband, as she was unable to prepare a Kabas Kapor (amulet cloth) in time due to her menstrual cycle—a ritual considered necessary for gaining protection while in battle. Seeking revenge, she rallied a group of five other women from the Ahom kingdom to accompany her to the battle. Their presence and courage are said to have energised the Ahom soldiers, giving them a new motivation to fight the invaders.

Mula Gabharu's legacy remains a source of inspiration for Assamese, particularly as a symbol of patriotism, sacrifice, and resilience. Historians debate the exact timeline of these events, with some sources pointing to Phrasengmung being killed during the fifth Muslim invasion in 1527, and Turbak's invasion in 1532. Irrespective of the exact timeline, Mula Gabharu remains a revered figure in Assam's history.

A contrasting view, however, is presented by historian Amanatulla Ahmed, who suggests that the Ahom army launched a sudden attack on Koch territory, forcing Visva Singha to capitulate. One Ahom chronicle records that Visva Singha initially planned to intercept the returning Ahom army from Gauda. However, his advisors, anticipating the devastating consequences of a confrontation with the superior Ahom forces, dissuaded him. Ultimately, Visva Singha succumbed peacefully and henceforth sealed a relationship between the Koches and the Ahoms.

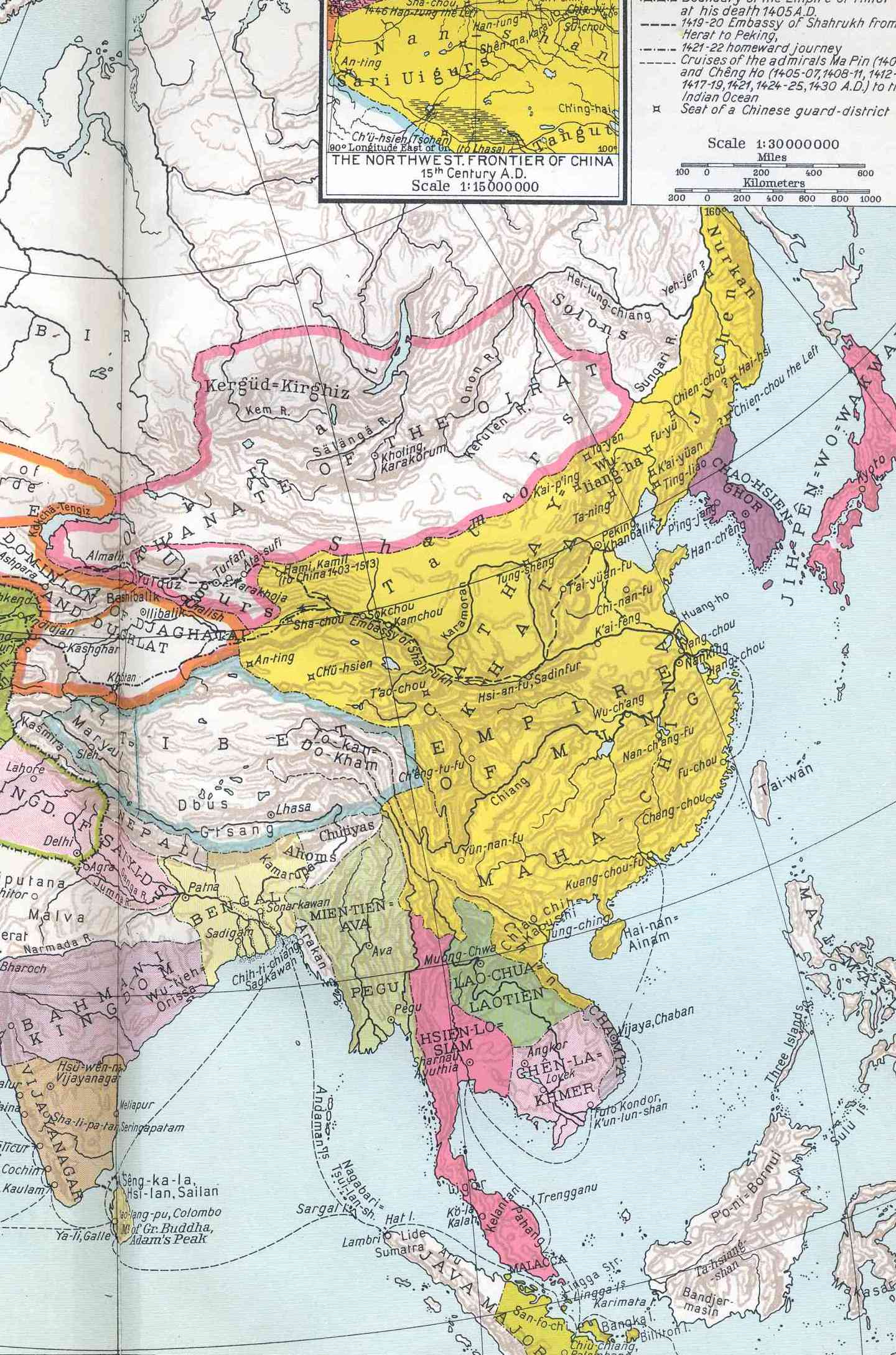
Map of Asia in 1415 showing Bengal and other regional states

Westward expansion of the Ahoms would be another viable factor during the early 16th century, despite the fact that their dominions were not in direct communication. Following submission by Visva Singha, after consultation with King Suhungmung (1497–1539), Ahom general Chao-sheng-lung Tan-Khan recognized the alliance. In this treaty, the Gauda ruler, who was defeated by the Ahoms, presented the Ahoms with two princesses and five parganas on the west side of the Sankosh River as dowry. This maintained an alliance between the Koches and the Ahoms.

== See also ==
- Ahom–Mughal wars
- Turco-Afghan
- Suklenmung
- Battle of Bharali

== Bibliography ==
- Acharyya, Nagendra Nath (1966). The History of Medieval Assam, from the Thirteenth to the Seventeenth Century: A Critical and Comprehensive History of Assam During the First Four Centuries of Ahom Rule, Based on Original Assamese Sources, Available Both in India and England. Dutta Baruah.
- Basu, Nirmal Kumar (1970). Assam in the Ahom Age, 1228–1826: Being Politico-economic and Socio-cultural Studies. Sanskrit Pustak Bhandar.
- Kumar, Monoj (29 March 2021). The Muslim Question in Assam and Northeast India. Taylor & Francis. ISBN 978-1-000-37027-0.
- Majumdar, R.C. (1990). The Delhi Sultanate. Bharatiya Vidya Bhavan Bombay.
- Nag, Sajal (17 July 2023). The Mughals and the North-East: Encounter and Assimilation in Medieval India. Taylor & Francis. ISBN 978-1-000-90525-0.
- Nath, Pratyay (2019). Climate of Conquest: War, Environment, and Empire in Mughal North India. Oxford University Press. ISBN 978-0-19-949555-9.
- Pathak, Guptajit; Sharma, A. P. (2008). Assam's history and its graphics. Mittal Publications. ISBN 978-81-8324-251-6.
- Pathak, Guptajit (2008). Assamese Women in Indian Independence Movement: With a Special Emphasis on Kanaklata Barua. Mittal Publications. ISBN 978-81-8324-233-2.
- Barua, Golap Chandra (1985). Ahom-buranji, from the Earliest Time to the End of Ahom Rule: With Parallel English Translation. Spectrum Publications.
