= Ruins of Kachari Rajbari =

Kachari Rajbari
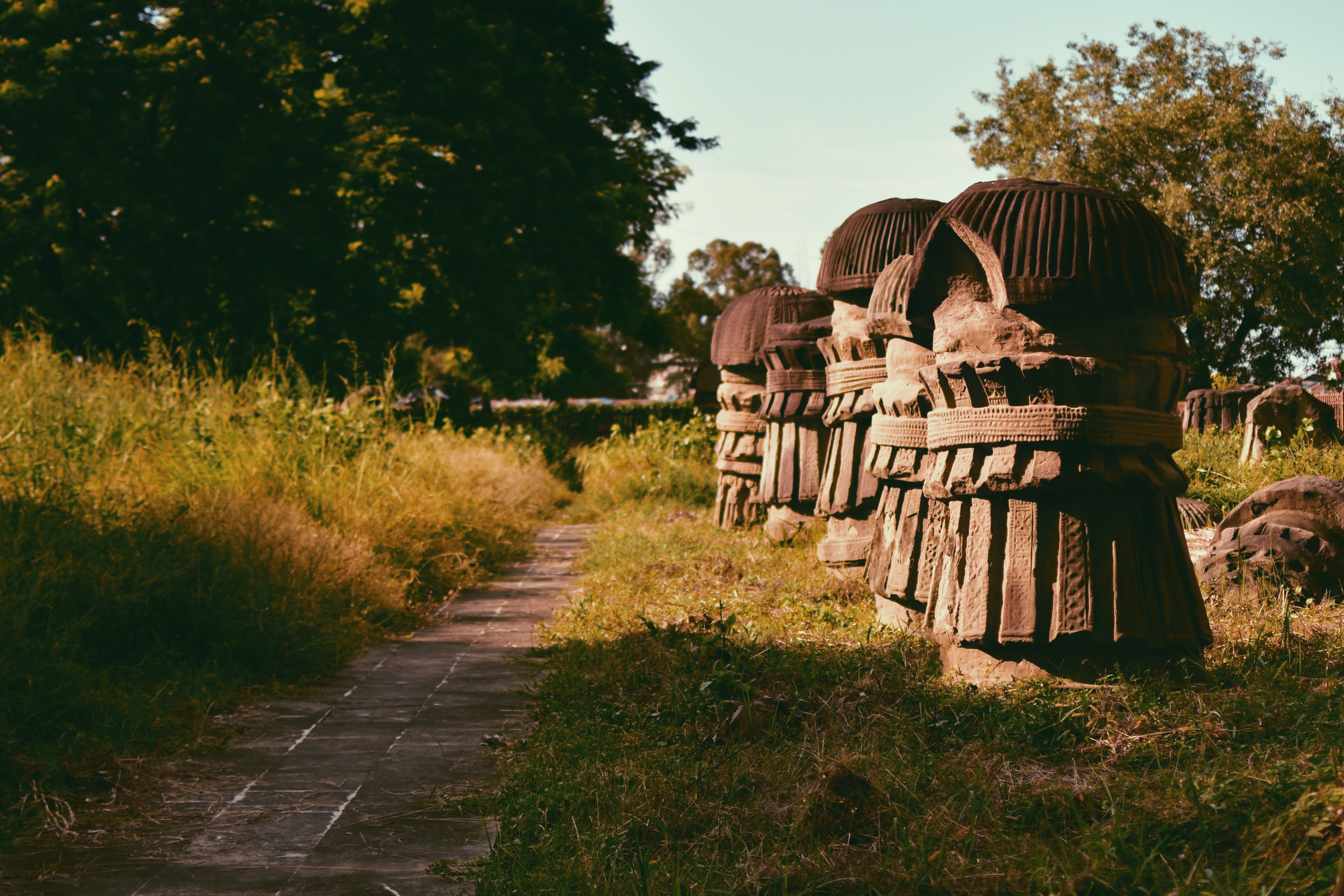
- Kachari Rajbari Ruins
- Interactive map of the Kachari Rajbari area

General information
- Type: Monument
- Location: Dimapur, India
- Coordinates: 25°54′13″N 93°44′25″E
- Construction started: 13th century
- Client: Kachari Kingdom
- Operator: Archaeological Survey of India

Ruins of Kachari Rajbari are a set of medieval monuments located in Dimapur, Nagaland, in Northeast India. Their history dates back to the 10th century when they appeared during the Kachari civilization. The Kachari Rajbari Ruins are a series of mushroom domed pillars. They were created by the Kachari Kingdom, which ruled Dimapur before the Ahom invasion into the territory during the 16th century. Their origin and purpose are largely mysterious. The pillars are not well maintained. Some pillars still stand in all their glory but others have crumbled down. It is believed that a game similar to chess was played there with the mushroom domes.

== Colonial descriptions of the Ruins ==
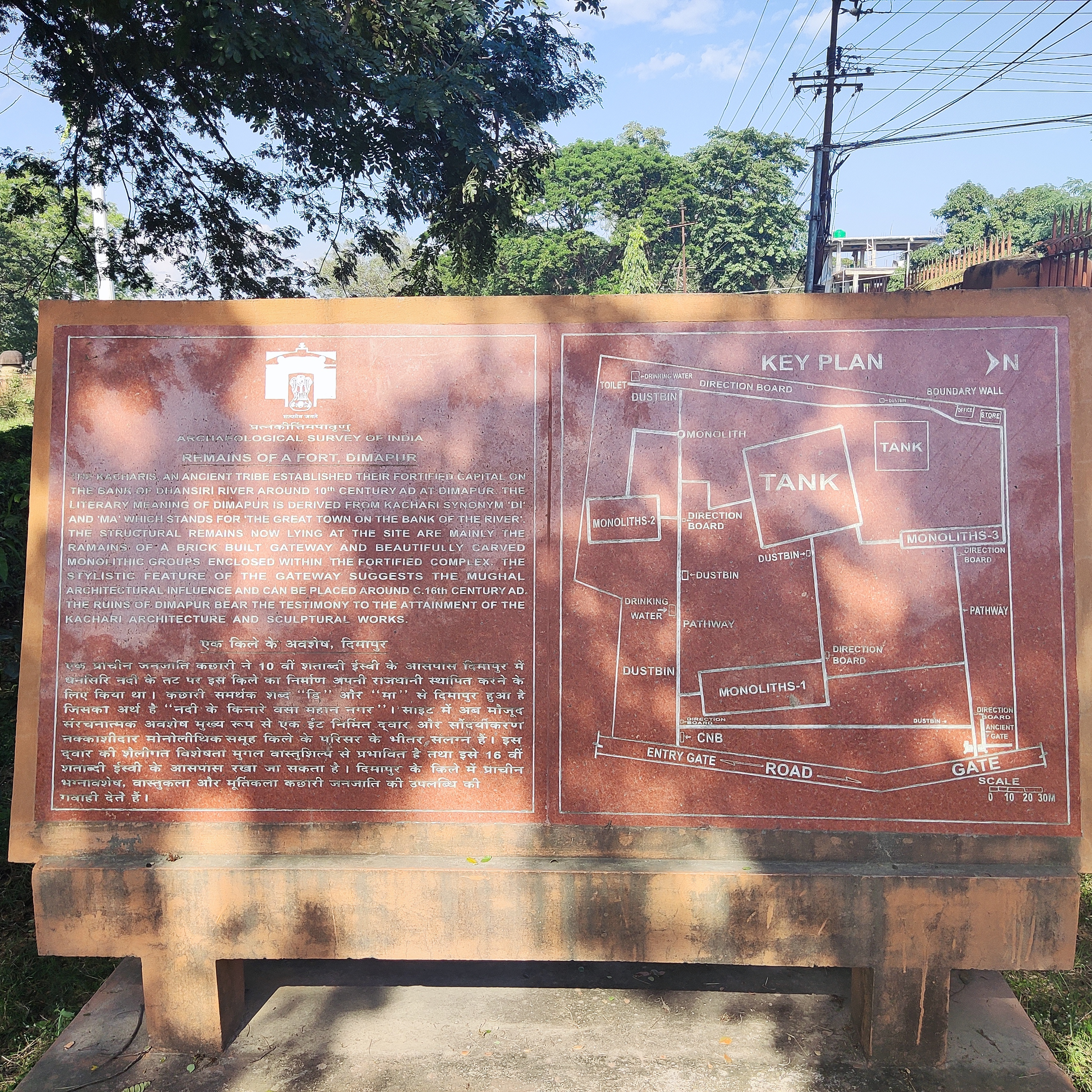
ASI Plaque with information on the ruins

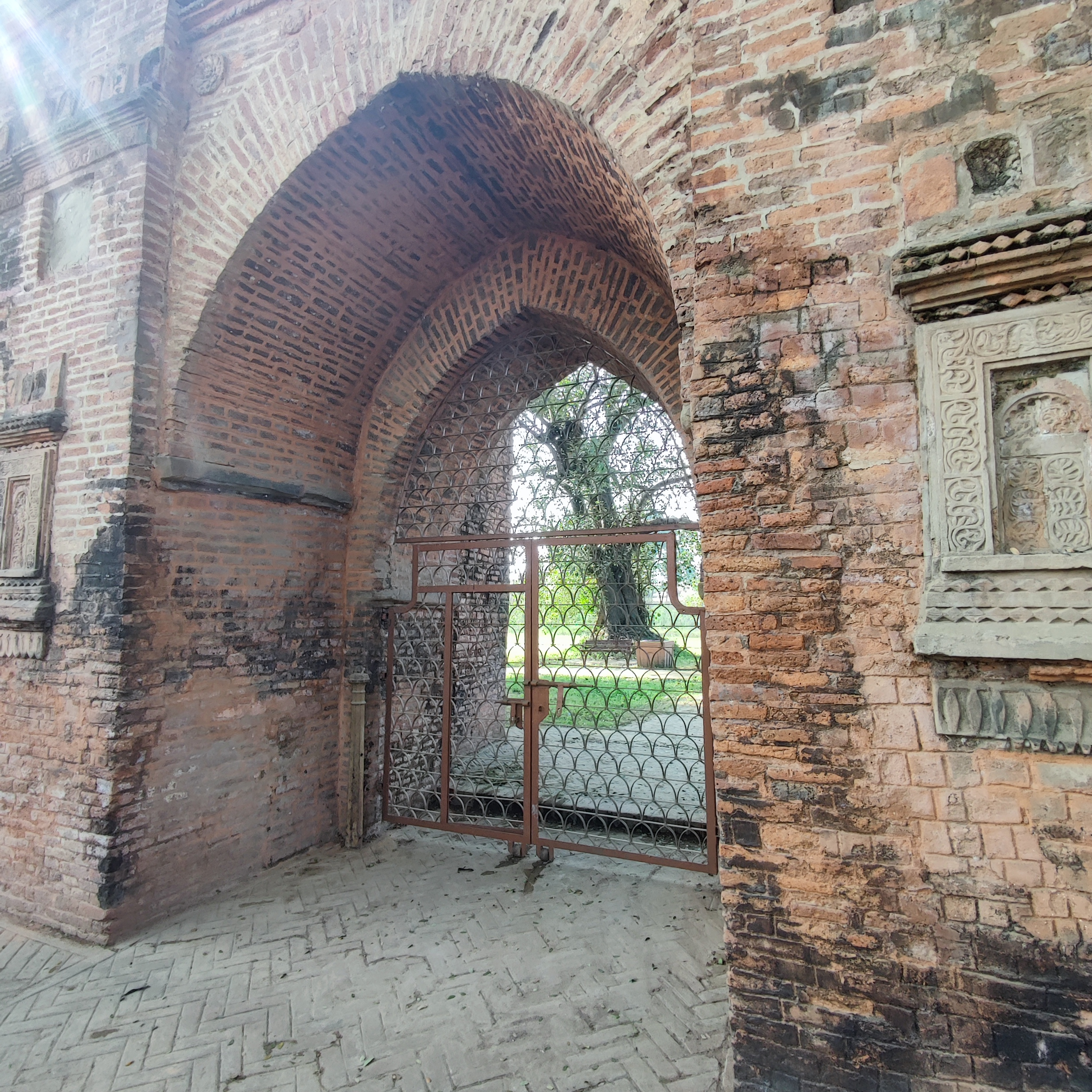
Entrance to the main gate

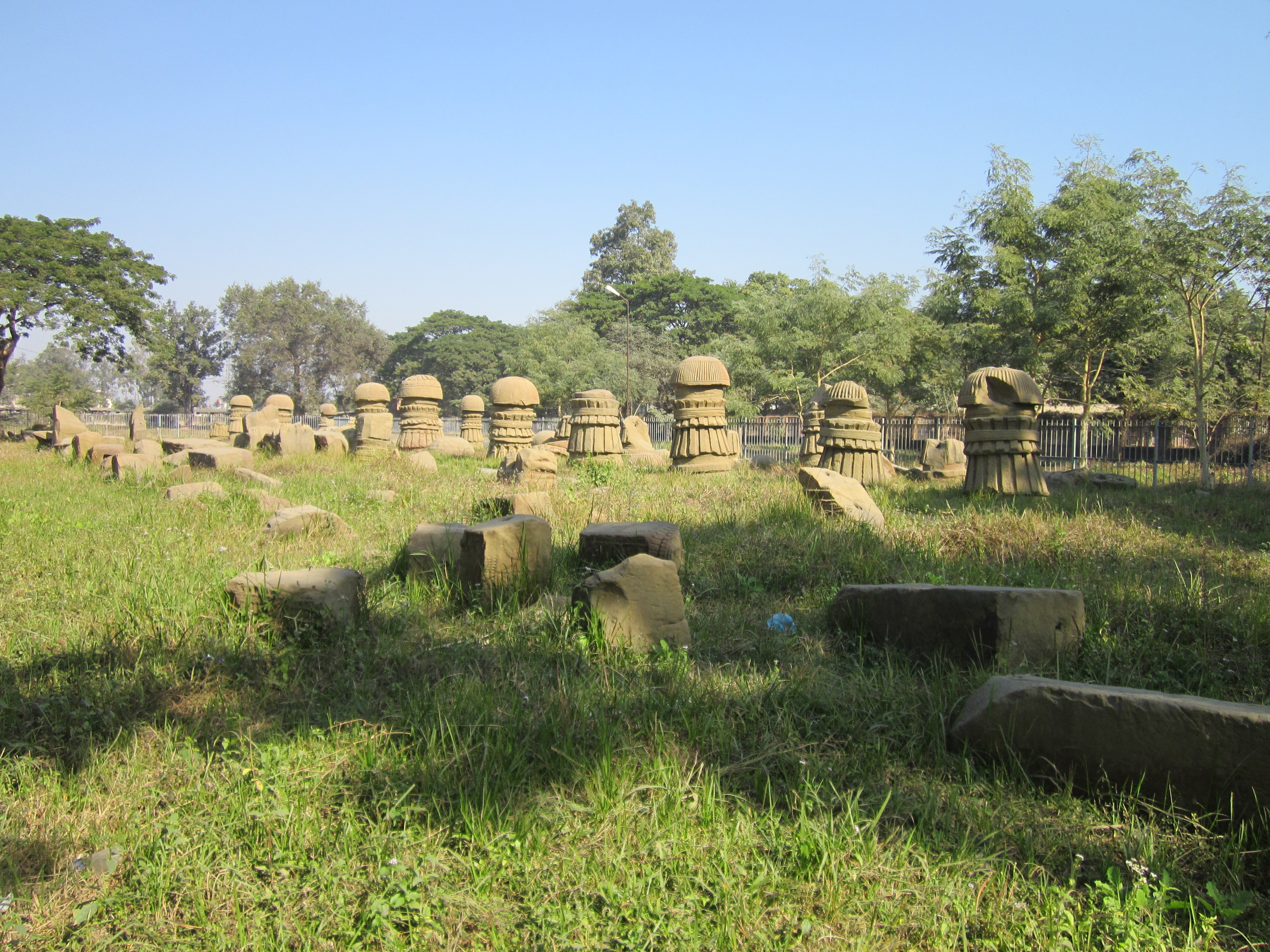
Kachari ruins in Dimapur

Lieutenant Grange, then Assistant Political Agent to the colonial government in Assam, undertook his first expedition to the Naga Hills in 1840. An extract from his journal was published in the Journal of Asiatic Society. In his description of the Dhemapore Nugger (Dimapur), he described that they consisted of "some pillars of various pattern, a gateway, the ruined tower, or palace walls, and a small fort to the north, besides tanks both within and without the walls."

In 1840, the fort was surrounded on three sides by a dry ditch. The gateway, Grange described, to be in a "tolerable state of preservation" but the inner passage or guard room had turned into "a heap of ruins." In 1874, Major H. H. Godwin-Austen, from the Topographical Survey of India, describes the entrance gateway as "fine solid mass of masonry... the stone which are pierced to receive the hinges of double heavy door, are still in perfect preservation." He further sketches it to be flanked on both sides by octagonal turrets of bricks with "false windows of ornamental moulded brick work."

The pillars were in three parallel rows. The form of the town, or palace enclosure, was an oblong square running parallel to the Dhansiri river. Through oral tradition, Grange notes that it was built by Chokradoz, the fourth king of Cachar. These pillars, according to Godwin-Austen, were the most distinguishing feature of the ruins. However, he counted them as two rows rather than three as Grange noted. The tallest pillar was about 15 feet, and the smallest one at the southern end was 8 feet and 5 inches. Most of these pillars were around 12 to 13 feet. The lotus was evident in all of the carved work.

Jae-Eun Shin (2020) points out that early colonial descriptions by successive British administrators fail to mention any clear trace of temples and images at the ruins. This raises doubt about the scale and intensity of Brahmanisation in the early history of the Dimasas. She also points out that this city is probably the one mentioned in the Ahom Buranji, which records that Ahom king Suhungmung (alias Dihingia Rāja) and his son reached the city by ascending the river Timā (Dima or Dhansiri) in 1526 when the Ahoms attacked Dimapur. However, no Brahmanical temples or images are mentioned in this Ahom Buranji record either.
