= Mula Gabharu =

Tai woman of Tai-Ahom Kingdom

- Born: 1486; Ahom kingdom
- Died: 1532 (aged 45–46)
- Other name: Nang Mula
- Occupation: Warrior
- Known for: Raising female warriors, martyrdom
- Spouse: Phrasengmung Borgohain
- Children: Ton Kham
- Parent: Supimphaa
- Military career
- Conflicts: Turbak's invasion of Assam

Mula Gabharu (also known as Nang Mula) was the daughter of the Ahom king, Supimphaa, and the wife of Phrasengmung Borgohain. She organised women warriors after her husband had fallen in battle against Turbak, an invader sent by the Sultan of Bengal in 1532, and herself fell in the Battle of Kachua. During the battle, women warrior Jayanti, Pamila, Lalita, etc., were the companions of Nang Mula.

== Biography ==
Mula was the daughter of the Ahom king Supimphaa, and the wife of Phrasengmung Borgohain. Mula's brother, Suhungmung, succeed their father as the king of the Ahom kingdom. Mula Gabhoru's husband, Phrasengmung, heard that the minister Khunlung and other warriors lost their lives in the hands of Turbak. Mula Gabharu said to Phrasengmung, 'There are dark clouds in the skies of Assam. To preserve Assam's freedom and protect it from destruction, you must join the war'. Her husband told her, "You are an idol of bravery, and with you as my wife, I am fearless. To me, life and death are not important than the independence of this country. The shield of self-defence and the weapon of courage is the best shield". During the war, Mula Gabharu gave her hands to her husband and said, "Be able to protect your country, your own son, and your own wealth and honor with these words."

== Promise to defeat Turbak ==
Phrasengmung promised by lighting 101 lamps, a tradition known as Kin Lao, that he will take the determination of protecting his country, son, awards, and honors. The Ahom soldiers, who wore armors, were themselves unbeatable. Phrasengmung did not get the chance to wear his armor and fought without armor. After seven days of fighting, the news of her husband's death reached Mula Gabhoru. In mourning, she promised to destroy the murderers of her husband. After that, she took a Hengdang and joined the war. On the fourth day of the war, she saw her husband's murderer, the commander Turbak Khan. Seeing her husband's murderer in the war zone, Nang Mula bravely fought with Turbak Khan. But Turbak Khan was a trained fighter and so he killed Mula Gabharu. After her death, the Ahom soldiers were awakened in new strength. Under the leadership of Kanseng Borpatro Gohain, the Ahom soldiers defeated Turbak in the place of Mokh.

== Memorials and monuments ==
=== School ===
Mulagabhoru Girl's MES School was established in 1987 in the name of great warrior Mula Gabharu. The school is situated in Dichow Botua, Sivasagar, Assam, Postal Code: 785670 India.

=== Mula Gabharu Day ===
People of Assam celebrate Mulagabhoru Day on 29th May every year.

=== Birangana Mula Gabharu Award ===
Every year, Tai Ahom Yuva Parishad (TYPA) holds a ceremony on Mulagabhoru Day and presents the Birangana Mula Gabharu Award.
