= Suhenpha =

Ahom king from 1488 to 1493

Suhenphaa
- Chaopha of Ahom Kingdom

Ahom King
- Reign: 1488–1493
- Predecessor: Susenphaa
- Successor: Supimphaa
- Born: Ahom kingdom
- Died: c. 1493; Ahom kingdom
- Issue: Supimphaa
- Dynasty: Ahom dynasty
- Father: Susenphaa
- Religion: Ahom religion

Suhenpha was the king of the Ahom kingdom from 1488 to 1493. His reign was characterized by the expansion of Ahom kingdom which resulted in conflicts with the Nagas and with the Kachari kingdom. He was successful in the military actions against the Nagas, while in case of Kacharis, he suffered defeat and had to sue for peace with the Kacharis. He was assassinated by one Ahom of Tairungban clan.

== Ancestry and accession ==
Suhenpha was the son of Ahom king Susenpha. Susenpha ruled for a long period of 49 years, during which the kingdom witnessed peace and prosperity. When Susenpha died in 1488, Suhenpha succeeded him as the king of Ahom kingdom.

== Reign ==
=== Conflicts with Nagas ===
The Tangsu Nagas, who were defeated during the reign of Suhenpha’s father Susenpha, again raised their banner against the royal authority. They began to raids villages in the plains of Brahmaputra and took common Assamese people as prisoner. To counter this acts of atrocities by Tangsu Nagas, Suhenpha dispatched Taokangbanrek Borgohain with a contingent of Ahom soldiers. The Tangsu Nagas attacked the Ahom forces and completely destroyed it. The commander of the army, Taokangbanrek Borgohain was captured and later beheaded by the Nagas. His head was taken by the Tangsu Nagas to their native villages as prize of battle. Suhenpha immediately ordered fresh recruitment of soldiers and after gathering a huge army, he dispatched the newly appointed Nangrang Borgohain against the Tangsu Nagas. After fierce battle, Nangrang Borgohain scored complete victory against the Tangsu Nagas, and they were forced to submit to the Ahoms. The Tangsu Nagas also agreed to pay an annual tribute to the Ahom king. Nangrang Borgohain brought several Naga prisoners as a symbol of his victory and after obtaining permission from Suhenpha, settled them in different parts of the Ahom kingdom.

=== War with the Kacharis ===
Suhenpha desired to expand his kingdom towards downstream of Brahmaputra river. The Kacharis who, at that time, held a large portion of Upper Assam, obstructed the expansion of Ahom kingdom into their territory. Suhenpha decided to use force, and ordered one Ahom officer Chelaoseng Neog to construct a fortification at Tongsu within Kachari territory. The fortification was constructed without any opposition from Kacharis. Encouraged by this success, he dispatched Khunlung Burhagohain with an army to march further inwards into Kachari territory. The Kacharis fiercely resisted the advance of Khunlung Burhagohain and were successful in defeating the Ahom army. One Ahom commander Jiyeumung Neog and 150 soldiers lost their lives. The Kacharis chased Ahoms to the banks of Dikhou river. The commander of Ahom army, Khunlung Burhagohain managed to escape by swimming across the Dikhou river, leaving his elephants and other valuables. After consultations with the nobles, Suhenpha sued for peace with the Kachari king. A princess was sent to the Kachari king with two elephants and twelve female slaves as her dowry. Some chronicles stated that the result of the battle was indecisive, and when peace was made, the Kacharis ceded some territory to Ahom.

=== Assassination ===
One Ahom named Lantarunban of Tairungban clan was caught for stealing some paddy from the royal granary. He and his companions were punished and fined for their crime. therefore Lantaruban and his friends were eager to exact revenge on the king. In 1493 CE, Lantaruban and his friends were engaged on some repairs in the Royal Palace. While coming for work, Lantaruban hid a spear inside the hollow space of one bamboo. When Suhenpha came to inspect the progress of the work, Lantaruban stabbed the king to death with the spear(some account say the king was stabbed with pointed bamboo). According to some accounts, the murder was instigated by Khunlung Burhagohain. Suhenpha had three sons. The eldest among them, Supimpha will succeed as the king of Ahom kingdom.

== Character and legacy ==
Suhenpha’s reign showed the continuation of the policy of expansion of Ahom kingdom. His conflict with the Kacharis proves the fact that the Ahoms wanted to expand their territory, in expense of their neighbouring kingdoms. Though Suhenpha suffered defeat in the hands of Kacharis, the conflict which he started will be continued by his grandson Suhungmung, who will conduct successful military operations against the Kacharis and the Chutiyas extending the boundaries of Ahom kingdom. He also seem to be very strict administrator, owing to which persons found guilty of criminal activities cannot escape punishment, but unfortunately this very quality of him made enemies among some influential people of the court, who then plotted his assassination.

== See also ==
- Ahom Dynasty
- Ahom Kingdom
- Assam
- Assassination
- Kachari kingdom
- Nagaland
- Regicide
- Sibsagar district
- Singarigharutha ceremony
- Sukapha
- Chutiya kingdom
