= Suklenmung =

Ahom king from 1539 to 1552

- Chaopha Swargadeo of Ahom Kingdom

Ahom king
- Reign: 1539–1552
- Predecessor: Suhungmung
- Successor: Sukhaamphaa
- Born: Ahom Kingdom
- Died: 1552; Ahom Kingdom
- Issue: Sukhaamphaa
Names
- Garhgayaan Roja Suklenmung
- Dynasty: Ahom dynasty
- Father: Suhungmung
- Religion: Ahom religion

Suklenmung (died 1552) was a king of the Ahom kingdom in medieval Assam. Since he established his capital at Garhgaon (which would remain the capital of the Ahom kingdom till the establishment of the Tungkhungia kings), he is also called the Garhgaiya roja in the Buranjis. It was during his reign that Madhabdev and Sankardeva's son-in-law Hari were captured and Hari executed, which precipitated the departure of Sankardeva from the Ahom kingdom.

It is frequently said that the first coins were struck during the reign of Garhgayan Raja, but is merely due to misreading of the Ahom legend on the coins of Chakradhwaj Singha (1663-1669). The first coins of the Ahom kingdom were struck during the Jayadhwaj Singha reign (1648-1663)

== Ascension ==
Suklenmung became the king after Suhungmung, his father and the erstwhile king, was assassinated by one of his servants, Ratiman, in January 1539. Some Buranjis suspect that Suklenmung was behind the plot even though Suklenmung tried to dispel the rumors by having the brothers of Ratiman, the assassin, executed. During the middle of the 16th century, Suklenmung intervened against the Burmese aggression on Mong Kwang, a Shan state in Upper Burma. In return Mong Kwang ruler Chao Siu-Kwei offered his daughter, Nang Sao Seng to the Ahom king.

During his father's reign Suklen (as he was then known) offered the first defense against the Bengal invader Turbak in 1532, which he lost and in which he suffered personal injury grievous enough that he had to be replaced by the Borpatrogohain as the commander of the army.

== Territory ==
Suklenmung consolidated the kingdom's command over the regions captured from the Kachari kingdom, by moving the Baro-Bhuyan in the Kopili River valley closer to the capital. In 1546, the kingdom was invaded by the Koch commander, Chilarai, who advanced along a road constructed in secret by his half-brother, Gohain Kamal (and thus called Gohain Kamal Ali), along the north bank of the Brahmaputra River to establish a camp at Narayanpur in present-day North Lakhimpur district. Suklenmung was able to remove the Koch army from the northbank.

== Administration ==
Suklenmung had the Garhgaon tank excavated, the Naga Ali constructed.
