= Bibhuti Lahkar =

Indian scientist

Bibhuti Prasad Lahkar is an Indian conservationist and ecologist who has researched grassland ecosystems in the Indian state of Assam. He did his PhD on the grasslands of Manas National Park with special reference to the Pygmy hog.

== Research Work ==
His research work has covered diverse areas of grassland ecosystems of Manas National Park and Kaziranga National Park in the state of Assam in India. He was the recipient of a grant from the Rufford Foundation for his work on community conservation in Manas World Heritage site and conservation of the Hoolock Gibbon at Gibbon Wildlife Sanctuary.

== Nominations and awards ==
Lahkar won the IUCN World Heritage Hero Award in 2016 for his outstanding contribution to the Manas World Heritage Site.

== See also ==
- Conservation Biology
