= Handique =

Handique is a surname. Notable people with the surname include:

- Aideu Handique (1920–2002), Indian actress
- Bijoy Krishna Handique (1934–2015), Indian politician
- Krishna Kanta Handique (1898–1982), Indian Sanskrit scholar. Indologist and philanthropist
- Nabanita Handique, Indian politician
- Robin Handique (died 2005), Indian terrorist

== See also ==
- Handique Girls College, a constituent college of the University of Guwahati in Assam, India
