= Buranji =

Class of historical chronicles

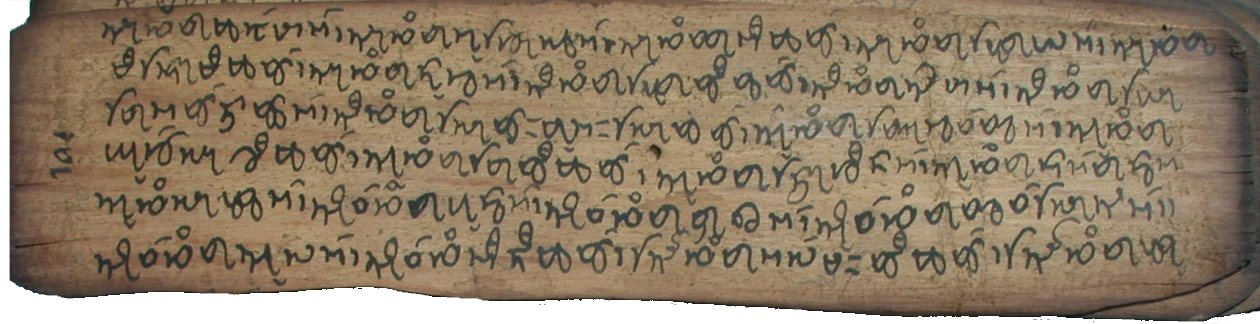
- Ahom script chronicle on sanchipat
- Stylistic origins: Court chronicles, historical records
- Features: Usage of sexagenary cycle
- Popularity: Historically significant, studied for research in Assam history & Tai-Ahom language
- Formats: Sanchipat
- Authors: Ahom kingdom officers
- Publishers: Department of Historical and Antiquarian Studies, Govt. of Assam

Related genres
- Royal chronicles

Base genre
- Kingdom of Assam

Regional scenes
- Northeast India

Local scenes
- Assam

Related topics
- Ahom dynasty, History of Assam

Buranjis (Ahom language: ancient writings) are the state historical chronicles and manuscripts of the Ahom kingdom (fl. 1228–1826). These were written initially in the Ahom Language and from the 16th century additionally in the Assamese language. The Buranjis are an example of historical literature which is rare in India—they bear resemblance to Southeast Asian traditions of historical literature instead. The Buranjis are generally found in manuscript form (locally called puthi), written on sanchipat; a number of these manuscripts have been compiled and published especially in the Assamese language.

They are some of the primary sources of historical information of Assam's medieval past, especially from the 13th century to the colonial times in 1828; and they have emerged as the core sources for historiography of the region for the pre-colonial period. The details in the Buranjis regarding the Ahom-Mughal conflicts agree with those in the Mughal chronicles such as Baharistan, Padshahnama, Alamgirnamah and Fathiyyah; and they also provide additional details not found in these Mughal chronicles.

== Description ==
Buranjis were consulted by the king and high officials of the Ahom kingdom for decision making in state matters. Buranjis are available in manuscript form usually hand-written on oblong pieces of Sanchi bark, though the size and number of folios varies. They are usually densely written on both sides of the folios. Most often the text begins with a legendary account of the establishment of the Ahom kingdom. Though many such Buranjis have been collected, compiled and published, an unknown number of Buranjis are still in private hands.

=== Buranji writing tradition ===
There were two kinds of Buranjis: one maintained by the state (official) and the other maintained by families. The Buranjis themselves claim that the tradition of state Buranjis began with Sukaphaa (r. 1228–1268) who led a group of Shans into the Brahmaputra valley in 1228. On the other hand, the tradition of writing family Buranjis began in the 16th century. The tradition of writing Buranjis survived more than six hundred years well into the British period till the last decade of 1890s, more than a half century after the demise of the Ahom kingdom, when Padmeswar Naobaisha Phukan wrote a Buranji in the old style incorporating substantial details from the colonial times.

Official Buranjis were written by scribes under the office of the Likhakar Barua, and these were based on state papers, such as diplomatic correspondences, spy reports, etc. The Buranjis and the state papers were usually secured in a store or library called Gandhia Bhoral under the supervision of an officer called Gandhia Barua. Generally one of the three ministers of the Ahom state, the Burhagohain, the Borgohain, or the Borpatragohain, was in command of producing Buranjis, but the junior office of Borbarua took over the power in the 18th century.

Family Buranjis were written by nobles or by officials who had themselves participated in those event (or by people under their supervision), sometimes anonymously, though the authorship often becomes known. It became a tradition for respectable Ahom nobles to maintain their own family Buranjis, and as the liberal Ahom polity absorbed new entrants the creation and existence of Buranjis spread to outside the royal archives and to non-Ahom owners. Non-royal Buranjis enjoyed equal parity with royal Buranjis. It also became a tradition to read out parts of family Buranjis during Ahom Chaklang marriage ceremonies.

=== Textual updating practices ===
Existing Buranjis were often updated by rulers or authors. Supplemental folios were often appended with additional material to an existing Buranji, resulting in changes in language and calligraphy. Since these manuscripts were often copied or recopied for duplication before printing became available scribal errors were common. Sometimes specific events were omitted, due to either changes in state policies or scribal mistakes—and Ahom nobles would rectify these omissions by rewriting existing Buranjis which remained exclusive resources for the owners. Rulers, nobles and general scholars thus contributed to the corpus of Buranjis. Sometimes these Buranjis were refreshed and updated with the help of external sources such as those from the Tai-Mau and Khamti polities.

=== Traditional classifications of Buranjis ===
Internally, the Buranji chronicles classify themselves as either Lai-lik Buranji (Assamese: Barpahi Buranji) that are expansive and deal with political histories, and Lit Buranji (Assamese: Katha) which deal with single events, such as Ram Singhar Yuddhar Katha. In the 18th century a third class called Chakaripheti Buranji emerged that dealt with Ahom lineages.

Different reports submitted for archiving also came to be called Buranjis: Chakialar Buranji (reports from chokey, or outpost, officers), Datiyalia Buranji (reports on neighbouring polities from frontier officers), Kataki Buranji (reports from ambassadors or envoys to other polities), Chang-rung Phukonor Buranji (architectural plans and estimates from engineers, dealing with construction of maidams, bridges, temples, roads, ramparts, excavation of tanks, etc.), and Satria Buranji (report on the Satras).

=== Language ===
Buranjis were written in the Ahom language, but since the 16th century they came to be increasingly written in the Assamese language—and Ahom Buranji manuscripts have become rare.

==== Ahom buranjis ====
Buranjis written in the Ahom language span a period of 400 to 600 years and ended two centuries ago when the last of the speakers of the language died out. The Ahom script used in these Buranjis is an older Shan writing system that was not fully developed to include diacritics to denote the different tones or represent proto-Tai voiceless and voiced distinctions. Since the Ahom language has not been spoken for about two hundred years now reading them today involves heavy use of reconstructions.

==== Assamese buranjis ====
The first Assamese Buranjis were written during the reign of Suhungmung (r. 1497–1539). A manuscript called Swarga Narayan Maharajar Akhyan, included in the published compilation Deodhai Asam Buranji, is dated 1526 and considered as the oldest Assamese Buranji. The language of the Assamese Buranjis, on the other hand, formed the template for the standard literary language in the late-19th century. Assamese Buranjis used the Garhgaya style of writing—one of three different styles of the Bengali-Assamese script prevalent between the 17th and 19th centuries in Assam. The Assamese of the Buranjis forms its own standard, and is a close precursor of the modern Assamese standard.

Even though the Indo-Aryan rooted word for history is itihash derived from the class of written records called Itihasa, the word buranji is used instead for "history" in the Assamese language.

=== Loss ===
During the reign of Rajeswar Singha (r. 1751–1769), Kirti Chandra Borbarua had many Buranjis destroyed because he suspected they contained information on his lowly birth.

Much of the official Buranjis have been lost due to acts of nature, war, and a major part of the official Buranjis was lost during the 19th century Burmese invasion of Assam.

== Buranjis in historiography ==
The Buranji's contained within themselves the instinct of historiography. Nevertheless they were written for state purposes of the Ahom kingdom, and they served primarily the interests of the Ahom dynasty followed by those of the courtiers and they were not the records of the people in general. Nevertheless, the practice of writing Buranjis in the older tradition survived the downfall of the Ahom kingdom and persisted till the 1890s. Subsequently, Buranjis themselves became sources for new historiography.

=== Pre-colonial ===
John Peter Wade, a medical officer of the East India Company, accompanied Captain Welsh in his expedition into the Ahom kingdom (1792–1794) to put down the Moamoria rebellion. He wrote his report, and from his notes, published his work Memories of the Reign of Swargee Deo Gowrinath Singh, Late Monarch of Assam some time after 1796. During his stay in Guwahati he encountered the king's scholar-bureaucrats and was shown a copy of an Ahom Buranji and he took the help of Ahom priests to translate the preamble into English. Saikia (2019) suggests that Wade eventually translated three discrete Assamese Buranjis, though it is not known which ones, or who his Assamese collaborators were.

=== Colonial ===
The Ahom kingdom came under East India Company rule in 1826 following the First Anglo-Burmese War and the Treaty of Yandaboo, in which the invading Burmese military was pushed away. In 1833 the EIC established a protectorate under a past Ahom king, Purandar Singha. Following his instructions Kashinath Tamuli-Phukan wrote Assam Buranji in 1835 before the protectorate was dismantled. Buranji writing continued among remnant and scions of past Ahom officialdom, the chief among them was Harakanta Barua who expanded Kashinath Tamuli-Phukan's Buranji, and Padmeshwar Naobaisha Phukan who wrote Assam Buranji the 1890s—the last Buranji written in the older tradition.

In parallel a newly emerging colonial elite began historiography in styles that departed from the Buranji style, but still were called Buranjis. In 1829 Haliram Dhekial Phukan, an erstwhile Ahom officer who successfully transitioned into British officialdom, published Assam Desher Itihash yani ("or") Assam Buranji—written in a hybrid Assamese, Sanskrit, and Bengali language, it drew deeply from the traditional Buranji material and format, but broke away from it by being mindful of early Indian historiographic traditions. Gunabhiram Barua's work Assam Buranji (1887) too departed significantly from the Buranji style though Maniram Dewan's Buranji-Bibekratna hewed much closer.

==== Gait's A History of Assam ====
In 1894 Charles Lyall, the then Chief Commissioner of Assam and a keen ethnologist, charged Edward Gait, a colonial officer and a keen historian, to research Assam's pre-colonial past. Gait implemented an elaborate plan to collect local historical sources: coins, inscriptions, historical documents, quasi-historical writings, religious works and traditions; and created a team of native collaborators from among his junior colonial officers—Hemchandra Goswami, Golap Chandra Barua, Gunahash Goswami, Madhab Chandra Bordoloi, and Rajanikanta Bordoloi among others. Among Buranjis, he collected six Ahom-language manuscripts and eleven Assamese-language manuscripts. (Note: The chief Buranjis used in A History of Assam, from Gait's Introduction to the first edition: Ahom: 1. From the earliest times to the end of the Ahom rule; 2. From the earliest times to the end of Mir Jumla's invasion in 1663; 3. From the earliest times to 1695; 4. From the earliest times to 1764; 5. From the earliest times to 1681; 6. From the earliest times to 1810; Assamese: 1. From the earliest times to end of Ahom rule; 2. From 1228 to 1660; 3. From 1228 to 1714; 4. From 1497 to 1714; 5. From 1598 to 1766. Deals very fully with Rudra Singha's reign; 6. From 1681 to 1790; 7. From 1790 to 1806; 8. An account of the tribute paid to Mir Jumla; 9. An account of the relations with Muhammaddans immediately following Mir Jumla's invasion; 10. An account of the Moamarias; 11. An account of the political geography of Assam in the 17th century.) He charged Golap Chandra Barua to learn the Ahom language from a team of Ahom priests who purportedly knew the language.

Gait devised a method to check for historicity—he first convinced himself that Golap Barua did learn the language. He then checked for consistency within the Ahom and the Assamese Buranji manuscripts and with sources from Mughal sources that were available at that time. He further collated all the dates available in the Buranjis and checked them against those in the 70 Ahoms coins, 48 copper plates, 9 rock, 28 temple and 6 canon inscriptions that he had collected. Thus convinced with the historicity of the Buranjis, A History of Assam was finally published in 1906.

Gait's A History of Assam did not follow the colonial mode of historiography—it used the Buranjis sympathetically, and it avoided the ancient/medieval/modern periodisation then common in Indian historiography. It elevated the stature of the Buranjis as trusted and reliable historical sources. The ready acceptance of the historicity of Buranjis, both by native and British researchers, was in sharp contrast to the reception of other pre-colonial documents, such as the kulagranthas of Bengal.

==== Nationalist response—Kamarupa Anusandhan Samiti ====
The Buranji-based A History of Assam came under criticism from nationalists represented by the Kamarupa Anusandhan Samiti (English: Assam Research Society), that emerged in 1912 amidst the annual convention of the Uttar Bangia Sahitya Parishad (English: North Bengal Literary Society). The society consisted of mostly Sanskrit scholars interested in the study of old inscriptions, and a dominant section of it was Bengali. Foremost among these scholars was Padmanath Bhattacharya, professor of Sanskrit and History at Cotton College, who critiqued Gait on coloniality, his basic flaws in the use of historical evidence, and his fundamental historical assumptions, primarily Gait's ignoring the pre-Ahom period. Bhattacharya's 1931 work Kamarupa Sasanawali formed the standard for studying pre-Ahom Kamarupa. This effort ultimately resulted in Kanaklal Barua's Early History of Kamarupa (1933) a seminal work that emerged as an authoritative alternative to Gait's historiography. Ignoring the tribal genealogy of Assam, this work focused on myths and legends from Sanskrit epics and inscriptions and Assam's Hindu past, departed strongly from Gait's work, and placed Assam in the cultural and political history of India.

Padmanath Bhattacharya's 1931 Kamarupa Sasanavali itself became the target of criticism—from Assamese nationalists such as Laksminath Bezbaruah for failing to differentiate Assamese and Bengali. He was also criticised for correcting the Sanskrit while transcribing sources; and in 1978 Mukunda Madhav Sharma reported that the errors in Sanskrit in the inscriptions displayed that alongside Sanskrit there were Austroasiatic and Tibeto-Burman languages being used in Kamarupa as well as a middle indo-Aryan local prakrit that was progressing towards the modern Assamese language. In 1981 the Assam Publication Board republished a Kamarupa Sasanawvali, compiled and edited by Dimbeswar Sharma, without acknowledging the 1931 edition.

==== Sarkar—History of Aurangzib ====
After Gait, Jadunath Sarkar made further critical use of Buranjis for historiography—in the volume III of his tome History of Aurangzib (1916), Jadunath Sarkar used the Buranjis, especially the Buranji from Khunlung and Khunlai, to fill in details of the Koch-Mughal relations during the pre-Mir Jumla II period and to crosscheck the facts given in the Buranji and the Persian chronicles.

==== Department of Historical and Antiquarian Studies ====
The Department of Historical and Antiquarian Studies (DHAS) was established in 1928 for historical research following a government grant sanctioned by J R Cunningham. Among its many primary goals, one was to acquire and archive manuscripts and copies of original documents for further historical research. S K Bhuyan, who was earlier with the KAS, joined DHAS as an honorary assistant director; and under his leadership the DHAS began to systematically collect Buranjis. A team of DHAS office assistants either procured documents by correspondence, or toured local regions to collect, transcribe and archive manuscripts and documents. By 1978 the DHAS had collected 2000 original manuscripts and 300 transcripts.

==== Published Buranjis ====
Though the Buranjis were originally un-printed manuscripts what is commonly understood as Buranjis are the printed ones available today. Many of these printed Buranjis today are reproductions of single manuscripts, while many others were compilations of individual manuscripts arranged in a particular order.

The earliest Buranjis to be seen in print were those published serially in the Orunodoi magazine in the middle of the 19th century; this was followed in the 20th century by publications of single and compiled Buranjis –the first two Buranjis were edited by native collaborators of Edward Gait: the Purani Asam Buranji, edited by Hemchandra Goswami and published by Kamarupa Anusandhan Samita, and Ahom Buranji, a bilingual Ahom-English Buranji translated by Golap Chandra Barua and published in 1930.

==== Published Buranjis—S K Bhuyan ====
Buranjis edited by S K Bhuyan
Year	Name	Manuscripts
1930	Assam Buranji (Note: Author: Harakanta Sadar Amin)	Single
1930	Kamrupar Buranji	Multiple
1932	Tungkhungia Buranji	Multiple
1932	Deodhai Assam Buranji	Multiple
1932	Assamar Padya Buranji	Multiple
1935	Padshah Buranji	Multiple
1936	Kachari Buranji	Multiple
1937	Jayantia Buranji	Multiple
1937	Tripura Buranji	Single
1945	Assam Buranji (Note: Manuscript obtained from: Sukumar Mahanta)	Single
1960	Satsari Buranji	Multiple

S K Bhuyan compiled, collated, and edited a number of single and multiple manuscript Buranjis in Assamese—nine between 1930 and 1938 and one each in 1945 and 1960 most of which were published by the DHAS. Bhuyan and others scholars in Assam regarded Buranjis as important historical elements and he attempted to bring them to the general population directly. Though Bhuyan edited a few single-sourced Buranjis, most of his works were editions of multiple-sources that have been compiled to form a single narrative. Though Bhuyan rearranged the texts in a linear fashion the published texts were true reproductions that maintained the original orthography and syntax with no attempt at interpretation; and he followed a consistent and transparent methodology of numbering paragraphs in all his Buranjis that enabled researchers to easily trace back any portion of the text to the original archived sources. Bhuyan's Buranji narratives could be classed into three themes: Ahom polity, Ahom-Mughal relations, and Ahom-Neighbour relations. Over time, especially in post-colonial Assam, the standard reference to Buranjis were to these easily accessible published Buranjis which came to represent the original manuscript Buranjis. Though Bhuyan's editorial methodology is known his textual criticism is either superficial or not known very well; he filled gaps in the narrative by interpolations from different sources, but the inconsistencies were not addressed in his work.

=== Post-Colonial ===
Following an assurance of financial support from the ICSSR, New Delhi, the Publication Board, Assam, engaged H K Barpujari to edit a multi-volume comprehensive history of Assam covering the prehistoric times to 1947. Barpujari envisioned "that in a project of national importance the best talents of the country need be utilised, and that the volumes should represent the latest researchers on the subject on the model adopted in Indian historical series published by the Cambridge University Press."

Subsequently, Barpujari engaged primarily D C Sircar, among others, to write on the period when Kamarupa was prevalent, which was of particular interest to the Kamarupa Anusandhan Samiti historians; and primarily Jagadish Narayan Sarkar among others, to write on the medieval period. Sarkar had earlier used the Buranjis as source for a number of his past works, but the scope of the present work included a comprehensive historiography—and the choice fell on him because of his command over Persian, Assamese, Bengali etc. and his familiarity with sources in these languages.

==== Buranjis in Comprehensive History of Assam ====
According to Sarkar (1992) the Ahom Buranji from Khunlung and Khunlai, the Buranji used in 1916 by Jadunath Sarkar, provides accurate details and chronology of the Ahom-Mughal interactions and that they agree with the information found in the Baharistan, Padshahnama, Alamgirnamah and Fathiyyah; further it provides additional details on the quick changes in the Ahom and Mughal fortunes in the post Mir Jumla period which are not available in the Persian sources. The information in this manuscript is supplemented by those in the Ahom Buranji which was edited, translated, and eventually published by G C Barua in 1930. The Purani Asam Buranji, edited by H C Goswami and published by KAS in 1922, too provided information not found elsewhere; it uniquely provides details on the economic aspects of Mughal imperialism. These three Buranjis together provide exhaustive and minute details in the Ahom-Mughal relationship—that agree with each other and also with the Persian sources generally. Among other Buranjis, the Asam Buranji from Khunlung to Gadadhar Simha follows the style of Purani Asam Buranji but provides additional details and elaborations in certain sections.

The Buranji obtained from Sukumar Mahanta (published 1945) has details on earlier invasions from Bengal—Turbak, Alauddin Husain Shah, etc.—and specifically has information on social, religious, and administrative changes during the period this Buranji covered, which was from the earliest rulers to Gadadhar Singha (r. 1681–1696).

== Textual relationships of some Buranjis ==
The first Buranji to be printed was Assam Buranji by Kashinath Tamuli Phukan, which was published by the American Baptist Mission in 1848. Kashinath Tamuli Phukan wrote this Buranji under the instructions of the then Ahom king Purandar Singha (fl. 1832–1838) and his minister Radhanath Barbarua. Kashinath Tamuli Phukan's Buranji was further expanded, in the Buranji tradition, by Harakanta Baruah (1818–1900) when he was an officer of the British colonial government using material from his personal manuscript library. The Harakanta Baruah version was edited in its near-original form by S K Bhuyan and published by DHAS in 1930 as Assam Buranji.

The earliest Ahom-language Buranjis published was one that covered the period from Khunlung-Khunlai to the death of Sutingphaa in 1648—its translation in Assamese language appeared in the magazine Orunodoi from 1850-1852 in serial form under the name Purani Asam Buranji. The text from Orunodoi was later compiled and edited by S K Bhuyan and included in the 1931 published Deodhai Asam Buranji. S K Bhuyan reports that this translation from the original Ahom Buranji to Assamese was believed to have been done by an Ahom scholar named Jajnaram Deodhai Barua who flourished soon after 1826. A earlier Assamese translation of the same original Ahom Buranji was discovered soon after, which was written in an older form of Assamese but also with more details. The later translation had Saka equivalents in parentheses to the Ahom laklis which were compared to and cross-checked against the one compiled earlier by Gait.

The first Buranji published in the Ahom language occurred in the year 1930 when the manuscript that Golap Chandra Barua had translated into English during his employ ender Edward Gait was published. Golap Chandra Barua did not know the Ahom language himself, but he taught himself the language and took help of Deodhai scholars who knew the language. The Buranji was published with Ahom and the corresponding English translation in parallel columns. The original manuscript was divided into six chapters, without paragraphs or regular sentence endings. Barua reports that he demarcated paragraphs and sentences according to his discretion. The same manuscript was translated into standard Thai language from the microfilm copy of the original manuscript by Renu Wichasin after a careful study of the currently dead Ahom language.

== A selected list of Buranjis ==
A selected list of Buranjis
Name	Author	1st Edition	Editor/Translator	Publisher
Kachari Buranji		1936	S K Bhuyan	DHAS
Jayantia Buranji		1937	S K Bhuyan	DHAS
Assam Buranji	Harakanta Sadar Amin	1930	S K Bhuyan	DHAS
Kamrupar Buranji		1930	S K Bhuyan	DHAS
Deodhai Assam Buranji		1932	S K Bhuyan	DHAS
Tungkhungia Buranji	Srinath Duara Barbarua	1932	S K Bhuyan	DHAS
Asamar Padya Buranji	Dutiram Hazarika and Visvesvar Vaidyadhipa	1932	S K Bhuyan	DHAS
Tripura Buranji	Ratna Kandali and Arjun Das (1724)	1938	S K Bhuyan	DHAS
Assam Buranji		1938	S K Dutta	DHAS
Assam Buranji	(Sukumar Mahanta)	1945	S K Bhuyan	DHAS
Assam Buranji Sara	Kashinath Tamuli Phukan	1944	P C Choudhury	DHAS
Ahom Buranji		1930	Golap Chandra Barua (trans. English)	
Ahom Buranji		1996	Renu Wichasin (trans. Thai)	
Purani Asam Buranji		1922	Hem Chandra Goswami	KAS
Satsari Assam Buranji (Note: Collection of seven old Buranjis.)		1960	S K Bhuyan	GU
Padshah Buranji		1935	S K Bhuyan	KAS
