= Suhungmung =

Serhungmerng
- Tsaopha Swarganarayana Of Ahom Kingdom
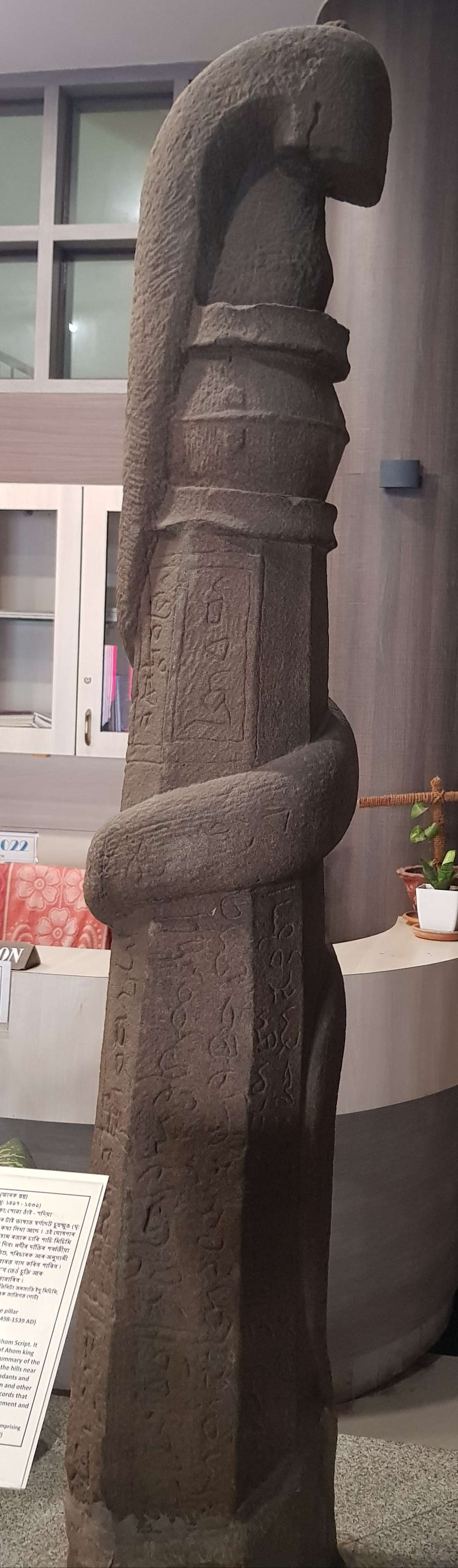
- Serpent pillar, containing the first inscription of Swarganarayan Suhunmung

Ahom King
- Reign: 1497 CE to 1539 CE
- Predecessor: Supimphaa
- Successor: Suklenmung
- Issue: Suklenmung; Syureng; Syukhreng; Syuting
Names
- Dihingia Roja Suhungmung
- Dynasty: Ahom dynasty
- Father: Supimphaa
- Religion: Ahom religion

Suhungmung (r. 1497–1539), or Dihingia Roja was one of the most prominent Ahom Kings who ruled at the cusp of Assam's medieval history. His reign broke from the early Ahom rule and established a multi-ethnic polity in his kingdom. Under him the Ahom Kingdom expanded greatly for the first time since Sukaphaa, at the cost of the Chutia and the Dimasa kingdoms. He also successfully defended his kingdom against Muslim invasions, first by a general called Bar Ujjir and another by Turbak Khan. During his time, the Khen dynasty collapsed and the Koch dynasty ascended in the Kamata kingdom. His general, Ton-kham, pursued the Muslims up to the Karatoya river, the western boundary of the erstwhile Kamarupa Kingdom, the farthest west an Ahom military force had ventured in its entire six hundred years of rule.

He was the first Ahom king to adopt a Hindu title, Swarganarayana, indicating a move towards an inclusive polity; and Ahom kings came to be known as the Swargadeo (literal meaning: Lord of the Heavens) which is the Assamese translation of Ahom word Chao-Pha. He is also called the Dihingia Raja, because he made Bakata on the Dihing River his capital. Serhungmerng was the last progenitor Ahom king (all subsequent kings were his descendants).

== Expansion ==
Under Suhungmung the Ahom Kingdom acquired a vision of an extended polity and consolidated rule. He began by suppressing the revolt of the Aitonia Nagas in 1504 and making them accept Ahom overlordship. As he embarked on military expeditions he organized the first recorded survey of the adult population in 1510 to consolidate and reorganize the militia. He annexed Habung, a Chutia dependency in 1512 and later in 1523-24, the rest of the Chutia Kingdom.

=== Against Chutia Kingdom ===
As Suhungmung had annexed Panbari of Habung (previously a Chutia principality) in 1512, the Chutia king Dhirnarayan attacked the Ahoms at Dikhoumukh the next year, but was unsuccessful. The Chutias again attacked the Ahoms in 1520 and occupied the areas up to Namdang and Mungkhrang. In 1522, the Ahoms fought back, re-occupied their lost territories and erected a fort at Dibrumukh (Dibrugarh). Although, Nitipal tried to attack the fort the following year, he was unsuccessful. Suhungmung then extended the Ahom Kingdom to the mouth of the Tiphao River, where a new fort was constructed. The Chutias fortified Sadiya but they were soon defeated. The Chutias were pursued further and their king and prince were killed in battle. Upon annexing the Chutia territories, the Ahoms came in contact with hill tribes like Miris, Abors, Mishmis and Daflas. Suhungmung established the office of the Sadiyakhowa Gohain and gave charge to Phrasengmung Borgohain to look after the newly acquired Sadiya region. The rest of the newly acquired territories were divided among the Buragohain and Borgohain, while new offices were created to administer the country more efficiently. These included Thao-mung Mung-teu (Bhatialia Gohain) was made the first with headquarters at Habung (Lakhimpur), Thao-mung Ban-lung (Banlungia Gohain) at Banlung (Dhemaji), Thao-mung Mung-klang (Dihingia gohain) at Dihing (Dibrugarh and northern Sibsagar) and Chaolung Shulung at Tiphao (northern Dibrugarh). In 1527, a new ministerial position named Borpatrogohain was created and Konsheng was given charge. Though this was not the end of the conflict it brought to an end the first major expansion of the Ahom Kingdom.

=== Against Kachari Kingdom ===
In 1526, Suhungmung marched against the Kachari Kingdom. In 1531 Khunkhara, the Kachari king, sent forces under his brother Detcha to drive the Ahoms away from Marangi but the Kachari army was defeated and their commander killed. The Kacharis were pursued up to the capital Dimapur and Khunkhara had to flee. Suhungmung established a Kachari prince, Detsung, as the Kachari king. But Detsung rose in revolt in a few years, and the Ahoms pursued him till Jangmarang where he was killed. The Kachari Kingdom abandoned Dimapur permanently and established their new capital at Maibong. Unlike the Chutia Kingdom, Suhungming did not take direct possession of the Kachari Kingdom.

=== Muslim invasions ===
The first Muslim invasion of the Ahom Kingdom occurred in 1527, but it was defeated and pushed back to the Burai River. A few years later, there was another attempt when a commander advanced up the Brahmaputra in fifty vessels. This too was defeated. In yet another expedition, the Borpatragohain slain the commander, Bit Malik, and captured cannons and guns. The most successful among these initial raids on the Ahom Kingdom was the one led by Turbak.

Turbak, a Gaur commander, advanced against the Ahom Kingdom in April 1532 with a large force. He first faced Suklen, Suhungmung's son, at Singri. In this battle Suklen was defeated and wounded and the Ahoms retreated to Sala. The Ahoms again faced reverses at Sala and some other expeditions thereafter, but won the first significant victory in March 1533 when a naval force was defeated with heavy losses to Turbak's forces. This led to a period of stalemate with the two armies encamped on opposite banks of the Dikrai River.

The Ahoms finally attacked the invaders and defeated them in a number of battles. Nang Mula was also martyred in this battle. In the final battle fought near the Bharali River, Turbak and another Muslim general Hussain Khan who had come to reinforce him were killed and his army was pursued till the Karatoya river in present-day North Bengal. The captured soldiers subsequently became the first significant Muslim population of the Ahom Kingdom. They were called Garia since they were from Gaur, and the appellation was later extended to all Muslims. This population finally became well known as expert brass craftsmen.

The Buranjis mention the first use of firearms by the Ahoms in these battles.

== Death ==
Suhunmung met his death in 1539 as a result of a conspiracy hatched by his eldest son Suklenmung who was highly dissatisfied with his father's disgraceful act of marrying the daughter of a Sonari (goldsmith) and making her the Borkonwari (Seniormost Queen). Suhungmung was assassinated by his servant, Ratiman as he was asleep. It is suspected that Suhungmung's son Suklenmung along with Suhungmung's Kachari princess, who became the next king, was responsible for the death.

== Descendants ==
Suhungmung had four sons. The eldest, Suklen, who succeeded him, was established as the Tipam Raja. His second son, Suleng (also spelled Sureng and sometimes called Deoraja), was established as the Charing Raja. Though Suleng himself did not become a king, some of his descendants enjoyed kingship for some time. The third son, Suteng, was established as the Namrupiya Raja, and his descendants established the Tungkhungia line. The fourth son, Sukhring, also called Dop Raja, remained without any estate.

- Suhungmong
  - Suklenmung (Tipam Raja)
    - Sukhaamphaa (Khora Raja)
      - Susenghphaa (Pratap Singha)
        - Namrupiya raja Tailai
          - Sujinphaa (Sur Singha/ Arjun konwar)
        - Suramphaa (Bhoga Raja)
        - Sutingphaa (Noriya Raja)
          - Sutamla (Jayadhwaj Singha)
  - Suleng (Deoraja) (Charing)
    - ??
      - Supangmung, Chakradwaj Singha
      - Sunyatphaa, Udayaditya Singha
      - Suklamphaa, Ramdhwaj Singha
  - Suteng (Namrup)
    - Saranga Gohain
      - Gobar Roja
        - Gadadhar Singha
          - Rudra Singha
            - Siva Singha
            - Pramatta Singha
            - Mohanmala Maladev Gohain
            - Rajeswar Singha
              - Ratneswar
                - Bijoy Bormura
                  - Brajanath
                    - Purandar Singha
            - Lakshmi Singha
              - Gaurinath Singha
        - Lechai
          - Ayusut
            - Kadamdighala
              - Suklingphaa (Kamaleshwar Singha)
              - Chandrakanta Singha
      - Jambor Gohain Charing Raja
        - Sriram
          - Langal
            - Pirika
              - Baga Konwar Tipam Raja
                - Jogeswar Singha
    - ??
      - Sudoiphaa (Tej Singha)
  - Sukhring (none)

== New offices ==
Suhungmung established new Ahom positions.

- Borpatrogohain is the third of the great Gohains (the others being Burhagohain and Borgohain, instituted by Sukaphaa). The first Barpatra Gohain was an Ahom prince brought up by a Naga chief.
- Sadiakhowa Gohain looked after the Sadia region taken from the Chutias in 1524.
- Marangikhowa Gohain looked after the lower Dhansiri river valley taken from the Kacharis.

== See also ==
- Ahom dynasty
- Ahom kingdom
- Assam
- Singarigharutha ceremony
