= Borpatragohain =

Great Noble of the Ahom Dynasty

Borpatragohain (Ahom: Chao Sheng Lung) was the third of the three great Gohains (counsellors) in the Ahom kingdom. This position was created by Suhungmung Dihingia Raja in the year 1527 when Konsheng was appointed the first Borpatrogohain. The designation was borrowed from Vrihat-patra, the Habung dependent of the Chutia king. The Buranji chronicles mention the Chutia official as Pator-Lung (Lung meaning “Great” in Ahom) who fought alongside Kasitara Barua against Phrasenmung Borgohain and Klinglun Burhagohain in the Ahom-Sutia battle at Dibrugarh.. The Chutia Borpatra official appears to have been retained until the later part of the reign of Suklenmung. He was killed following a rebellion led by a Brahmin official against the king; the rebel Brahmin, however, escaped and fled to Koch Bihar.

The other two counselors of the Ahom kingdom, the Burhagohain and the Borgohain, strongly opposed the creation of this office. However, the king successfully instituted this by claiming that three ministers are now required to stabilize the kingdom. Suhungmung claimed that Konsheng, a formidable warrior was his half-brother who had grown up in a Naga chieftain's house. Since the other two counselors refused to transfer part of the militia (hatimur) they commanded to the new office, Suhungmung transferred non-Ahom militia under his command to the Borpatragohain and part of the Ahom militia from the other two counselors to himself. To placate the aggrieved two counselors, Suhungmung created two additional frontier Gohain positions that were exclusive to the two lineages, and ruled that the Borpatragohain's family could not have any marital relationship with the king's lineage.

In later times, people from non-Ahoms families, like those of Garhgayan Patar and Maran Patar were also made Borpatragohain in later times. The Borpatrogohains administered the region from the Daphla Hills to the Brahmaputra, and between the Gerelua and Pichalua rivers.

== List of Borpatragohains ==
- Kon-Sheng/Kan-Seng
- Klan-Jang
- Ban Jangi
- Laku Borpatragohain
- Banchangia Borpatragohain
- Lai Borpatragohain
- Chereli Borpatragohain
- Bhaga Borpatragohain
- Achuk Borpatragohain
- Kenduguria Sengkong Borpatragohain
- Paramananda Borpatragohain
- Kalugayan Harinath Borpatragohain
- Kenduguria Mrittunjay Borpatragohain
- Redeshwar Borpatragohain
- Maran Borpatragohain
- Kenduguria Rudresvar Borpatragohain

== Bibliography ==
- Gait, Edward (1905) History of Assam, Calcutta
- Barua, Swarna Lata (1993). Last Days of Ahom Monarchy: A History of Assam from 1769-1826. New Delhi: Munshiram Manoharlal Publishers. ISBN 978-81-215-0462-1.
- Guha, Amalendu (December 1983), "The Ahom Political System: An Enquiry into the State Formation Process in Medieval Assam (1228-1714)", Social Scientist, 11 (12): 3–34, doi:10.2307/3516963, JSTOR 3516963
- Barua, G.C. (1939). Ahom Buranji.
- Bhuyan, Surya Kumar (1962). Deodhai Asam Buranji: with several shorter chronicles of Assam (compiled from old Assamese buranjis) (in Assamese).
