= Middle kingdoms of India =

Political entities in the Indian subcontinent from 3rd century BCE - 13th century CE

The Middle Kingdoms of India were the political entities that existed on the Indian subcontinent from 230 BCE to 1206 CE. The period began with the decline of the Maurya Empire and the corresponding rise of the Satavahana dynasty, initiated by Simuka in the 1st century BCE. The “middle” period lasted for over 1,200 years and concluded in 1206 CE with the establishment of the Delhi Sultanate and the gradual decline of the Later Cholas, the last of whom, Rajendra Chola III, died in 1279 CE.

This period encompasses two eras: Classical India, from the Maurya Empire up until the end of the Gupta Empire in 500 CE, and early Medieval India from 500 CE onwards. It also encompasses the era of classical Hinduism, which is dated from 200 BCE to 1100 CE. From 1 CE until 1000 CE, India's economy is estimated to have been the largest in the world, having between one-third and one-quarter of the world's wealth. This period was followed by the late Medieval period in the 13th century.

== The Northwest ==
South Asia circa 150 BCE.

Ptolemy's 10th map of Asia, depicting India within the Ganges, 15th century reproduction

During the 2nd century BCE, the Maurya Empire became a collage of regional powers with overlapping boundaries. The whole northwest attracted a series of invaders between 200 BCE and 300 CE. The Puranas speak of many of these tribes as foreigners and impure barbarians (Mlecchas). First the Satavahana dynasty and then the Gupta Empire, both successor states to the Maurya Empire, attempt to contain the expansions of the successive before eventually crumbling internally due to the pressure exerted by these wars.

The invading tribes were influenced by Buddhism which continued to flourish under the patronage of both invaders and the Satavahanas and Guptas and provides a cultural bridge between the two cultures. Over time, the invaders became "Indianized" as they influenced society and philosophy across the Gangetic plains and were conversely influenced by it. This period is marked by both intellectual and artistic achievements inspired by cultural diffusion and syncretism as the new kingdoms straddle the Silk Road.

=== The Indo-Greeks ===
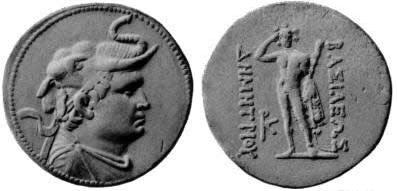
Silver coin of the founder of the Indo-Greek Kingdom, Demetrius (r. c. 205–171 BC).

The Indo-Greek Kingdom covered various parts of the Northwestern South Asia during the last two centuries BCE, and was ruled by more than 30 Hellenistic kings, often in conflict with each other.

The kingdom was founded when Demetrius I of Bactria invaded the Hindu Kush early in the 2nd century BCE. The Greeks in India were eventually divided from the Greco-Bactrian Kingdom centered in Bactria (now the border between Afghanistan and Uzbekistan).

The expression "Indo-Greek Kingdom" loosely describes a number of various dynastic polities. There were numerous cities, such as Taxila, Pushkalavati and Sagala in Pakistan's Punjab. These cities would house a number of dynasties in their times, and based on Ptolemy's Geography and the nomenclature of later kings, a certain Theophila in the south was also probably a satrapal or royal seat at some point.

Euthydemus I was, according to Polybius a Magnesian Greek. His son, Demetrius, founder of the Indo-Greek kingdom, was therefore of Greek descent from his father at minimum. A marriage treaty was arranged for Demetrius with a daughter of Antiochus III the Great, who had partial Persian descent. The ethnicity of later Indo-Greek rulers is less clear. For example, Artemidoros Aniketos (80 BCE) may have been of Indo-Scythian descent. Intermarriage also occurred, as exemplified by Alexander the Great, who married Roxana of Bactria, or Seleucus I Nicator, who married Apama of Sogdia.

During the two centuries of their rule, the Indo-Greek kings combined the Greek and Indian languages and symbols, as seen on their coins, and blended Greek, Hindu and Buddhist religious practices, as seen in the archaeological remains of their cities and in the indications of their support of Buddhism, pointing to a rich fusion of Indian and Hellenistic influences. The diffusion of Indo-Greek culture had consequences which are still felt today, particularly through the influence of Greco-Buddhist art. The Indo-Greeks ultimately disappeared as a political entity around 10 CE following the invasions of the Indo-Scythians, although pockets of Greek populations probably remained for several centuries longer under the subsequent rule of the Indo-Parthians and Kushan Empire.

=== The Yavanas ===
The Yavana or Yona people, literally "Ionian" and meaning "Western foreigner", were described as living beyond Gandhara. Yavanas, Sakas, the Pahlavas and Hunas were sometimes described as mlecchas, "foreigners". Kambojas and the inhabitants of Madra, the Kekeya Kingdom, the Indus River region and Gandhara were sometimes also classified as mlecchas. This name was used to indicate their cultural differences with the culture of the Kuru kingdom and Panchala.

=== The Indo-Scythian Sakas ===
The Indo-Scythians are a branch of the Sakas who migrated from southern Siberia into Bactria, Sogdia, Arachosia, Gandhara, Kashmir, Punjab, and into parts of Western and Central India, Gujarat, Maharashtra and Rajasthan, from the middle of the 2nd century BCE to the 4th century CE. The first Saka king in India was Maues or Moga who established Saka power in Gandhara and gradually extended supremacy over north-western India. Indo-Scythian rule in India ended with the last of the Western Satraps, Rudrasimha III, in 395 CE.

The invasion of India by Scythian tribes from Central Asia, often referred to as the "Indo-Scythian invasion", played a significant part in the history of India as well as nearby countries. In fact, the Indo-Scythian war is just one chapter in the events triggered by the nomadic flight of Central Asians from conflict with Chinese tribes which had lasting effects on Bactria, Kabul, Parthia and India as well as far off Rome in the west. The Scythian groups that invaded India and set up various kingdoms, included, besides the Sakas, other allied tribes, such as the Medes, Scythians, Massagetae, Getae, Parama Kambojas, Avars, Bahlikas, Rishikas and Paradas.

=== The Indo-Parthians ===
The Indo-Parthian Kingdom was founded by Gondophares around 20 BCE. The kingdom lasted only briefly until its conquest by the Kushan Empire in the late 1st century CE and was a loose framework where many smaller dynasts maintained their independence.

=== The Pahlavas ===
The Pahlavas are a people mentioned in ancient Indian texts like the Manusmṛti, various Puranas, the Ramayana, the Mahabharata, and the Brhatsamhita. In some texts the Pahlavas are synonymous with the Pallava dynasty of South India. While the Vayu Purana distinguishes between Pahlava and Pahnava, the Vamana Purana and Matsya Purana refer to both as Pallava. The Brahmanda Purana and Markendeya Purana refer to both as Pahlava or Pallava. The Bhishama Parava of the Mahabharata does not distinguish between the Pahlavas and Pallavas. The Pahlavas are said to be same as the Parasikas, a Saka group. According to P. Carnegy, the Pahlava are probably those people who spoke Paluvi or Pehlvi, the Parthian language. Buhler similarly suggests Pahlava is an Indic form of Parthava meaning "Parthian". In a 4th-century BCE, the Vartika of Kātyāyana mentions the Sakah-Parthavah, demonstrating an awareness of these Saka-Parthians, probably by way of commerce.

=== The Western Satraps ===
South Asia in the 2nd century CE.

The Western Satraps (35–405 CE) were Saka rulers of the western and central part of India (Saurashtra and Malwa: modern Gujarat, southern Sindh, Maharashtra, Rajasthan and Madhya Pradesh states). Their state, or at least part of it, was called "Ariaca" according to the Periplus of the Erythraean Sea. They were successors to the Indo-Scythians and were contemporaneous with the Kushan Empire, which ruled the northern part of the Indian subcontinent and were possibly their overlords, and the Satavahana dynasty of Andhra who ruled in Central India. They are called "Western" in contrast to the "Northern" Indo-Scythian satraps who ruled in the area of Mathura, such as Rajuvula, and his successors under the Kushans, the "Great Satrap" Kharapallana and the "Satrap" Vanaspara. (Note: Kharapallana and Vanaspara are known from an inscription discovered in Sarnath, and dated to the 3rd year of Kanishka, in which they were paying allegiance to the Kushanas.) Although they called themselves "Satraps" on their coins, leading to their modern designation of "Western Satraps", Ptolemy's Geography still called them "Indo-Scythians". Altogether, there were 27 independent Western Satrap rulers during a period of about 350 years.

=== The Kushans ===
The Kushan Empire (c. 1st–3rd centuries) originally formed in Bactria on either side of the middle course of the Amu Darya in what is now northern Afghanistan, Tajikistan and Uzbekistan; during the 1st century CE, they expanded their territory to include the Punjab and much of the Ganges basin, conquering a number of kingdoms across the northern part of the Indian subcontinent in the process. The Kushans conquered the central section of the main Silk Road and, therefore, had control of the overland trade between India, and China to the east, and the Roman Empire and Persia to the west.

Emperor Kanishka was a great patron of Buddhism; however, as Kushans expanded southward toward the Indian subcontinent the deities of their later coinage came to reflect its new Hindu majority.

=== The Indo-Sasanians ===
The rise of new Persian power, the Sasanian Empire, saw them exert their influence into the Indus region and conquer lands from the Kushan Empire, setting up the Indo-Sasanians around 240 CE. They were to maintain their influence in the region until they were overthrown by the Rashidun Caliphate. Afterwards, they were displaced in 410 CE by the invasions of the Hephthalite Empire.

=== The Hephthalite Hunas ===
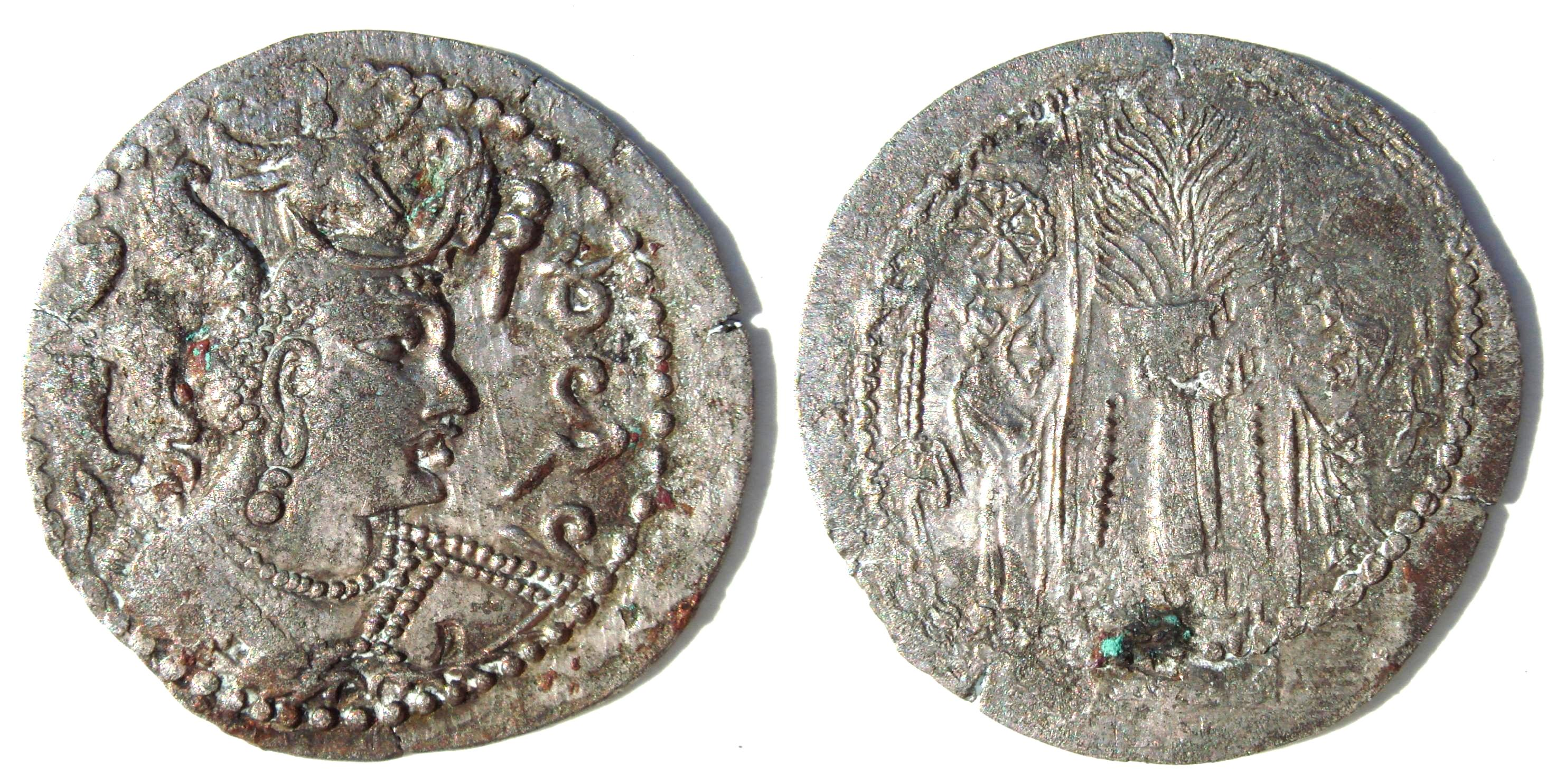
Billon drachma of the Huna King Napki Malka (Afghanistan or Gandhara, c. 475–576).

The Hephthalite Empire was another Central Asian nomadic group to invade. They are also linked to the Yuezhi who had founded the Kushan Empire. From their capital in Bamyan (present-day Afghanistan) they extended their rule across the Indus and North India, thereby causing the collapse of the Gupta Empire. They were eventually defeated by the Sasanian Empire allied with Turkic peoples.

=== The Rais ===
The Rai dynasty of Sindh were patrons of Buddhism even though they also established a huge temple of Shiva in Sukkur close to their capital, Aror.

=== The Gandharan kingdom ===
Gandhāra was an ancient region in the Kabul, Peshawar, Swat, and Taxila areas of what are now northwestern Pakistan and eastern Afghanistan. It was one of 16 Mahajanapada of ancient India.

=== The Karkotas ===
South Asia circa 700 CE.

The Karkota Empire was established around 625 CE. During the eighth century they consolidated their rule over Kashmir. The most illustrious ruler of the dynasty was Lalitaditya Muktapida. According to Kalhana's Rajatarangini, he defeated the Tibetans and Yashovarman of Kanyakubja, and subsequently conquered eastern kingdoms of Magadha, Kamarupa, Gauda, and Kaḷinga. Kalhana also states that he extended his influence of Malwa and Gujarat and defeated Arabs at Sindh. According to historians, Kalhana highly exaggerated the conquests of Lalitaditya.

=== The Kabul Shahis ===
The Kabul Shahi dynasties ruled portions of the Kabul valley and Gandhara from the decline of the Kushan Empire in the 3rd century to the early 9th century. The kingdom was known as the Kabul Shahan or Ratbelshahan from 565 CE–670 CE, when the capitals were located in Kapisa and Kabul, and later Udabhandapura, also known as Hund, for its new capital. In ancient time, the title Shahi appears to be a quite popular royal title in Afghanistan and the northwestern areas of the Indian subcontinent. Variants were used much more priorly in the Near East, (Note: Darius used titles like Kshayathiya, Kshayathiya Kshayathiyanam, etc.) but as well later on by the Sakas, Kushans Hunas, Bactrians, by the rulers of Kapisa/Kabul and Gilgit. In Persian form, the title appears as Kshathiya, Kshathiya Kshathiyanam, Shao of the Kushanas and the Ssaha of Mihirakula (Huna chief). The Kushanas are stated to have adopted the title Shah-in-shahi (Shaonano shao) in imitation of Achaemenid practice. The Shahis are generally split up into two eras—the Buddhist Shahis and the Hindu Shahis, with the change-over thought to have occurred sometime around 870 CE.

== The Gangetic Plains and Deccan ==
Following the demise of the Mauryan Empire, the Satavahanas rose as the successor state to check and contend with the influx of the Central Asian tribes from the Northwest. The Satavahanas straddling the Deccan plateau also provided a link for transmission of Buddhism and contact between the Northern Gangetic plains and the Southern regions even as the Upanishads were gaining ground. Eventually weakened both by contention with the northwestern invaders and internal strife they broke up and gave rise to several nations around Deccan and central India regions even as the Gupta Empire arose in the Indo-Gangetic Plain and ushered in a "Golden Age" and rebirth of empire as decentralized local administrative model and the spread of Indian culture until collapse under the Huna invasions. After the fall of Gupta Empire the Gangetic region broke up into several states temporarily reunited under Harsha then giving rise to the Rajput dynasties. In the Deccan, the Chalukyas arose forming a formidable nation marking the migration of the centers of cultural and military power long held in the Indo-Gangetic Plain to the new nations forming in the southern regions of India.

=== The Satavahana Empire ===
The Sātavāhana dynasty began as feudatories to the Maurya Empire but declared independence with its decline. They were the first Indic rulers to issue coins struck with their rulers embossed and are known for their patronage of Buddhism, resulting in Buddhist monuments from the Ellora Caves to Amaravathi village, Guntur district. They formed a cultural bridge and played a vital role in trade and the transfer of ideas and culture to and from the Gangetic plains to the southern tip of India.

The Sātavāhanas had to compete with the Shunga Empire and then the Kanva dynasty of Magadha to establish their rule. Later they had to contend in protecting their domain from the incursions of Sakas, Yonas and the Pahlavas. In particular their struggles with the Western Satraps weakened them and the empire split into smaller states.

=== The Mahameghavahana dynasty ===
The Mahameghavahanas (c. 250s BCE – 400s CE) was an ancient ruling dynasty of Kaḷinga after the decline of the Mauryan Empire. The third ruler of the dynasty, Khārabēḷa, conquered much of India in a series of campaigns at the beginning of the common era. Kaḷingan military might was reinstated by Khārabēḷa: under Khārabēḷa's generalship, the Kaḷinga state had a formidable maritime reach with trade routes linking it to the then-Simhala (Sri Lanka), Burma (Myanmar), Siam (Thailand), Vietnam, Kamboja (Cambodia), Borneo, Bali, Samudra (Sumatra) and Jabadwipa (Java). Khārabēḷa led many successful campaigns against the states of Magadha, Anga, the Satavahanas and the South Indian regions ruled by the Pandyan dynasty (modern Andhra Pradesh) and expanded Kaḷinga as far as the Ganges and the Kaveri.

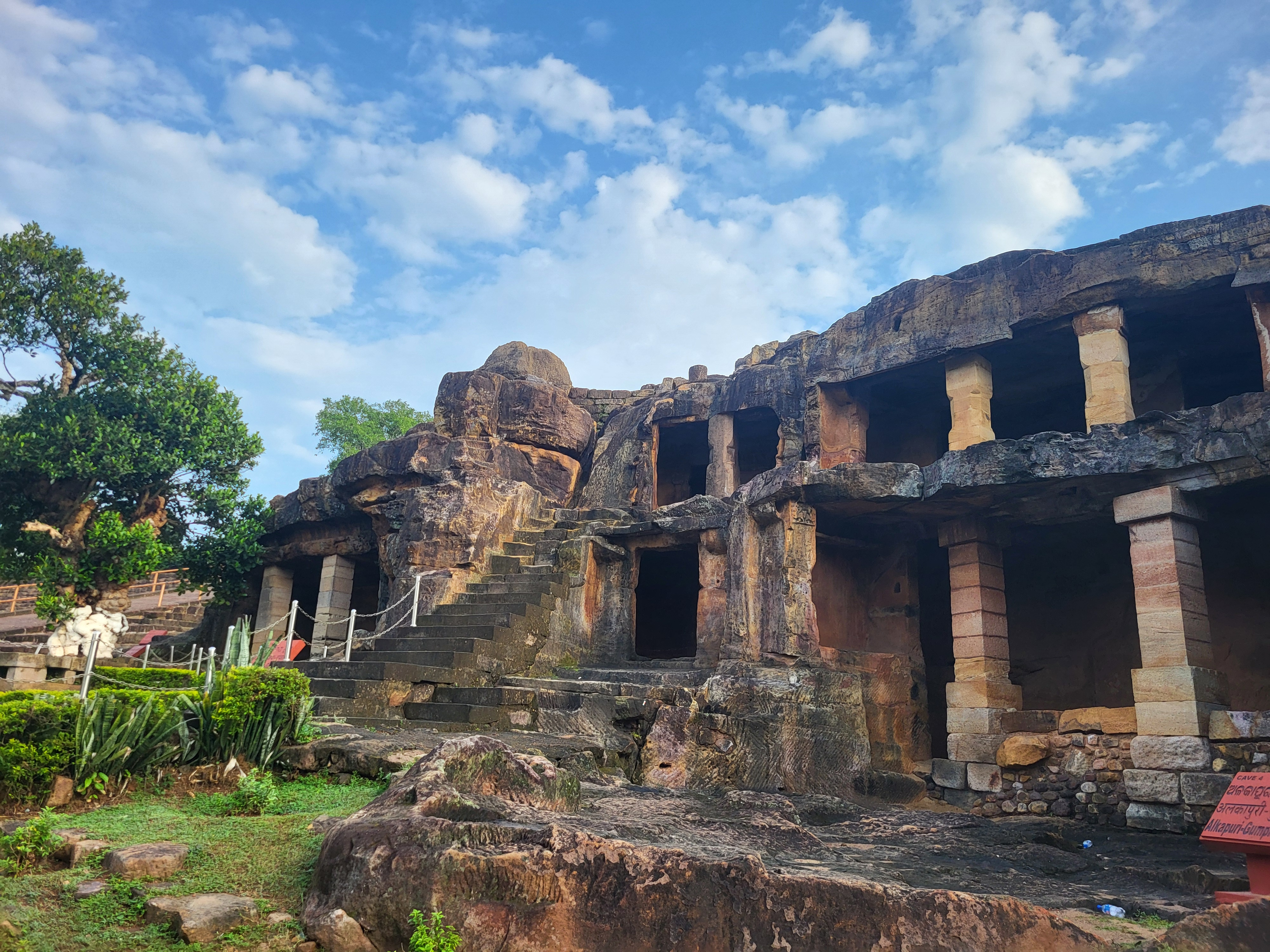
The rock-cut jaina viharas of Khandagiri caves, built under the patronage of Kharavela.

The Kharavelan state had a formidable maritime empire with trading routes linking it to Sri Lanka, Burma, Thailand, Vietnam, Cambodia, Borneo, Bali, Sumatra and Java. Colonists from Kaḷinga settled in Sri Lanka, Burma, as well as the Maldives and Maritime Southeast Asia. Even today Indians are referred to as Keling in Malaysia because of this.

Although religiously tolerant, Khārabēḷa patronised Jainism, and was responsible for the propagation of Jainism in the Indian subcontinent but his importance is neglected in many accounts of Indian history. The main source of information about Khārabeḷa is his famous seventeen line rock-cut Hātigumphā inscription in the Udayagiri and Khandagiri Caves near Bhubaneswar, Odisha. According to the Hathigumpha inscription, he attacked Rajagriha in Magadha, thus inducing the Indo-Greek king Demetrius I of Bactria to retreat to Mathura.

=== The Bharshiva dynasty ===
Before the rise of the Guptas, Bharshiva Kings ruled most of the Indo-Gangetic plains. They perform ten Ashvamedha sacrifices on the banks of Ganga River. Samudragupta mention Naga rulers in his Allahabad pillar.

=== The Vakatakas ===
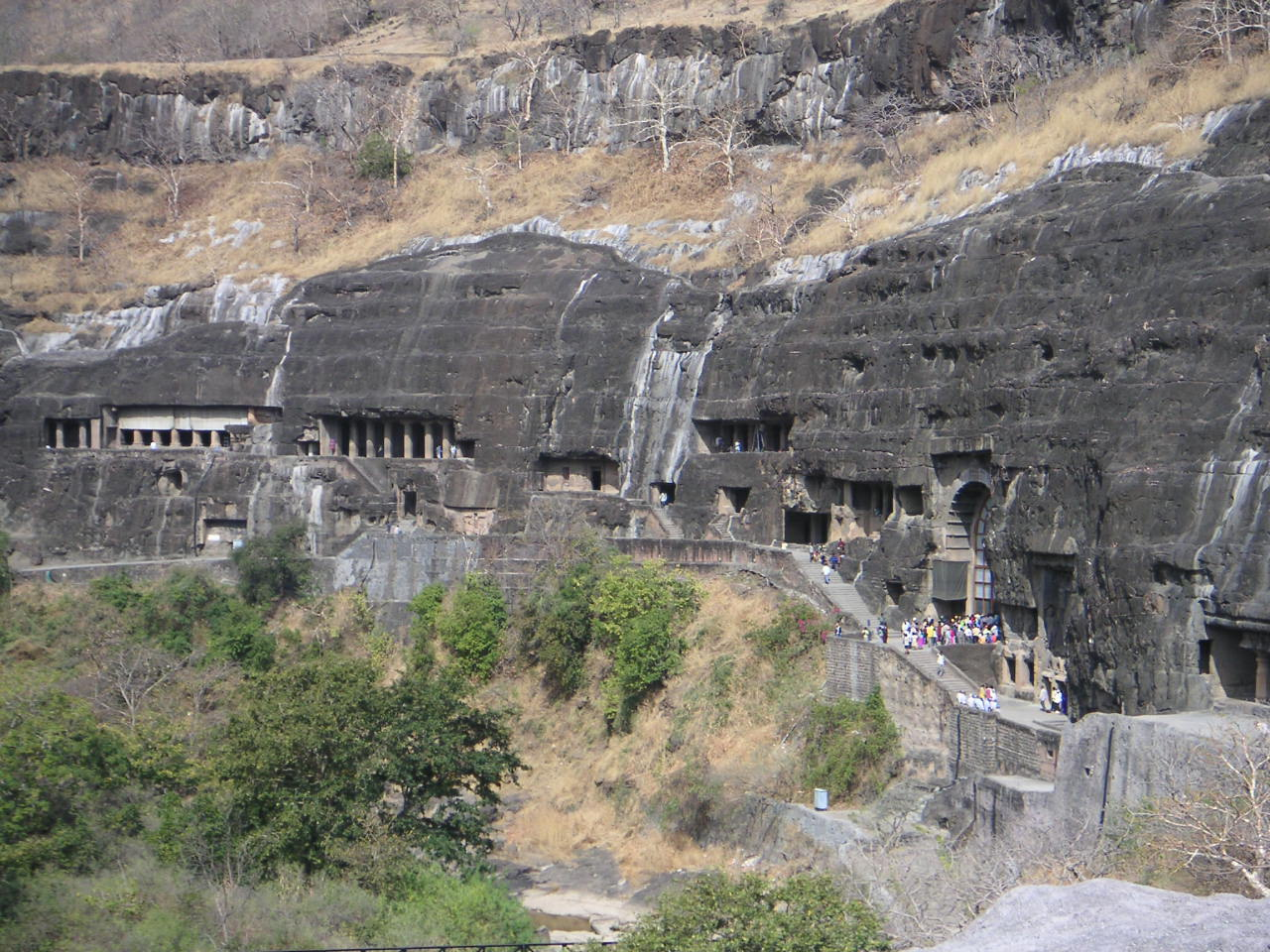
The rock-cut Buddhist viharas and chaityas of Ajanta Caves, built under the patronage of the Vakataka rulers.

The Vakataka Empire was the contemporaries of the Gupta Empire and the successor state of the Satavahanas they formed the southern boundaries of the north and ruled over today's modern-day states of Madhya Pradesh and Maharashtra during the 3rd and 5th centuries. The rock-cut Buddhist viharas and chaityas of Ajanta Caves (a UNESCO World Heritage Site), built under the patronage of the Vakataka rulers. They were eventually overrun by the Chalukyas.

=== The Guptas ===
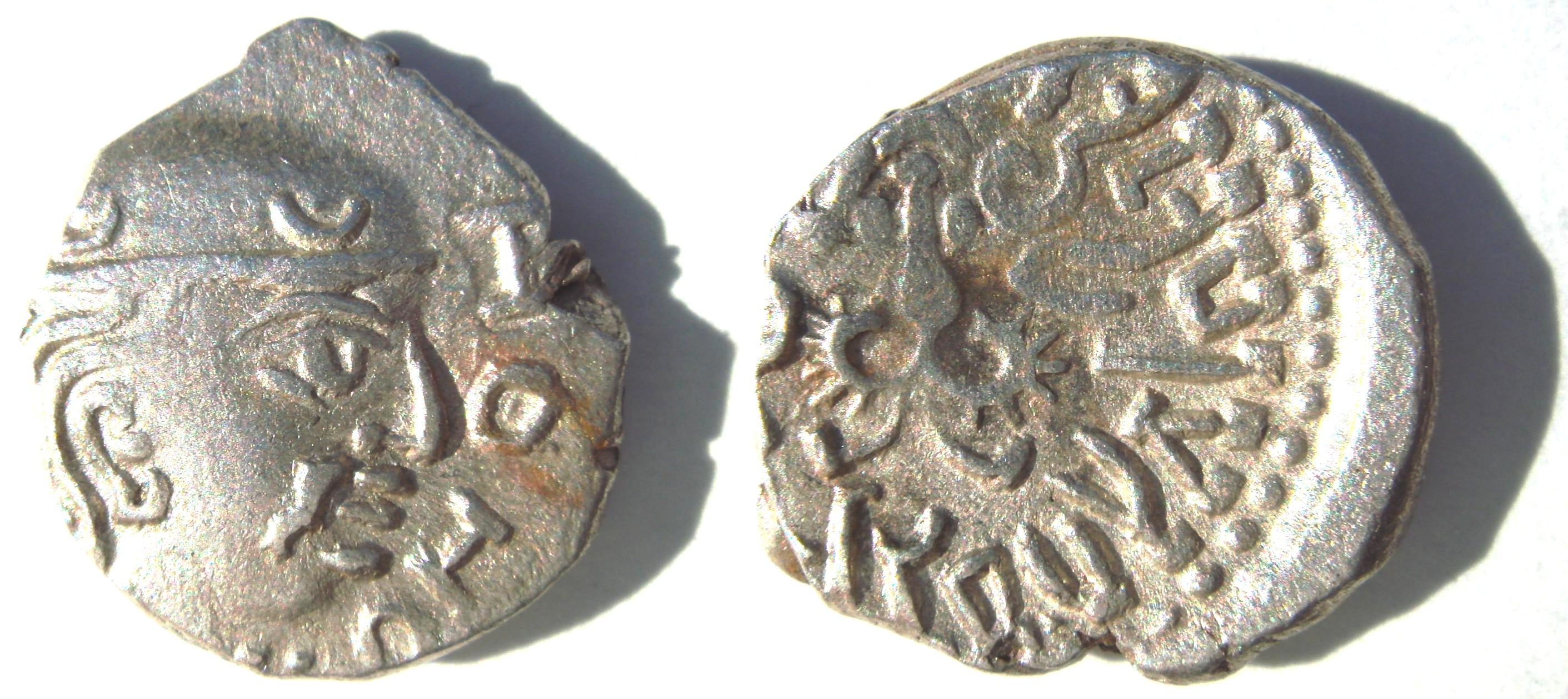
Silver coin of the Gupta King Kumara Gupta I (414–455).

The Classical Age refers to the period when much of the Indian subcontinent was reunited under the Gupta Empire (ca. 320 CE–600 CE). This period is called the Golden Age of India and was marked by extensive achievements in science, technology, engineering, art, literature, logic, mathematics, astronomy, religion and philosophy that crystallized the elements of what is generally known as Hindu culture. The decimal numeral system, including the concept of zero, was invented in India during this period. The peace and prosperity created under Guptas leadership enabled the pursuit of scientific and artistic endeavors in India.

The high points of this cultural creativity is seen in Gupta architecture, sculpture and painting. The Gupta period produced scholars such as Kalidasa, Aryabhata, Varahamihira, Vishnu Sharma, and Vatsyayana who made advances in a variety of academic fields. Science and political administration advanced during the Gupta era. Trade ties made the region an important cultural center and set the region up as a base that would influence nearby kingdoms and regions in Burma, Sri Lanka, and both maritime and mainland Southeast Asia.

The Guptas performed Vedic sacrifices to legitimize their rule, but they also patronized Buddhism, which continued to provide an alternative to Brahmanical orthodoxy. The military exploits of the first three rulers - Chandragupta I (ca. 319–335), Samudragupta (ca. 335–376), and Chandragupta II (ca. 376–415) —brought much of India under their leadership. They successfully resisted the north-western kingdoms until the arrival of the Hunas who established themselves in Afghanistan by the first half of the 5th century, with their capital at Bamiyan. Nevertheless, much of the Deccan and southern India were largely unaffected by this state of flux in the north.

=== The Harsha Vardhana ===
After the collapse of the Gupta Empire, the gangetic plains fractured into numerous small nations. Harsha of Kannauj was able to briefly bind them together under his rulership as the Empire of Harsha. Only a defeat at the hands of the Chalukyas (Pulakeshin II) prevented him from expanding his reign south of the Narmada River. This unity did not last long beyond his reign and his empire fractured soon after his death in 647 AD.

=== Later Guptas ===
The Later Gupta dynasty, also known as the Later Guptas of Magadha, were the rulers of the Magadha region and partly of Malwa from the 6th and 8th centuries CE. The Later Guptas emerged after the disintegration of the Imperial Guptas as the rulers of Magadha and Malwa however, there is no evidence to connect the two dynasties and the Later Guptas may have adopted the -gupta suffix to link themselves the Imperial Guptas.

=== The Gurjaras ===
Present day Rajasthan was Gurjara area for centuries with capital at Bhilmal (Bhinmal or Srimal), situated nearly 50 miles to the north west of Mount Abu. The Pratihara of Bhinmal moved to Kannuaj on the Ganges at the beginning of the 9th century and transferred their capital to Kannuaj and founded an empire which at its peak was bounded on the east by Bihar, on the west by the lost river, the Hakra, and the Arabian Sea, on the North By the Himalaya and Sutlaj, and on the South by the Jumna and Narmada. The region round Broach, which was offshoot of this kingdom, was also ruled by the Gurjaras of Nandipuri and Gurjaras of Lata.

=== The Vishnukundinas ===
The Vishnukundina Empire was an Indian dynasty that ruled over the Deccan, Odisha and parts of South India during the 5th and 6th centuries carving land out from the Vakataka Empire. The Vishnukundin reign came to an end with the conquest of the eastern Deccan by the Chalukya, Pulakeshin II. Pulakeshin appointed his brother Kubja Vishnuvardhana as Viceroy to rule over the conquered lands. Eventually Vishnuvardhana declared his independence and started the Eastern Chalukya dynasty.

=== The Maitrakas ===
The Maitraka Empire ruled Gujarat in western India from the c. 475 to 767 CE. The founder of the dynasty, Senapati (general) Bhatarka, was a military governor of Saurashtra peninsula under Gupta Empire, who had established himself as the independent ruler of Gujarat approximately in the last quarter of the 5th century. The first two Maitraka rulers Bhatarka and Dharasena I used only the title of Senapati (general). The third ruler Dronasimha declared himself as the Maharaja. King Guhasena stopped using the term Paramabhattaraka Padanudhyata along his name like his predecessors, which denotes the cessation of displaying of the nominal allegiance to the Gupta overlords. He was succeeded by his son Dharasena II, who used the title of Mahadhiraja. His son, the next ruler Siladitya I, Dharmaditya was described by Hiuen Tsang as a "monarch of great administrative ability and of rare kindness and compassion". Siladitya I was succeeded by his younger brother Kharagraha I. Virdi copperplate grant (616 CE) of Kharagraha I proves that his territories included Ujjain.

=== The Gurjara Pratiharas ===
The Gurjara Pratihara Empire (Hindi: गुर्जर प्रतिहार) formed an Indian dynasty that ruled much of Northern India from the 6th to the 11th centuries. At its peak of prosperity and power (c. 836–910 CE), it rivaled the Gupta Empire in the extent of its territory.

Pointing out the importance of the Gurjara Pratihara empire in the history of India Dr. R. C. Majumdar has observed, "the Gurjara Pratihara Empire which continued in full glory for nearly a century, was the last great empire in Northern India before the Muslim conquest." This honour is accorded to the empire of Harsha by many historians of repute but without any real justification, for the Pratihara empire was probably larger, certainly not less in extent rivalled the Gupta Empire and brought political unity and its attendant blessings upon a large part of Northern India. But its chief credit lies in its successful resistance to the foreign invasions from the west, from the days of Junaid. This was frankly recognised by the Arab writers themselves.

Historians of India, since the days of Eliphinstone, has wondered at slow progress of Muslim invaders in India compared to their rapid advance in other parts of the world. Arguments of doubtful validity have often been put forward to explain this unique phenomenon. Now there can be little doubt that it was the power of the Gurjara Pratihara army that effectively barred the progress of the Muslims beyond the confines of Sindh, their first conquest for nearly three hundred years. In the light of later events this might be regarded as the "chief contribution of the Gurjara Pratiharas to the history of India".

=== The Rajputs ===
The Rajput were a Hindu clan who rose to power across a region stretching from the Gangetic plains to the Afghan mountains, and refer to the various dynasties of the many kingdoms in the region in the wake of the collapse of the Sassanid Empire and Gupta Empire and marks the transition of Buddhist ruling dynasties to Hindu ruling dynasties.

==== Katoch Dynasty ====
The Katoch were a Hindu Rajput clan of the Chandravanshi lineage; with recent research suggests that Katoch may be one of the oldest royal dynasties in the world.

==== The Chauhans ====
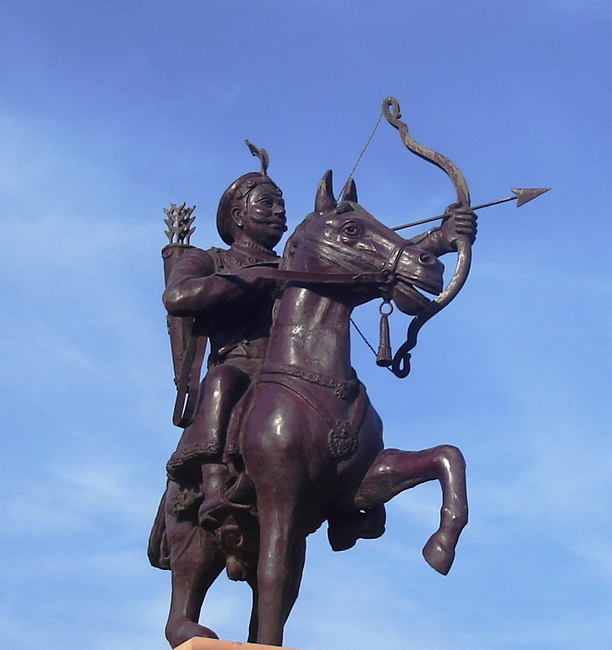
Statue of Prithvi Raj Chauhan at Ajmer

The Chauhan dynasty flourished from the 8th to 12th centuries CE. It was one of the three main Rajput dynasties of that era, the others being Pratiharas and Paramaras. Chauhan dynasties established themselves in several places in North India and in the state of Gujarat in Western India. They were also prominent at Sirohi in the southwest of Rajputana, and at Bundi and Kota in the east. Inscriptions also associate them with Sambhar, the salt lake area in the Amber (later Jaipur) district (the Sakhambari branch remained near lake Sambhar and married into the ruling Gurjara-Pratihara, who then ruled an empire in Northern India). Chauhans adopted a political policy that saw them indulge largely in campaigns against the Chalukyas and the invading Muslim hordes. In the 11th century, they founded the city of Ajayameru (Ajmer) in the southern part of their kingdom, and in the 12th century, the Chauhans captured Dhilika (the ancient name of Delhi) from the Tomaras and annexed some of their territory along the Yamuna River.

The Chauhan Kingdom became the leading state in Northern India under King Prithviraj III (1165–1192 CE), also known as Prithvi Raj Chauhan or Rai Pithora. Prithviraj III has become famous in folk tales and historical literature as the Chauhan king of Delhi who resisted and repelled the invasion by Mohammed of Ghor at the First Battle of Tarain in 1191. Armies from other Rajput kingdoms, including Mewar, assisted him. The Chauhan kingdom collapsed after Prithviraj and his armies faced defeat from Mohammed of Ghor in 1192 at the Second Battle of Tarain.

==== The Kachwaha ====
The Kachwaha originated as tributaries of the preceding powers of the region. Some scholars point out that it was only following the downfall, in the 8th–10th century, of Kannauj (the regional seat-of-power, following the break-up of Harsha's empire), that the Kacchapaghata state emerged as a principal power in the Chambal valley of present-day Madhya Pradesh.

==== The Paramaras ====
The Paramara dynasty was a Rajput dynasty in early Medieval India who ruled over Malwa region in central India. This dynasty was founded by Upendra in c. 800 CE. The most significant ruler of this dynasty was Bhoja who was a philosopher king and polymath. The seat of the Paramara kingdom was Dhara Nagari (the present day Dhar city in Madhya Pradesh state).

==== Chaulukyas ====
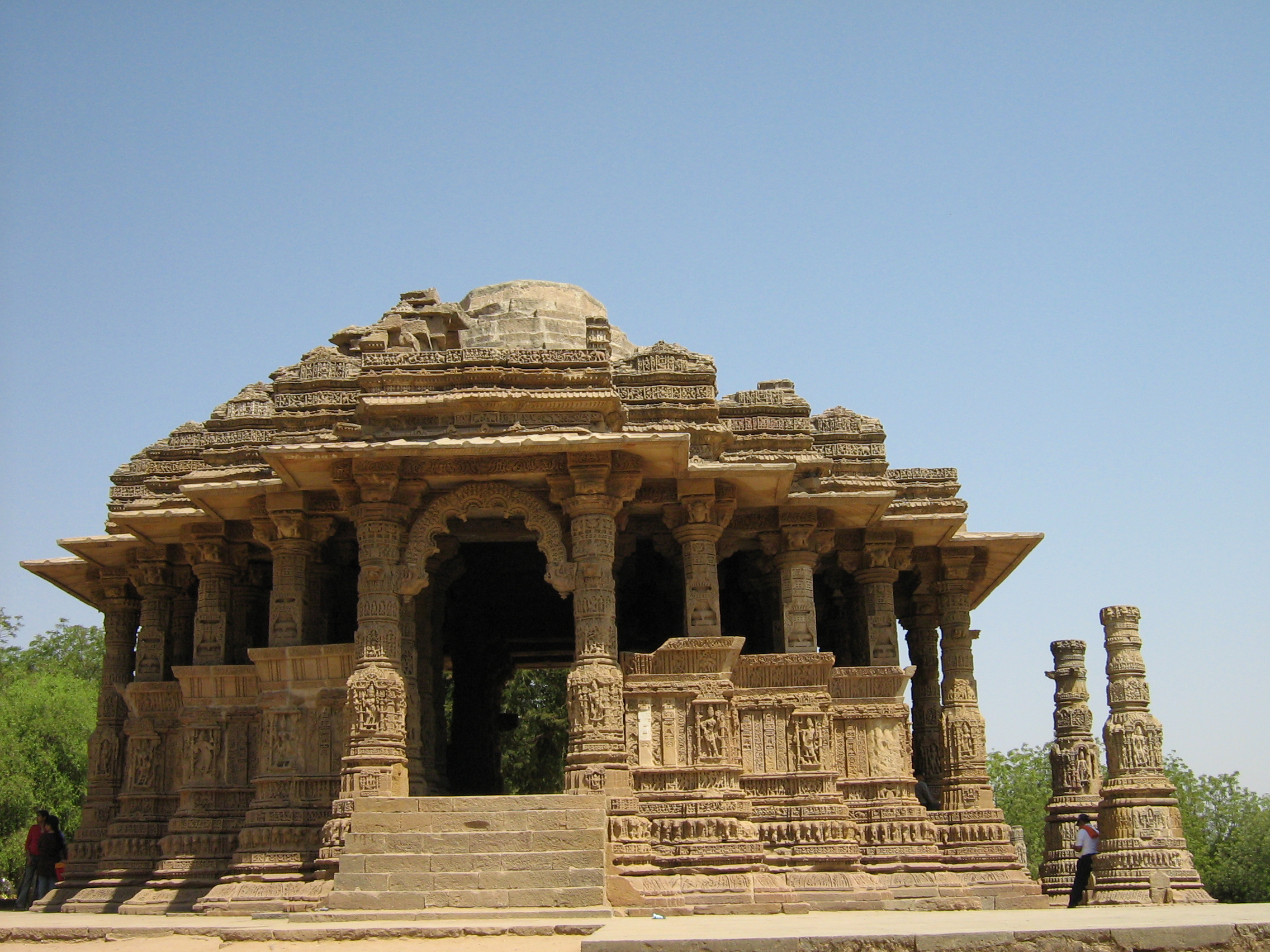
Modhera Sun Temple built by the Chaulukyas.

The Chaulukyas (also called Solankis) was another Rajput dynasty In Gujarat, Anhilwara (modern Patan) served as their capital. Gujarat was a major center of Indian Ocean trade, and Anhilwara was one of the largest cities in India, with population estimated at 100,000 in the year 1000. The Chaulukyas were great patrons of Somnath Temple at Veraval in Saurashtra; Bhima Dev helped rebuild the temple after it was sacked by Mahmud of Ghazni in 1026. His son, Karna, conquered the Bhil king Ashapall or Ashaval, and after his victory established a city named Karnavati on the banks of the Sabarmati River, at the site of modern Ahmedabad.

==== Tomaras of Delhi ====
Tomaras of Delhi was a Rajput Clan during 9th to 12th century. The Tomaras of Delhi ruled parts of the present-day Delhi and Haryana. Much of the information about this dynasty comes from bardic legends of little historical value, and therefore, the reconstruction of their history is difficult. According to the bardic tradition, the dynasty's founder Anangapal Tuar (that is Anangapala I Tomara) founded Delhi in 736 CE. However, the authenticity of this claim is doubtful. The bardic legends also state that the last Tomara king (also named Anangapal) passed on the throne of Delhi to his maternal grandson Prithviraj Chauhan. This claim is also inaccurate: historical evidence shows that Prithviraj inherited Delhi from his father Someshvara. According to the Bijolia inscription of Someshvara, his brother Vigraharaja IV had captured Dhillika (Delhi) and Ashika (Hansi); he probably defeated a Tomara ruler.

==== Gahadavala dynasty ====
The Gahadavala dynasty ruled parts of the present-day Indian states of Uttar Pradesh and Bihar, during the 11th and 12th centuries. Their capital was located at Varanasi in the Gangetic plains.

=== Khayaravala dynasty ===
The Khayaravala dynasty ruled parts of the present-day Indian states of Bihar and Jharkhand, during 11th and 12th centuries. Their capital was located at Khayaragarh in Shahabad district. Pratapdhavala and Shri Pratapa were king of the dynasty according to inscription of Rohtas.

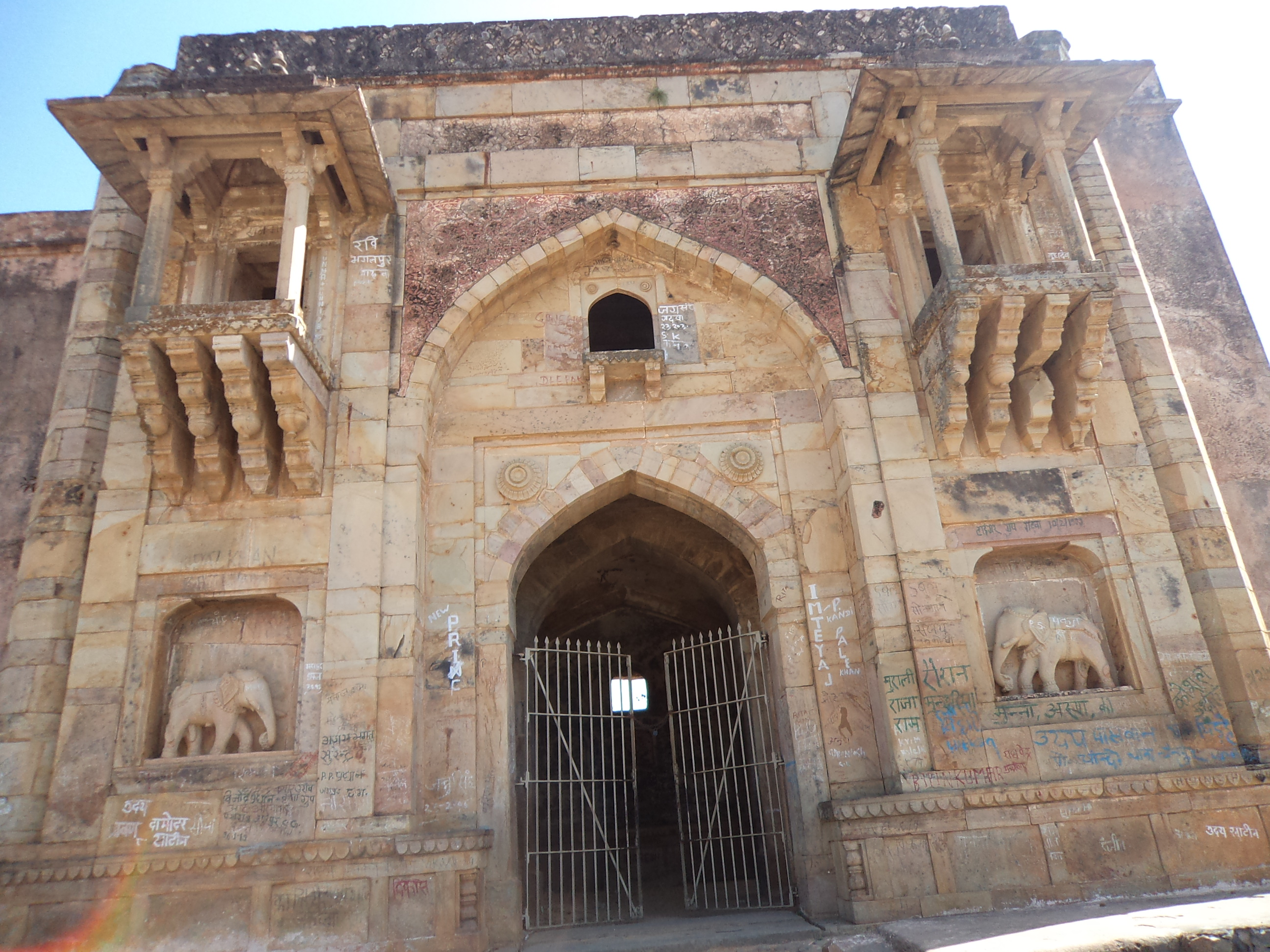
Rohtasgarh Fort

=== The Pratihars ===
Pratihars ruled from Mandore, near present-day Jodhpur, they held the title of Rana before being defeated by Guhilots of Chittore.

=== The Palas ===
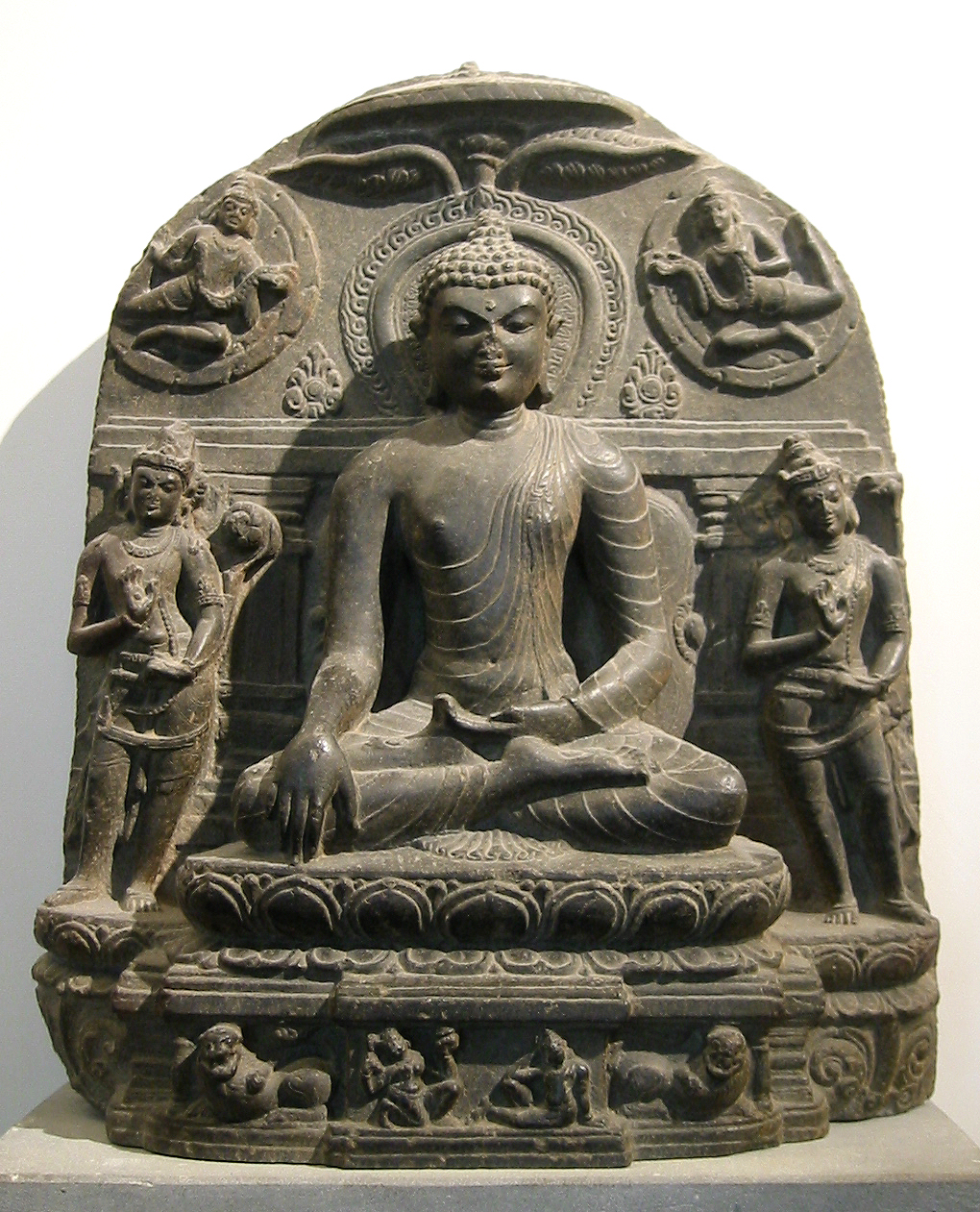
Buddha and Bodhisattvas, 11th century, Pala Empire

Pala Empire was a Buddhist dynasty that ruled from the north-eastern region of the Indian subcontinent. The name Pala (Modern Bengali: পাল pal) means protector and was used as an ending to the names of all Pala monarchs. The Palas were followers of the Mahayana and Tantric schools of Buddhism. Gopala was the first ruler from the dynasty. He came to power in 750 CE in Gaur by a democratic election. This event is recognized as one of the first democratic elections in South Asia since the time of the Mahā Janapadas. He reigned from 750 to 770 CE and consolidated his position by extending his control over all of Bengal. The Buddhist dynasty lasted for four centuries (750–1120 CE) and ushered in a period of stability and prosperity in Bengal. They created many temples and works of art as well as supported the Universities of Nalanda and Vikramashila. Somapura Mahavihara built by Dharmapala is the greatest Buddhist Vihara in the Indian subcontinent.

The empire reached its peak under Dharmapala and Devapala. Dharmapala extended the empire into the northern parts of the Indian subcontinent. This triggered once again the power struggle for the control of the subcontinent. Devapala, successor of Dharmapala, expanded the empire to cover much of South Asia and beyond. His empire stretched from Assam and Utkala in the east, Kamboja (modern-day Afghanistan) in the north-west and Deccan in the south. According to Pala copperplate inscription Devapala exterminated the Utkalas, conquered the Pragjyotisha (Assam), shattered the pride of the Huna, and humbled the lords of Gurjaras (the Gurjara-Pratiharas) and the Dravidas.

The death of Devapala ended the period of ascendancy of the Pala Empire and several independent dynasties and kingdoms emerged during this time. However, Mahipala I rejuvenated the reign of the Palas. He recovered control over all of Bengal and expanded the empire. He survived the invasions of Rajendra Chola and the Chalukyas. After Mahipala I the Pala dynasty again saw its decline until Ramapala, the last great ruler of the dynasty, managed to retrieve the position of the dynasty to some extent. He crushed the Varendra rebellion and extended his empire farther to Kamarupa, Odisha and Northern India.

The Pala Empire can be considered as the golden era of Bengal. Palas were responsible for the introduction of Mahayana Buddhism in Tibet, Bhutan and Myanmar. The Palas had extensive trade and influence in south-east Asia. This can be seen in the sculptures and architectural style of the Sailendra Empire (present-day Malaya, Java, Sumatra).

=== Karnatas of Mithila ===
In 1097 AD, the Karnat dynasty of Mithila emerged on the Bihar/Nepal border area and maintained capitals in Darbhanga and Simraongadh. The dynasty was established by Nanyadeva, a military commander of Karnataka-origin. Under this dynasty, the Maithili language started to develop with the first piece of Maithili literature, the Varna Ratnakara being produced in the 14th century by Jyotirishwar Thakur. The Karnats also carried out raids into Nepal. They fell in 1324 following the invasion of Ghiyasuddin Tughlaq.

=== The Candras ===
The Candra Dynasty who ruled over eastern Bengal and were contemporaries of the Palas.

=== The Eastern Gangas ===
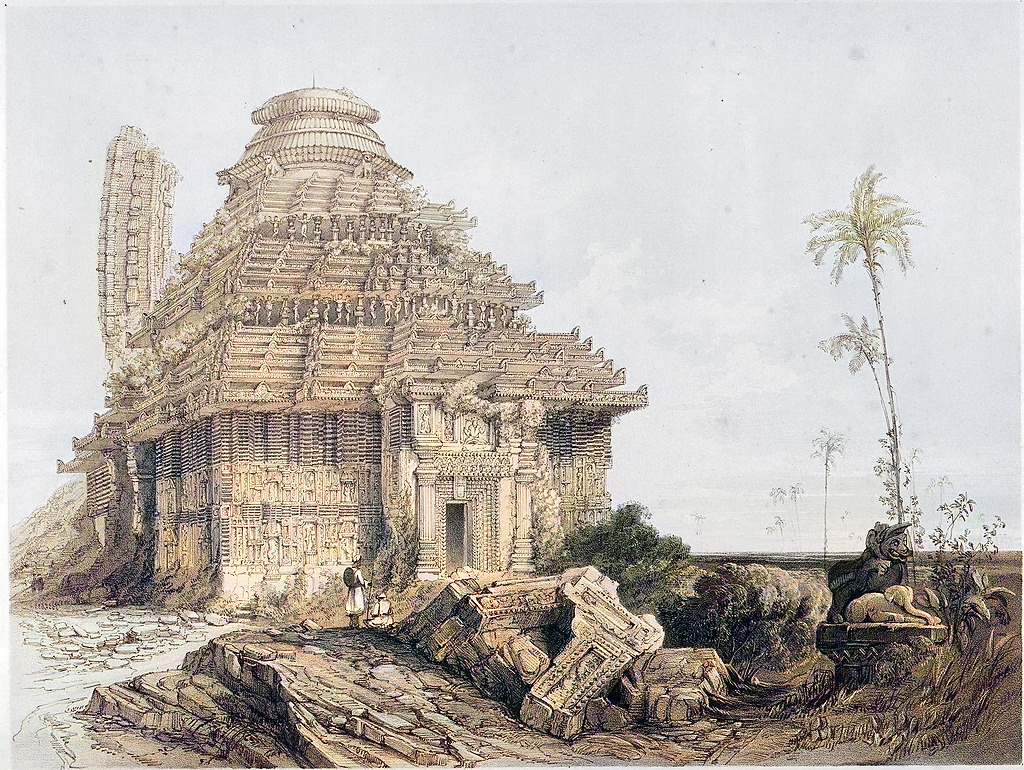
Konark Sun Temple at Konark, Odisha, built by King Narasimhadeva I (1236–1264 AD) also a World Heritage Site.

The Eastern Ganga dynasty rulers reigned over Kaḷinga which consisted of the parts of the modern-day Indian states of Odisha, West Bengal, Jharkhand, Chhattisgarh, Madhya Pradesh and Andhra Pradesh from the 11th century to the early 15th century. Their capital was known by the name Kalinganagar, which is the modern Srimukhalingam in Srikakulam District of Andhra Pradesh bordering Odisha. Today they are most remembered as the builders of the Konark Sun Temple a World Heritage Site at Konark, Odisha. It was built by King Narasimhadeva I (1238–1264 CE). During their reign (1078–1434 CE) a new style of temple architecture came into being, commonly called as Indo-Aryan architecture. This dynasty was founded by King Anantavarma Chodaganga Deva (1078–1147 CE). He was a religious person and a patron of art and literature. He is credited for having built the famous Jagannath Temple of Puri in Odisha.

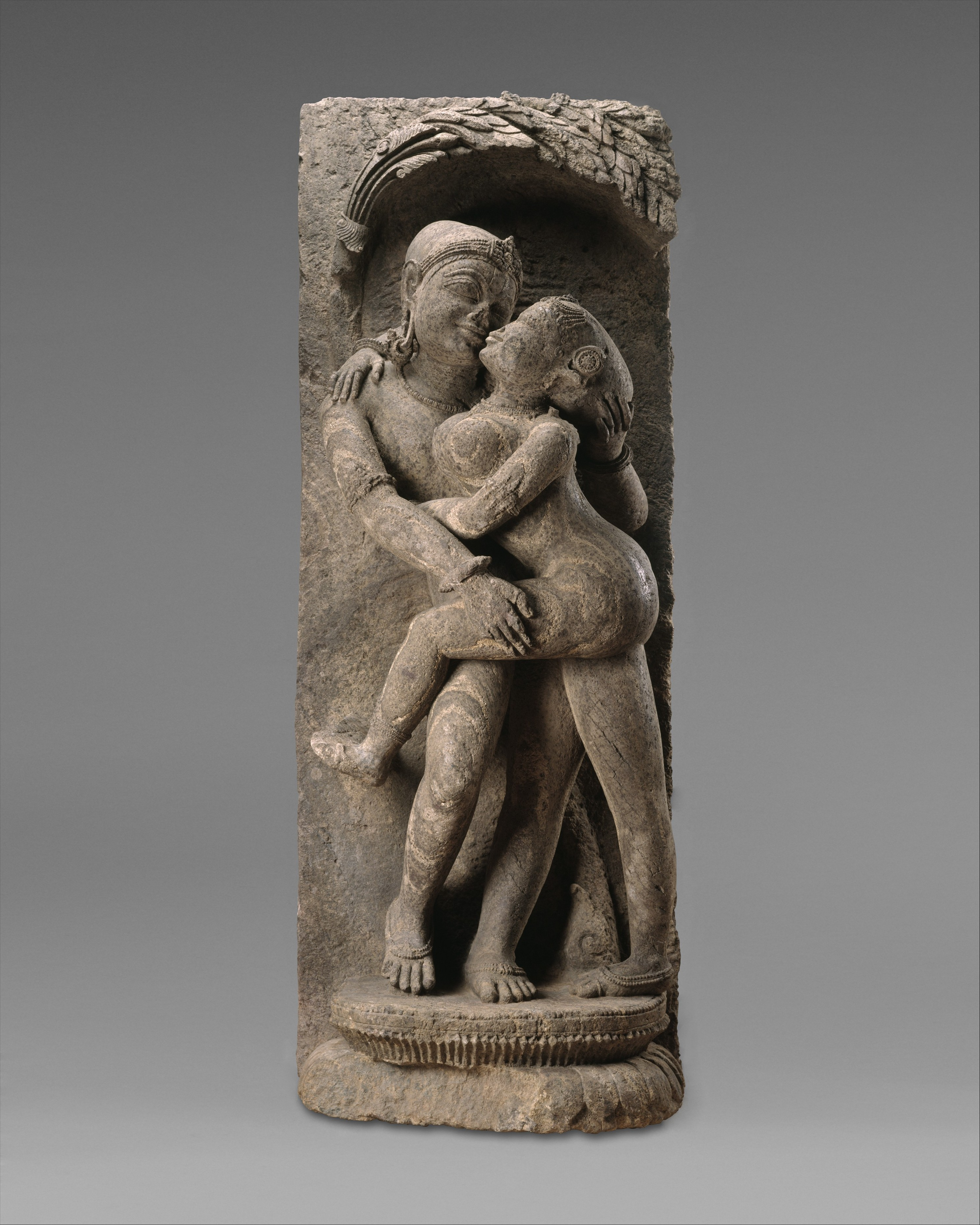
Loving Couple (Mithuna) 13th century, Eastern Ganga Dynasty, Orissa, India

King Anantavarman Chodagangadeva was succeeded by a long line of illustrious rulers such as Narasimhadeva I (1238–1264 CE). The rulers of Eastern Ganga dynasty not only defended their kingdom from the constant attacks of the Muslim rulers from both northern and southern India but were perhaps one of the few empires to have successfully invaded and defeated their Muslim adversaries. The Eastern Ganga King Narasimha Deva I invaded the Muslim kingdom of Bengal and handed a heavy defeat to the Sultan. This ensured that Sultanate never encroached upon the domains of the Ganga Emperors for nearly a century. His military exploits still survive today as folklore in Odisha. This kingdom prospered through trade and commerce and the wealth was mostly used in the construction of temples. The rule of the dynasty came to end under the reign of King Bhanudeva IV (1414–1434 CE), in the early 15th century.

=== The Senas ===
The Palas were followed by the Sena dynasty who brought Bengal under one ruler during the 12th century. Vijay Sen the second ruler of this dynasty defeated the last Pala emperor Madanapala and established his reign. Ballal Sena introduced Kulīna System in Bengal and made Nabadwip the capital. The fourth king of this dynasty Lakshman Sen expanded the empire beyond Bengal to Bihar, Assam, northern Odisha and probably to Varanasi. Lakshman was later defeated by the Muslims and fled to eastern Bengal where he ruled few more years. The Sena dynasty brought a revival of Hinduism and cultivated Sanskrit literature in India.

=== The Varmans ===
The Varman Dynasty (not to be confused with the Varman dynasty of Kamarupa) ruled over eastern Bengal and were contemporaries of the Senas.

== The Northeast ==
=== Kamarupa ===
The Kāmarūpa, also called Pragjyotisha, was one of the historical kingdoms of Assam alongside Davaka, Davaka (Nowgong) and Kamarupa as separate and submissive friendly kingdoms. that existed from 350 to 1140 CE. Ruled by three dynasties from their capitals in present-day Guwahati, North Guwahati and Tezpur, it at its height covered the entire Brahmaputra Valley, North Bengal, Bhutan and parts of Bangladesh, and at times portions of West Bengal and Bihar.

==== The Varmans ====
The Varman dynasty (350–650 CE), the first historical rulers of Kamarupa; was established by Pushyavarman, a contemporary of Samudragupta. While Pushyavarman was the contemporary of the Gupta Emperor Samudra Gupta, Bhaskaravarman was the contemporary of Harshavardhana of Kanauj. This dynasty became vassals of the Gupta Empire, but as the power of the Guptas waned, Mahendravarman (470–494 CE) performed two Ashvamedha (horse sacrifices) and threw off the imperial yoke. (Note: "According to him (D C Sircar) Narayanavarma, the father of Bhutivarman, was the first Kamarupa king to perform horse-sacrifices and thus for the first time since the days of Pusyavarman freedom from the Gupta political supremacy was declared by Narayanavarma. But a careful study or even a casual perusal of the seal attached to the Dubi C.P. and of the nalanda seals should show that it is Sri Mahendra, the father of Narayanavarma himself, who is described as the performer of two horse-sacrifices."(Sharma 1978, p. 8)) The first of the three Kamarupa dynasties, the Varmans were followed by the Mlechchha and then the Pala dynasties.

==== The Mlechchhas ====
The Mlechchha dynasty succeeded the Varman dynasty and ruled to the end of the 10th century. They ruled from their capital in the vicinity of the Harrupeshwara (Tezpur). The rulers were aboriginals, with lineage from Narakasura. According to historical records, there were ten rulers in this dynasty. The Mlechchha dynasty in Kamarupa was followed by the Pala kings.

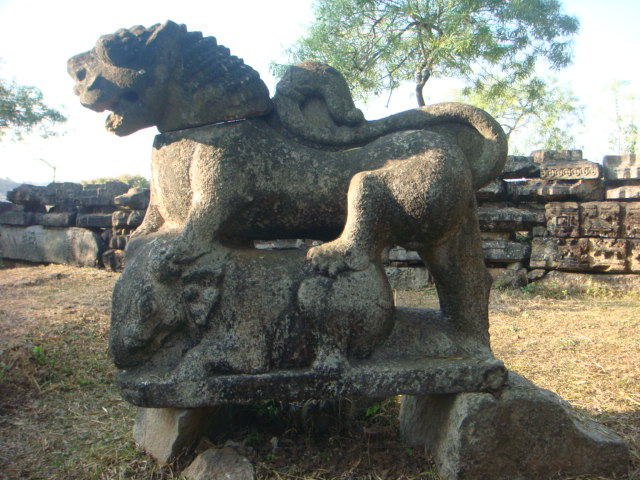
9th–10th century lion sculpture representing powerful Kamarupa-Palas, Madan Kamdev

==== The Palas ====
The Pala dynasty of Kamarupa succeeded the Mlechchha dynasty, ruled from its capital at Durjaya (North Gauhati). Dynasty reigned till the end of the 12th century.

Brahma Pala (900–920 CE), was founder Pala dynasty (900–1100 CE) of Kamarupa. Dynasty ruled from its capital Durjaya, modern-day North Guwahati. The greatest of the Pala kings, Dharma Pala had his capital at Kamarupa Nagara, now identified with North Guwahati. Ratna Pala was another notable sovereign of this line. Records of his land-grants have been found at Bargaon and Sualkuchi, while a similar relic of Indra Pala, has been discovered at Guwahati. Pala dynasty come to end with Jaya Pala (1075–1100 CE).

=== Twipra ===
The Twipra Kingdom ruled ancient Tripura. Kingdom was established around the confluence of the Brahmaputra river with the Meghna and Surma rivers in today's Central Bangladesh area. The capital was called Khorongma and was along the Meghna river in the Sylhet Division of present-day Bangladesh.

== Deccan plateau and the South ==
In the first half of the millennium the South saw various small kingdoms rise and fall mostly independent to the turmoil in the Gangetic plains and the spread of the Buddhism and Jainism to the southern tip of India. From the mid-seventh to the mid-13th centuries, regionalism was the dominant theme of political and dynastic history of the Indian subcontinent. Three features commonly characterize the sociopolitical realities of this period.

- First, the spread of Brahmanical religions was a two-way process of Sanskritization of local cults and localization of Brahmanical social order.
- Second was the ascendancy of the Brahman priestly and landowning groups that later dominated regional institutions and political developments.
- Third, because of the seesawing of numerous dynasties that had a remarkable ability to survive perennial military attacks, regional kingdoms faced frequent defeats but seldom total annihilation.

Peninsular India was involved in an 8th-century tripartite power struggle among the Chalukyas (556–757 CE), the Pallavas (300–888 CE) of Kanchipuram, and the Pandyas. The Chalukya rulers were overthrown by their subordinates, the Rashtrakutas (753–973 CE). Although both the Pallava and Pandya kingdoms were enemies, the real struggle for political domination was between the Pallava and Chalukya realms.

The emergence of the Rashtrakutas heralded a new era in the history of South India. South Indian kingdoms had hitherto ruled areas only up to and south of the Narmada River. It was the Rashtrakutas who first forged north to the Gangetic plains and successfully contested their might against the Palas of Bengal and the Rajput Prathiharas of Gujarat.

Despite interregional conflicts, local autonomy was preserved to a far greater degree in the south where it had prevailed for centuries. The absence of a highly centralized government was associated with a corresponding local autonomy in the administration of villages and districts. Extensive and well-documented overland and maritime trade flourished with the Arabs on the west coast and with Southeast Asia. Trade facilitated cultural diffusion in Southeast Asia, where local elites selectively but willingly adopted Indian art, architecture, literature, and social customs.

The interdynastic rivalry and seasonal raids into each other's territory notwithstanding, the rulers in the Deccan and South India patronized all three religions - Buddhism, Hinduism, and Jainism. The religions vied with each other for royal favor, expressed in land grants but more importantly in the creation of monumental temples, which remain architectural wonders. The cave temples of Elephanta Island (near Mumbai or Bombay, as it was known formerly), Ajanta, and Ellora (in Maharashtra), and structural temples of Pattadakal, Aihole, Badami in Karnataka and Mahaballipuram and Kanchipuram in Tamil Nadu are enduring legacies of otherwise warring regional rulers.

By the mid-7th century, Buddhism and Jainism began to decline as sectarian Hindu devotional cults of Shiva and Vishnu vigorously competed for popular support.

Although Sanskrit was the language of learning and theology in South India, as it was in the north, the growth of the bhakti (devotional) movements enhanced the crystallization of vernacular literature in Dravidian languages: Kannada and Tamil; they often borrowed themes and vocabulary from Sanskrit but preserved much local cultural lore. Examples of Tamil literature include two major poems, Cilappatikaram (The Jewelled Anklet) and Manimekalai (The Jewelled Belt); the body of devotional literature of Jain and Buddhist and also Hindu devotional movements; and the reworking of the Ramayana by Kamban in the 12th century. A nationwide cultural synthesis had taken place with a minimum of common characteristics in the various regions of South Asia, but the process of cultural infusion and assimilation would continue to shape and influence India's history through the centuries.

=== The Sangam Era Kingdoms ===
Farther south were three ancient Tamil states — Chera (on the west), Chola (on the east), and Pandya (in the south). They were involved in internecine warfare seeking regional supremacy. They are mentioned in Greek and Ashokan sources as important Indian kingdoms beyond the Mauryan Empire. A corpus of ancient Tamil literature, known as Sangam (academy) works, provides much useful information about life in these kingdoms in the era 300 BCE to 200 CE.

Tamil social order was based on different ecoregions. Segments of society were characterized by matriarchy and matrilineal succession—which survived well into the 19th century—cross-cousin marriage, and strong regional identity. Tribal chieftains emerged as "kings" just as people moved from pastoralism toward agriculture sustained by irrigation based on rivers by small-scale water tanks (as man-made ponds are called in India) and wells, as well as maritime trade with Rome and Southeast Asia.

Discoveries of Roman gold coins in various sites attest to extensive South Indian links with the outside world. As with Pataliputra in the northeast and Taxila in the northwest (in modern Pakistan), the city of Madurai, the capital of the Pandyan Kingdom (in modern Tamil Nadu), was the center of intellectual and literary activity. Poets and bards assembled there under royal patronage at successive concourses to composed anthologies of poems and expositions on Tamil grammar. By the end of the 1st century BCE, South Asia was crisscrossed by overland trade routes, which facilitated the movements of Buddhist and Jain missionaries and other travelers and opened the area to a synthesis of many cultures.

=== The Cheras ===
From early pre-historic times, Kerala and Tamil Nadu were the homes of the four Tamil-Malayalam states of the Chera, Chola, Pandya and Pallavas. The oldest extant literature, dated between 300 BCE and 600 CE mentions the exploits of the kings and the princes, and of the poets who extolled them. Cherans, who spoke Tamil language ruled from the capitals of Kuttanad, Muziris, Karur, and traded extensively with West Asian kingdoms.

An unknown dynasty called Kalabhras invaded and displaced the three Tamil kingdoms between the 4th and the 7th centuries. This is referred to as the Dark Age in Tamil history. They were eventually expelled by the Pallavas and the Pandyas.

=== The Kalabhras ===
Little of their origins or the time during which they ruled is known beyond that they ruled over the entirety of the southern tip of India during the 3rd to the 6th century, overcoming the Sangam era kingdoms. The appear to be patrons of Jainism and Buddhism as the only source of information on them is the scattered mentions in the many Buddhist and Jain literature of the time. They were contemporaries of the Kadambas and the Western Ganga Dynasty. They were overcome by the rise of the Pallavas and the resurgence of the Pandyan Kingdom.

=== The Kadambas ===
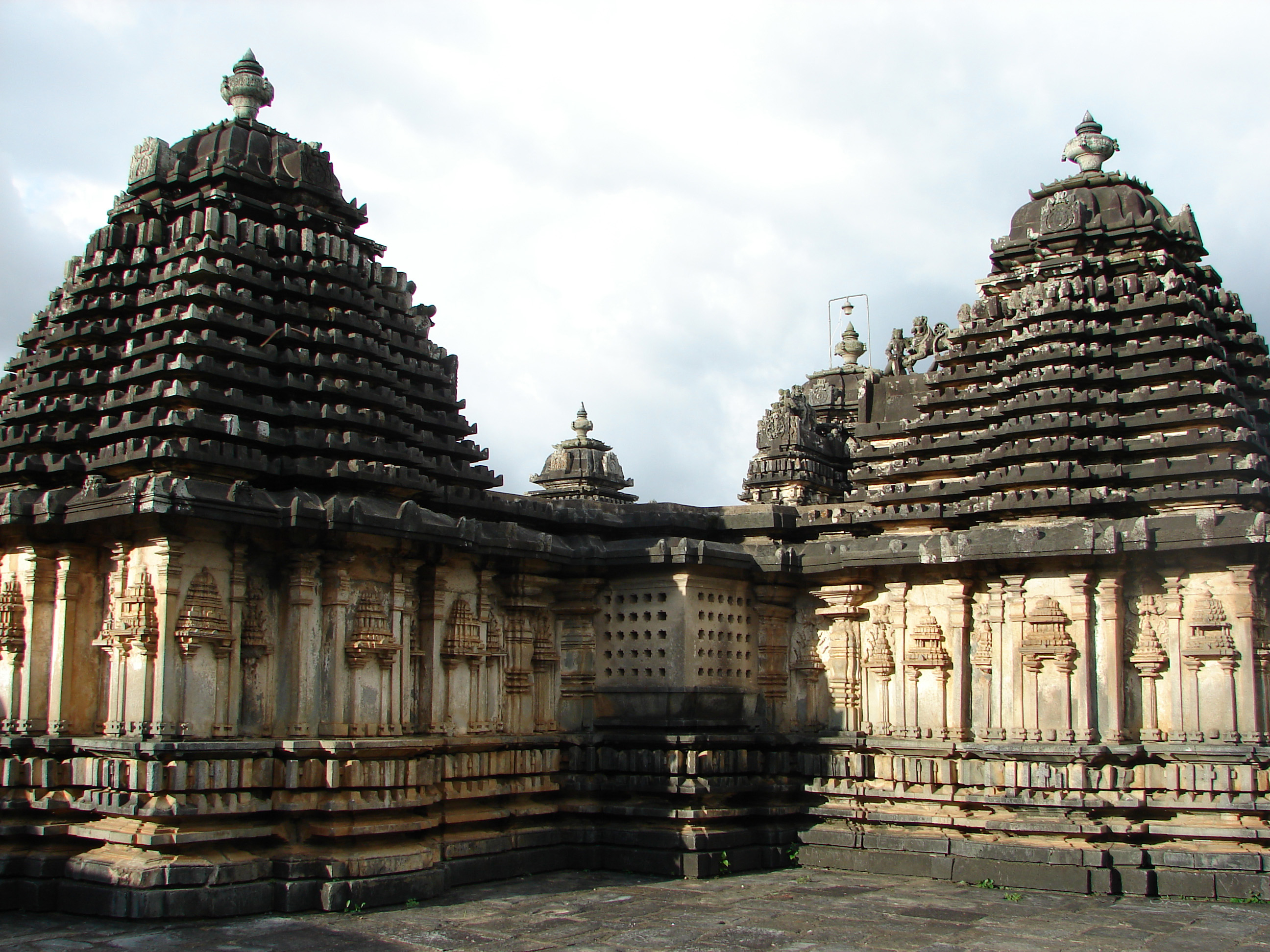
Kadamba tower at Doddagaddavalli

The Kadamba Dynasty (Kannada: ಕದಂಬರು) (345–525 CE) was an ancient royal family of Karnataka that ruled from Banavasi in present-day Uttara Kannada district. The dynasty later continued to rule as a feudatory of larger Kannada empires, the Chalukya and the Rashtrakuta empires for over five hundred years during which time they branched into Goa and Hanagal. At the peak of their power under King Kakushtavarma, they ruled large parts of Karnataka. During the pre-Kadamba era the ruling families that controlled Karnataka, the Mauryas, Satavahanas and Chutus were not natives of the region and the nucleus of power resided outside present day Karnataka. The Kadambas were the first indigenous dynasty to use Kannada, the language of the soil at an administrative level. In the history of Karnataka, this era serves as a broad based historical starting point in the study of the development of region as an enduring geo-political entity and Kannada as an important regional language.

The dynasty was founded by Mayurasharma in 345 which at times showed the potential of developing into imperial proportions, an indication to which is provided by the titles and epithets assumed by its rulers. One of his successors, Kakusthavarma was a powerful ruler and even the kings of imperial Gupta Dynasty of northern India cultivated marital relationships with his family, giving a fair indication of the sovereign nature of their kingdom. Tiring of the endless battles and bloodshed, one of the later descendants, King Shivakoti adopted Jainism. The Kadambas were contemporaries of the Western Ganga Dynasty of Talakad and together they formed the earliest native kingdoms to rule the land with absolute autonomy.

=== The Western Gangas ===
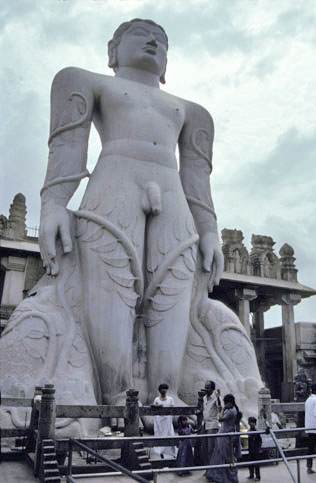
Statue of Bahubali as Gommateshvara built by the Western Ganga is one of the largest monolithic statues in the world.

The Western Ganga Dynasty (350–1000 CE) (Kannada: ಪಶ್ಚಿಮ ಗಂಗ ಸಂಸ್ಥಾನ) was an important ruling dynasty of ancient Karnataka in India. They are known as Western Gangas to distinguish them from the Eastern Gangas, who in later centuries ruled over modern Odisha. The general belief is the Western Gangas began their rule during a time when multiple native clans asserted their freedom due to the weakening of the Pallava dynasty of South India, a geo-political event sometimes attributed to the southern conquests of Samudragupta. The Western Ganga sovereignty lasted from about 350 to 550 CE, initially ruling from Kolar and later moving their capital to Talakad on the banks of the Kaveri in modern Mysore district.

After the rise of the imperial Chalukya dynasty of Badami, the Gangas accepted Chalukya overlordship and fought for the cause of their overlords against the Pallavas of Kanchipuram. The Chalukyas were replaced by the Rashtrakutas of Manyakheta in 753 CE as the dominant power in the Deccan. After a century of struggle for autonomy, the Western Gangas finally accepted Rashtrakuta overlordship and successfully fought alongside them against their foes, the Chola dynasty of Tanjavur. In the late 10th century, north of Tungabhadra river, the Rashtrakutas were replaced by the emerging Western Chalukya Empire and the Chola Dynasty saw renewed power south of the Kaveri. The defeat of the Western Gangas by Cholas around 1000 resulted in the end of Ganga influence over the region.

Though territorially a small kingdom, the Western Ganga contribution to polity, culture and literature of the modern south Karnataka region is considered important. The Western Ganga kings showed benevolent tolerance to all faiths but are most famous for their patronage towards Jainism resulting in the construction of monuments in places such as Shravanabelagola and Kambadahalli. The kings of this dynasty encouraged the fine arts due to which literature in Kannada and Sanskrit flourished. Chavundaraya's writing, Chavundaraya Purana of 978 CE, is an important work in Kannada prose. Many classics were written on subjects ranging from religious topics to elephant management.

=== The Badami Chalukyas ===
The Chalukya Empire, natives of the Aihole and Badami region in Karnataka, were at first a feudatory of the Kadambas. Jayasimha and Ranaraga, ancestors of Pulakeshin I, were administrative officers in the Badami province under the Kadambas (Fleet in Kanarese Dynasties, p. 343), They encouraged the use of Kannada in addition to the Sanskrit language in their administration. (Note: A considerable number of their records are in Kannada.) (Note: 7th century Chalukya inscriptions call Kannada the natural language.) In the middle of the 6th century the Chalukyas came into their own when Pulakeshin I made the hill fortress in Badami his center of power. During the rule of Pulakeshin II a south Indian empire sent expeditions to the north past the Tapti River and Narmada River for the first time and successfully defied Harshavardhana, the King of Northern India (Uttarapatheswara). The Aihole inscription of Pulakeshin II, written in classical Sanskrit language and old Kannada script dated 634, (Note: In this composition, the poet deems himself an equal to Sanskrit scholars of lore like Bharavi and Kalidasa.) proclaims his victories against the Kingdoms of Kadambas, Western Gangas, Alupas of South Canara, Mauryas of Puri, Kingdom of Kosala, Malwa, Lata and Gurjaras of southern Rajasthan. The inscription describes how King Harsha of Kannauj lost his Harsha (joyful disposition) on seeing a large number of his war elephants die in battle against Pulakeshin II. (Note: Some of these kingdoms may have submitted out of fear of Harshavardhana of Kannauj. The rulers of Kosala were the Panduvamshis of South Kosala.)

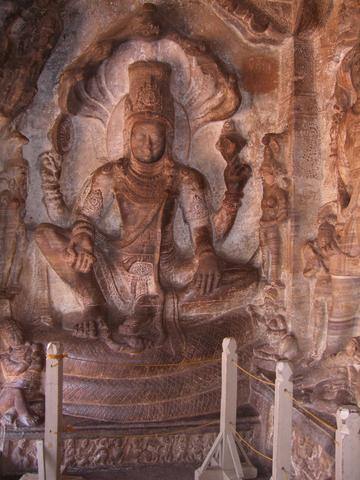
Badami Cave Temples No 3. (Vishnu)

These victories earned him the title Dakshinapatha Prithviswamy (lord of the south). Pulakeshin II continued his conquests in the east where he conquered all kingdoms in his way and reached the Bay of Bengal in present-day Odisha. A Chalukya viceroyalty was set up in Gujarat and Vengi (coastal Andhra) and princes from the Badami family were dispatched to rule them. Having subdued the Pallavas of Kanchipuram, he accepted tributes from the Pandyas of Madurai, Chola dynasty and Cheras of the Kerala region. Pulakeshin II thus became the master of India, south of the Narmada River. Pulakeshin II is widely regarded as one of the great kings in Indian history. Hiuen-Tsiang, a Chinese traveller visited the court of Pulakeshin II at this time and Persian emperor Khosrau II exchanged ambassadors. (Note: From the notes of Arab traveller Tabari.) However, the continuous wars with Pallavas took a turn for the worse in 642 when the Pallava king Narasimhavarman I avenged his father's defeat, conquered and plundered the capital of Pulakeshin II who may have died in battle. A century later, Chalukya Vikramaditya II marched victoriously into Kanchipuram, the Pallava capital and occupied it on three occasions, the third time under the leadership of his son and crown prince Kirtivarman II. He thus avenged the earlier humiliation of the Chalukyas by the Pallavas and engraved a Kannada inscription on the victory pillar at the Kailasanatha Temple. He later overran the other traditional kingdoms of Tamil country, the Pandyas, Cholas and Keralas in addition to subduing a Kalabhra ruler.

The Kappe Arabhatta record from this period (700) in tripadi (three line) metre is considered the earliest available record in Kannada poetics. The most enduring legacy of the Chalukya dynasty is the architecture and art that they left behind. More than one hundred and fifty monuments attributed to them, built between 450 and 700, have survived in the Malaprabha basin in Karnataka, over 125 temples exist in Aihole alone. The constructions are centred in a relatively small area within the Chalukyan heartland. The structural temples at Pattadakal, a UNESCO World Heritage Site, the cave temples of Badami, the temples at Mahakuta and early experiments in temple building at Aihole are their most celebrated monuments. Two of the famous paintings at Ajanta cave no. 1, "The Temptation of the Buddha" and "The Persian Embassy" are also credited to them. (Note: Kamath quotes K. V. Soundararajan, speaking of the Chalukyan art: "The Badami Chalukya introduced in the western Deccan a glorious chapter alike in heroism in battle and cultural magnificence in peace, in Western Deccan".) Further, they influenced the architecture in far off places like Gujarat and Vengi as evidenced in the Nava Brahma temples at Alampur.

=== The Pallavas ===
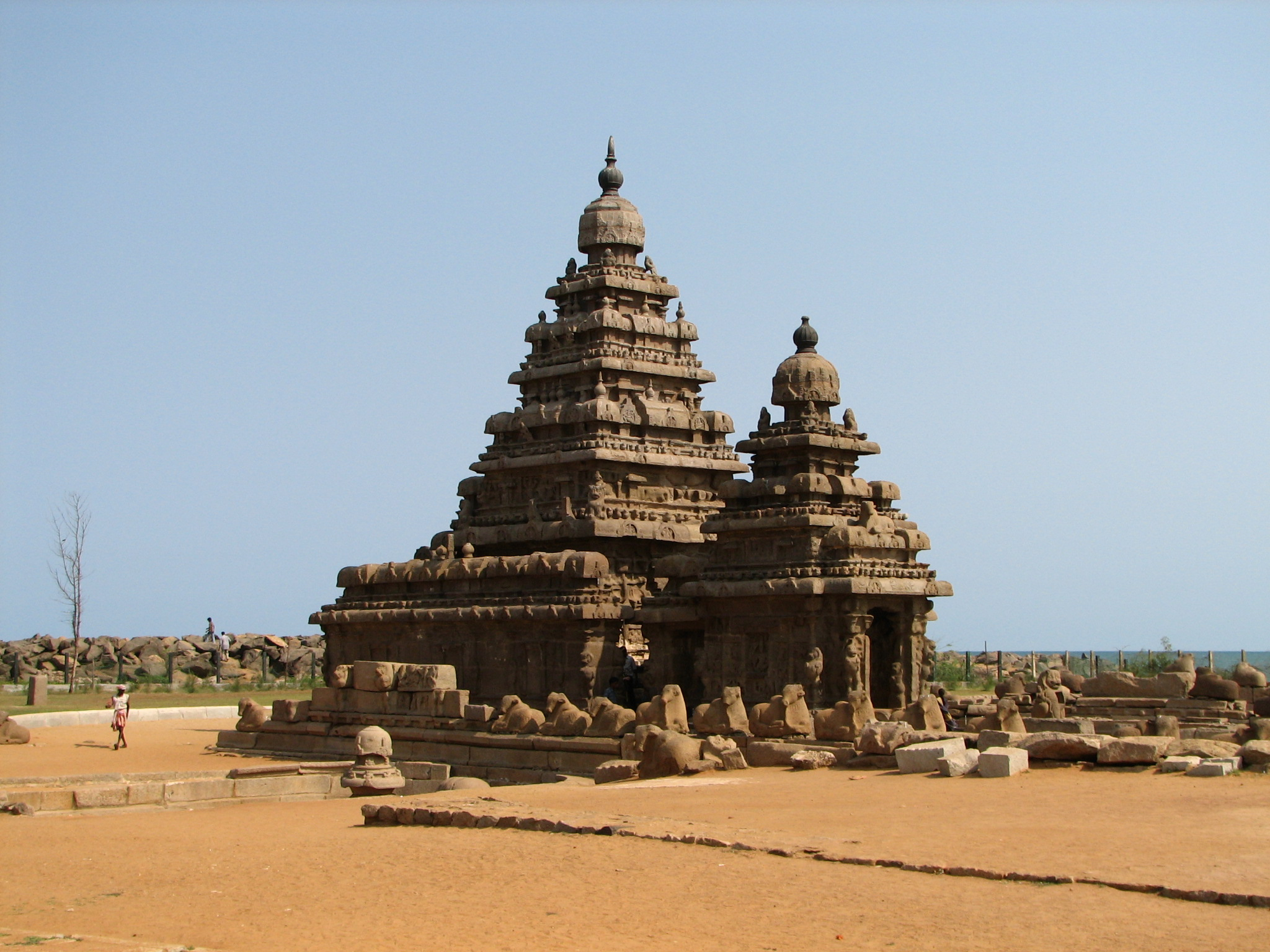
Shore Temple in Mamallapuram built by the Pallavas. (c. eighth century CE)

The 7th century Tamil Nadu saw the rise of the Pallavas under Mahendravarman I and his son Mamalla Narasimhavarman I. The Pallavas were not a recognised political power before the 2nd century. It has been widely accepted by scholars that they were originally executive officers under the Satavahana Empire. After the fall of the Satavahanas, they began to get control over parts of Andhra and the Tamil country. Later they had marital ties with the Vishnukundina who ruled over the Deccan. It was around 550 AD under King Simhavishnu that the Pallavas emerged into prominence. They subjugated the Cholas and reigned as far south as the Kaveri River. Pallavas ruled a large portion of South India with Kanchipuram as their capital. Dravidian architecture reached its peak during the Pallava rule. Narasimhavarman II built the Shore Temple which is a UNESCO World Heritage Site. Many sources describe Bodhidharma, the founder of the Zen school of Buddhism in China, as a prince of the Pallava dynasty.

=== The Eastern Chalukyas ===
Eastern Chalukyas were a South Indian dynasty whose kingdom was located in the present day Andhra Pradesh. Their capital was Vengi and their dynasty lasted for around 500 years from the 7th century until c. 1130 CE when the Vengi kingdom merged with the Chola empire. The Vengi kingdom was continued to be ruled by Eastern Chalukyan kings under the protection of the Chola empire until 1189 CE, when the kingdom succumbed to the Hoysalas and the Yadavas. They had their capital originally at Vengi now (Pedavegi, Chinavegi and Denduluru) near Eluru of the West Godavari district end later changed to Rajamahendravaram (Rajamundry).

Eastern Chalukyas were closely related to the Chalukyas of Vatapi (Badami). Throughout their history they were the cause of many wars between the more powerful Cholas and Western Chalukyas over the control of the strategic Vengi country. The five centuries of the Eastern Chalukya rule of Vengi saw not only the consolidation of this region into a unified whole, but also saw the efflorescence of Telugu culture, literature, poetry and art during the later half of their rule. It can be said to be the golden period of Andhra history.

=== The Pandyas ===
Pallavas were replaced by the Pandyas in the 8th century. Their capital Madurai was in the deep south away from the coast. They had extensive trade links with the Southeast Asian maritime empires of Srivijaya and their successors. As well as contacts, even diplomatic, reaching as far as the Roman Empire. During the 13th century of the Christian era Marco Polo mentioned it as the richest empire in existence. Temples like Meenakshi Amman Temple at Madurai and Nellaiappar Temple at Tirunelveli are the best examples of Pandyan Temple architecture. The Pandyas excelled in both trade as well as literature and they controlled the pearl fisheries along the South Indian coast, between Sri Lanka and India, which produced some of the finest pearls in the known ancient world.

=== The Rashtrakutas ===
Rashtrakuta Empire in 800 CE, 915 CE.

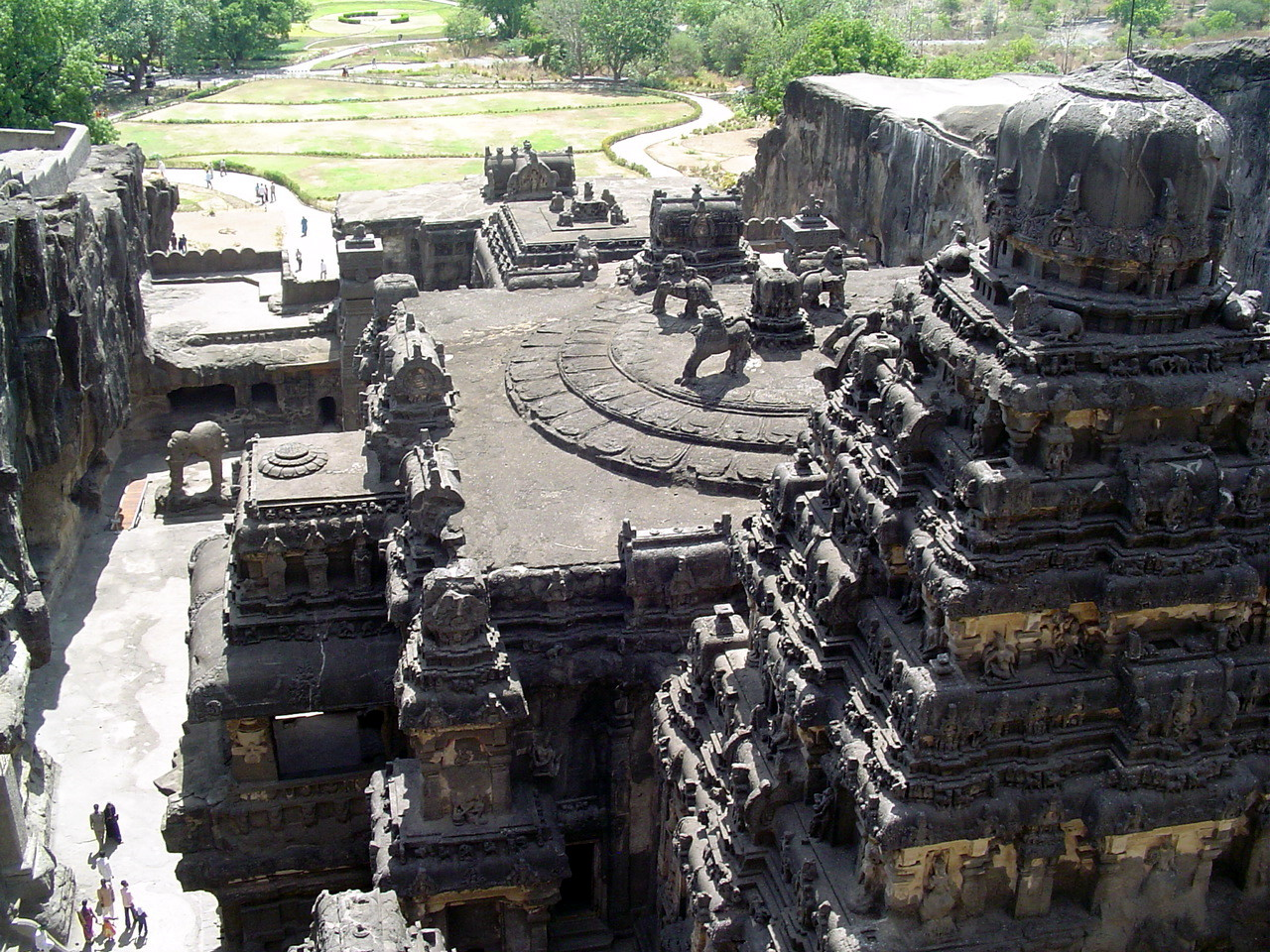
Kailash Temple in Ellora Caves

In the middle of the 8th century the Chalukya rule was ended by their feudatory, the Rashtrakuta family rulers of Berar (in present-day Amravati district of Maharashtra). Sensing an opportunity during a weak period in the Chalukya rule, Dantidurga trounced the great Chalukyan "Karnatabala" (power of Karnata). (Note: From the Rashtrakuta inscriptions.: The Samangadh copper plate grant (753) confirms that feudatory Dantidurga defeated the Chalukyas and humbled their great Karnatik army (referring to the army of the Badami Chalukyas)) Having overthrown the Chalukyas, the Rashtrakutas made Manyakheta their capital (modern Malkhed in Kalaburagi district). (Note: From Karda plates: "A capital which could put to shame even the capital of gods": "A capital city built to excel that of Indra") Although the origins of the early Rashtrakuta ruling families in central India and the Deccan in the 6th and 7th centuries is controversial, during the eighth through the 10th centuries they emphasised the importance of the Kannada language in conjunction with Sanskrit in their administration. Rashtrakuta inscriptions are in Kannada and Sanskrit only. They encouraged literature in both languages and thus literature flowered under their rule. (Note: Even royalty of the empire took part in poetic and literary activities. Literature in Kannada and Sanskrit flowered during the Rashtrakuta rule.)

The Rashtrakutas quickly became the most powerful Deccan empire, making their initial successful forays into the doab region of Ganges River and Jamuna River during the rule of Dhruva Dharavarsha. His victories were a "digvijaya" gaining only fame and booty in that region. The rule of his son Govinda III signaled a new era with Rashtrakuta victories against the Pala Dynasty of Bengal and Gurjara Pratihara of north western India resulting in the capture of Kannauj. The Rashtrakutas held Kannauj intermittently during a period of a tripartite struggle for the resources of the rich Gangetic plains. Because of Govinda III's victories, historians have compared him to Alexander the Great and Pandava Arjuna of the Hindu epic Mahabharata. The Sanjan inscription states the horses of Govinda III drank the icy water of the Himalayan stream and his war elephants tasted the sacred waters of the Ganges River. Amoghavarsha I, eulogised by contemporary Arab traveller Sulaiman as one among the four great emperors of the world, succeeded Govinda III to the throne and ruled during an important cultural period that produced landmark writings in Kannada and Sanskrit. (Note: Kavirajamarga in Kannada and Prashnottara Ratnamalika in Sanskrit) The benevolent development of Jain religion was a hallmark of his rule. Because of his religious temperament, his interest in the arts and literature and his peace-loving nature, he has been compared to emperor Ashoka. The rule of Indra III in the 10th century enhanced the Rashtrakuta position as an imperial power as they conquered and held Kannauj again. Krishna III followed Indra III to the throne in 939. A patron of Kannada literature and a powerful warrior, his reign marked the submission of the Paramara of Ujjain in the north and Cholas in the south.

An Arabic writing Silsilatuttavarikh (851) called the Rashtrakutas one among the four principle empires of the world. Kitab-ul-Masalik-ul-Mumalik (912) called them the "greatest kings of India" and there were many other contemporaneous books written in their praise. The Rashtrakuta empire at its peak spread from Cape Comorin in the south to Kannauj in the north and from Banaras in the east to Broach (Bharuch) in the west. While the Rashtrakutas built many fine monuments in the Deccan, the most extensive and sumptuous of their work is the monolithic Kailasanatha temple at Ellora, the temple being a splendid achievement. In Karnataka their most famous temples are the Kashivishvanatha temple and the Jain Narayana temple at Pattadakal. All of the monuments are designated UNESCO World Heritage Sites.

=== The Western Chalukyas ===
In the late 10th century, the Western Chalukyas, also known as the Kalyani Chalukyas or 'Later' Chalukyas rose to power by overthrowing the Rashtrakutas under whom they had been serving as feudatories. Manyakheta was their capital early on before they moved it to Kalyani (modern Basavakalyan). Whether the kings of this empire belonged to the same family line as their namesakes, the Badami Chalukyas is still debated. Whatever the Western Chalukya origins, Kannada remained their language of administration and the Kannada and Sanskrit literature of their time was prolific. More inscriptions in Kannada are attributed to the Chalukya King Vikramaditya VI than to any other king prior to the 12th century, Tailapa II, a feudatory ruler from Tardavadi (modern Bijapur district), re-established the Chalukya rule by defeating the Rashtrakutas during the reign of Karka II. He timed his rebellion to coincide with the confusion caused by the invading Paramara of Central India to the Rashtrakutas capital in 973. Tailapa II was helped in this campaign by the Kadambas of Hanagal. This era produced prolonged warfare with the Chola dynasty of Tamilakam for control of the resources of the Godavari River–Krishna River doab region in Vengi. Someshvara I, a brave Chalukyan king, successfully curtailed the growth of the Chola Empire to the south of the Tungabhadra River region despite suffering some defeats while maintaining control over his feudatories in the Konkan, Gujarat, Malwa and Kaḷinga regions. For approximately 100 years, beginning in the early 11th century, the Cholas occupied large areas of South Karnataka region (Gangavadi). The Cholas occupied Gangavadi from 1004 to 1114.

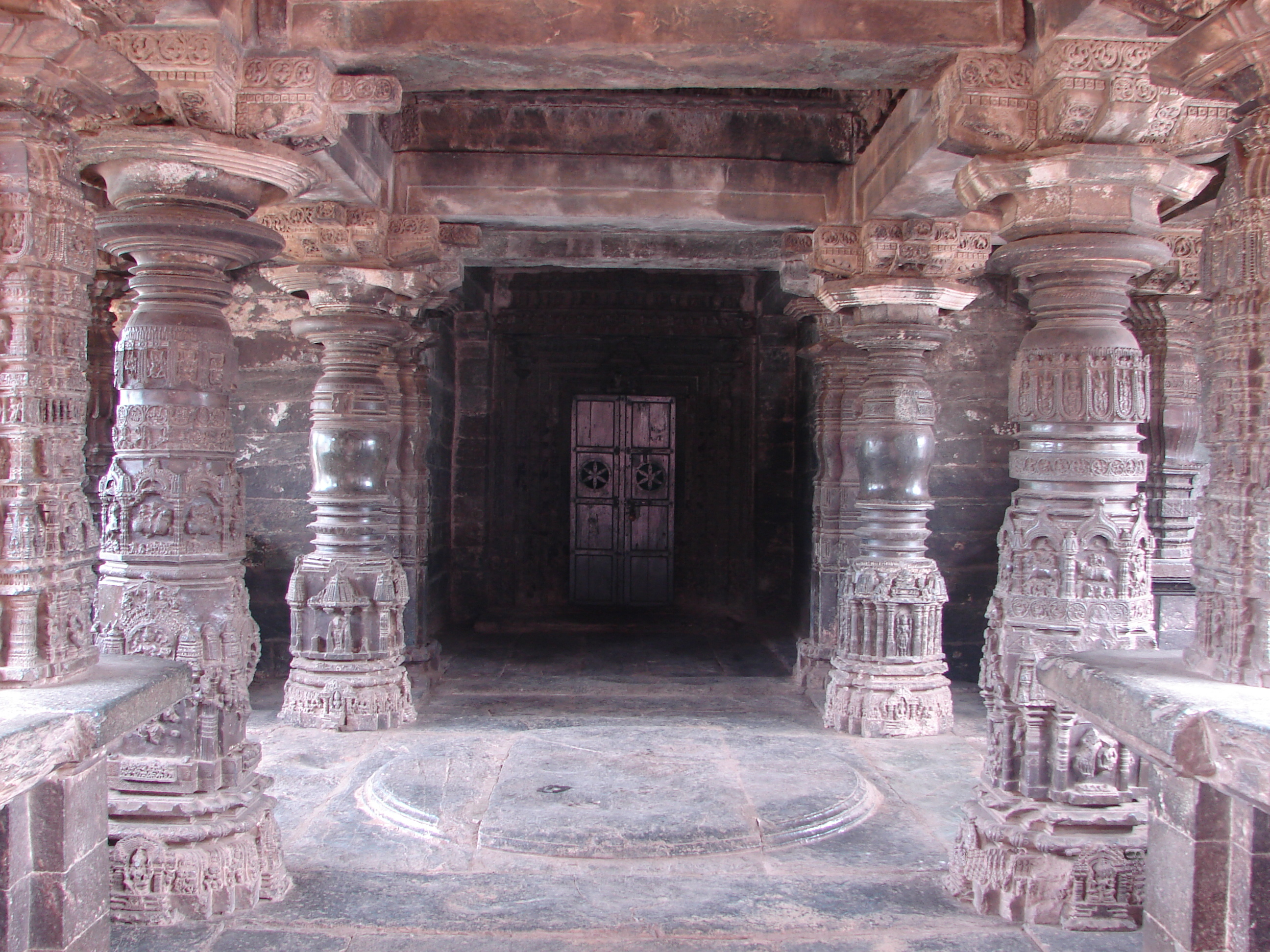
Gadag style pillars, Western Chalukya art.

In 1076 CE, the ascent of the most famous king of this Chalukya family, Vikramaditya VI, changed the balance of power in favour of the Chalukyas. His fifty-year reign was an important period in Karnataka's history and is referred to as the "Chalukya Vikrama era". His victories over the Cholas in the late 11th and early 12th centuries put an end to the Chola influence in the Vengi region permanently. Some of the well-known contemporaneous feudatory families of the Deccan under Chalukya control were the Hoysalas, the Seuna Yadavas of Devagiri, the Kakatiya dynasty and the Southern Kalachuri. At their peak, the Western Chalukyas ruled a vast empire stretching from the Narmada River in the north to the Kaveri River in the south. Vikramaditya VI is considered one of the most influential kings of Indian history. Poet Bilhana in his Sanskrit work wrote "Rama Rajya" regarding his rule; poet Vijnaneshwara called him "A king like none other". Important architectural works were created by these Chalukyas, especially in the Tungabhadra river valley, that served as a conceptual link between the building idioms of the early Badami Chalukyas and the later Hoysalas. With the weakening of the Chalukyas in the decades following the death of Vikramaditya VI in 1126, the feudatories of the Chalukyas gained their independence.

The Kalachuris of Karnataka, whose ancestors were immigrants into the southern deccan from central India, had ruled as a feudatory from Mangalavada (modern Mangalavedhe in Maharashtra). Bijjala II, the most powerful ruler of this dynasty, was a commander (mahamandaleswar) during the reign of Chalukya Vikramaditya VI. Seizing an opportune moment in the waning power of the Chalukyas, Bijjala II declared independence in 1157 and annexed their capital Kalyani. His rule was cut short by his assassination in 1167 and the ensuing civil war caused by his sons fighting over the throne ended the dynasty as the last Chalukya scion regained control of Kalyani. This victory however, was short-lived as the Chalukyas were eventually driven out by the Seuna Yadavas.

=== The Yadavas ===
The Seuna, Sevuna or Yadava dynasty (Marathi: देवगिरीचे यादव, Kannada: ಸೇವುಣರು) (c. 850–1334 CE) was an Indian dynasty, which at its peak ruled a kingdom stretching from the Tungabhadra to the Narmada rivers, including present-day Maharashtra, north Karnataka and parts of Madhya Pradesh, from its capital at Devagiri (present-day Daulatabad in Maharashtra). The Yadavas initially ruled as feudatories of the Western Chalukyas. Around the middle of the 12th century, they declared independence and established rule that reached its peak under Singhana II. The foundations of Marathi culture was laid by the Yadavas and the peculiarities of Maharashtra's social life developed during their rule.

=== The Kakatiyas ===
The Kakatiya dynasty was a South Indian dynasty that ruled Andhra Pradesh and Telangana, India from 1083 to 1323 CE. They were one of the great Telugu kingdoms that lasted for centuries.

=== The Kalachuris ===
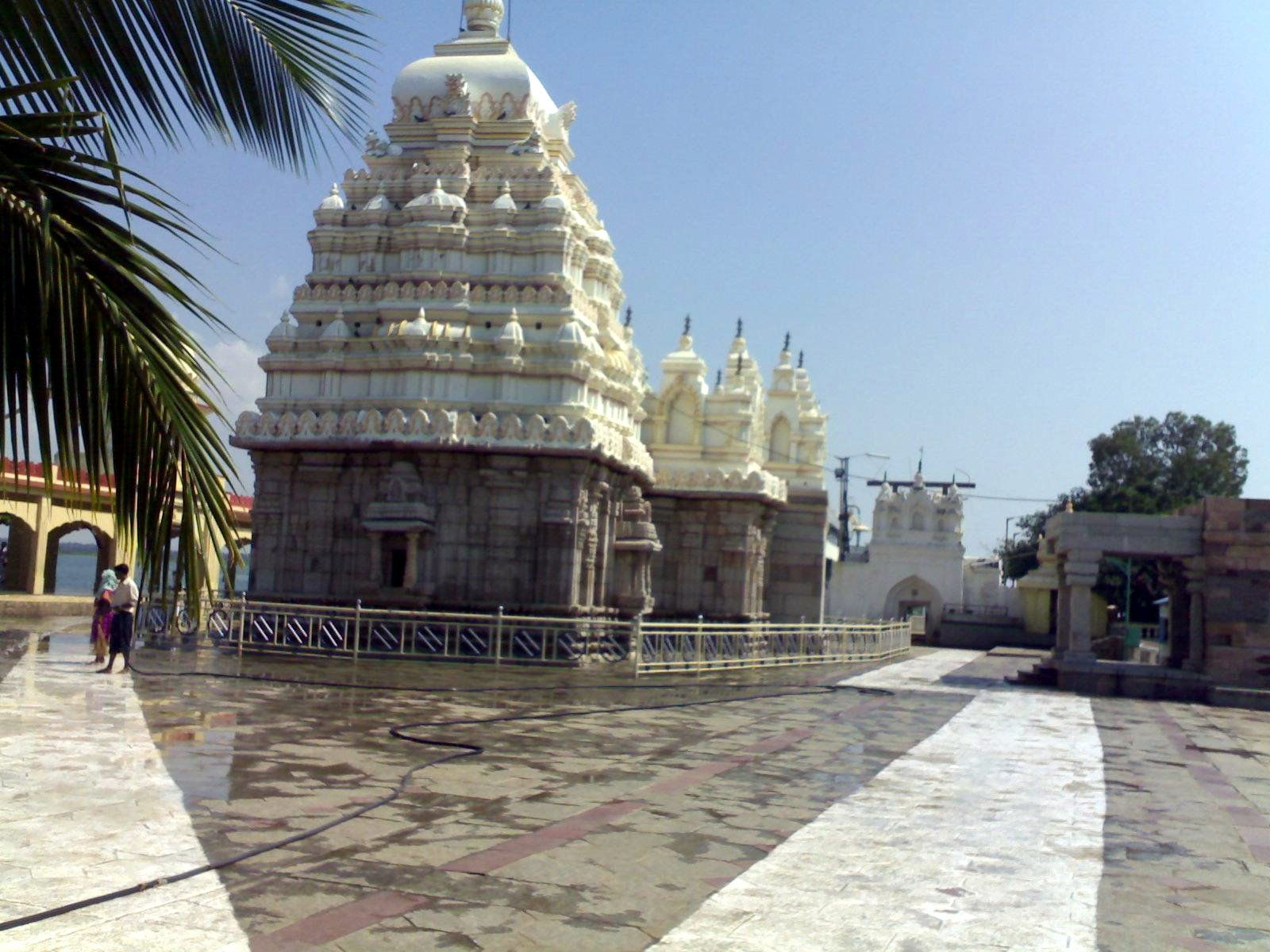
Sangamanatha temple at Kudalasangama, North Karnataka

Kalachuri is the name used by two kingdoms who had a succession of dynasties from the 10th to 12th centuries, one ruling over areas in Central India (west Madhya Pradesh, Rajasthan) and were called Chedi or Haihaya (Heyheya) (northern branch) and the other southern Kalachuri who ruled over parts of Karnataka. They are disparately placed in time and space. Apart from the dynastic name and perhaps a belief in common ancestry, there is little in known sources to connect them.

The earliest known Kalachuri family of Mahishmati (550–620 CE) ruled over northern Maharashtra, Malwa and western Deccan. Their capital was Mahismati situated in the Narmada river valley. There were three prominent members; Krishnaraja, Shankaragana and Buddharaja. They distributed coins and epigraphs around this area.

Kalachuris of Kalyani or the southern Kalachuris (1130–1184 CE) at their peak ruled parts of the Deccan extending over regions of present-day North Karnataka and parts of Maharashtra. This dynasty rose to power in the Deccan between 1156 and 1181 CE. They traced their origins to Krishna who was the conqueror of Kalinjar and Dahala in Madhya Pradesh. It is said that Bijjala a viceroy of this dynasty established the authority over Karnataka. He wrested power from the Chalukya king Taila III. Bijjala was succeeded by his sons Someshwara and Sangama but after 1181 CE, the Chalukyas gradually retrieved the territory. Their rule was a short and turbulent and yet very important from the socio-religious movement point of view; a new sect called the Lingayat or Virashaiva sect was founded during these times.

A unique and purely native form of Kannada literature-poetry called the Vachanas was also born during this time. The writers of Vachanas were called Vachanakaras (poets). Many other important works like Virupaksha Pandita's Chennabasavapurana, Dharani Pandita's Bijjalarayacharite and Chandrasagara Varni's Bijjalarayapurana were also written.

Kalachuris of Tripuri (Chedi) ruled in central India with its base at the ancient city of Tripuri (Tewar); it originated in the 8th century, expanded significantly in the 11th century, and declined in the 12th–13th centuries.

=== The Hoysalas ===
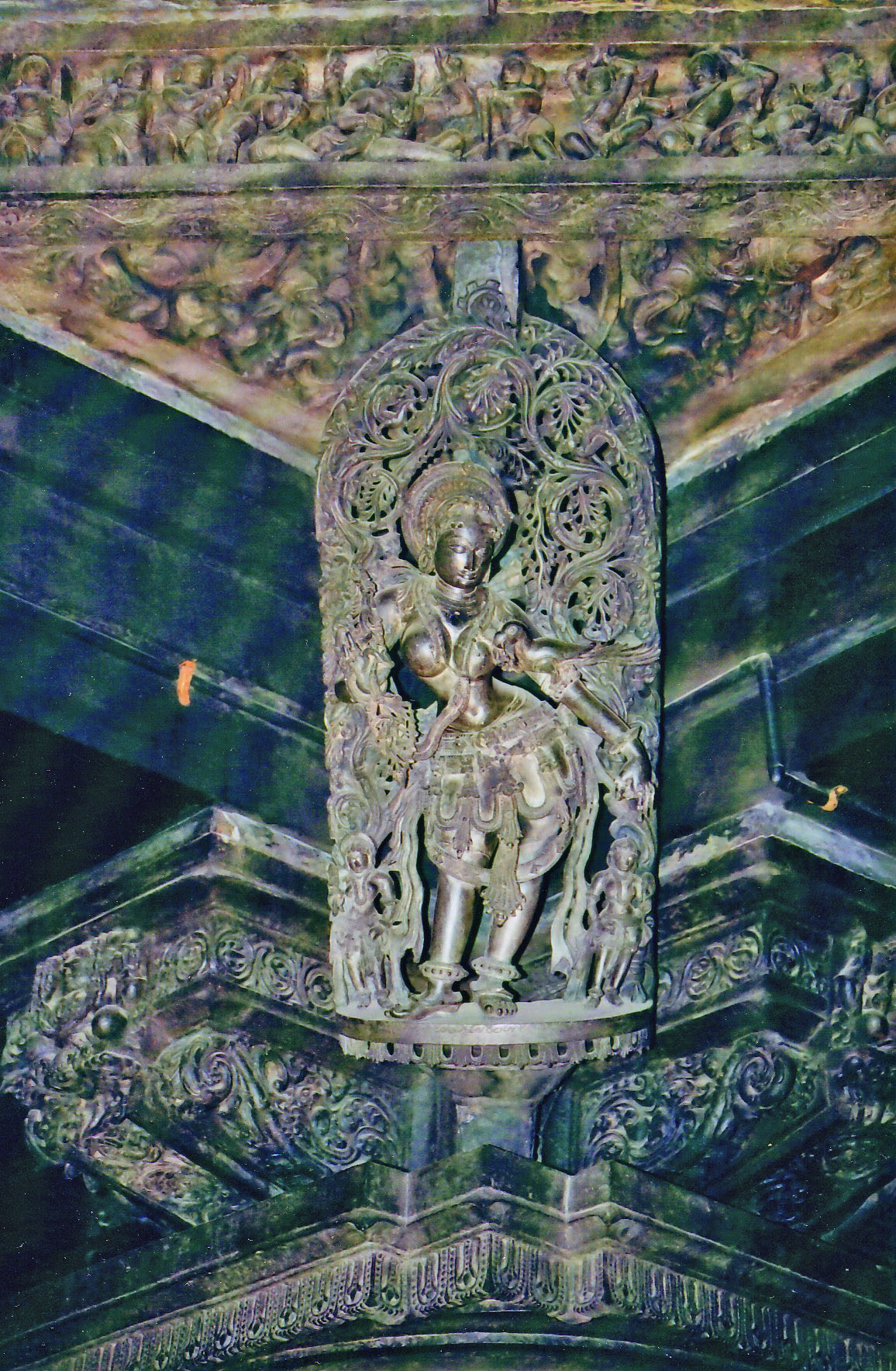
Shilabalika, Chennakeshava temple, Belur.

The Hoysalas had become a powerful force even during their rule from Belur in the 11th century as a feudatory of the Chalukyas (in the south Karnataka region). In the early 12th century they successfully fought the Cholas in the south, convincingly defeating them in the battle of Talakad and moved their capital to nearby Halebidu. Historians refer to the founders of the dynasty as natives of Malnad Karnataka, based on the numerous inscriptions calling them Maleparolganda or "Lord of the Male (hills) chiefs" (Malepas). (Note: Natives of south Karnataka,) With the waning of the Western Chalukya power, the Hoysalas declared their independence in the late 12th century.

During this period of Hoysala control, distinctive Kannada literary metres such as Ragale (blank verse), Sangatya (meant to be sung to the accompaniment of a musical instrument), Shatpadi (seven line) etc. became widely accepted. The Hoysalas expanded the Vesara architecture stemming from the Chalukyas,culminating in the Hoysala architectural articulation and style as exemplified in the construction of the Chennakesava Temple at Belur and the Hoysaleswara temple at Halebidu. Both these temples were built in commemoration of the victories of the Hoysala Vishnuvardhana against the Cholas in 1116. Veera Ballala II, (Note: Kamath cites J. Duncan M. Derrett and William Coelho as considering Ballala II as the most outstanding of the Hoysala kings.) the most effective of the Hoysala rulers, defeated the aggressive Pandya when they invaded the Chola kingdom and assumed the titles "Establisher of the Chola Kingdom" (Cholarajyapratishtacharya), "Emperor of the south" (Dakshina Chakravarthi) and "Hoysala emperor" (Hoysala Chakravarthi). The Hoysalas extended their foothold in areas known today as Tamil Nadu around 1225, making the city of Kannanur Kuppam near Srirangam a provincial capital. This gave them control over South Indian politics that began a period of Hoysala hegemony in the southern Deccan.

In the early 13th century, with the Hoysala power remaining unchallenged, the first of the Muslim incursions into South India began. After over two decades of waging war against a foreign power, the Hoysala ruler at the time, Veera Ballala III, died in the battle of Madurai in 1343. This resulted in the merger of the sovereign territories of the Hoysala empire with the areas administered by Harihara I, founder of the Vijayanagara Empire, located in the Tungabhadra region in present-day Karnataka. The new kingdom thrived for another two centuries with Vijayanagara as its capital. (Note: Two theories exist about the origin of Harihara I and his brother Bukka Raya I. One states that they were Kannadiga commanders of the Hoysala army and another that they were Telugu speakers and commanders of the earlier Kakatiya Kingdom.)

=== The Cholas ===
Chola Empire under Rajendra Chola c. 1030 CE

By the 9th century, under Rajaraja Chola and his son Rajendra Chola, the Cholas rose as a notable power in south Asia. The Chola Empire stretched as far as Bengal. At its peak, the empire spanned almost 3,600,000 km^{2} (1,389,968 sq mi). Rajaraja Chola conquered all of peninsular South India and parts of Sri Lanka. Rajendra Chola's navies went even further, occupying coasts from Burma (now Myanmar) to Vietnam, the Andaman and Nicobar Islands, Lakshadweep, Sumatra, Java, Malaya in South East Asia and Pegu islands. He also conquered the rest of the Sri Lanka.He defeated Mahipala, the king of the Bengal, and to commemorate his victory he built a new capital and named it Gangaikonda Cholapuram.

The Cholas excelled in building magnificent temples. Brihadeshwara Temple in Thanjavur is a classical example of the magnificent architecture of the Chola kingdom. Brihadshwara temple is an UNESCO Heritage Site under "Great Living Chola Temples". Another example is the Chidambaram Temple in the heart of the temple town of Chidambaram.

== See also ==
- History of India
- History of Hinduism
- History of Bengal
- History of Bihar
- Political history of medieval Karnataka

== Notes ==
Timeline and cultural period	Indus plain (Punjab-Sapta Sindhu-Gujarat)	Gangetic Plain			Central India	Southern India
Timeline and cultural period	Indus plain (Punjab-Sapta Sindhu-Gujarat)	Upper Gangetic Plain (Ganga-Yamuna doab)	Middle Gangetic Plain	Lower Gangetic Plain	Central India	Southern India
IRON AGE
Culture	Late Vedic Period	Late Vedic Period; Painted Grey Ware culture	Late Vedic Period; Northern Black Polished Ware		Pre-history	
6th century BCE	Gandhara	Kuru-Panchala	Magadha		Adivasi (tribes)	Assaka
Culture	Persian-Greek influences	"Second Urbanisation"; Rise of Shramana movements Jainism - Buddhism - Ājīvika - Yoga			Pre-history	
5th century BCE	(Persian conquests)		Shaishunaga dynasty		Adivasi (tribes)	Assaka
4th century BCE	(Greek conquests)	Nanda empire				
HISTORICAL AGE
Culture	Spread of Buddhism				Pre-history	
3rd century BCE	Maurya Empire					Satavahana dynasty Sangam period (300 BCE – 200 CE); Early Cholas; Early Pandyan kingdom Cheras
Culture	Preclassical Hinduism (Note: Michaels (2004) p.39) - "Hindu Synthesis" (Note: Hiltebeitel (2002)) (ca. 200 BCE - 300 CE) (Note: Michaels (2004) p.39) (Note: Hiltebeitel (2002)); Epics - Puranas - Ramayana - Mahabharata - Bhagavad Gita - Brahma Sutras - Smarta Tradition; Mahayana Buddhism					
2nd century BCE	Indo-Greek Kingdom		Shunga Empire; Maha-Meghavahana Dynasty			Satavahana dynasty Sangam period (300 BCE – 200 CE); Early Cholas; Early Pandyan kingdom Cheras
1st century BCE	Indo-Greek Kingdom		Shunga Empire; Maha-Meghavahana Dynasty			Satavahana dynasty Sangam period (300 BCE – 200 CE); Early Cholas; Early Pandyan kingdom Cheras
1st century CE	Indo-Scythians; Indo-Parthians		Kuninda Kingdom			Satavahana dynasty Sangam period (300 BCE – 200 CE); Early Cholas; Early Pandyan kingdom Cheras
2nd century	Kushan Empire					Satavahana dynasty Sangam period (300 BCE – 200 CE); Early Cholas; Early Pandyan kingdom Cheras
3rd century	Kushano-Sasanian Kingdom; Western Satraps	Kushan Empire		Kamarupa kingdom	Adivasi (tribes)	Satavahana dynasty Sangam period (300 BCE – 200 CE); Early Cholas; Early Pandyan kingdom Cheras
Culture	"Golden Age of Hinduism"(ca. CE 320-650) (Note: Michaels (2004) p.40); Puranas - Kural; Co-existence of Hinduism and Buddhism					
4th century	Kidarites	Gupta Empire; Varman dynasty				Andhra Ikshvakus; Kalabhra dynasty Kadamba Dynasty; Western Ganga Dynasty
5th century	Hephthalite Empire	Alchon Huns				Vishnukundina; Kalabhra dynasty
6th century	Nezak Huns; Kabul Shahi; Maitraka				Adivasi (tribes)	Vishnukundina; Badami Chalukyas; Kalabhra dynasty
Culture	Late-Classical Hinduism (ca. CE 650-1100) (Note: Michaels (2004) p.41); Advaita Vedanta - Tantra; Decline of Buddhism in India					
7th century	Indo-Sassanids		Vakataka dynasty Empire of Harsha	Mlechchha dynasty	Adivasi (tribes)	Badami Chalukyas; Eastern Chalukyas; Pandyan kingdom (revival); Pallava
7th century	Karkota dynasty				Adivasi (tribes)	
8th century	Kabul Shahi	Pala Empire			Adivasi (tribes)	Eastern Chalukyas; Pandyan kingdom Kalachuri
9th century	Gurjara-Pratihara				Adivasi (tribes)	Rashtrakuta Empire; Eastern Chalukyas; Pandyan kingdom Medieval Cholas; Chera Perumals of Makkotai
10th century	Ghaznavids			Pala dynasty Kamboja-Pala dynasty	Adivasi (tribes)	Kalyani Chalukyas; Eastern Chalukyas; Medieval Cholas; Chera Perumals of Makkotai; Rashtrakuta
References and sources for table References Sources: Flood, Gavin D. (1996), An Introduction to Hinduism, Cambridge University Press; Hiltebeitel, Alf (2002), Hinduism. In: Joseph Kitagawa, "The Religious Traditions of Asia: Religion, History, and Culture", Routledge; Michaels, Axel (2004), Hinduism. Past and present, Princeton, New Jersey: Princeton University Press
