= Kamarupa (late to end period) =

Kamarupa – Late to end period was a period of Kamarupa kingdom from founding of Pala Dynasty by Brahma Pala to last ruler of dynasty Jaya Pala.

== Foundation of Pala Dynasty ==
Brahma Pala became the ruler of Kamarupa when Tyaga Singha of Mlechha dynasty died heirless to succeed him the people elected Brahma Pala to be their king. The ruler was legitimized with the claim that Brahma Pala was a descendant of the Varman dynasty and that he was elected by the people. He married Kula Devi by whom he had it son named Ratna Pala. It is not known whether Brahma Pala had a long reign like his son but it appears that when Ratna Pala grew up Brahma Pala abdicated in his favour.

== Outside invasions ==
During Brahma Pala's reign Kamarupa was attacked by Jatavarman, son of Vajravarman of the Varman dynasty which ruled probably in Eastern Magadha when the Pala power began to wane. This invasion is mentioned in the Belava copper-plate inscription of Bhojavarman, the grandson of Jatavarman, who thereby granted lands in the Paundra bhukti, the grant being issued from the victorious camp at Vikramapura. It is stated in verse 8 of this inscription that It appears that Jatavarman invaded Kamarupa and defeated its king but could not annex the kingdom. It is probable that after this defeat Brahma Pala abdicated in favour of his son Ratna Pala who appears to have removed the capital to Guwahati, on the banks of the Brahmaputra, and, after fortifying it, called it Durjaya or impregnable.

== Capital ==
Ratna Pala fortified the capital city called it Sri-Durjaya.

There are two copper-plate inscriptions of Ratna Pala, known as the Bargaon and the Sualkuchi grants.

== Line of Kings ==
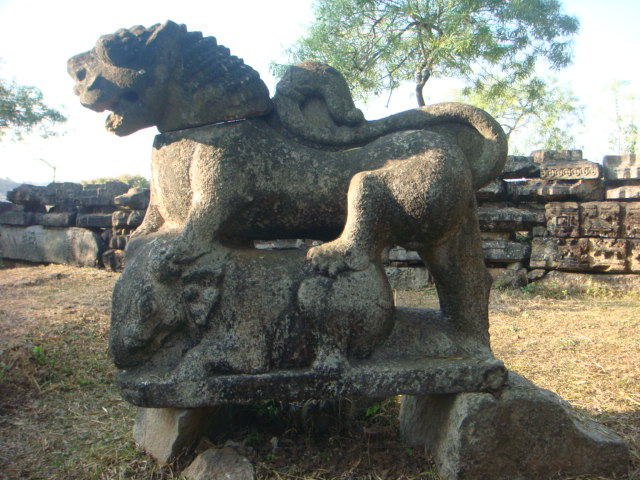
9th-10th century lion-sculpture representing powerful Kamarupa-Palas, Madan Kamdev, Baihata Chariali, Assam

== See also ==
- Varman Dynasty
