= Dharma Pala =

King of Kamarupa
- Reign: 1035 – 1060
- Predecessor: Harsha Pala
- Successor: Jaya Pala
- Dynasty: Pala
- Father: Harsha Pala
- Religion: Hinduism (Shaivism)

Dharma Pala (1035–1060) was ruler of Pala dynasty of Kamarupa Kingdom. He was the son and the successor of Harsha Pala.

== Inscriptions ==
Three copper plates are found from Dharma's reign:

1. Khonamukh plates
2. Subhankarapataka grant
3. Pushpabhadra plates

The first and second charters were composed by the same poet since they are couched in similar language and were issued by Dharma Pala - Resplendent in the grandiosity and pomposity of usual titles. The Khonamukh charter was issued in the first year of his reign. The donee was Bhatta Mahabahu, a son of Vishnu and grandson of Ummoka and sprang from a Brahmin family, belonging to the Kashyap caste and the Kanva Shakha of the Yajurveda and hailing from Madhya Desa. The charter at serial 2 was issued in the third regnal year. The donee was from the village Krodanja in Shravasti, known for its learned Brahmins. The said village has been identified with Karanja in Dinajpur District, Bangladesh. The name of Krodanja is elsewhere found as Krodanchi and Kolanchi, which was centre of learned Brahmins in the Kannauj region of Uttar Pradesh and the Brahmins of this place, who settled in north Bengal appears to have given the name of their old habitation to their new habitat as in the cases of Sravasti and Tarkari.

== Kamarupanagar ==
The introduction of the first two prashastis is exception in the sense that it has the name of its composer, Prasthanakalsa, unlike the earlier inscription in Assam, excepting the Gachtal copper plate inscription of Gopala, composed by Balabhadra. The mention of Dharmapala as "flourishing in a city called Kamarupanagar" in Aniruddha's prashati has created controversy, for the capital of Brahma Pala line is named Hadappaka in some records and Durjaya in others. It is also accepted that Ratna Pala transferred his capital to Durjaya and Gopala restored it to Hadappaka. It is thus difficult to determine if Kamarupanagar is same as Hadappaka or it is different and a new city altogether.

According to Bhattacharya (1933), Dharma Pala's capital has to be identified with the city that later was known as Kamatapur on the Dharla River, a tributary of the Brahmaputra River. Since the ruins of Kamatapur lie 14 miles (23 km) south-west of Cooch Behar and 40 miles (64 km) from Dhubri on the Brahmaputra, observations of Bhattacharya lacks credence, more so because of the evidence later revealed by the Gachtal plates.

In 1809, Francis Buchanan-Hamilton spoke of the ruins of Dharma Pala's city near Dimla in Rangpur district of Bangladesh, about 2 miles (3.2 km) from the Teesta River and regarded the King as belonging to Pala Dynasty of Kamarupa. There is a belief that Dharmapala did build a city in the western fringe of his domain. There is no satisfactory evidence to identify Dharma Pala's capital Kamarupanagar with Kamatapur, particularly as the two names have no resemblance. But tradition associated Dharma Pala not with Kamatapur but with a city about 35 miles (56 km) away.
