= Guwakuchi =

Guakuchi
- Village
- Location in Assam, India Guakuchi (India)
- Coordinates: 26.40°N 91.42°E
- Country: India
- State: Assam
- Region: Western Assam
- District: Nalbari

Government
  - Body: Gram panchayat
- Elevation: 42 m (138 ft)

Population (2001)
  - Total: 1,148,824

Languages
  - Official: Assamese
- Time zone: UTC+5:30 (IST)
- Telephone code: 03624
- ISO 3166 code: IN-AS
- Vehicle registration: AS-14-XXXX
- Website: nalbari.nic.in

Guwakuchi or Guakuchi is a village near Nalbari town in India.

Copper plate inscriptions have been found there of Kamarupa Kings of the Pala dynasty, especially of Indra Pala.

== See also ==
- Varman Dynasty
- Villages of Nalbari District
