= Indra Pala =

King of Kamarupa (ruled 960–990)

King of Kamarupa
- Predecessor: Ratna Pala
- Successor: Go Pala
- Spouse: Rajyadevi of Rastrakuta dynasty
- Issue: Go Pala
- Dynasty: Pala
- Father: Purandara Pala
- Mother: Durlabha, princess of Prajya
- Religion: Hinduism (Shaivism)

Indra Pala (ruled 960–990) was ruler of Pala Dynasty (900–1100) of Kamarupa Kingdom.

Ratna Pala's son, Purandera Pala, predeceased him, and thus the later's son, Indra Pala, his grandson became successor. He issued two copper plate grants in 8th year (Guwahati plates) and 28th year (Guwakuchi plates) of his reign. In these records the king is adorned in grandiose epithets. The epithet Varaha (descendant of the Boar incarnation of Vishnu) is applied for the first time to Pragjyotisha king who is also described as Prachi-Pradipa (the light of the east) and a past master of grammar (Pada), Vakya (Mimamsa), logic (Tarka), and Tantra. The donee of Guwakuchi grant belongs to Deva family, which is now a non-Brahminical cognomen in Bengal. His family belonged to Vai village in the land called Savathi (Sanskrit, Sravasti); same as the modern Baigram near Hili railway station in Bogra district of Bangladesh. The area was formerly known as Pahuni yojana which later came to be known as Sravasti, apparently, because a larger number of Brahmins had settled there from Sravasti, a well-known ancient centre of learning in UP. It was also the capital of old Kosala Janapada and an early centre of Buddhism and was situated at the site of modern Set-Mahet on the border of Gonda and Bahraich districts.

A unique and interesting feature of Guwakuchi grant is that after the details of gift land, there is enumeration of no less than 32 names of the Paramesvara i.e., the reigning monarch. Some of the serials are given here (1) Kirti-Kamalini-Martanda (He who is like Martanda causing the lotuses embodying fame to bloom) (6) Arasika-Bhima, (28) Medini-Tilaka (tilaka of the earth), (31) Turanga-Revanta (Revanta among the horses), (32) Haragirija-Charana-Pankaja-Rajo-Ranjitottamanga (He whose head is bedecked with the dust from the lotus-feet of Shiva & Parvati).

Indra Pala who was addicted more to study than to war, was succeeded by his son Go Pala (990-1015 AD) and the latter by his son Harsha Pala. Earlier there was no information about these two rulers, but copper plate grant issued by Go Pala and found at Gachtal, near Doboka in Nagaon district, has changed it all.
