= Ratna Pala =

King of Kamarupa
- Predecessor: Brahma Pala
- Successor: Indra Pala
- Dynasty: Pala
- Father: Brahma Pala
- Mother: Kuladevi
- Religion: Hinduism (Shaivism)

Ratna Pala (reigned 920-960) was the son of Brahma Pala in Pala Dynasty (900–1100) of Kamarupa Kingdom. He was succeeded by his grandson Indra Pala.

The Gachtal plates of Go Pala have thrown fresh light on the achievements and date of Ratna Pala. An inscription states that Ratna Pala of Pragjyotisha-Kamarupa defeated King Rajyapala (908-40 AD) of Pala Empire of Bengal and advanced as far as the Ganges in the heart of Pala empire. This achievement is not mentioned in any earlier record of the family. The inscription mentioned Rajyapala of Bengal, advancing the dates of Pala's reign to the 1st half of the 10th century from the 1st half of the 11th century. The Dacca copperplate inscription states that Srichandra, the Chandra king of Samatata-Harikela aided Rajyapala's son Gopala III to be crowned king by defeating Kamarupa armies in the Brahmaputra Valley & in the process, rescuing Rajyapala's wife, whom Ratna Pala had kidnapped & carried away to Kamarupa.

The Baragaon plates, issued in the 25th regnal year of Ratnapala suggests that Brahma Pala abdicated in favour of his son. The author of the inscription extravagantly praised Ratna Pala, describing him as a terror to the Saka king [since there was no Saka king at Ratnapala's time, the reference may be to the Hindu Shahis who were sometimes represented as the descendants of the Kushans]; to the Lord of Gurjaras (apparently the Gurjara-Pratiharas of Kanauj); to the Gauda monarch (Rajyapala, 908-40 AD, of Bengal and Bihar); to the ruler of Kerala; to the Vahikas (often spelt Bahikas; of Punjab, particularly in the Sialkot region); to the Tayikas (also spelt Tajika; they were Arabs, no doubt meaning the Arabs of Sind in the present case) as well as the Dakshinatya kings. These claims, barring the case of the Gauda king, we poetical exaggerations by the scribe. The basis of such claims was nothing more than the receipt of a present from a source such as a visiting trader.

The Baragaon and Sualkuchi plate grants of Ratna Pala were issued in his 25th and 36th regnal years when the king was residing at Durjaya (capital). The Carabari plates, last to be discovered, were issued during the 12th regnal year when the king was at Hadappaka, identified with Hadappesvara (named after the Isvara ie, Siva or Sivalinga worshipped at Hadappa or Hadappaka) and was the capital of the kings of Salastambha line.

He was the builder of many Siva temples, the donor of much wealth to the Brahmins, the performer of some sacrifices and the like (Indra Pala grant).
