= Go Pala =

King of Kamarupa
- Predecessor: Indra Pala
- Successor: Harsha Pala
- Spouse: Nayanadevi
- Issue: Harsha Pala
- Dynasty: Pala
- Father: Indra Pala
- Mother: Rajyadevi of Rastrakuta dynasty

Go Pala was successor and son of Indra Pala and his queen Rajya Devi, of Pala Dynasty of Kamarupa Kingdom, who ruled for the period 990-1015 A.D.

The following description is taken from the copper plate grant of Dharma Pala:

"In his (Brahma Pala's) family there was a king called Go Pala who was skilled in politics and had deep regard for religion. His valour burnt the enemies as fire burns a forest. That famous and spirited king had a wife of the name of Nayana of noble reputation. She bore a son the illustrious Harsha Pala."
