= Harsha Pala =

King of Kamarupa
- Predecessor: Go Pala
- Successor: Dharma Pala
- Spouse: Ratnadevi
- Issue: Dharma Pala
- Dynasty: Pala
- Father: Go Pala
- Mother: Nayanadevi

Harsha Pala was son of Go Pala, the ruler of Pala Dynasty of Kamarupa Kingdom and Queen Nayana. He ruled for the period 1015-1035 A.D.

Copper plate description of Dharma Pala states that famous and spirited king Go Pala had a wife of the name of Nayana of noble reputation. She bore a son the illustrious Harsha Pala who was like the lamp of the Pala line and whose reputation spread over the three worlds.
