= Pala dynasty (Kamarupa) =

Medieval dynasty of Kamarupa

Kamarupa Kingdom
- 900 CE–1100 CE
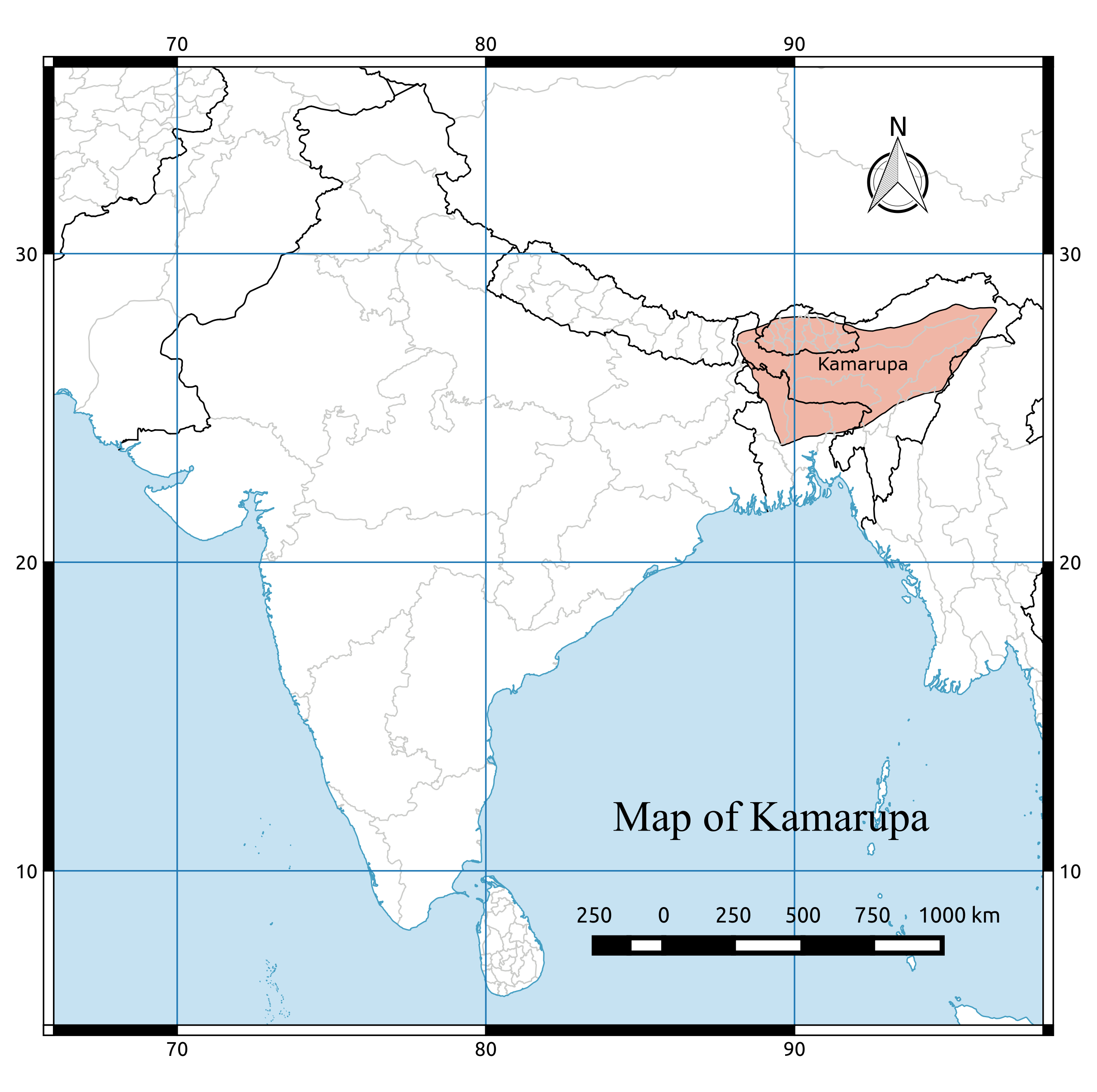
- The traditional boundary of the Kamarupa kingdom
- Capital: Harruppeshvar (present-day Tezpur), Durjaya (present-day North Guwahati), Kamarupanagara (present-day North Guwahati)
- Religion: Hinduism
- Government: Monarchy
- Maharajadhiraja
  - c900 – c920: Brahma Pala
  - c920 – c960: Ratna Pala
  - c960 – c990: Indra Pala
  - c990 – 1015: Go Pala
  - c1015 – c1035: Harsha Pala
  - c1035 – c1060: Dharma Pala
  - c1075 – c1100: Jaya Pala
- Historical era: Classical India
  - Established: 900 CE
  - Disestablished: 1100 CE
Preceded by
Mlechchha dynasty
Succeeded by
Kachari kingdom
Chutia kingdom
Baro-Bhuyan
Kamata Kingdom
Ahom dynasty

The Pala dynasty of Kamarupa kingdom ruled from the 10th century CE. Like the Pala Empire of Bengal, the first ruler in this dynasty was elected, which probably explains the name of this dynasty "Pala". The Hindu orthodoxy drew their lineage from the earlier Varman dynasty and thus ultimately from Narakasura i.e. Bhauma dynasty. The dynasty is unrelated to the previous Varman and Mlecchna dynasties.

The Palas were the last dynasty to rule Kamarupa. After the collapse of the Pala rule, Kamarupa disintegrated, to be followed in due course by the Ahom, Chutia, Kamata, and Kachari kingdoms, and the confederate rule of the Baro-Bhuyans.

== History ==
The term "Kamarupa" rarely appeared in the records of the Pala rulers; instead they used Pragjyotisha, the legendary kingdom of the epics, to legitimise their authority. The Pala kings of Kamarupa assumed the title of paramadaivata paramabhattāraka mahārājādirāja (the imperial title of the Guptas), sri-vārāha (the one who can trace his origin to Varāha) and prāigjyotisādhipati (the ruler of Prāgjyotisa). The Pala dynasty came to an end when Kamarupa was invaded by the Gaur king Ramapala (c. 1072–1126). Timgyadeva was made the governor of Kamarupa who ruled between 1110 and 1126. Timgyadeva threw off the yoke of the Pala king and ruled independently for some years when he was attacked and replaced by Vaidyadeva under Ramapala's son Kumarapala. Vaidyadeva, who ruled between 1126 and 1140, declared independence within four years of his rule after the death of Kumarapala. Both Timgyadeva and Vaidyadeva issued grants in the style of the Kamarupa kings (three copper plates attached to the seal of the Kamarupa kings by a ring). The work of the Pala dynasty of Kamarupa is reflected in the Madan Kamdev sculpture.

== Rulers ==
- Brahma Pala (900-920)
- Ratna Pala (920-960)
- Indra Pala (960-990)
- Go Pala, also Gopalavarman (990-1015)
- Harsha Pala (1015-1035)
- Dharma Pala (1035-1060)
- Jaya Pala (1075-1100)

== Bibliography ==
- Baruah, S L (1986), A Comprehensive History of Assam, Munshiram Manoharlal
- Sircar, D. C. The Bhauma-Naraka or the Pala Dynasty of Brahmapala, The Comprehensive History of Assam, ed H. K. Barpujari, Guwahati, 1990.
- Shin, Jae-Eun (2018), "Region Formed and Imagined: Reconsidering temporal, spatial and social context of Kamarupa", in Dzüvichü, Lipokmar; Baruah, Manjeet (eds.), Modern Practices in North East India: History, Culture, Representation, London & New York: Routledge, pp. 23–55
- *Saikia, Yasmin (2004). Fragmented Memories: Struggling to be Tai-Ahom in India. Duke University Press. ISBN 9780822333739.
- Ghosh, Suchandra (November 2014). "Understanding Boundary Representations in the Copper-plate Charters of Early Kāmarūpa". Indian Historical Review. 41 (2): 207–222. doi:10.1177/0376983614544568.
- Barpujari, Heramba Kanta (1990). The Comprehensive History of Assam: Volume 1. Vol. 1. Guwahati: Publication Board, Assam.
