= Brahma Pala =

King of Kamarupa
- Reign: 900-920
- Heir apparent: Ratna Pala
- Born: Durjaya
- Dynasty: Pala

Brahma Pala (reigned 993-1010) was the founder of the Pala Dynasty (900–1100) of the Kamarupa kingdom. He married Kula Devi, by whom he had a successor to his throne named Ratna Pala.

== See also ==
- Kamarupa - Late to end period
- Pushyavarman
- Bhaskaravarman
