= Durjaya (Kamarupa capital) =

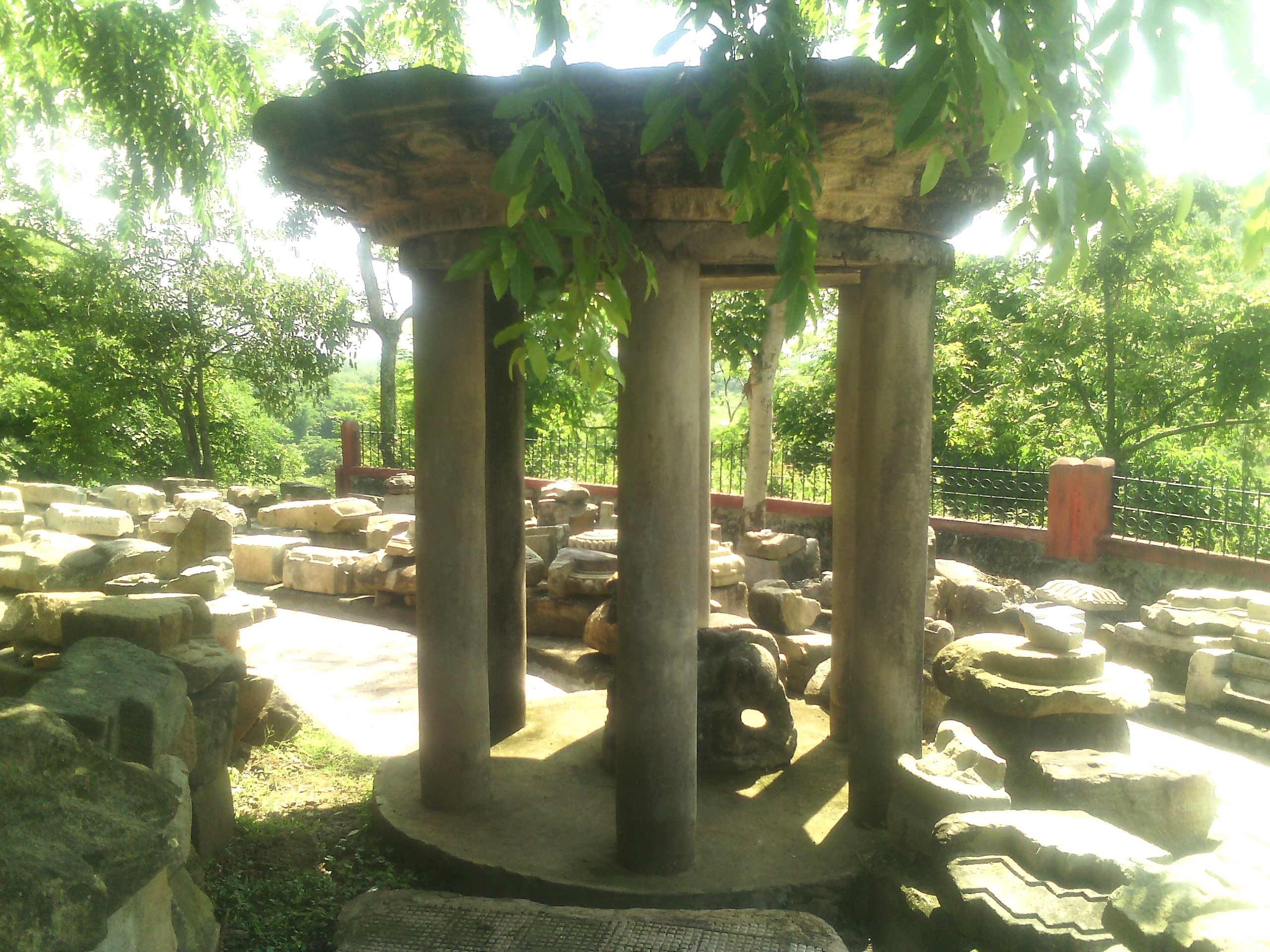
An Pala structure in Madan Kamdev

Durjaya, now North Guwahati, was capital of Kamarupa kingdom under the Pala Dynasty for the period 900 to 1100 C.E. Pala rulers built their capital on the banks of the Brahmaputra and surrounded it with a rampart and a strong palisade, whence they named it Durjaya which means impregnable . Many wealthy merchants lived there in safety and it boasted of many plastered turrets. Encouraged by the King, the learned men, religious preceptors, and poets made it a place of resort.

== See also ==
- Varman Dynasty
