= List of rulers of Assam =

The history of Assam is the history of a confluence of people from the east, west, south and the north; the confluence of the Austroasiatic, Tibeto-Burman (Sino-Tibetan), Tai and Indo-Aryan cultures. Although invaded over the centuries, it was never a vassal or a colony to an external power until the third Burmese invasion in 1821 and subsequently the British ingress into Assam in 1824 during the First Anglo-Burmese War.

Later documented rulers, and dynasties who are deemed to have ruled a portion of Assam are included in this list.

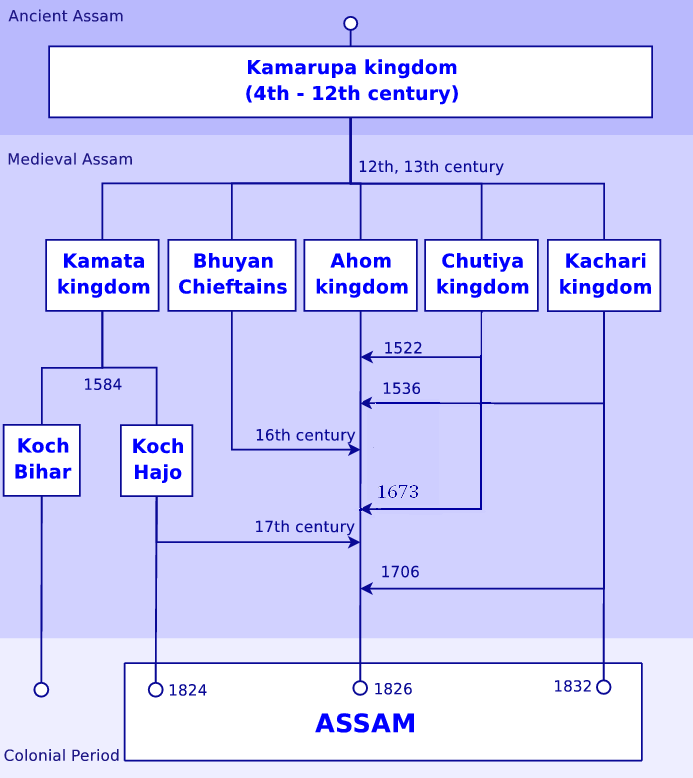
Major kingdoms of Assam

== Ancient Period (c. 1200 BCE – 350 CE) ==
=== Sonitpura (Asura) kingdom ===
The kingdom was contemporary of Pragjyotisha kingdom of Kamarupa.

Nu.	Name of known rulers
1	Marichi
2	Kashyap
3	Hiranyakashipu
4	Prahlad
5	Virochana
6	Mahabali
7	Bana

=== Pragjyotisha kingdom ===
==== Danava dynasty ====
First legendary line of rulers in Pragjyotisha. The Danava dynasty consisted of Kirata chiefs; the last of whom, Ghatakasura, was killed and replaced by Naraka.

Known Danava rulers of Pragjyotisha are:

- Mahiranga
- Hatakasura
- Sambarasura
- Ratnasura
- Ghatakasura

==== Bhauma (Naraka) dynasty ====
Second legendary dynasty of Pragjyotisha. Known Bhauma rulers of Pragjyotisha are:

- Naraka
- Bhagadatta
- Pushpadatta
- Vajradatta

=== Davaka kingdom (c. 100 – 500 CE) ===
Less information is available about this kingdom.

== Classical Period : Kamarupa dynesties (350 – 1100 CE) ==
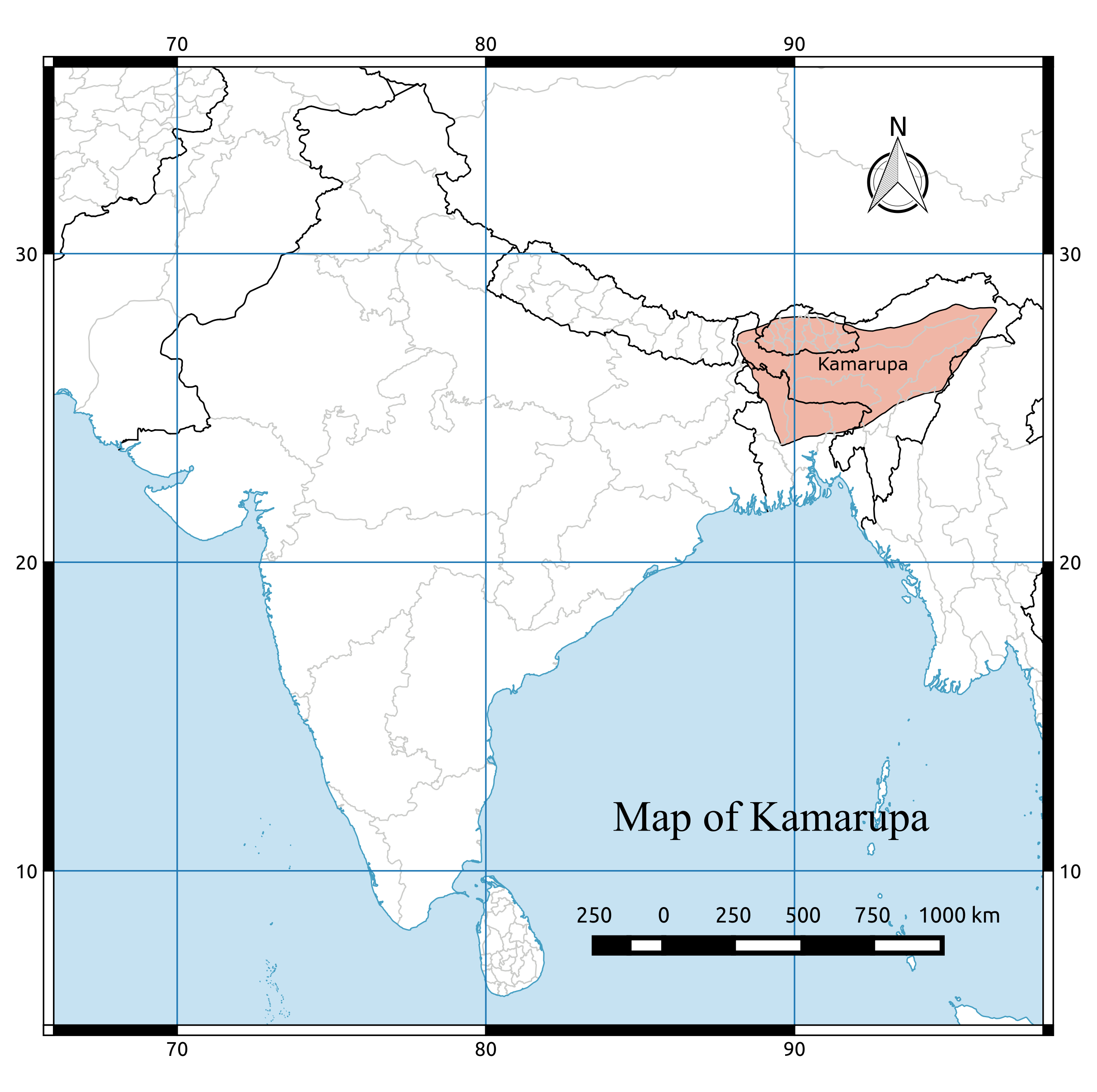
The traditional extent of the Kamarupa kingdom

=== Varman dynasty (350 – 650 CE) ===
The dynastic line as given in the Dubi copperplate inscription and Nidhanpur copperplate inscription are as:

	Reign	Name	Succession	Queen
1	350–374 CE	Pushyavarman		(unknown)
2	374–398 CE	Samudravarman	son of Pushyavarman	Dattadevi
3	398–422 CE	Balavarman	son of Samudravarman	Ratnavati
4	422–446 CE	Kalyanavarman	son of Balavarman	Gandharavati
5	446–470 CE	Ganapativarman	son of Kalyanavarman	Yajnavati
6	470–494 CE	Mahendravarman	son of Ganapativarman	Suvrata
7	494–518 CE	Narayanavarman	son of Mahendravarman	Devavati
8	518–542 CE	Bhutivarman	son of Narayanavarman	Vijnayavati
9	542–566 CE	Chandramukhavarman	son of Bhutivarman	Bhogavati
10	566–590 CE	Sthitavarman	son of Chandramukhavarman	Nayanadevi
11	590–595 CE	Susthitavarman	son of Sthitavarman	Syamadevi
12	595–600 CE	Supratisthitavarman	son of Susthitavarman	(Bachelor)
13	600–650 CE	Bhaskaravarman	brother of Supratisthitavarman	(Bachelor)
14	650–655 CE	Unknown	(unknown)	(unknown)

The grants of Ratnapala give the list of 21 kings from Salastambha to his line.

=== Mlechchha dynasty (650 – 900 CE) ===
- Salastamba (650–670 CE)
- Vijaya alias Vigrahastambha
- Palaka
- Kumara
- Vajradeva
- Harshadeva alias Harshavarman (725–745 CE)
- Balavarman II
- Jivaraja
- Digleswaravarman
- Salambha
- Harjjaravarman (815–832 CE)
- Vanamalavarmadeva (832–855 CE)
- Jayamala alias Virabahu (855–860 CE)
- Balavarman III (860–880 CE)
- Tyagasimha (890–900 CE)

=== Pala dynasty (Kamarupa) (900 – 1100 CE) ===
- Brahma Pala (900–920 CE)
- Ratna Pala (920–960 CE)
- Indra Pala (960–990 CE)
- Go Pala also Gopalavarman (990–1015 CE)
- Harsha Pala (1015–1035 CE)
- Dharma Pala (1035–1060 CE)
- Jaya Pala (1075–1100 CE)

== Medieval Period (c. 1100 – 1800 CE) ==
=== Ahom dynasty (1228 – 1838 CE) ===
Under the conventional chronology, the Ahom dynasty spans nearly six centuries and includes 39 Swargadeos. Its dynastic genealogy identifies three major progenitor kings from whom the principal later branches of the royal house descended. These are Sukaphaa, who established the kingdom; Suhungmung, who made the greatest territorial and political expansion of the kingdom; and Supaatphaa, who established the House of Tungkhugia kings that reigned the kingdom during its political and cultural zenith, as well as the period of decay and end (except for Jogeswar Singha, who was a descendant of Supaatphaa's father Gobar, and who was installed as a puppet king by the Burmese).

Ahom kingdom

The dynastic history and dates that are accepted today are the result of a re-examination of Ahom and other documents by a team of Nora astronomers and experts who were commissioned to do so by Gaurinath Singha (1780–1795).

The list of Swargadeos of the Ahom kingdom
Years	Reign	Ahom name	Other names	Succession	End of reign	Capital
1228–1268	40y	Sukaphaa			natural death	Charaideo
1268–1281	13y	Suteuphaa		son of Sukaphaa	natural death	Charaideo
1281–1293	8y	Subinphaa		son of Suteuphaa	natural death	Charaideo
1293–1332	39y	Sukhaangphaa		son of Subinphaa	natural death	Charaideo
1332–1364	32y	Sukhrangpha		son of Sukhaangphaa	natural death	Charaideo
1364–1369	5y	Interregnum				
1369–1376	7y	Sutuphaa		brother of Sukhrangphaa	assassinated	Charaideo
1376–1380	4y	Interregnum				
1380–1389	9y	Tyao Khamti		brother of Sutuphaa	assassinated	Charaideo
1389–1397	8y	Interregnum				
1397–1407	10y	Sudangphaa	Baamuni Konwar	son of Tyao Khaamti	natural death	Charagua
1407–1422	15y	Sujangphaa		son of Sudangphaa	natural death	
1422–1439	17y	Suphakphaa		son of Sujangpha	natural death	
1439–1488	49y	Susenphaa		son of Suphakphaa	natural death	
1488–1493	5y	Suhenphaa		son of Susenphaa	assassinated	
1493–1497	4y	Supimphaa		son of Suhenphaa	natural death	
1497–1539	42y	Suhungmung	Swarganarayan, Dihingiaa Rojaa I	son of Supimphaa	assassinated	Bakata
1539–1552	13y	Suklenmung	Garhgayaan Rojaa	son of Suhungmung	natural death	Garhgaon
1552–1603	51y	Sukhaamphaa	Khuraa Rojaa	son of Suklenmung	natural death	Garhgaon
1603–1641	38y	Susenghphaa	Prataap Singha, Burhaa Rojaa, Buddhiswarganarayan	son of Sukhaamphaa	natural death	Garhgaon
1641–1644	3y	Suramphaa	Jayaditya Singha, Bhogaa Rojaa	son of Susenghphaa	deposed	Garhgaon
1644–1648	4y	Sutingphaa	Noriyaa Rojaa	brother of Suramphaa	deposed	Garhgaon
1648–1663	15y	Sutamla	Jayadhwaj Singha, Bhoganiyaa Rojaa	son of Sutingphaa	natural death	Garhgaon/Bakata
1663–1670	7y	Supangmung	Chakradhwaj Singha	cousin of Sutamla	natural death	Bakata/Garhgaon
1670–1672	2y	Sunyatphaa	Udayaditya Singha	brother of Supangmung	deposed	
1672–1674	2y	Suklamphaa	Ramadhwaj Singha	brother of Sunyatphaa	poisoned	
1674–1675	21d	Suhung	Samaguria Rojaa Khamjang	Samaguria descendant of Suhungmung	deposed	
1675–1675	24d		Gobar Roja	great-grandson of Suhungmung	deposed	
1675–1677	2y	Sujinphaa	Arjun Konwar, Dihingia Rojaa II	grandson of Pratap Singha, son of Namrupian Gohain	deposed, suicide	
1677–1679	2y	Sudoiphaa	Parvatia Rojaa	great-grandson of Suhungmung	deposed, killed	
1679–1681	3y	Sulikphaa	Ratnadhwaj Singha, Loraa Rojaa	Samaguria family	deposed, killed	
1681–1696	15y	Supaatphaa	Gadadhar Singha	son of Gobar Rojaa	natural death	Borkola
1696–1714	18y	Sukhrungphaa	Rudra Singha	son of Supaatphaa	natural death	Rangpur
1714–1744	30y	Sutanphaa	Siba Singha	son Sukhrungphaa	natural death	
1744–1751	7y	Sunenphaa	Pramatta Singha	brother of Sutanphaa	natural death	
1751–1769	18y	Suremphaa	Rajeswar Singha	brother of Sunenphaa	natural death	
1769–1780	11y	Sunyeophaa	Lakshmi Singha	brother of Suremphaa	natural death	
1780–1795	15y	Suhitpangphaa	Gaurinath Singha	son of Sunyeophaa	natural death	Jorhat
1795–1811	16y	Suklingphaa	Kamaleswar Singha	great-grandson of Lechai, the brother of Rudra Singha	natural death, smallpox	Jorhat
1811–1818	7y	Sudingphaa (1)	Chandrakaanta Singha	brother of Suklingphaa	deposed	Jorhat
1818–1819	1y		Purandar Singha (1)	descendant of Suremphaa	deposed	Jorhat
1819–1821	2y	Sudingphaa (2)	Chandrakaanta Singha		fled the capital	
1821–1822	1y		Jogeswar Singha	5th descendant of Jambor, the brother of Gadadhar Singha. Jogeswar was brother of Hemo Aideo, and was puppet of Burmese ruler	removed	
1833–1838			Purandar Singha (2)			

=== Kachari (Dimasa) dynasty (1250 – 1832 CE) ===
The Kings of Kachar
Capital	King	Date of Accession	Reign in Progress	End of reign
Dimapur	La-wang-pa		1406	
Dimapur	Manipha			
Dimapur	Ladapha			
Dimapur	Viravijay Narayana (or Khorapha)		1520?	1526
Dimapur	Khuntara	1526		1531
Dimapur	Detsung/Dersung	1531		1536
	Interregnum?			
Maibong	Nirbhay Narayan	1558?	1559	
Maibong	Durlabh Narayan			
Maibong	Megha Narayan	1568	1578	1583?
Maibong	Yasho Narayan (Satrudaman)	1583?		1601
Maibong	Indrapratap Narayan	1601	1610	
Maibong	Nar Narayan			
Maibong	Bhimdarpa Narayan		1618?	
Maibong	Indraballabh Narayan	1628		1644?
Maibong	Birdarpa Narayan	1644?		1681
Maibong	Garurdhwaj Narayan(Thaosen Clan)	1681		1695
Maibong	Makardhwaj Narayan( Thaosen Clan)	1695		
Maibong	Udayaditya(Thaosen Clan)			
Maibong	Tamradhwaj Narayan( Thaosen Clan/Sengphong)		1706	1708
Maibong	Suradarpa Narayan ( Thaosen clan/Sengphong)	1708		
Maibong	Harischandra Narayan -1 (Thaosen Sengphong)		1721	
Maibong	Kirtichandra Narayan( Hasnusa Sengphong)		1736	
Maibong	Sandikhari Narayan alias Ram Chandra)		1736	
Khaspur	Harischandra-2 (Hasnusa Sengphong)		1771	
Khaspur	Lakshmichandra Narayan	1772		
Khaspur	Krishnachandra Narayan		1790	1813
Khaspur	Govindachandra Narayan	1814		1819
Khaspur	Chaurajit Singh (from Manipur)	1819		1823
Khaspur	Gambhir Singh (from Manipur)	1823		1824
Khaspur	Govindachandra Narayan	1824		1830
	British Annexation	1832		

=== Kamata dynasty (1228/1257 – 1365 CE) ===
- Sandhya
- Sindhu Rai
- Rup Narayan
- Singhadhwaj
- Pratapdhvaj
- Dharma Narayan
- Durlabh Narayan
- Indra Narayan

=== Chutia dynasty (unknown – 1523 CE) ===
Known rulers of the Chutia kingdom are:

- Birpal (late 12th century)
- Gaurinarayana or Ratnadhwajpal (early 13th century)
- Nandisvara (late 14th century)
- Satyanarayana (late 14th century)
- Lakshminarayana (early 15th century)
- Dharmanarayana (early 15th century)
- Durlabhnarayana (early 15th century)
- Muktadharmanarayana (mid 15th century)
- Pratyakshanarayana (mid 15th century)
- Yasanarayana (mid 15th century)
- Purandarnarayana (late 15th century)
- Dhirnarayana (unknown – 1524)
- Sati Sadhani (unknown)

=== Khen dynasty (1440 – 1498 CE) ===
- Niladhwaj
- Chakradhwaj
- Nilambar

=== Koch dynasty (1515 – 1949 CE) ===
==== Rulers of undivided Koch kingdom (1515 – 1586) ====
- Biswa Singha (1515–1540)
- Nara Narayan (1540–1586)

==== Rulers of Koch Bihar (1586 – 1949) ====
- Lakshmi Narayan
- Bir Narayan
- Pran Narayan
- Basudev Narayan
- Mahindra Narayan
- Roop Narayan
- Upendra Narayan
- Devendra Narayan
- Dhairjendra Narayan
- Rajendra Narayan
- Dharendra Narayan
- Harendra Narayan
- Shivendra Narayan
- Narendra Narayan
- Nripendra Narayan
- Rajendra Narayan II
- Jitendra Narayan (father of Gayatri Devi)
- Jagaddipendra Narayan (ruled till 1949)

==== Rulers of Koch Hajo (1581 – 1616 CE) ====
- Raghudev (son of Chilarai, nephew of Nara Narayan)
- Parikshit Narayan

==== Rulers of Darrang ====
- Balinarayan (brother of Parikshit Narayan)
- Mahendra Narayan
- Chandra Narayan
- Surya Narayan

==== Rulers of Beltola ====
- Gaj Narayan Dev (brother of Parikshit Narayan, ruler of Koch Hajo, brother of Balinarayan, first Koch ruler of Darrang).
- Shivendra Narayan Dev (son of Gaj Narayan)
- Gandharva Narayan Dev (son of Shivendra Narayan)
- Uttam Narayan Dev (son of Gandharva Narayan Dev)
- Dhwaja Narayan Dev (son of Uttam Narayan Dev)
- Jay Narayan Dev (son of Dhwaja Narayan Dev)
- Lambodar Narayan Dev (son of Jay Narayan Dev)
- Lokpal Narayan Dev (son of Lambodar Narayan Dev)
- Amrit Narayan Dev (son of Lokpal Narayan Dev)
- Chandra Narayan Dev (son of Lokpal Narayan Dev) (died 1910 CE)
- Rajendra Narayan Dev (son of Chandra Narayan Dev) (died 1937 CE)
- Lakshmipriya Devi (wife of Rajendra Narayan Dev) (reign:1937–1947 CE died: 1991 CE)

==== Rulers of Bijni ====
The Bijni rulers reigned between the Sankosh and the Manas rivers, the region immediately to the east of Koch Bihar.

- Chandra Narayan (son of Parikshit Narayan)
- Joy Narayan
- Shiv Narayan
- Bijoy Narayan
- Mukunda Narayan
- Haridev Narayan
- Balit Narayan
- Indra Narayan
- Amrit Narayan
- Kumud Narayan
- Jogendra Narayan
- Bhairabendra Narayan

==== Rulers of Khaspur ====
The independent rule of the Khaspur rulers ended in 1745 when it merged with the Kachari kingdom.

The rulers of the Koch kingdom at Khaspur are:

- Kamal Narayan (Gohain Kamal, son of Biswa Singha, governor of Khaspur)
- Udita Narayan (declared independence of Khaspur in 1590)
- Vijay Narayana
- Dhir Narayana
- Mahendra Narayana
- Ranjit
- Nara Singha
- Bhim Singha (his only issue, daughter Kanchani, married a prince of Kachari kingdom, and Khaspur merged with the Kachari kingdom)

== Modern period (c. 1800 – 1947 CE) ==
=== British colonial Assam (1826 – 1947 CE) ===
Chronology of British colonial reign on Assam:

1. Bengal Presidency (1826–1873 CE)
2. Chief Commissioner's Province (1874–1905 CE)
3. Eastern Bengal and Assam under Lt. Governor (1906–1912 CE)
4. Assam Legislative Council (1912–1920 CE)
5. Dyarchy (1921 – 1937 CE)
6. Assam Legislative Assembly (1937–1947 CE)

== Republic of India ==
List of governors of Assam

List of chief ministers of Assam

== See also ==
- History of Assam

== Sources ==
- Baruah, S L (1986), A Comprehensive History of Assam, Munshiram Manoharlal
- Baruah, S. L. (1993), Last Days of Ahom Monarchy, New Delhi
- Bhattacharjee, J.B. (1994), "The Pre-Colonial Political Structure of Barak Valley", in Milton S. Sangma (ed.), Essays on North-east India: Presented in Memory of Professor V. Venkata Rao, New Delhi: Indus Publishing, ISBN 978-81-7387-015-6
- Gait, Edward A (1906), A History of Assam, Calcutta
- Gogoi, Padmeshwar (1968), The Tai and the Tai kingdoms, Guwahati: Gauhati University
- Rhodes, N G (1986). "The Coinage of Kachar". The Numismatic Chronicle. 146: 155–177. ISSN 0078-2696. JSTOR 42667461.
- Sharma, Mukunda Madhava (1978), Inscriptions of Ancient Assam, Gauhati University, Assam
- Shin, Jae-Eun (2018), "Region Formed and Imagined: Reconsidering temporal, spatial and social context of Kamarupa", in Dzüvichü, Lipokmar; Baruah, Manjeet (eds.), Modern Practices in North East India: History, Culture, Representation, London & New York: Routledge, pp. 23–55
- Shin, Jae-Eun (2020). "Descending from demons, ascending to kshatriyas: Genealogical claims and political process in pre-modern Northeast India, The Chutiyas and the Dimasas". The Indian Economic and Social History Review. 57 (1): 49–75. doi:10.1177/0019464619894134. S2CID 213213265.
- Urban, Hugh (2009), The Power of Tantra: Religion, Sexuality and the Politics of South Asian Studies, Bloomsbury, ISBN 9780857715869
