= Varman (surname) =

Family name

Origin
- Region of origin: India

Varman or its variants, Varma, Verma, Burman or Barman, are surnames that are used in India and southeast Asia.

== Etymology ==
According to Radhakanta Deb, the surname is derived from the Sanskrit word for "shield, defensive armour".

== Notable individuals ==
- R. Verman (1947–2019), Indian art director
- Ravi Varman, Indian cinematographer, film director, and producer
- Sankara Varman, Indian astronomer-mathematician
- Kritavarma, also called Kritavarman or Kŗtavarmā, Mahabharata character

=== Rulers ===
==== India ====
- Arulmozhi Varman, Chola Emperor also known as Raja Raja Chola I who ruled over medieval Tamil Nadu
- Pallava dynasty kings of southern India:
  - Simhavarman II
  - Simhavarman III
  - Mahendravarman I
  - Narasimhavarman I
  - Mahendravarman II
  - Paramesvaravarman I
  - Narasimhavarman II
  - Paramesvaravarman II
  - Nandivarman II
  - Dantivarman
  - Nandivarman III
  - Aparajitavarman
- Varman dynasty kings of eastern India:
  - Pushyavarman, r.c. 350–374
  - Samudravarman, r.c. 374–398
  - Balavarman, r.c. 398–422
  - Kalyanavarman, r.c. 422–446
  - Ganapativarman, r.c. 446–470
  - Mahendravarman, r.c. 470–494
  - Narayanavarman, r.c. 494–518
  - Bhutivarman, r.c. 518–542
  - Chandramukhavarman, r.c. 542–566
  - Sthitavarman, r.c. 566–590
  - Susthitavarman, r.c. 590–595
  - Supratisthitavarman, r.c. 595–600
  - Bhaskaravarman, r.c. 600–650
  - Avantivarman, r.c. 650–655
- Chera dynasty of southern India
  - Kulashekhara Varman, founder of the second Chera empire in India
  - Rajashekhara Varman, Chera ruler and saint of southern India
- Maipady Venkatesh Varma Raja : Raja of Kumbla
- Ravivarma Narasimha Domba Heggade :Raja of Vitla
- Kerala Varmans, a dynasty of Kerala, India

==== Outside India ====
- Mulavarman, king of Kutai Martadipura (present Indonesia)
- Purnawarman, king of Tarumanagara (present Indonesia)
- Adityawarman, king of Malayapura (present Indonesia)
- Samara Vijayatunggavarman, king of Srivijaya (present Indonesia, Singapore, and Malaysia)
- Suryavarman I, king of Khmer Empire (present Cambodia)
