= Barman (surname) =

Surname in the Indian subcontinent

- Pronunciation: ber-muh n

Origin
- Origin: (Sanskrit: वर्मा)
- Meaning: Armour
- Region of origin: India

Other names
- Variant forms: Verma, Varma, Varman, Burman

Barman or its variants Burman (Bengali: বর্মন, Hindi: बर्मन, Pali: बामण), Varman (Sanskrit: वर्मन्), (Punjabi ਬਰਮਨ), Varma, Verma (Kannada: ವರ್ಮ, Malayalam: വര്‍മ, Tamil: வர்மன், Telugu: వర్మ), are surnames used in the Indian subcontinent.

In Sanskrit language, Varma (Sanskrit: वर्मा) is the masculine form of the word for "Armour".

== Indian traditional usage ==
Barman was the surname used by members of the Cochin, Travancore, Tripura and other royal families.. The surname was also used by Vajravarman a scribe from the family of Siddha Kabiraj of Varma kalai mentioned in the Talamanchi grant of Vikramāditya I of Bādāmi (660 A.D.).

== Geographical distribution ==
As of 2014, 96.3% of all known bearers of the surname Barman were residents of India and 3.4% were residents of Bangladesh. In India, the frequency of the surname was higher than national average in the following states:

1. West Bengal (1: 45)
2. Assam (1: 71)
3. Tripura (1: 285)

== Notable people ==
Notable people with the surname include:

- Sridharavarman (c. 339 – c. 368 CE) Saka ruler of Central India
- Chandravarman (4th century CE) was a king of the Pushkarana kingdom in the Bankura district of West Bengal extended eastward to the Faridpur district of Bangladesh
- Mulavarman, was the king of the Kutai Martadipura Kingdom located in eastern Borneo around the year 400 CE, Indonesia and Malaysia
- Srutavarman (435 - 495 AD) was the first king of Chenla.
- Bhadravarman I, 5th century King of Champa, Vietnam
- Purnavarman is the 5th century king of Tarumanagara, Indonesia
- Iśanavarman (c. 550-560 CE), Maukhari king of the Kingdom of Kannauj, (northern India)
- Bhaskaravarman (7th century CE) was a king of Varman dynasty, Kamarupa, India
- Yashovarman (c. 725 – 752), king of Kannauj in the western Ganges plain (northern India)
- Avantivarman (855-883 CE), founder of Utpala dynasty, Kashmir (northern Indian)
- Adityawarman (1347–1375), king of Mauli dynasty based on central Sumatra, Indonesia
- Adwaita Mallabarman (1914), Indian writer
- Basudeb Barman (born 1935), Communist Party of India politician
- Hiten Barman (born 1950), All India Forward Bloc politician
- Kirit Pradyot Deb Barman (born 1977), Hindu monarch, Tripura, North-eastern India
- Ranen Barman (born 1969), Revolutionary Socialist Party politician
- Uddabh Barman (21st century), Indian communist politician
- R. D. Burman (19th century), Indian music director
- S. D. Burman Bollywood music director and playback singer of Indian music (1932–1975)
- Swapna Barman Indian athletic gold medalist (W.B)
- Somdev Devvarman Indian tennis player (A.S)
- Anand Burman chairman of Dabur (W.B)
- Upendranath Barman Indian politician
- Kirit Bikram Kishore Deb Barman last King of Tripura, a princely state in northeastern India

=== Other notable people elsewhere ===
- Christian Barman (1898–1980), Belgian-born British industrial designer
- Jean Barman, American-born historian of British Columbia
- MC Paul Barman (born 1974), American rapper
- Ole Barman (1897–1983), Norwegian jurist, novelist etc.
- Tom Barman (born 1972), Belgian musician and film director
- Travis Barman, American astronomer
- Anandamay Barman, Member of the West Bengal Legislative Assembly

== See also ==
- Varman (surname)
