= Ashvamedha =

Horse sacrifice ritual practiced in the Śrauta tradition of Vedic religion

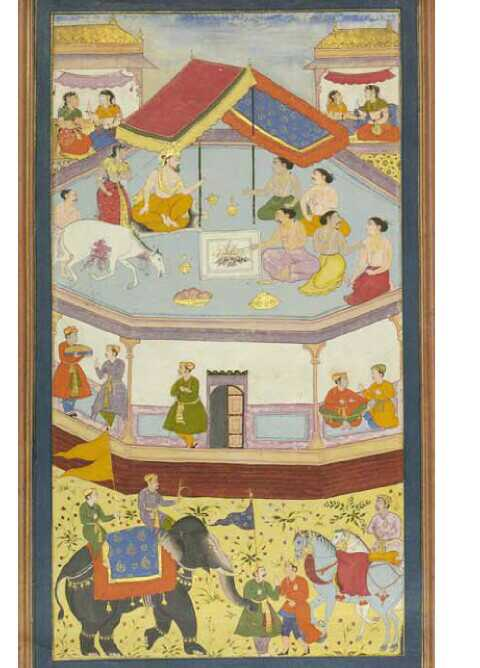
Ashvamedha yajna of Yudhisthira

The Ashvamedha (Sanskrit: अश्वमेध, romanized: aśvamedha) was a horse sacrifice ritual practiced in the Śrauta tradition of Vedic religion. It was used by ancient Indian kings to prove their imperial sovereignty: a horse accompanied by the king's warriors would be released to wander for a year. In the territories traversed by the horse, any rival could dispute the king's authority by challenging the warriors accompanying it. After one year, if no enemy had managed to kill or capture the horse, the animal would be guided back to the king's capital. It would then be sacrificed, and the king would be declared as an undisputed sovereign.

The ritual is recorded as being held by many ancient rulers, but apparently only twice in the last thousand years. The most recent ritual was in 1741, the second one held by Maharajah Jai Singh II of Jaipur.

The original Vedic religion had evidently included many animal sacrifices, as had the various folk religions of India. Brahminical Hinduism had evolved opposing animal sacrifices, which have not been the norm in most forms of Hinduism for many centuries. The great prestige and political role of the Ashvamedha perhaps kept it alive for longer.

== The sacrifice ==
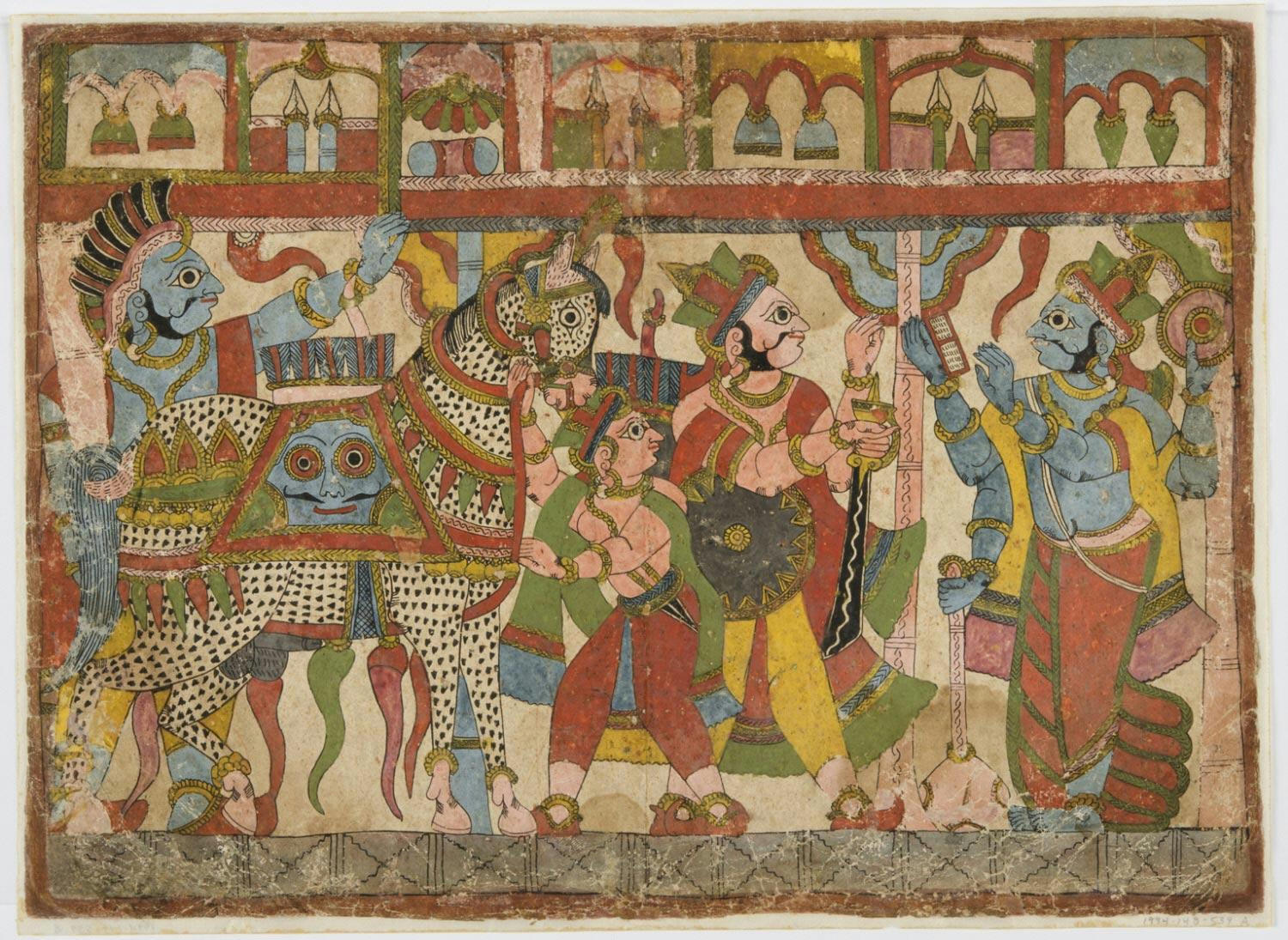
A 19th-century painting, depicting the preparation of an army to follow the sacrificial horse. Probably from an illustration to Lakshmisa's Jaimini Bharata.

The Ashvamedha could only be conducted by a powerful victorious king (rājā). Its object was the acquisition of power and glory, the sovereignty over neighbouring provinces, seeking progeny and general prosperity of the kingdom. It was enormously expensive, requiring the participation of hundreds of individuals, many with specialized skills, and hundreds of animals, and involving many precisely prescribed rituals at every stage.

The horse to be sacrificed must be a white stallion with black spots. The preparations included the construction of a special "sacrificial house" and a fire altar. Before the horse began its travels, at a moment chosen by astrologers, there was a ceremony and small sacrifice in the house, after which the king had to spend the night with the queen, but avoiding sex.

The next day the horse was consecrated with more rituals, tethered to a post, and addressed as a god. It was sprinkled with water, and the Adhvaryu, the priest and the sacrificer whispered mantras into its ear. A "four-eyed" black dog was killed with a club made of Sidhraka wood, then passed under the horse, and dragged to the river from which the water sprinkled on the horse had come and set to flow south. The horse was then set loose towards the north-east, to roam around wherever it chose, for the period of one year, or half a year, according to some commentators. The horse was associated with the Sun, and its yearly course. If the horse wandered into neighbouring provinces hostile to the sacrificer, they were to be subjugated. The wandering horse was attended by a herd of a hundred geldings, and one or four hundred young kshatriya men, sons of princes or high court officials, charged with guarding the horse from all dangers and inconvenience, but never impeding or driving it.

The escort had to prevent the stallion from mating with any mares during its journey, and if he did, an oblation of milk was performed to Vāyu. If the horse became ill with injury, an oblation of pap to Pūṣan. If he became ill without injury, then an oblation of cake to Agni Vaiśvānara. If he was afflicted with eye disease, an oblation to Sūrya. If the horse drowned, an oblation was performed to Varuṇa. If the horse was lost, an oblation of cake, potsherd, and three other dishes to the deities of heaven and earth, along with an oblation of milk to Vāyu and pap to Sūrya. If the horse died, then another was selected and consecrated to replace it. During the absence of the horse, an uninterrupted series of ceremonies was performed in the sacrificer's home. Every day, three Sāvitreṣṭi rites and one evening Dhṛtihoma would be conducted by the priests. In the evening after the Dhṛtihoma, two Brahmin and two Kshatriya bards and lutists would praise the patron king's generosity, who gave 4,000 cows and 400 gold coins to the priests on the first day of the sacrifice. Then a session of pariplavākhyāna took place. The pariplāvana was the cyclical recitation of tales, in which one out of ten topics would be discussed each night, with 36 cycles of the ten topics. The tales were witnessed by an audience of onlookers called the upadrāṣṭṛ, who attended in their free time.

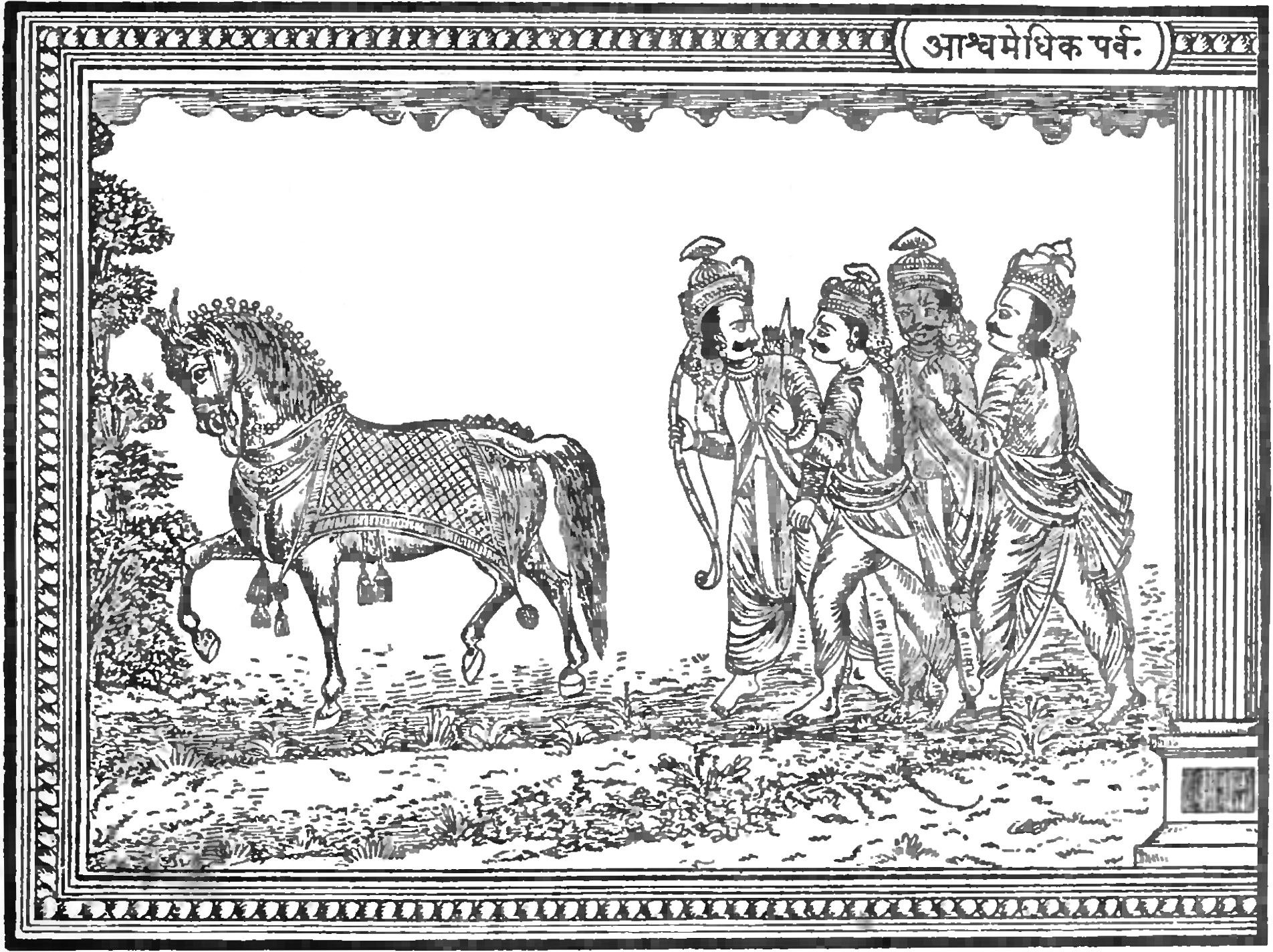
Depiction of the Asvamedha in History of India (1906)

After the return of the horse, more ceremonies were performed for a month before the main sacrifice. Twelve days of dīkṣā rites took place, and then twelve days of upasad. The dīkṣā rite was a preparatory consecration rite performed before sacrifices. It consisted of a preliminary oblation, and then the king would bathe, dress in black antelope skin, and sit on another skin in a hut in front of a fire, fasting in silence with a covered head and sleeping on the ground. The upasad was a multiday ceremony that precedes Soma sacrifices. It consisted of the acquisition and welcoming of Soma and the construction of various structures needed for the sacrifice, along with the sacrifice of a goat.

On the twenty-fifth day, the agniṣṭoma was performed. The agniṣṭoma was the main part of the Soma sacrifice. In the morning pressing, the soma was pressed out and offered along with "rice cakes, parched barley, flour in sour milk, parched rice, and a hot mixture of milk and sour milk". During the pressings and oblations, five musical chants were sung and five recitations were chanted. The priests then partook in the drinking of the soma and the twelve oblations to the seasons, and the sacrifice of a goat to Agni. The midday pressing was similar and dedicated to Indra, and dakshina was also distributed on that day to the priests consisting of a varying multitude of cows. At the evening pressing only two musical chants were sung and two recitations chanted. Then proceeded the conclusory libations to the "yoking of the bay horses" and the sun, followed by the Avabhṛtha. The Avabhṛtha was the "unpurificatory" bathing of the sacrificer at the end of the sacrifice. After an antelope skin was put in the water body, the king, his wife, and the priests ritually bathe. Afterwards a sterile cow or eleven other animals are sacrificed. Throughout the entire night, the annahoma was performed at the Uttaravedi (the northern altar). It consists of an oblation of clarified butter, fried rice, fried barley, and fried grain.

On the twenty-sixth day, the king was ritually purified, and the horse was yoked to a gilded chariot, together with three other horses, and Rigveda (RV) 1.6.1,2 (YajurVeda (YV) VSM 23.5,6) was recited. The horse was then driven into water and bathed. After this, it was anointed with ghee by the chief queen and two other royal consorts. The chief queen (mahiṣī) anointed the fore-quarters, the favorite wife (vāvātā) the middle, and the discarded wife (parvṛktī) the hindquarters. They also embellished the horse's head, neck, and tail with golden ornaments and 101 or 109 pearls. After this, the horse, a hornless black-necked he-goat, and a Gomṛga were bound to sacrificial stakes near the fire, and seventeen other animals were attached with ropes to the horse. The he-goat dedicated to Agni was attached to the horse's chest. A ewe dedicated to Sarasvatī was attached under the horse's mouth. Two black-bellied he-goats dedicated to the Aśvins were tied to the horse's front legs. A dark grey he-goat dedicated to Soma-Pūṣan was attached underneath the horse. On the two sides of the horse were attached a black goat to Sūrya and a white goat to Yama. Two goats with shaggy thighs were dedicated to Tvaṣṭar. A white goat dedicated to Vāyu was attached to the tail. A cow about to give birth was dedicated to Indra, and a dwarfish cow was dedicated to Viṣṇu. A great number of animals, both tame and wild, were tied to other stakes, according to one commentator, 609 in total. The sacrificer offered the horse the remains of the night's oblation of grain. The horse was then suffocated to death. The chief queen ritually called on the king's fellow wives for pity. The queens walked around the dead horse reciting mantras and obscene dialogue with the priests. The chief queen then had to spend the night beside the dead horse in a position mimicking sexual intercourse and was covered with a blanket.

On the next morning, the priests raised the queen from the place. One priest cut the horse along the "knife-paths" while other priests started reciting the verses of Vedas, seeking healing and regeneration for the horse. The horse's epiploon along with soma are offered in an oblation, and the priests dismember the horse and other animal victims with an oblation of their blood. On the third day an Atirātra was performed. The Atirātra was a Soma sacrifice in which there was a nocturnal session where soma was drunk. Afterwards an Avabhṛtha takes place. However, in the Ashvamedha sinners and criminals also take part in the purificatory bathing. Afterwards twenty-one sterile cows are sacrificed, and the dakshina was distributed to the priests. The main dakshina forms either the four wives of the king or their four hundred attendants.

The Laws of Manu refer to the Ashvamedha (V.53): "The man who offers a horse-sacrifice every day for a hundred years, and the man who does not eat meat, the two of them reap the same fruit of good deeds."

== Mentions in Hindu epics ==
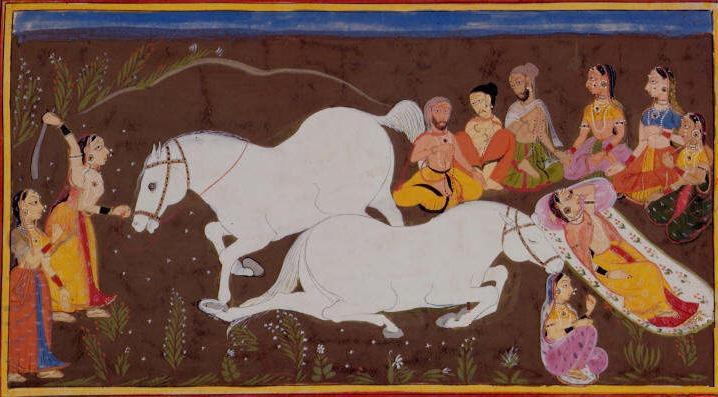
Queen Kaushalya performing the Ashvamedha ritual; illustration to the Ramayana

=== Mahabharata ===
The best-known text describing the sacrifice is the Ashvamedhika Parva (Sanskrit: अश्वमेध पर्व), or the "Book of Horse Sacrifice," the fourteenth of eighteen books of the Indian epic poem Mahabharata. Krishna and Vyasa advise King Yudhishthira to perform the sacrifice, which is described at great length. The book traditionally comprises two sections and 96 chapters. The critical edition has one sub-book and 92 chapters.

=== Ramayana ===
Balakanda, the first book of the Ramayana by Valmiki, mentions a horse sacrifice performed at the behest of King Dasharatha, the father of Rama.

== On Gupta coins ==
One type of the gold coins of the Gupta Empire kings Samudragupta (reigned c. 350–370 CE) and Kumaragupta (reigned c. 415–455 CE) commemorates their Ashvamedha sacrifices. The obverse shows the horse anointed and decorated for sacrifice, standing in front of a Yūpa sacrificial post, and is inscribed "The king of kings who has performed the Vajimedha sacrifice wins heaven after protecting the earth". The reverse shows a standing figure of the queen, holding a fan and a towel, and is inscribed "Powerful enough to perform the Ashvamedha sacrifice".

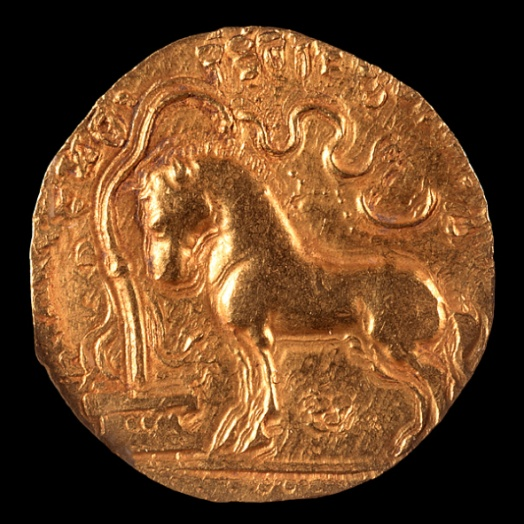
Samudragupta, Ashvamedha horse

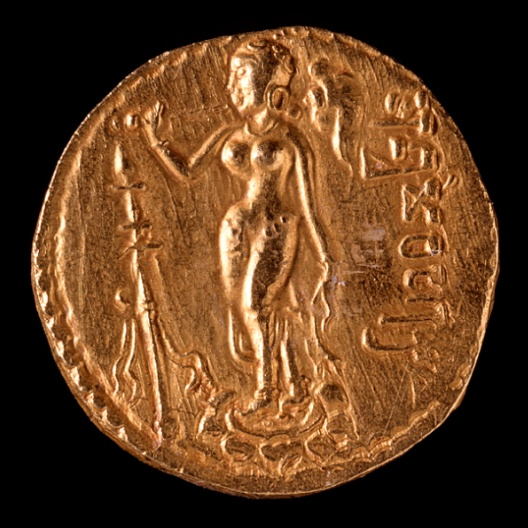
The queen, reverse of last

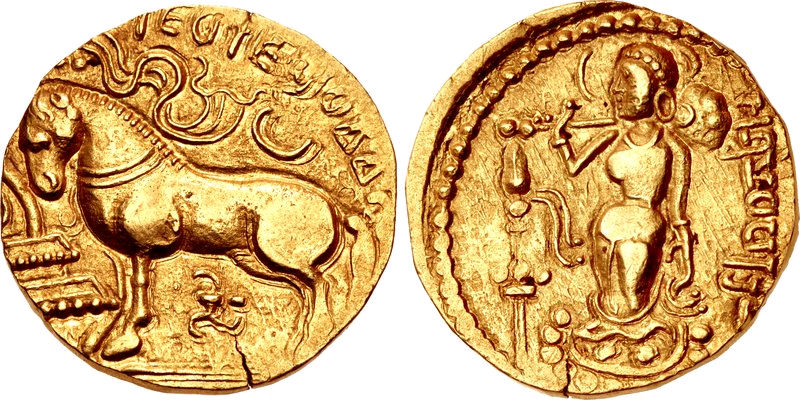
Samudragupta

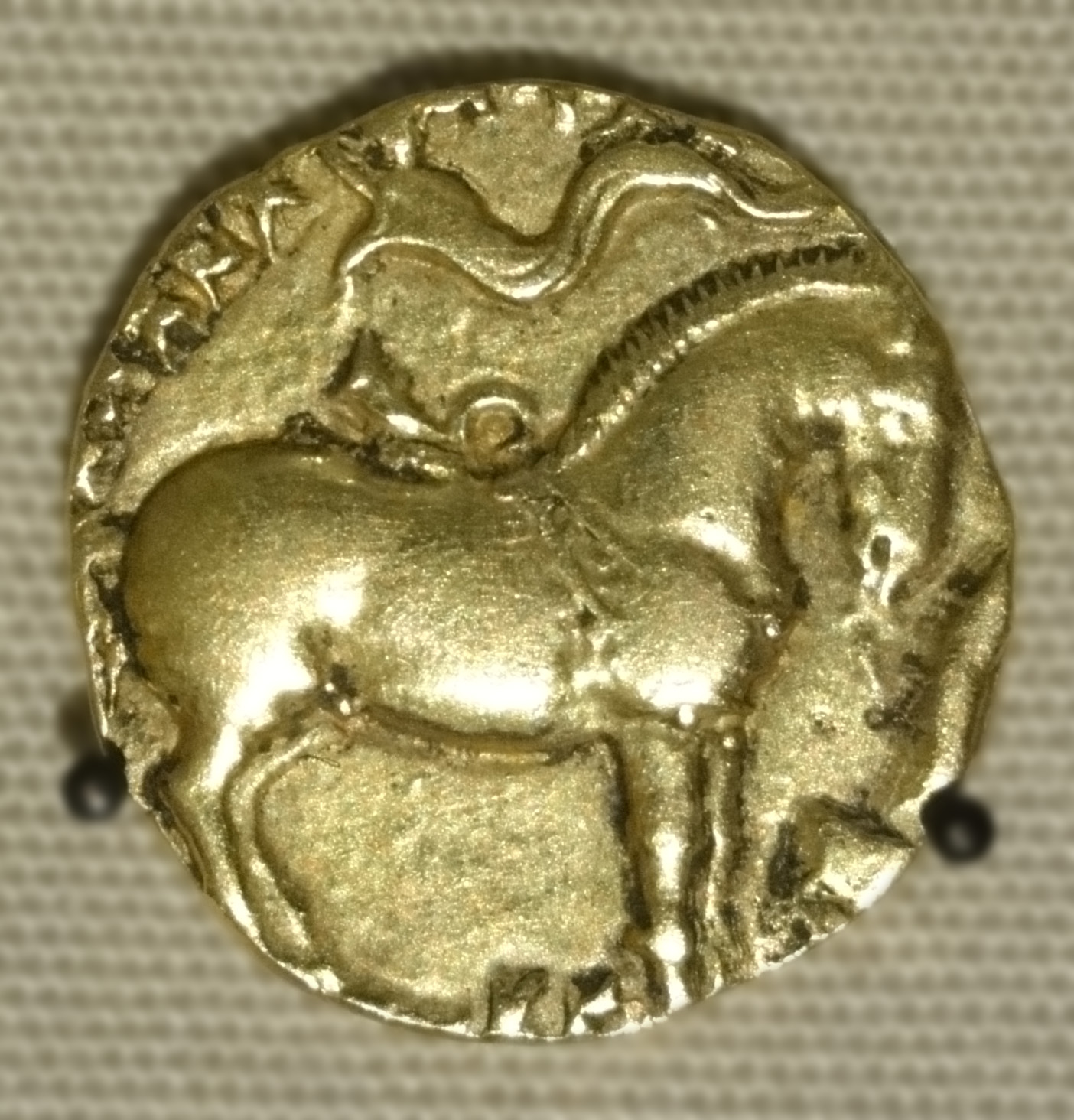
Kumaragupta

== Similar sacrifices elsewhere ==
Many Indo-European branches show evidence for horse sacrifice, and comparative mythology suggests that they derive from a Proto-Indo-European ritual. Most appear to be funerary practices associated with burial, but for some other cultures there is tentative evidence for rituals associated with kingship. The Ashvamedha is the clearest evidence preserved, but vestiges from Latin and Celtic traditions allow the reconstruction of a few common attributes.

A similar ritual is found in Celtic tradition in which the king in Ireland conducted a rite of symbolic marriage with a sacrificed horse. The Roman October Horse sacrifice was an annual event, and apparently the only time horses were sacrificed, rather than cattle or smaller animals.

Horse sacrifices were performed among the ancient Germans, Armenians, Iranians, Chinese, Greeks, among others.

== List of performers ==
Sanskrit epics and Puranas mention numerous legendary performances of the horse sacrifice. For example, according to the Mahabharata, Emperor Bharata performed a hundred Ashvamedha ceremonies on the banks of Yamuna, three hundred on the banks of Sarasvati and four hundred on the banks of the Ganga. He again performed a thousand Ashvamedha on different locations and a hundred Rajasuya. Following the vast empires ruled by the Gupta and Chalukya dynasties, the practice of the sacrifice diminished remarkably.

The historical performers of Ashvamedha include:

| Monarch | Reign | Dynasty | Source |
|---|---|---|---|
| Purukutsa | Early Vedic Period | Puru | |
| Trasadasyu Paurukutsya | Early Vedic Period | Puru | |
| Sudās Paijavana | Early Vedic Period | Bharata | |
| Parīkṣit | Later Vedic Period | Kuru | |
| Janamejaya Pārikṣita | Later Vedic Period | Kuru | |
| Pushyamitra Shunga | 185–149 BCE | Shunga | Ayodhya inscription of Dhanadeva and Malavikagnimitra of Kalidasa |
| Sarvatata | 1st century BCE | Gajayana | Ghosundi and Hathibada inscriptions. Some scholars believe Sarvatata to be a Kanva king, but there is no definitive evidence for this. |
| Devimitra | 1st century BCE | Unknown | Musanagar inscription |
| Satakarni I | 1st or 2nd century CE | Satavahana | Nanaghat inscription mentions his second Ashvamedha |
| Vasishthiputra Chamtamula | 3rd century CE | Andhra Ikshvaku | Records of his son and grandson |
| Shilavarman | 3rd century CE | Varshaganya | Jagatpur inscriptions mention his fourth Ashvamedha |
| Pravarasena I | c. 270 – c. 330 CE | Vakataka | Inscriptions of his descendants state that he performed four Ashvamedha sacrifices |
| Bhavanaga | 305–320 CE | Nagas of Padmavati | The inscriptions of Vakataka relatives of the Nagas credit them with 10 horse-sacrifices, although they do not name these kings. |
| Vijaya-devavarman | 300–350 CE | Shalankayana | Ellore inscription |
| Shivaskanda Varman | 4th century CE | Pallava | Hirahadagalli inscription |
| Kumaravishnu | 4th century CE | Pallava | Omgodu inscription of his great-grandson |
| Mulawarman | 4th century CE | Kutai Martadipura (present Indonesia) | |
| Samudragupta | c. 335/350–375 CE | Gupta | Coins of the king and records of his descendants |
| Kumaragupta I | 414 – 455 CE | Gupta | |
| Madhava Varman | 440–460 CE | Vishnukundina | |
| Dharasena | 5th century CE | Traikutaka | |
| Krishnavarman | 5th century CE | Kadamba | |
| Narayanavarman | 494–518 CE | Varman | Legend of Bhaskaravarman's seals |
| Bhutivarman | 518–542 CE | Varman | Barganga inscription |
| Pulakeshin I | 543–566 CE | Chalukyas of Vatapi | |
| Sthitavarman | 565–585 CE | Varman | |
| Pulakeshin II | 610–642 CE | Chalukyas of Vatapi | |
| Madhavaraja II (alias Madhavavarman or Sainyabhita) | c. 620–670 CE | Shailodbhava | Inscriptions |
| Simhavarman (possibly Narasimhavarman I) | 630–668 CE | Pallava | The Sivanvayal pillar inscription states that he performed ten Ashvamedhas |
| Adityasena | 655–680 CE | Later Gupta | Vaidyanatha temple (Deoghar) inscription |
| Madhyamaraja I (alias Ayashobhita II) | c. 670–700 CE | Shailodbhava | Inscriptions; one interpretation of the inscriptions suggests that he merely participated in the Ashvamedha performed by his father Madhavaraja II |
| Dharmaraja (alias Manabhita) | c. 726–727 CE | Shailodbhava | Inscriptions; one interpretation of the inscriptions suggests that he merely participated in the Ashvamedha performed by his grandfather Madhavaraja II |
| Rajadhiraja Chola | 1044–1052 CE | Chola | |
| Jai Singh II | 1734 and 1741 CE | Kachwahas of Jaipur | Ishvaravilasa Kavya by Krishna-bhatta, a participant in Jai Singh's Ashvamedha ceremony and a court poet of his son Ishvar Singh |

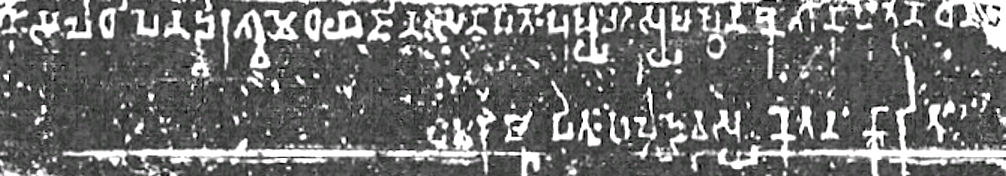
The Dhanadeva-Ayodhya inscription, 1st century BCE, mentions two Ashvamedha rituals by Pushyamitra in the city of Ayodhya.

The Udayendiram inscription of the 8th-century Pallava king Nandivarman II (alias Pallavamalla) states that his general Udayachandra defeated the Nishada ruler Prithvivyaghra, who, "desiring to become very powerful, was running after the horse of the Ashvamedha". The inscription does not clarify which king initiated this Ashvamedha campaign. Historian N. Venkataramanayya theorized that Prithvivyaghra was a feudatory ruler, who unsuccessfully tried to challenge Nandivarman's Ashvamedha campaign. However, historian Dineshchandra Sircar notes that no other inscriptions of Nandivarman or his descendants mention his performance of Ashvamedha; therefore, it is more likely that the Ashvamedha campaign was initiated by Prithvivyaghra (or his overlord), and Nandivarman's general foiled it.

== In Hindu revivalism ==
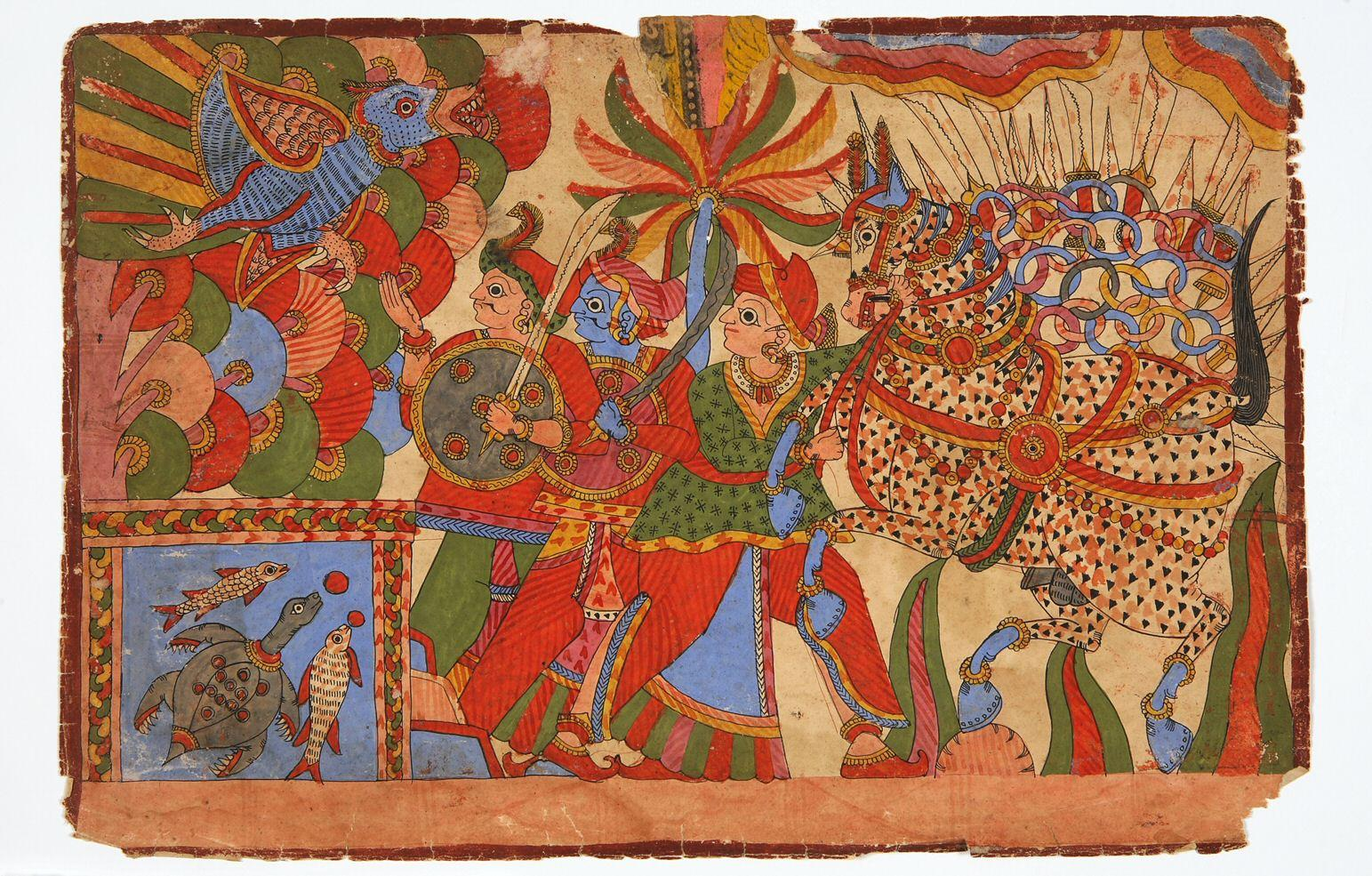
The horse Shyamakarna on the bank of Lake Dudumbhi, illustrating Jaimini's commentary on Ashvamedha, 19th century, Maharashtra

In the Arya Samaj reform movement of Dayananda Sarasvati, the Ashvamedha is considered an allegory or a ritual to get connected to the "Inner Sun" (Prana) According to Dayananda, no horse was actually to be slaughtered in the ritual as per the Yajurveda. Following Dayananda, the Arya Samaj disputes the very existence of the pre-Vedantic ritual; thus Swami Satya Prakash Saraswati claims that

the word in the sense of the Horse Sacrifice does not occur in the Samhitas [...] In the terms of cosmic analogy, ashva s the Sun. In respect to the adhyatma paksha, the Prajapati-Agni, or the Purusha, the Creator, is the Ashva; He is the same as the Varuna, the Most Supreme. The word medha stands for homage; it later on became synonymous with oblations in rituology, since oblations are offered, dedicated to the one whom we pay homage. The word deteriorated further when it came to mean 'slaughter' or 'sacrifice'.

He argues that the animals listed as sacrificial victims are just as symbolic as the list of human victims listed in the Purushamedha (which is generally accepted as a purely symbolic sacrifice already in Rigvedic times).

Gayatri Pariwar since 1991 has organized performances of a "modern version" of the Ashvamedha where a statue is used in place of a real horse, according to Hinduism Today with a million participants in Chitrakoot, Madhya Pradesh on April 16 to 20, 1994. Such modern performances are Sattvika Yajnas where the animal is worshipped without killing it, the religious motivation being prayer for overcoming enemies, the facilitation of child welfare and development, and clearance of debt, entirely within the allegorical interpretation of the ritual, and with no actual sacrifice of any animal.

== Reception ==
The earliest recorded criticism of the ritual comes from the Cārvāka, an atheistic school of Indian philosophy that assumed various forms of philosophical skepticism and religious indifference. A quotation of the Cārvāka from Madhavacharya's Sarva-Darsana-Sangraha states: "The three authors of the Vedas were buffoons, knaves, and demons. All the well-known formulae of the pandits, jarphari, turphari, etc. and all the obscene rites for the queen commanded in Ashvamedha, these were invented by buffoons, and so all the various kinds of presents to the priests, while the eating of flesh was similarly commanded by night-prowling demons."

According to some writers, ashvamedha is a forbidden rite for Kali Yuga, the current age.

This part of the ritual offended the Dalit reformer and framer of the Indian constitution B. R. Ambedkar and is frequently mentioned in his writings as an example of the perceived degradation of Brahmanical culture.

Scholar Manohar L. Varadpande, praised the ritual as "social occasions of great magnitude". Rick F. Talbott writes that "Mircea Eliade treated the Ashvamedha as a rite having a cosmogonic structure which both regenerated the entire cosmos and reestablished every social order during its performance."

== See also ==
- Ashva – Horses in Hinduism
- October Horse – Animal sacrifice to Mars
- Cruelty to animals – Negligent or abusive action against animals by humans
