= Supratisthitavarman =

King of Kamarupa
- Reign: 595–600
- Dynasty: Varman dynasty
- Father: Susthitavarman
- Mother: Shyamadevi

Supratisthitavarman ruled Kamarupa from the Varman dynasty for the period 595–600. He was son of King Susthitavarman and Queen Shyamadevi.

== Reign ==
It is stated in Bhaskaravarman's inscription that "surrounded by learned men and accompanied by a well equipped army consisting of war-elephants his (Supratisthitavarman's) birth (rise) was for the good of others". Supratisthitavarman introduced many reforms during his rule. He not able to reign for long and died during the life-time of his father. He was succeeded by his younger brother Bhaskaravarman, who actually enjoyed the fruit of his hard work, i.e. a well-organised army.

== See also ==
- Mahendravarman
- Narayanavarman
