= Avantivarman (Varman dynasty) =

- Predecessor: Bhaskaravarman
- Dynasty: Varman dynasty
- Religion: Hinduism

Avantivarman is believed to be the last king of the Varman dynasty of Kamarupa in present-day North-East India.

No direct evidence of this king exists, nor does this name appear anywhere in a historical record — the name Avanti Varma itself is reconstructed from the benedictory verses of a Sanskrit play Mudrarakshasa by Vishakhadatta. According to some scholars, the "Avantivarma" of Mudrarakshasa is actually another king of the Maukhari dynasty.

According to Bargaon grant of Ratnapal, Mlechchha king Salasthambha took over the rule of Kamarupa from the descendants of Naraka. K.L. Barua states that there was a Mlechha revolt in Kamarupa and the leader of the Mlecchas usurped the throne by deposing Bhaskaravarman's immediate successor Avantivarman. Mukunda Madhava Sharma theorizes that Salasthambha must have overthrown the immediate successor of Bhaskaravarman. P.C Choudhury opines that Salasthambha, the founder of Mlechchha dynasty was known as Avantivarman.

== See also ==
- Pala Dynasty
