= Brahmaputra (disambiguation) =

Brahmaputra may refer to:

- Brahmaputra River, a river of Asia, in Tibet (China), India and Bangladesh
  - Old Brahmaputra River, a distributary of the Brahmaputra in north-central Bangladesh
- INS Brahmaputra, ships of the Indian Navy
- Brahma Puthrudu, a 1988 Indian Telugu-language film

== See also ==
- Yarlung Tsangpo, the upper stream of the Brahmaputra in Tibet
- Lauhitya kingdom, an ancient Indian kingdom on the Brahmaputra (which is also known as Lauhitya)
