= Assamese calendar =

Luni-solar calendar

The Assamese Calendar (Assamese: ভাস্কৰাব্দ, lit. 'Bhāskarābda') is a Lunisolar calendar, followed in the Indian state of Assam. The New Year in the Assamese calendar is known as Bohag Bihu. The calendar is counted from the date of the ascension of Kumar Bhashkar Barman to the throne of Kamarupa. It differs 593 years with Gregorian calendar.

== Months ==
Assamese name	Romanised	Sanskrit name	Gregorian	No. of days
ব’হাগ	Böhag	Vaiśākha	April-May	31
জেঠ	Zeth	Jyeṣṭha	May-June	31
আহাৰ	Ahar	Āṣāḍha	June-July	32
শাওণ	Xaün	Śrāvaṇa	July-August	31
ভাদ	Bhado	Bhādrapada	August-September	31
আহিন	Ahin	Aśvina	September-October	31
কাতি	Kati	Kārtika	October-November	30
আঘোণ	Aghün	Mārgaśīrṣa/Agrahayana	November-December	29
পুহ	Puh	Pauśa	December-January	29
মাঘ	Magh	Māgha	January-February	30
ফাগুন	Fagun	Phālguna	February-March	30
চ’ত	Söt	Caitra	March-April	30

== Days ==
The Assamese Calendar incorporates the seven-day week as used by many other calendars.

দেওবাৰ/ৰবিবাৰ	Deübar/Robibar	Sun	Sunday	Ravivāsara
সোমবাৰ	Xümbar	Soma/Moon	Monday	Somavāsara
মঙলবাৰ	Moṅolbar	Mangala/Mars	Tuesday	Maṅgalavāsara
বুধবাৰ	Budhbar	Budha/Mercury	Wednesday	Budhavāsara
বৃহস্পতিবাৰ	Brihospotibar	Brihaspati/Jupiter	Thursday	Brhaspativāsara
শুকুৰবাৰ	Xukurbar	Shukra/Venus	Friday	Śukravāsara
শনিবাৰ	Xonibar	Shani/Saturn	Saturday	Śanivāsara

== See also ==
- Manipuri calendar
- Tripuri calendar
