= Kumar Bhaskar Varma Setu =

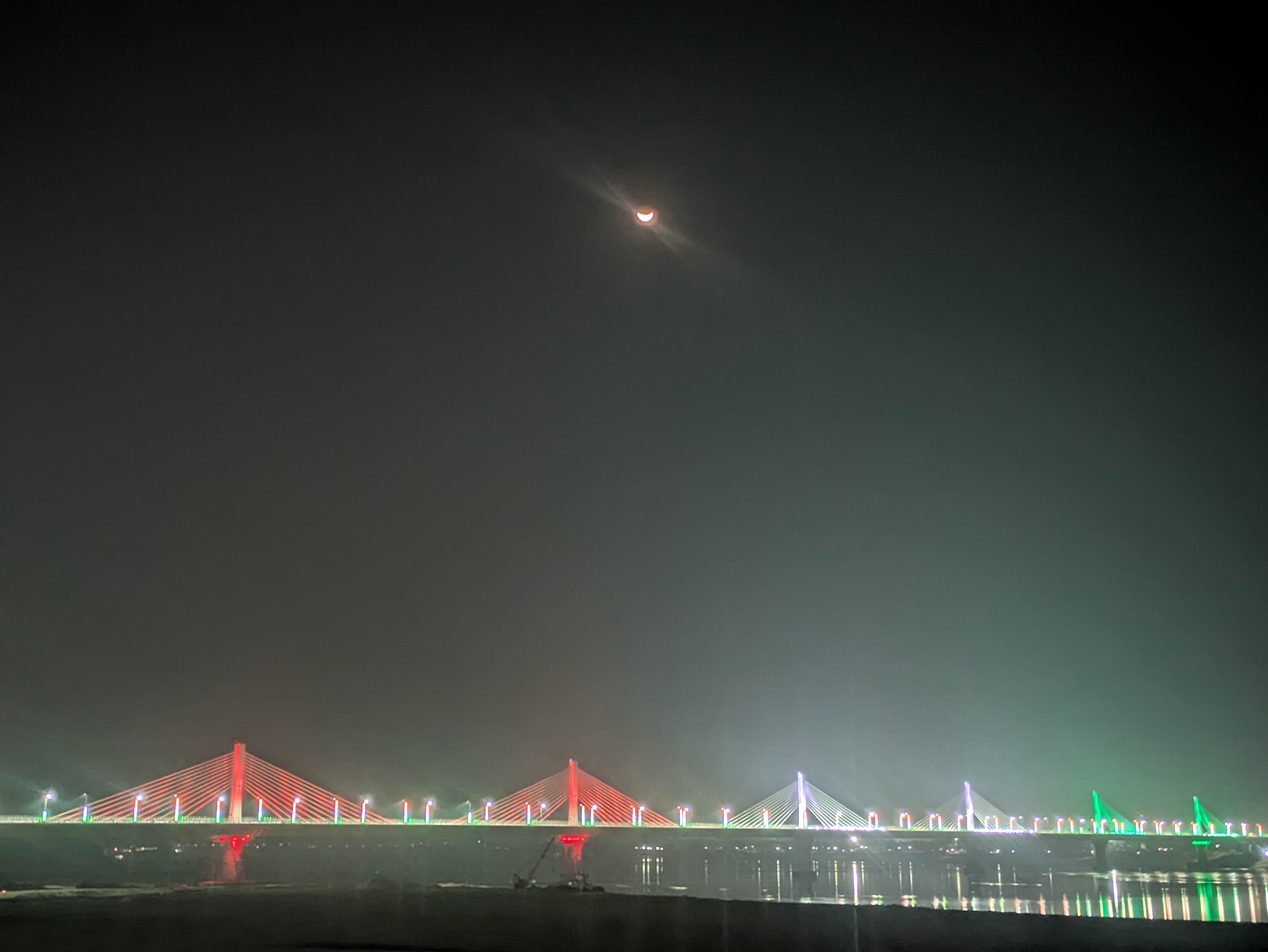
- Night view of Kumar Bhaskar Varma Setu
- Coordinates: 26.1790795°N 91.7244616°E
- Carries: 6 lanes of roadway
- Crosses: Brahmaputra River
- Locale: North Guwahati-Guwahati, Assam, India
- Named for: Kumar Bhaskar Varma
- Owner: Government of Assam

Characteristics
- Design: Extradosed bridge
- Material: Steel and concrete
- Total length: 1.24 kilometres (0.77 mi)

History
- Construction end: 2026
- Construction cost: ₹3,030 crore (US$310 million)
- Opened: 14 February 2026
- Inaugurated: Narendra Modi

Location
- Location in Assam, India

Kumar Bhaskar Varma Setu is a six-lane road bridge over the Brahmaputra River in Assam, India. It connects Guwahati with North Guwahati, significantly enhancing transportation and regional connectivity in the Northeast India. The bridge is named after the 7th-century Kamarupa king Kumar Bhaskar Varma.

It is the seventh completed bridge over Brahmaputra in Assam and the third in Guwahati, after both Saraighat bridges.

== History ==
Construction of the Kumar Bhaskar Varma Setu began as part of an infrastructure push to improve connectivity across the Brahmaputra River in Assam. The 1.24-kilometre-long extradosed bridge was built at an estimated cost of around ₹3,030 crore (US$310 million).
