= Avantivarman =

Avantivarman may refer to any of the following Indian kings:

- Avantivarman (Utpala dynasty), ruled Kashmir in 9th century CE
- Avanti Varman of Kamarupa, ruled present-day Assam in 7th century CE
