= Dubi copperplate inscription =

Inscription from ancient Assam (India)

The Dubi copperplate inscription are the inscriptions of a grant issued by Bhaskaravarman of Kamarupa. This is the earliest of all copper plate grants issued by Kamarupa kings discovered so far. This was an issue after an earlier charter, issued by Bhutivarman, was destroyed. There are five copper plates in this collection, with seventy-six verses in Sanskrit, written in the eastern variety of North Indian alphabet prevalent in the sixth and seventh centuries. All six plates in this grant were first discovered around 1950 during digging near a Siva temple in Dubi village about three miles from the Pathsala railway station, Kamrup district, Assam; but the sixth plate was irrecoverably destroyed soon after discovery. These plates are currently in the Assam State Museum. This plate was issued before the Nidhanpur copperplate inscription, during the earlier part of Bhaskkaravarman's reign.

== Seal ==
The bundle of plates is held together with a ring and a bronze seal. The seal is oval in shape, with a countersunk figure of an elephant from front at the top, a typical feature of all Kamarupa seals. The bottom two-thirds of the seal has eleven lines of Sanskrit text, with the text separated from the elephant figure with a line. The text gives the line of kings from the great king of kings Sri Pushyavarma, the lord of Pragjyotisha to Bhaskaravarman, with some of the names replaced by synonyms.
