= Susthitavarman =

King of Kamarupa
- Dynasty: Varman dynasty
- Father: Sthitavarman
- Mother: Nayanadevi

Susthitavarman (also known as Sri-Mriganka) (590-595) was a ruler of Kamarupa. He was a son of Sthitavarman and Queen Nayanadevi.

== Reign ==
Susthitavarman was renowned as Sri-Mriganka. He was succeeded by his two sons, Supratisthitavarman and Bhaskaravarman one after the other. Though Harsha Charita states Bhaskaravarman succeeded his father directly, Bhaskarvarman's own inscription states he came to power after his brother had ruled for a while.

== See also ==
- Chandramukhavarman
- Bhaskarvarman
