= Kalyanavarman (Varman dynasty) =

King of Kamarupa
- Dynasty: Varman

Kalyanavarman ruled Kamarupa from the Varman dynasty for the period of 422–446 A.D. He was the son of Kamrupi king Balavarman and queen Ratnavati. He married Gandharvavati and had a successor to throne named Ganapativarman.

== Reign ==
Some scholars opine that during the tenure of Kalayanavarman, the kingdom of Davaka in central Assam was absorbed by Kamarupa.

== See also ==
- Pushyavarman
- Samudravarman
