= Chandramukhavarman =

King of Kamarupa
- Dynasty: Varman

Chandramukhavarman ruled Kamarupa from the Varman dynasty for the period 542–566, was son of Kamarupi King Bhutivarman and Queen Vijnanavati.

== Reign ==
Chandramukha, who was charming as name suggests, by (possessing) all the arts as the moon (by the digits ), whom Queen Vijnanavati brought forth, as the sky did (the moon), a dispeller of (all) gloom (as the moon dispels the darkness). He married Bhogavati and had successor to throne named Sthitavarman.

== See also ==
- Mahendravarman
- Narayanavarman
