= Ganapativarman =

King of Kamarupa
- Dynasty: Varman

Ganapativarman ruled Kamarupa from the Varman dynasty for the period 446-470 A.D, was son of Kamrupi king Kalyanavarman and queen Gandharvavati. He married Yajnavati and had successor to throne named Mahendravarman.

== See also ==
- Samudravarman
- Balavarman
