= Pragjyotishpura =

Ancient city and region in Assam, India

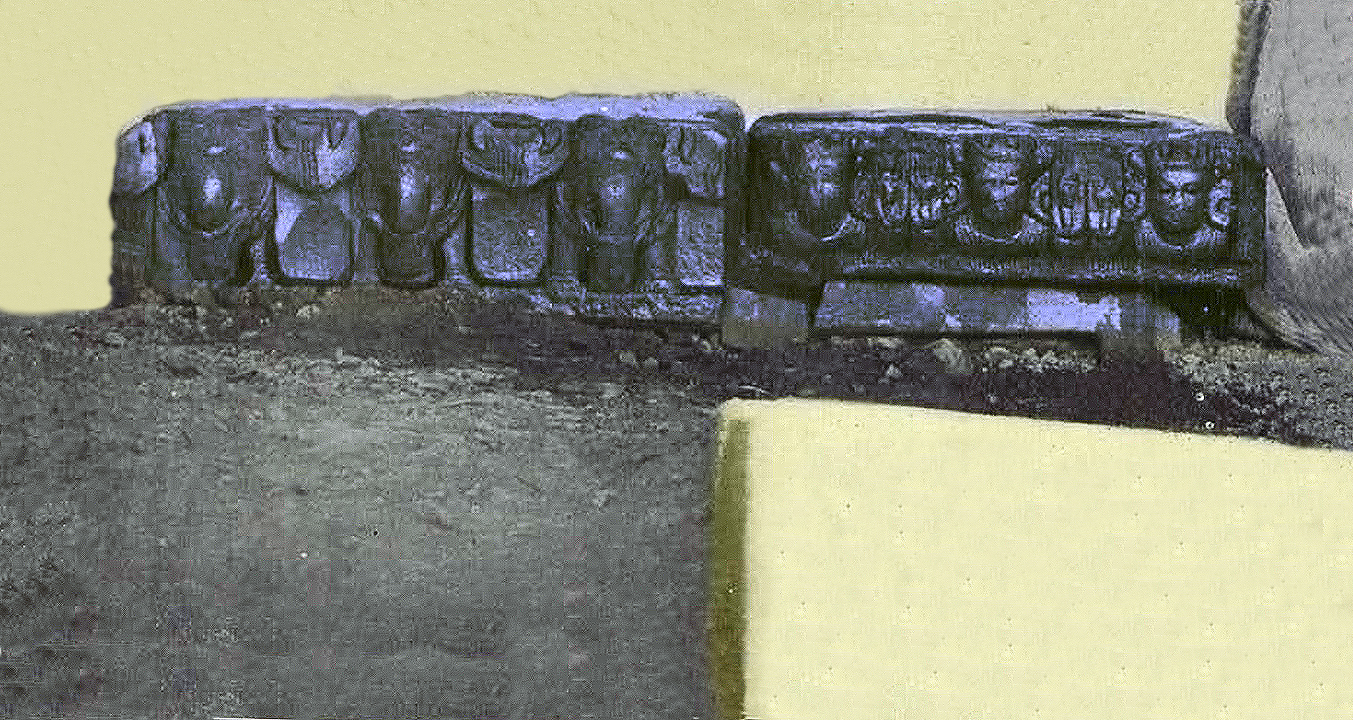
Ruins of Pragjyotishpura

Pragjyotishpura or Pragjyotisapura, now deemed to be a region within modern Guwahati, is claimed to be an ancient city and capital of the Varman dynasty (350 - 650 A.D). Though the earliest mention of Pragjyotisha in local sources come from the 7th century, the form was changed to Pragjyotishpura in the 9th century which describes it as the city of Naraka within Kamarupa.

In the Ramayana, Pragjyotishpura is described as the fortress of Narakasura on mount Varaha located in the north-west of the Indian subcontinent in what is modern-day Punjab and Sindh.

== Etymology ==
The Pragjyotishpura is derived from Sanskrit. Prachya means east or eastern and 'jyotisha' which is used allegorically to mean learning and 'pura' a city thus meaning ' city of learning to the east' otherwise 'city of eastern learning'.

== Location of Pragjyotishpura ==
No inscription up to the 12th century, when the kingdom of Kamarupa came to an end, give an indication of the location of Pragjyotishpura, and the exact location is not known. Three late medieval inscriptions seem to suggest that Pragjyotishpura included the Ganeshguri (inscription from Dununtarai, 1577). Southern slope of Nilachal hills (inscription from Dihingiya Borphukan 1732) and Navagraha temple (inscription Tarun Duara Borphukan, 1752). There are various other theories that modern historians have put forward, but none of them are backed by archaeological evidence. The location of a temple of planet worship called Navagraha, meaning abode of nine planets of the Solar System, and its connection with ancient research on astronomy and astrology lends weight to the origin of its name.

== See also ==
- Durjaya
