= Mahendravarman (Varman dynasty) =

King of Kamarupa from 470 to 494

King of Kamarupa
- Reign: 470–494
- Predecessor: Ganapativarman
- Successor: Narayanavarman
- Spouse: Suvrata
- Issue: Narayanavarman
- Dynasty: Varman
- Father: Ganapativarman
- Mother: Yajnavati

Mahendravarman ruled Kamarupa from the Varman dynasty from 470–494. was son of King Ganapativarman and Queen Yajnavati.

== Successor ==
He married Suvrata and had successor to throne named Narayanavarman.

== Characteristics ==
It is said that he mastered his self, and worked towards the stability (of the rule) of world, who like Janaka (or his father) was well versed in the principles of the philosophy of the (supreme) Self.

== See also ==
- Balavarman
- Kalyanavarman
