= Bhutivarman =

King of Kamarupa
- Dynasty: Varman

Bhutivarman or Mahabhutavarman, ruled Kamarupa from the Varman dynasty for the period 518-542, was son of Kamarupi King Narayanavarman and Queen Devavati.

== Reign ==
Mahabhutavarman is mentioned in the Harsha Charita as Bhutivarman. As a matter of fact, in line 51 of the Nidhanpur inscription itself Mahabhutavarman is referred to as Bhutivarman. Evidently he was popularly known as Bhutivarman. He married Vijnanavati and had successor to throne named Chandramukhavarman. He married Bhogavati and had successor to throne named Sthitavarman.

Under his reign, "Kamarupa became a powerful kingdom."

== See also ==
- Pushyavarman
- Ganapativarman
