= Sthitavarman =

King of Kamarupa
- Dynasty: Varman

Sthitavarman ruled Kamarupa from the Varman dynasty for the period 566–590, was son of Kamarupi King Chandramukhavarman and Queen Bhogavati.

== Reign ==
Sthitavarman, the supporter of the world, has innumerable (sources of) enjoyment. He married Nayanadevi and had successor to throne named Susthitavarman.

== See also ==
- Balavarman
- Bhutivarman
