= Lauhitya kingdom =

Ancient Indian Kingdom

Lauhitya (Lohity, Lohitya etc. as variations) was the easternmost country (it is also the name of a river) known to the people of the epic-age (Treta Yuga or Dvapara Yuga) in Hindu cosmology. Parshuram is believed to have visited. The Pandava Bhima visited the kingdom during his eastern military campaign to collect tribute for Yudhishthira's Rajasuya sacrifice. Naga king Lohita ruled a territory close to Kashmira. It is not known if the Nagas lived in Kashmir.

== History ==
Kautilya Arthashastra, Mandasor Pillar Inscriptions of Yasodharman and the Aphsad inscription of Ādityasena mention Lauhitya as the easternmost kingdom. During the 5th to 2nd century BCE, historical records mention the existence of Lauhitya instead of Kamrupa, suggesting a potential absence of Brahmanical influence during that period. Lauhitya was the Eastern boundary of Gauda. Baladitya II launched his eastern campaigns, and extended his territories as far as Lauhitya. The Kamrupa word first appeared in the Samudragupta Allahabad Edict.

== Mahabharata ==
=== Naga King ===
A Naga named Lohita was mentioned at (2,9) along with other Naga kings including Vasuki, Takshaka, and Airavata.

Lohita ruled a territory close to Kasmira. Arjuna visited this kingdom during his military campaign to the north, to collect tribute for Yudhishthira's Rajasuya sacrifice. Arjuna then defeated the brave Kshatriyas of Kashmira and king Lohita along with ten minor chiefs. (2,26)

=== Easternmost territory ===
Bhima, during his military campaign to the east, to collect tribute for Yudhishthira's Rajasuya sacrifice, subjugated in battle Paundraka-Vasudeva, the king of Pundra and king Mahaujah who reigned in Kausika-kachchha. He then attacked the king of Vanga viz Samudrasena and king Chandrasena and Tamralipta, and the king of the Karvatas and the ruler of the Suhmas, and the kings who dwelt on the sea-shore, and all Mlechchha tribes. He then advanced towards Lohita. Bhima then caused all the Mlechchha kings dwelling in the marshy regions on the sea-coast, to pay tributes. (2,29).

=== River ===
Lohitya is mentioned along with Ananga, Pushpaveni, Utpalavati, Karatoya, Vrishasabhya, Kumari and Rishikullya as the rivers of ancient India (Bharata Varsha) at (6,9). Lohitya is mentioned as a great river at (13,165). It is mentioned along with Sarayu and Gandaki and other big rivers. A holy place named Urvasi (named after the Apsara Urvasi) is said to be situated in the river Lohitya (13,25). Parshuram is mentioned to have created a pilgrim center at Lauhitya (3,85).

== See also ==
- Kingdoms of Ancient India
- List of Mahabharata people and places on Wisdom Library
