= Pushyavarman =

King of Kamarupa
- Reign: 350–374
- Predecessor: Position established
- Successor: Samudravarman
- Dynasty: Varman

Pushyavarman (Reign 350–374) was the first historical ruler of Kamarupa (Assam) in eastern India, who established the Varman dynasty in 350 AD.

== Tenure ==
Pushyavarman encouraged Vedic culture to flourish in his country. Hindu influence was widespread during his reign. He maintained cultural, political and diplomatic relationship with other states under Gupta Empire, most notably rulers of stature like Samudra Gupta. One of Pushyavarman's sons was Samudravarman, who married Datta Devi. The name of the queen of his great contemporary, Samudra Gupta, was also Datta Devi, probably both married in the same family. Though they were related, Samudra Gupta fought and defeated Samudravarman's son Balavarman, in connection with his performance of the Asvamedha sacrifice. This is recorded in Samudra Gupta's Allahabad Inscription. Gupta had to quell internal dissidence as well as external threats. Just as Samudra Gupta founded an empire which finally included the Indian subcontinent, Samudravarman extended his power to the Eastern Peninsula, adjoining the Pacific Ocean.

== See also ==
- Narakasur
- Bhaskaravarman
