= Varman dynasty =

Ruling dynasty of Kamarupa kingdom in ancient India between 350 CE – 655 CE

Kamarupa Kingdom Varman dynasty
- 350 CE–655 CE
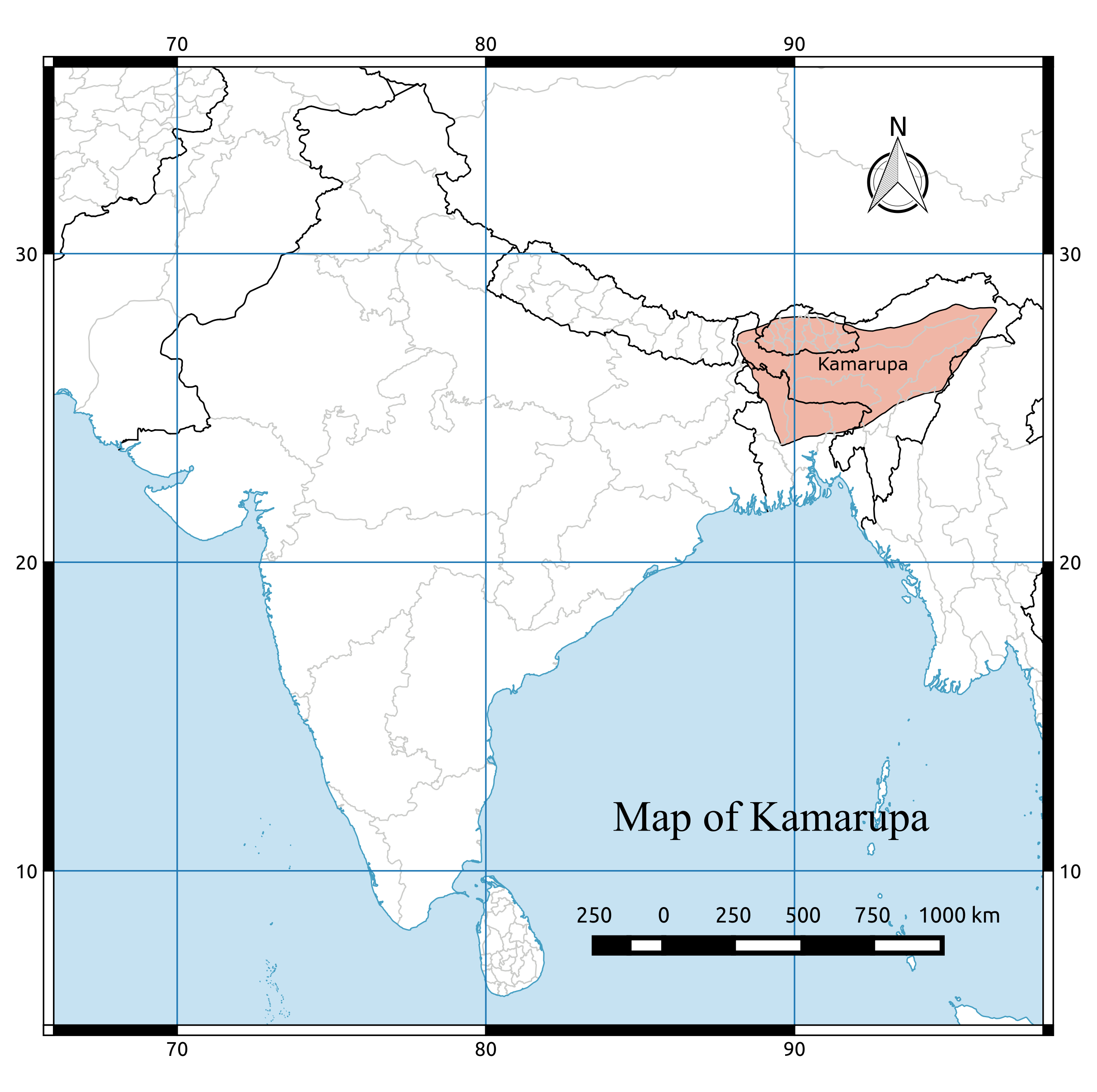
- The traditional map of Kamarupa.
- Capital: Pragjyotishpura
- Official languages: Sanskrit, Kamarupi Prakrit, Old Assamese
- Religion: Hinduism, Tribal religion
- Government: Monarchy
- Maharajadhiraja
  - c. 350 – c. 374: Pushyavarman
  - c. 518 – c. 542: Bhutivarman
  - c. 600 – c. 650: Bhaskaravarman
- Historical era: Classical India
  - Established: 350 CE
  - Disestablished: 655 CE
Preceded by	Succeeded by
Bhauma dynasty	Mlechchha dynasty

The Varman dynasty (350–650) was the first historical dynasty of the Kamarupa kingdom. It was established by Pushyavarman, a contemporary of Samudragupta. The earlier Varmans were subordinates of the Gupta Empire, but as the power of the Guptas waned, Mahendravarman (470–494) performed two horse sacrifices and the status of Kamarupa as an independent state remained unimpaired. As per the Apsad Inscription of Adityasen, Susthivarman was defeated by Mahasengupta on the bank of Lauhitya. The first of the three Kamarupa dynasties, the Varmans were followed by the Mlechchha and then the Pala dynasties.

== Origin ==
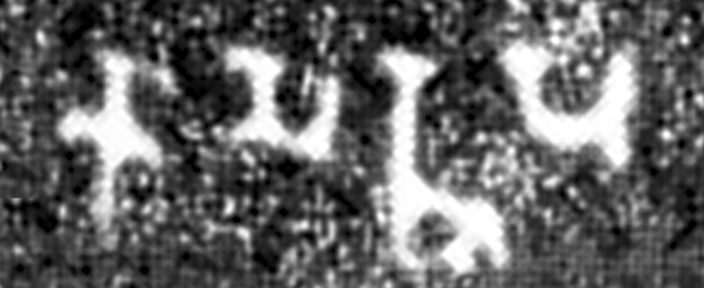
The name "Kāmarūpa" in later Brahmi script, in the Allahabad Pillar inscription of Samudragupta (350-375 CE).

The first king in this dynasty was Pushyavarman, possibly a contemporary of Samudragupta (c. 335/350-375 CE). The kingdom which he established with much effort, grew in the periphery of the Gupta Empire, adopted the north Indian political model, and its kings took on names and titles of the Gupta kings and queens. Nothing much is known directly about the initial kings till the sixth king, Mahendravarman, who established a rock temple and assumed the title of Maharajadhiraja (king-of-kings) in the last quarter of the fifth century. The dynastic line from Pushyavarman first appear in the 7th century, in Dubi and Nidhanpur copperplate inscriptions issued by Bhaskaravarman and in the Harshacharita and not earlier in any inscription from his ancestors. In these inscriptions Bhaskaravarman claims that he was a descendant of Narakasur, Bhagadatta and Vajradatta. Modern scholars consider this claim to be a fabrication, jae-eun shin suggests that this genealogy was created in the context of Bharkarvarman's alliance with Harshavardhana, to help legitimise his sovereignty. The use of Naraka/Bhagadatta lineage to establish sovereignty continued under the Mlechchha and the Pala dynasties, a practice which is in keeping with the trend in the post-Gupta period in India.

She-Kia-Fang-Che claiming him to be a kshatriya whose ancestors came from China. Though some modern scholars have opined that the Varman dynasty is probably of Indo-Aryan descent, it is now believed that the Varmans were originally non-Indo-Aryans. Suniti Kumar Chatterjee calls Bhaskaravarman a Hinduised Mlechcha king of Indo-Mongoloid origin. Hugh B. Urban also infers that the Varmans descended from non-Aryan tribes.

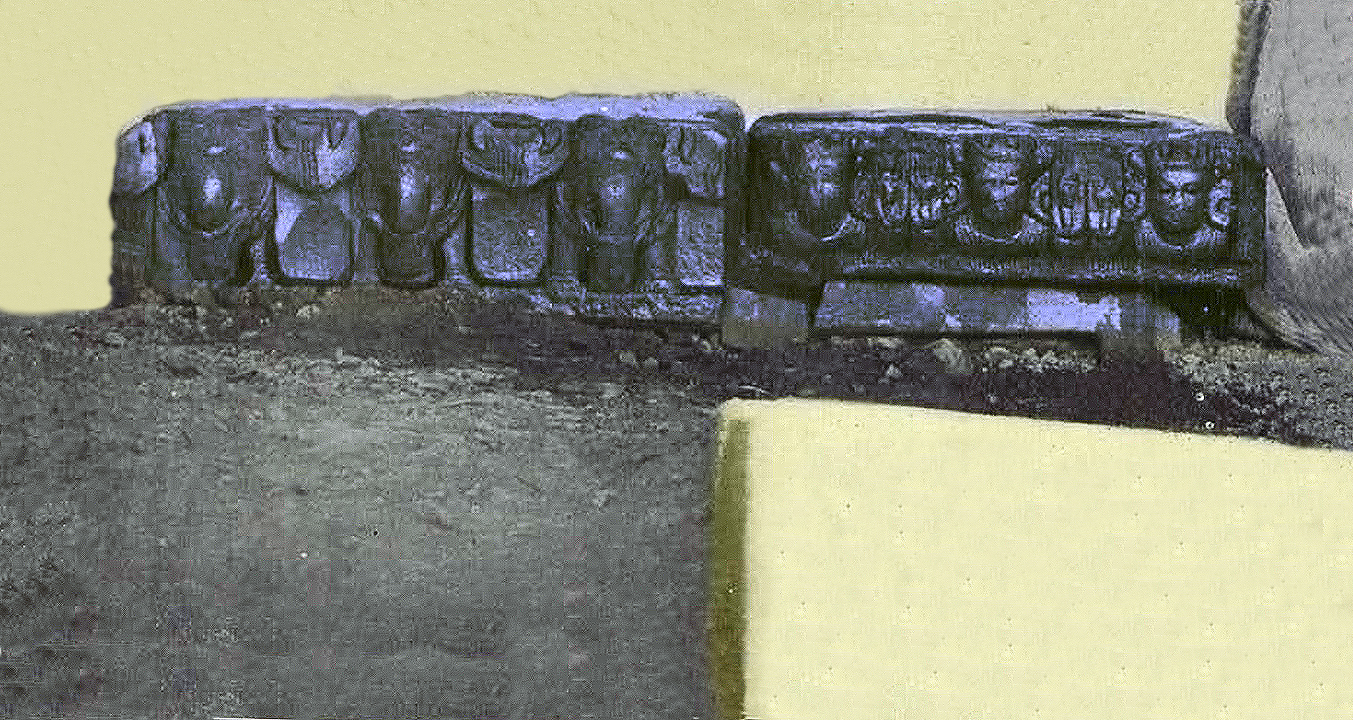
Relics of Pragjyotishpura, the capital of Varmans

== Capital ==
The capital was moved at least once, the last time by Sthitavarman (566-590) with the older city not named but presumed to be Pragjyotishpura, located at the south-eastern slope of the Narakasur hill near Dispur. The new capital was possibly some location in Guwahati. Though the claim is not supported by any archaeological findings.

== Politics and diplomacy ==
The Varman's modeled themselves after the Gupta's and named themselves after the Gupta kings and queens.

== The dynasty ==
The dynastic line, as given in the Dubi and Nidhanpur copperplate inscriptions:

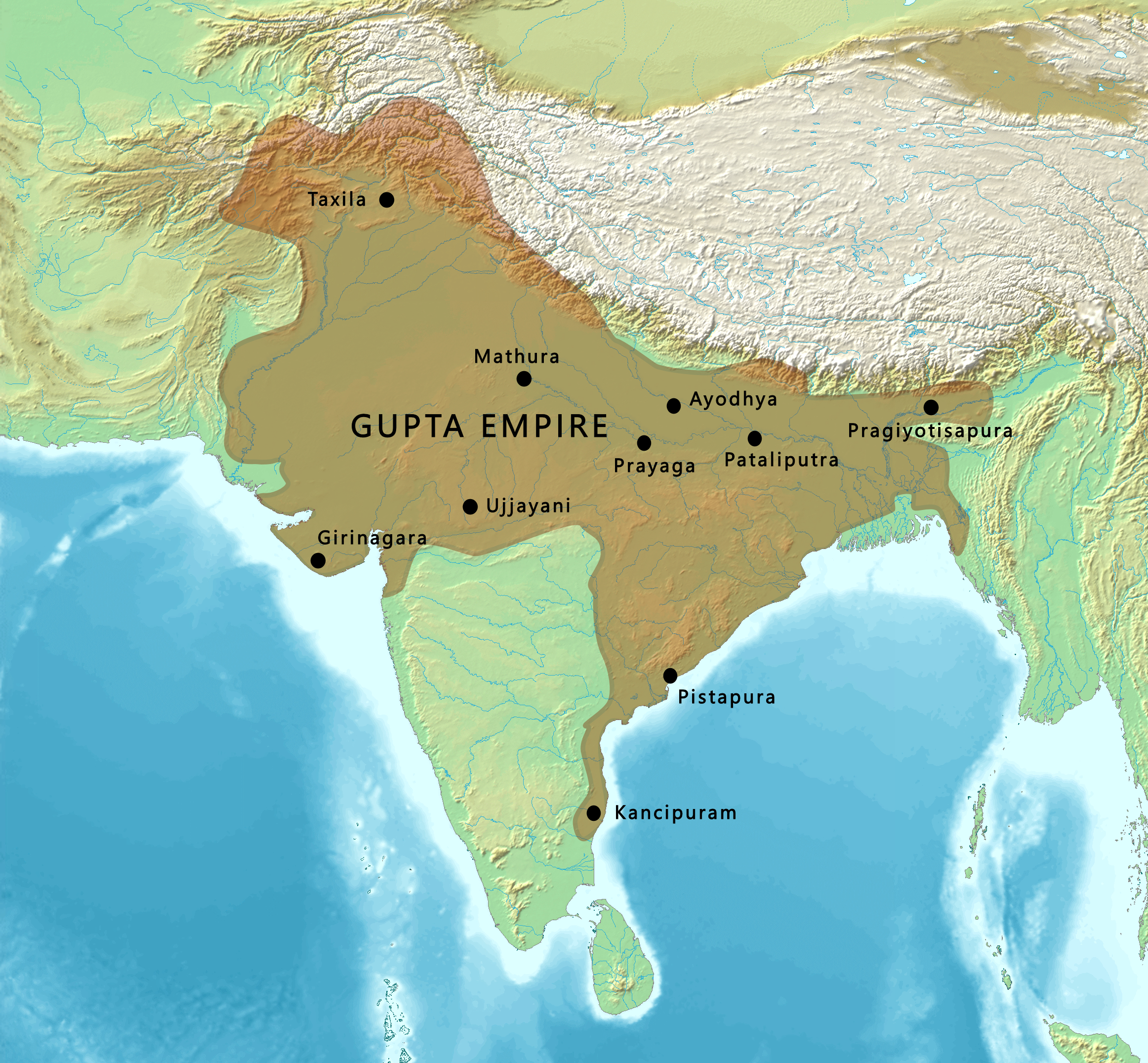
Location of the Varmans and neighbouring polities circa 400-450 CE.

	Reign	Name	succession	Queen
1	350-374	Pushyavarman		(unknown)
2	374-398	Samudravarman	son of Pushyavarman	Dattadevi
3	398-422	Balavarman	son of Samudravarman	Ratnavati
4	422-446	Kalyanavarman	son of Balavarman	Gandharavati
5	446-470	Ganapativarman	son of Kalyanavarman	Yajnavati
6	470-494	Mahendravarman	son of Ganapativarman	Suvrata
7	494-518	Narayanavarman	son of Mahendravarman	Devavati
8	518-542	Bhutivarman	son of Narayanavarman	Vijnayavati
9	542-566	Chandramukhavarman	son of Bhutivarman	Bhogavati
10	566-590	Sthitavarman	son of Chandramukhavarman	Nayanadevi
11	590-595	Susthitavarman	son of Sthitavarman	Syamadevi
12	595-600	Supratisthitavarman	son of Susthitavarman	(Bachelor)
13	600-650	Bhaskaravarman	brother of Supratisthitavarman	(Bachelor)
14	650-655	Avantivarman	(unknown)	(unknown)

== Family tree ==
Varman dynasty

Pushyavarman^{(1)} r. c. 350-374
Samudravarman^{(2)} r. c. 374-398
Balavarman^{(3)} r. c. 398-422
Kalyanavarman^{(4)} r. c. 422-446
Ganapativarman^{(5)} r. c. 446-470
Mahendravarman^{(6)} r. c. 470-494
Narayanavarman^{(7)} r. c. 494-518
Bhutivarman^{(8)} r. c. 518-542
Chandramukhavarman^{(9)} r. c. 542-566
Sthitavarman^{(10)} r. c. 566-590
Susthitavarman^{(11)} r. c. 590-595
Supratisthitavarman^{(12)} r. c. 595-600	Bhaskaravarman^{(13)} r. c. 600-650

== Bibliography ==
- Beal, Samuel (1884). Si-Yu-Ki. Buddhist Records of the Western World, Translated from the Chinese of Hsüan-tsang (A.D. 629). Vol. II. London: Trubner & Co.
- Chatterji, Suniti Kumar (1951). Kirata-jana-krti. Calcutta: The Asiatic Society.
- Chattopadhyaya, S (1990), "Social Life", in Barpujari, H K (ed.), The Comprehensive History of Assam, vol. I, Guwahati: Publication Board, Assam, pp. 195–232
- Choudhury, P. C. (1966). The History of the Civilisation of the People of Assam to the Twelfth Century AD. Gauhati: Department of Historical and Antiquarian Studies of Assam.
- Lahiri, Nayanjot (1991), Pre-Ahom Assam: Studies in the Inscriptions of Assam between the Fifth and the Thirteenth Centuries AD, Munshiram Manoharlal Publishers
- Mukherji, Ramaranjan; Maity, Sachindra Kumar (1967). Corpus Of Bengal Inscriptions Bearing On History And Civilization Of Bengal. Calcutta: Firma K. L. Mukhopadhyay.
- Ray, H.C. (1931). Dynastic History Of Northern India Vol. 1. New Delhi: Munshiram Manoharlal Publishers.
- Sen, Sailendra Nath (1999). Ancient Indian History and Civilization. New Age International. ISBN 9788122411980.
- Sharma, Mukunda Madhava (1978). Inscriptions of Ancient Assam. Gauhati University, Assam.
- Shin, Jae-Eun (2010). "Changing Dynasties, Enduring Genealogy: A Critical Study on the Political Legitimation in Early Medieval Kamarupa". Journal of Ancient Indian History. XXVII.
- Shin, Jae-Eun (2018), "Region Formed and Imagined: Reconsidering temporal, spatial and social context of Kamarupa", in Dzüvichü, Lipokmar; Baruah, Manjeet (eds.), Modern Practices in North East India: History, Culture, Representation, London & New York: Routledge, pp. 23–55
- Sircar, D C (1990), "Political History", in Barpujari, H K (ed.), The Comprehensive History of Assam, vol. I, Guwahati: Publication Board, Assam, pp. 94–171
- Urban, Hugh B. (2011). "The Womb of Tantra: Goddesses, Tribals, and Kings in Assam". The Journal of Hindu Studies. 4 (3): 231–247. doi:10.1093/jhs/hir034.
- Xuan-zhuang (1996). Bian-ji (ed.). The Great Tang Dynasty Record of the Western Regions. Vol. 51. Translated by Li Rongxi. BDK America. ISBN 1-886439-02-8. Archived from the original on 18 June 2019.
