= Narayanavarman =

King of Kamarupa
- Dynasty: Varman

Narayanavarman ruled Kamarupa from the Varman dynasty for the period 494–518, was son of Kamarupi King Mahendravarman and Queen Suvrata. He married Devavati and had successor to throne named Bhutivarman.

== Reign ==
According to the Nidhanpur inscription, Ganapativarman was generous in his gifts while Narayanavarman was, like king Janaka, deeply versed in the knowledge of the self.

== See also ==
- Samudravarman
- Balavarman
