= Samudravarman =

King of Kamarupa
- Dynasty: Varman

Samudravarman was ruler of Kamarupa, for the period 374-398 AD. He was son of Pushyavarman, the founder of Varman Dynasty of Kamarupa.

== Reign ==
Samudravarman who was likened to the 5th ocean, in whose kingdom the weak were not oppressed by the strong, who shone like a jewel and who was quick in accepting a duel. Datta-Devi was the name of his queen, she gave birth to Balavarman whose strength (Bala) and armor (Varma) were never separated and whose soldiers were always forward against his enemies. It is known from the inscriptions of Samudra Gupta that the name of his queen, too, was Datta-Devi, and that he defeated king Balavarman. It appears from this that Samudra Gupta and Samudravarman married in the same family. Thus, Samudra Gupta was compelled, in spite of this relation, to fight with Balavarman according to the rules of Asvamedha sacrifice which took place in 350-380 A.D. So it may be admitted that he lived about this time. Perhaps this invasion of Samudra Gupta limited the power of the kings of Kamarupa for a time.

== See also ==
- Bhaskaravarman
