= Balavarman =

King of Kamarupa from 398 to 422

King of Kamarupa
- Reign: 398–422
- Predecessor: Samudravarman
- Successor: Kalyanavarman
- Dynasty: Varman

Balavarman ruled Kamarupa for the period 398–422. He was successor and son of Samudravarman.

== Reign ==
He was known for great amount of physical strength as reflected in his name and courage. His soldiers were always on front against enemy. Balavarman fought wars with Samudragupta, in spite of relationship.

== Family ==
His wife's name is Ratnavati who gave birth to Kalyanavarman. He arranged Svayamvara for his daughter Amritaprabha, which are attended by princes of different countries of Aryavarta. Rajtarangini of Kalhana gives detail accounts of this event. Princess eventually accepted prince of Kashmir Meghavahana as her groom. Amritaprabha established numerous Buddhist monasteries in Kashmir.

== See also ==
- Varman Dynasty
