= Bhaskaravarman =

Ruler of the Kamarupa kingdom in ancient India from 600 to 650 CE

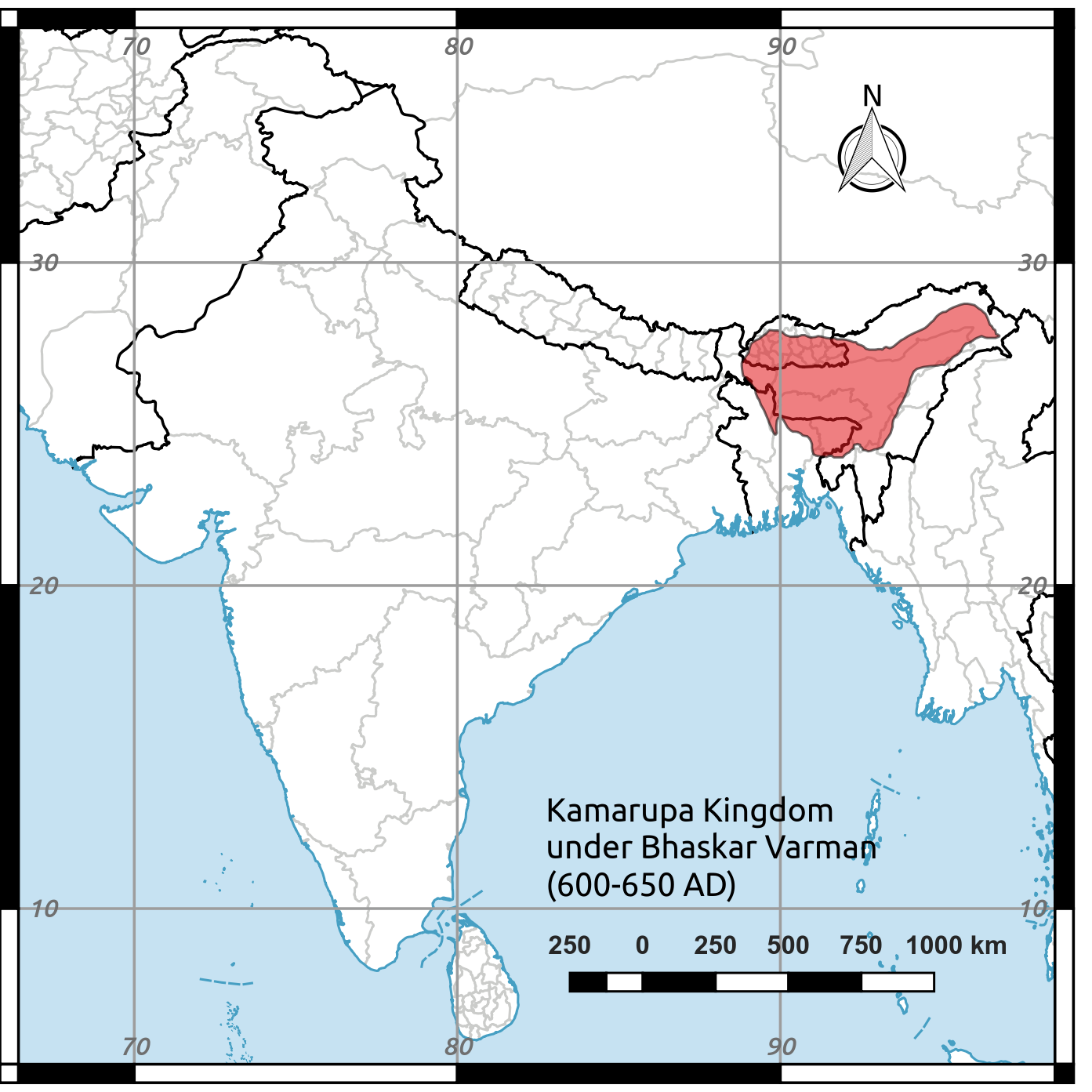
- The 7th-century Kamarupa kingdom under Bhaskaravarman. The kingdom extended to the east up to the hills leading to China, according to the Chinese pilgrim Xuanzang who visited Bhaskarbarman's court during his reign around 643 CE.

King of Kamarupa
- Reign: 600–650 CE

Bhaskaravarman (600–650 CE) was king of Kamarupa and the last ruler of the Varman dynasty. He restored Varman rule after his father, Susthitavarman, was defeated, and allied with Harshavardhana of Thaneswar during a conflict against Gauda and East Malwa.

== Background ==
Bhaskaravarman succeeded his brother Supratisthitavarman and was the first Kamarupa king to claim descent from Narakasura, Bhagadatta, and Vajradatta. He issued the Dubi and Nidhanpur copper plate grants. A clay seal bearing his name was found at Nalanda.

After Susthitavarman's defeat by Mahasenagupta, Supratisthitavarman briefly ruled but died without an heir. Bhaskaravarman then took the throne around 600 CE.

== Rivals ==
Mahasenagupta allied with Shashanka and controlled northern and central Bengal after defeating Susthitavarman. After Mahasenagupta's death, Shashanka ruled Bengal. Bhaskaravarman's principal rivals were Shashanka and Prabhakaravardhana, the father of Harshavardhana.

== Alliance with Harsha ==
After Shashanka killed Harshavardhana's brother and successor, Rajyavardhana, Bhaskaravarman sent an envoy, Hangsavega, to Thaneswar to form an alliance. The event is recorded by Bana and Xuanzang.

== Chinese accounts ==
=== Xuanzang's account ===
Chinese pilgrim, Xuanzang visited Bhaskaravarman's court around 643 CE, describing the capital's circumference as thirty Li (~9 miles (14.48 km)). He described Bhaskaravarman as descendant of Narayana and a Brahmana by caste who patronized Buddhism, although he was not a Buddhist himself.

=== Dao Xuan's account ===
Origin myth mentioned by Xuanzang diverges from the account presented in the book She-Kia-Fang-Che, which describes Bhaskaravarman as a Kshatriya of Chinese ancestry.

=== Wang Xuance's account ===
After 648 CE, the envoy Wang Xuance visited Harshavardhana's court but was expelled by Yashovarman. Wang returned with an army, captured Yashovarman, and brought him to China. Bhaskaravarman aided Wang with supplies. Chinese records call Bhaskaravarman Ch-Kieu-mo (Sri-Kumara) and Kamarupa Kia-mu-lu. He gave Wang a map and requested an image of Laozi.

== Kamarupa of Bhaskaravarman ==
According to the travel account of Xuanzang, Kamarupa was entered after crossing the Karatoya River. He described the eastern boundary of the kingdom as a line of hills near the Chinese frontier and estimated its circumference at nearly 1,700 miles (approximately 2,736 kilometres).

Xuanzang recorded descriptions of the population using descriptive terms typical of seventh-century travel accounts. He noted that the inhabitants were of short stature and described them as having a yellow complexion, language that reflects contemporary ethnographic conventions rather than modern classifications. He observed that their speech differed little from that of Central India and characterized them as both violent in disposition and diligent in learning.

In religious matters, Xuanzang wrote that Bhaskaravarman followed Hindu religious traditions and was not Buddhist. He reported that the population worshipped Hindu deities and that Buddhism was not widely practiced, noting the presence of hundreds of temples and multiple religious systems with many adherents. He stated that Buddhists were present in the kingdom but practiced their devotion discreetly.

Xuanzang also recorded information conveyed to him by local inhabitants, who said that hills extended eastward as far as the borders of China. The people living in these hill regions were described as resembling those referred to as the “Man of the Lao,” reflecting second-hand reports and the classificatory language of the period.

=== Description ===
Xuanzang notes that Kamarupa was low and moist and that the crops were regular. Coconuts and jackfruits grew abundantly and were appreciated by the people. The described location is around present-day Guwahati.

According to the account given in the Si-yu-ki, the circumference of Kamarupa was about 1,700 miles (2,735.88 km). As Edward Albert Gait has pointed out, this circumference must have included the whole of the Assam valley, Surma valley, parts of North Bengal, and parts of Mymensingh.

=== Religion ===
Bhaskaravarman was primarily a worshiper of Shiva but showed respect towards Buddhist monks and scholars, reflecting an inclination towards Buddhism. The general populace worshipped various Devas in temples, while Buddhist followers often practiced their devotion in secret.

=== Culture ===
During his reign, the Nidhanpur copper plate grant documents unique local literary forms, while Chinese accounts describe diplomatic exchanges with Harshavardhana's court. The Karnasuvarna copper plate grant also features distinct regional literary styles not found in later inscriptions.

=== Art and industry ===
His gifts to Harshavardhana included land products such as a royal umbrella studded with gems, puthis on sachi-bark, cane mats, agar essence, musk, molasses, utensils, paintings, and silk fabrics, as recorded in contemporary accounts.

== Nidhanpur inscription ==
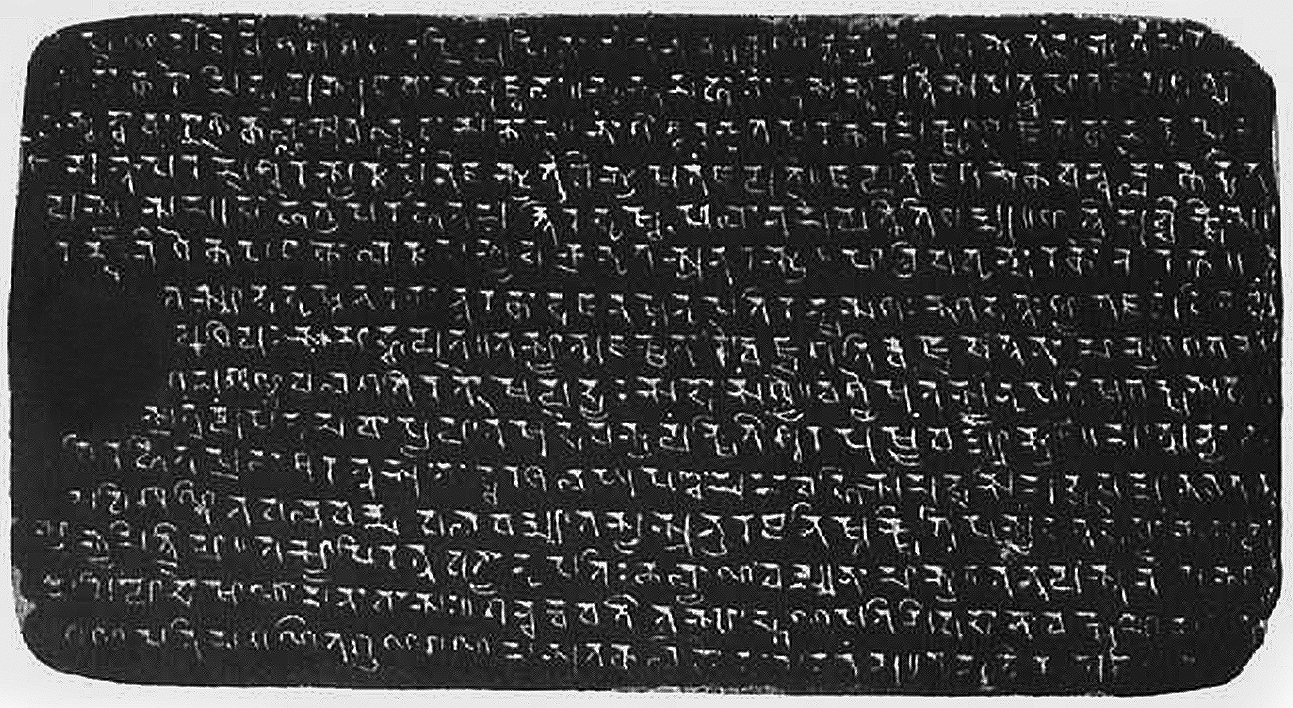
Nidhanpur inscription of Bhaskaravarman

The Nidhanpur copper plate inscription describes him using traditional royal epithets, stating he “dispelled the darkness of the Kali age” and “upheld Arya religion with his revenues”—typical ceremonial language found in contemporary royal inscriptions. He is metaphorically adorned with fame from defeated kings’ praises and compared to legendary figures for charity and wisdom. The inscription attributes to him qualities typical of royal panegyrics, including learning and military strength.

== Nalanda seal ==
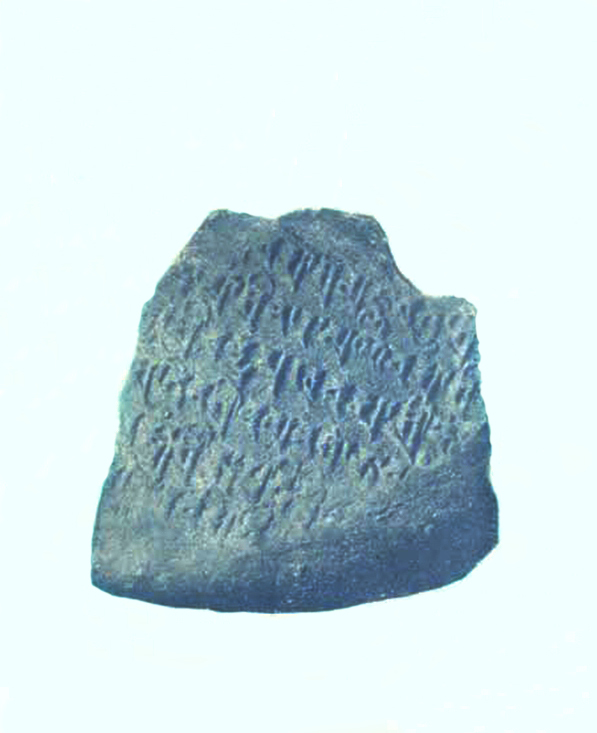
The Nalanda seal of Bhaskaravarman (dated 643 CE)

Bhaskaravarman's seal, dated 643 CE, was discovered at Nalanda with Harshvardhana seals during the 1917–18 excavations. The inscription lists royal names and may have accompanied an invitation to Xuanzang. The presence of both kings’ seals suggests they visited Nalanda

Sri Ganapati Varma Sri Yajnavatyam Sri Mahendra Varma.
Sri Suvratayam Sri Narayanavarma Sri Devavatyam Sri Mahabhuta Varman.
Sri Vijnana Vatyam Sri Chandramukha Varman Sri Bhogavatyam.
Sri Sthitavarma tena Sri Nayana Sobhayam (Sri Susthitavarman)
(Sri Syama Lakshmyam) Sri Supratisthita Varman.
Sri Bhaskara Varmeti.

K.N. Dikshit, in his “Epigraphical notes of the Nalanda finds”, proposes that the seal probably accompanied Bhaskaravarman's letter to Śīlabhadra inviting Xuanzang. Bhaskaravarman's seal was found in the company of the two Harsha seals. It is likely that both Harsha and Bhaskaravarman traveled from Rajmahal to Kanauj, specifically to visit the university of Nalanda. Besides inviting the Chinese pilgrim, they commemorated their visits by leaving their respective seals at the university.

== Death ==
The date and circumstances of Bhaskaravarman's death are unknown; his reign likely ended on ~650 CE.

== Post-death events ==
Historian Kanaklal Barua suggests a revolt by the Mlechhas took place after Bhaskaravarman's death, leading Salastambha to seize the throne from Bhaskaravarman's successor Avantivarman.

== Legacy ==
The Assamese Calendar or Bhāskarābda, a Lunisolar calendar followed in the Indian state of Assam, is named after him. The calendar is counted from the date of his ascension to the throne of Kamarupa. It differs by 593 years from the Gregorian calendar.

Kumar Bhaskar Varma Sanskrit and Ancient Studies University in Nalbari, Assam, and Kumar Bhaskar Varma Setu over Brahmaputra river are named after him.

== See also ==
- Pala Dynasty
