= Kamarupa =

Kingdom based around Assam (350-1140)

Kingdom of Kamarupa
- 350–1140
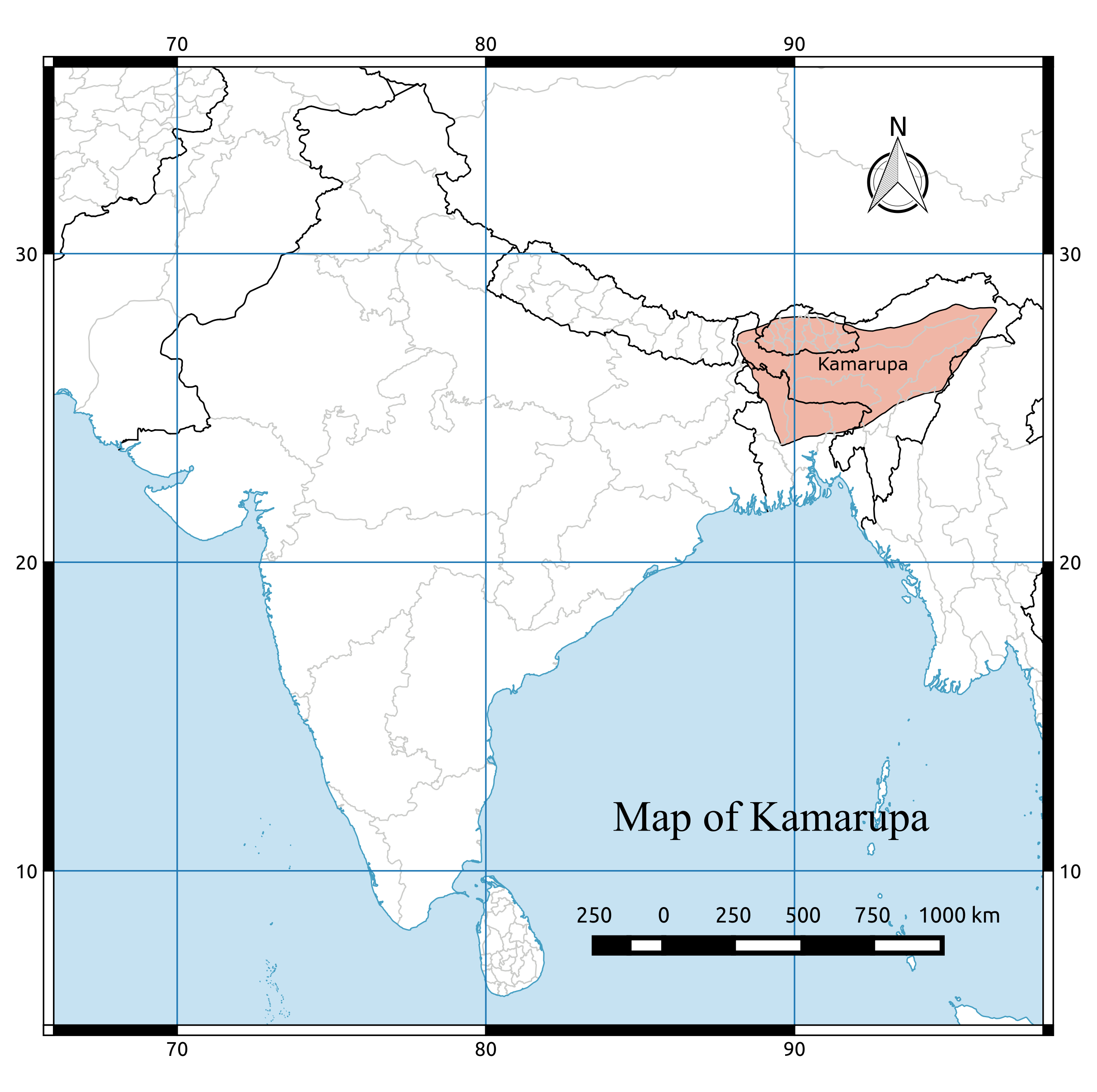
- The 7th and 8th century extent of Kamarupa kingdom, located on the eastern region of the Indian subcontinent, what is today modern-day Assam, Bengal and Bhutan. Kamarupa at its height covered the entire Brahmaputra Valley, parts of North Bengal, Bhutan and northern part of Bangladesh, and at times portions of West Bengal and Bihar.
- Capital: Pragjyotishpura; Haruppeswara; Durjaya
- Common languages: Kamarupi Prakrit; Sanskrit, Austroasiatic, Tibeto-Burman
- Religion: Hinduism, Animism
- Government: Absolute monarchy
- Historical era: Classical India
  - Established: 350
  - Disestablished: 1140
Succeeded by
Ahom kingdom
Kamata kingdom
Kachari kingdom
Chutia Kingdom
Baro Bhuyans
- Today part of: India; Bhutan; Bangladesh; Nepal

Kamarupa (/ˈkɑːməˌruːpə/; also called Pragjyotisha or Pragjyotisha-Kamarupa), an early state during the Classical period on the Indian subcontinent, was (along with Davaka) the first historical kingdom of Assam. The Kamrupa word first appeared in the Samudragupta Allahabad Edict before that there is no mention of existence of this word.

Though Kamarupa prevailed from 350 to 1140 CE, Davaka was absorbed by Kamarupa in the 5th century CE. Ruled by three dynasties from their capitals in present-day Guwahati, North Guwahati and Tezpur, Kamarupa at its height covered the entire Brahmaputra Valley, parts of North Bengal, Bhutan and northern part of Bangladesh, and at times portions of what is now West Bengal, Bihar and Sylhet.

Though the historical kingdom disappeared by the 12th century to be replaced by smaller political entities, the notion of Kamarupa persisted and ancient and medieval chroniclers continued to call a part of this kingdom Kamrup. In the 16th century the Ahom kingdom came into prominence and assumed for themselves the legacy of the ancient Kamarupa kingdom and aspired to extend their kingdom to the Karatoya River.

== Etymology ==
The earliest use of the name Kamarupa to denote the kingdom is from the 4th century, when Samudragupta's pillar inscription mentions it as a frontier kingdom. Kamarupa finds no mention in the epics Mahabharata or Ramayana and in the early and late Vedic, Buddhist, and Jain literatures the references to Kamarupa are not about a kingdom. An explanation of the name Kamarupa emerged first in the 10th-century Kalika Purana, six centuries after the first use of the name, as the kingdom where Kamadeva (Kama) regained his form (rupa).

The name Pragjyotisha, on the other hand, is mentioned in the epics, but it did not become associated with the Kamarupa kingdom till the 7th century when Bhaskaravarman associated his kingdom with the Pragjyotisha of the epics and traced his dynastic lineage to Bhagadatta and Naraka. In the 9th century, Pragjyotishpura is named as the legendary city from which Naraka reigned after his conquest of Kamarupa.

== History ==
=== Antecedents ===
"Kamarupa" is not included in the list of sixteen Mahajanapadas from the sixth to fourth centuries BCE; nor does it find any mention in the Ashokan records (3rd century BCE). The term "Kamarupa" first appears in the Allahabad pillar inscription of Samudragupta. During the 5th to 2nd century BCE, historical records mention the existence of a region called Lauhitya instead of Kamarupa, suggesting a potential absence of Brahmanical influence in the area during that period.

The 3rd–2nd century BCE Baudhayana Dharmasutra mentions Anga (eastern Bihar), Magadha (southern Bihar), Pundra (northern Bengal) and Vanga (eastern and southern Bengal), and prescribes that a Brahmin must undergo purification after visiting these regions. The absence of any mention of Kamarupa in such texts indicates that the region was beyond the ambit and recognition of Brahmanical culture during the second half of the first millennium BCE.

Early dated mentions come from the Periplus of the Erythraean Sea (1st century) and Ptolemy's Geographia (2nd century) which call the region Kirrhadia after the Kirata population. Arthashastra (early centuries of the Christian era) mentions "Lauhitya", which is identified with Brahmaputra valley by a later commentator. These early references speak about the economic activity of a tribal belt, and they do not mention any state.

The earliest mention of a kingdom comes from the 4th-century Allahabad inscription of Samudragupta that calls the kings of Kamarupa and Davaka frontier rulers (pratyanta nripati). The corpus of Kamarupa inscriptions left by the rulers of Kamarupa at various places in Assam and present-day Bangladesh are important sources of information. Nevertheless, local grants completely eschew the name Kamarupa; instead they use the name Pragjyotisha, with the kings called Pragjyotishadhipati.

The fragmentary Nagajari-Khanikargaon rock inscription, written in Sanskrit and probably a land grant, is dated to approximately the 5th century. It was found in Sarupathar in the Golaghat district of Assam. It supports the idea that Sanskritisation spread to the east very quickly. While this dating coincides with the time-span of the Varman dynasty, the inscription does not identify the state formation that issued the grant; the Varman dynasty may not have been responsible. One cannot completely "rule out the possibility of several simultaneous political powers in different sub-regional levels of north-eastern India around or even before the fourth century." Indeed, archaeological discoveries in the Doiyang Dhansiri Valley suggests that early state formation in the region may have begun before the second century.

=== Boundaries ===
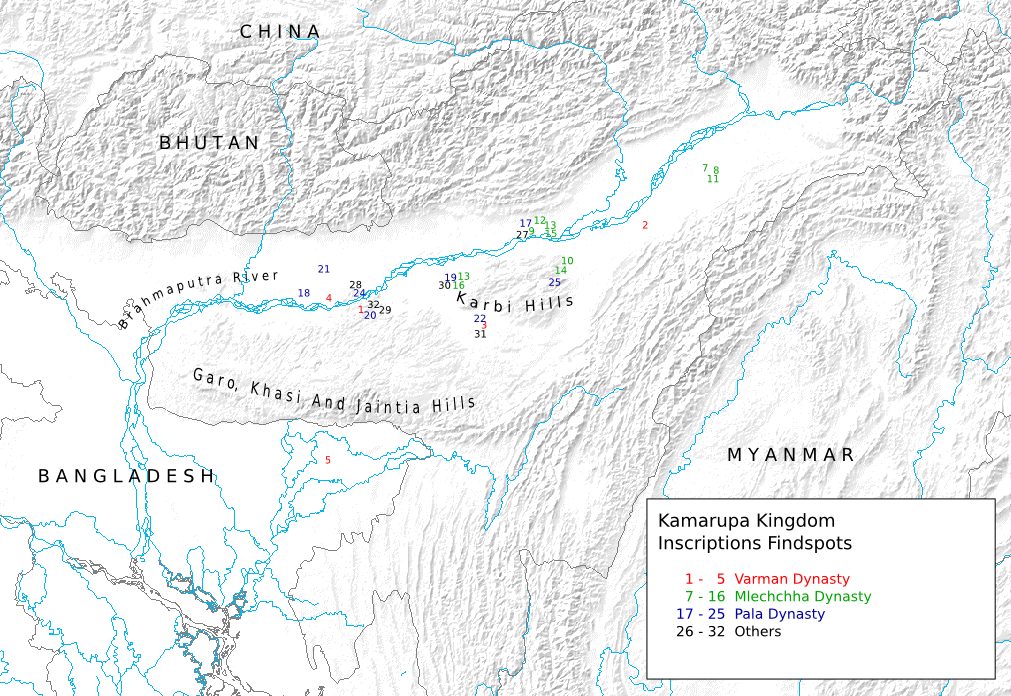
The findspots of inscriptions associated with the Kamarupa kingdom give an estimate of its geographical location and extent.

Over the course of its prevalence, the boundaries of Kamarupa had fluctuated. Nevertheless, the traditional boundary of Kamarupa is held by scholars to be—Karatoya River in the west, Sadiya in the east, between the Dhaka and Mymensingh districts in Bangladesh in the south, and Kanchenjanga in the north. The traditional boundaries are drawn from the textual references two of which are contemporneous—Xuanzang (7th century), and Kalika Purana (10th century)—and a late medieval source Yogini Tantra (16th century) though none of these claims are backed by any inscriptional record. Thus based on these references Kamarupa is considered to span the entire Brahmaputra Valley and Northeast India and at various times thought to include parts of present-day Bhutan, Bangladesh and Nepal.

==== Internal divisions ====
Kamarupa is not understood to have been a homogeneous unified entity. The Kalika Purana mentions a second eastern limit at Lalitakanta near Guwahati. Shin (2018) interprets this to mean that within Kamarupa the region between Karatoya and Lalitakanta was where sedentary life was the norm and the eastern region was the realm of non-sedentary society. These internal divisions came to be understood in terms of pithas, which were abodes of goddesses.

Various epigraphic records found scattered over the regions are used to postulate the size of the kingdom. The kingdom is believed to have broken up entirely by the 13th century into smaller kingdoms

=== Political history ===
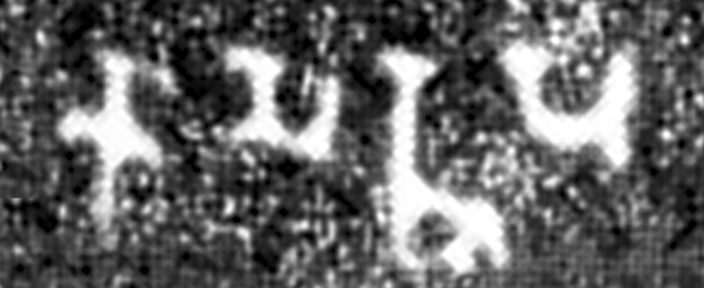
The name "Kāmarūpa" in later Brahmi script, in the Allahabad Pillar inscription of Samudragupta (350-375 CE).

Kamarupa, first mentioned on Samudragupta's Allahabad rock pillar as a frontier kingdom, began as a subordinate but sovereign ally of the Gupta Empire around present-day Guwahati in the 4th century:

It finds mention along with Davaka, a kingdom to the east of Kamarupa in the Kapili river valley in present-day Nagaon district, but which is never mentioned again as an independent political entity in later historical records. Kamarupa, which was probably one among many such state structures, grew territorially to encompass the entire Brahmaputra valley and beyond. As the Gupta Empire weakened, the Varmans, of indigenous origin, began asserting themselves politically by performing horse sacrifices and culturally by claiming semi-divine origins. Under the rule of Bhaskaravarman Kamarupa reached its political zenith and the lineage of the Varmans from Narakasura, a demon, became a fixed tradition. The Mlechchha dynasty, another set of indigenous rulers and the Pala dynasty (Kamarupa) that followed, too asserted political legitimacy by asserting descendancy from Narakasura.

==== Varman dynasty (c. 350 – c. 650) ====
South Asian polities c. 350 CE.

Pushyavarman (350–374) established the Varman Dynasty, by fighting many enemies from within and without his kingdom; but his son Samudravarman (374–398), named after Samudragupta, was accepted as an overlord by many local rulers. Nevertheless, subsequent kings continued their attempts to stabilise and expand the kingdom. Kalyanavarman (422–446) occupied Davaka and Mahendravarman (470–494) further eastern areas. Narayanavarma (494–518) and his son Bhutivarman (518–542) offered the ashwamedha (horse sacrifice); and as the Nidhanpur inscription of Bhaskarvarman avers, these expansions included the region of Chandrapuri visaya, identified with present-day Sylhet Division. Thus, the small but powerful kingdom that Pushyavarman established grew in fits and starts over many generations of kings and expanded to include adjoining possibly smaller kingdoms and parts of Bangladesh.

After the initial expansion till the beginning of Bhutivarman's reign, the kingdom came under attack from Yasodharman (525–535) of Malwa, the first major assault from the west. Though it is unclear what the effect of this invasion was on the kingdom; that Bhutivarman's grandson, Sthitavarman (566–590), enjoyed victories over the Gauda Kingdom of Karnasuvarna and performed two aswamedha ceremonies suggests that the Kamarupa kingdom had recovered nearly in full. His son, Susthitavarman (590–600) came under the attack of Mahasenagupta of East Malwa. These back and forth invasions were a result of a system of alliances that pitted the Kamarupa kings (allied to the Maukharis) against the Gaur kings of Bengal (allied with the East Malwa kings). Susthitavarman died as the Gaur invasion was on, and his two sons, Suprathisthitavarman and Bhaskarvarman fought against an elephant force and were captured and taken to Gaur. They were able to regain their kingdom due probably to a promise of allegiance. Suprathisthitavarman's reign is given as 595–600, a very short period, at the end of which he died without an heir. Supratisthitavarman was succeeded by his brother, Bhaskarvarman (600–650), the most illustrious of the Varman kings who succeeded in turning his kingdom and invading the very kingdom that had taken him captive. Bhaskarvarman had become strong enough to offer his alliance with Harshavardhana just as the Thanesar king ascended the throne in 606 after the murder of his brother, the previous king, by Shashanka of Gaur. Harshavardhana finally took control over the kingless Maukhari kingdom and moved his capital to Kanauj. The alliance between Harshavardhana and Bhaskarvarman squeezed Shashanka from either side and reduced his kingdom, though it is unclear whether this alliance resulted in his complete defeat. Nevertheless, Bhaskarvarman did issue the Nidhanpur copper-plate inscription from his victory camp in the Gaur capital Karnasuvarna (present-day Murshidabad, West Bengal) to replace a grant issued earlier by Bhutivarman for a settlement in the Sylhet region of present-day Bangladesh.

==== Mlechchha dynasty (c. 655 – c. 900 CE) ====
After the death of Bhaskaravarman without an heir and a subsequent period of civil and political turmoil, the kingdom passed into the hands of Salasthambha (r. 655–670), possibly a former local governor and a member of an aboriginal group referred to as the Mlechchhas. This dynasty also claimed descent from the Naraka dynasty, although it had no dynastic ties to the preceding Varman dynasty.

The capital of the Mlechchha dynasty was established at Haruppeshvara, now identified with modern Dah Parbatiya near Tezpur. During this period, the kingdom developed feudal characteristics, with political authority distributed between the king and subordinate rulers titled mahasamanta and samanta, who exercised considerable autonomy. The last known ruler of this dynasty was Tyāgasimha (r. 890–900).

==== Pala dynasty (c. 900 – c. 1100) ====
After the death of Tyāgasimha without an heir, a member of the Bhauma family, Brahma Pala (r. 900–920), was elected as king by the ruling chieftains—similar to how Gopala I of the Pala Empire of Bengal had been elected. The original capital of this dynasty was Hadapeshvara, which was later shifted to Durjaya by Ratna Pala (r. 920–960), near modern-day Guwahati. The most prominent ruler of the dynasty was Dharma Pala (r. 1035–1060), who established his capital at Kamarupanagara, now identified with North Guwahati. The last known ruler of this line was Jaya Pala (r. 1075–1100).

During this period, Kamarupa faced external invasions, and its western territories were conquered by Ramapala of the Pala Empire of Bengal.

=== Breakup and End of Kamarupa ===
Western Kamarupa
Ramapala could not keep control for long, and Timgyadeva (1110–1126) ruled western Kamarupa independently for some time. His son Kumarapala sent Vaidyadeva against Timgyadeva who installed himself at Hamshkonchi in the Kamrup region. Though Vaidyadeva maintained friendly relationships with Kumarapala, he styled himself after the Kamarupa kings issuing grants under the elephant seal of erstwhile Kamarupa kings and assuming the title of Maharajadhiraja, though he did not call himself Pragjyotisadhipati like the Kamarupa kings did. He controlled a portion of Kamrup, Goalpara and North Bengal but not Kamarupanagara, the seat of the last Kamarupa kings.

Central Kamarupa
It is estimated that with the withering away of the Kamarupa kingdom, parts of Kamrup, Darrang and Sonitpur districts on the north bank of the Brahmaputra River came under the control of one Bhaskara. A single inscription (1185) gives a list of four rulers that have been called the Lunar dynasty—Bhaskara, Rayarideva, Udayakarna and Vallabhadeva—with their reign dated to 1120–1200.

Southern Kamarupa
In the Sylhet region, there emerged rulers called Kharabana, Gokuladeva, Narayana and Kesavadeva.

Kamarupa Proper
Kamarupa proper was confined to the south bank of Brahmaputra, with the power center still at Kamarupanagara, with multiple rulers associated with it: Samudrapala and Sandhya.

In 1206 the Turko Afghan Bakhtiyar Khalji passed through Kamarupa against Tibet which ended in disaster, the first of many Turko-Afghan invasions. The ruler of Kamarupa at this point is sometimes identified with the son of Vallabhadeva of the Lunar dynasty. The king of Kamrupa withstood invasions (1226–27) from Ghiyasuddin Iwaj Shah of Gauda who retreated back to his capital to defend it from Nasiruddin Mahmud but was defeated, captured and killed in 1228. Nasir-ud-din installed a tributary king but after his death in 1229 the control of Kamarupa lapsed back to local rulers.

==== Beginning of Kamata ====
From among the local rulers, there emerged a strong ruler named Sandhya (c. 1250–1270), the Rai of Kamrup, with his capital at Kamarupanagara, the seat of the last Pala kings. Malik Ikhtiyaruddin Iuzbak, a governor of Gaur for the Mamluk rulers of Delhi, attempted an invasive attack on Sandhya's domain in 1257; and Sandhya, with the help of the spring floods that same year, captured and killed the Sultan. Subsequent to this attack, Sandhya moved his capital from Kamarupanagara to Kamatapur (North Bengal) and established a new kingdom, that came to be called Kamata.

At that time, western Kamarupa was the domain of the Koch and Mech peoples. In other parts of the erstwhile Kamarupa the Kachari kingdom (central Assam, South bank), Baro Bhuyans (central Assam, North bank), and the Chutiya kingdom (east) were emerging. The Ahoms, who would establish a strong and independent kingdom later, began building their state structures in the region between the Kachari and the Chutiya kingdoms in 1228.

== State ==
The extent of state structures can be culled from the numerous Kamarupa inscriptions left behind by the Kamarupa kings as well as accounts left by travellers such as those from Xuanzang. Governance followed the classical saptanga structure of state.

Kings and courts: The king was considered to be of divine origin. Succession was primogeniture, but two major breaks resulted in different dynasties. In the second, the high officials of the state elected a king, Brahmapala, after the previous king died without leaving an heir. The royal court consisted of a Rajaguru, poets, learned men and physicians. Different epigraphic records mention different officials of the palace: Mahavaradhipati, Mahapratihara, Mahallakapraudhika, etc.

Council of Ministers: The king was advised by a council of ministers (Mantriparisada), and Xuanzang mentions a meeting Bhaskaravarman had with his ministers. According to the Kamauli grant, these positions were filled by Brahmanas and were hereditary. State functions were specialised and there were different groups of officers looking after different departments.

Revenue: Land revenue (kara) was collected by special tax-collectors from cultivators. Cultivators who had no proprietary rights on the lands they tilled paid uparikara. Duties (sulka) were collected by toll collectors (Kaibarta) from merchants who plied keeled boats. The state maintained a monopoly on copper mines (kamalakara). The state maintained its stores and treasury via officials: Bhandagaradhikrita and Koshthagarika.

Grants: The king occasionally gave Brahmanas grants (brahmadeya), which consisted generally of villages, water resources, wastelands etc. (agraharas). Such grants conferred on the grantee the right to collect revenue and the right to be free of any regular tax himself and immunity from other harassments. Sometimes, the Brahmanas were relocated from North India, with a view to establish varnashramdharma. Nevertheless, the existence of donees indicate the existence of a feudal class. Grants made to temples and religious institutions were called dharmottara and devottara respectively.

Land survey: The land was surveyed and classified. Arable lands (kshetra) were held individually or by families, whereas wastelands (khila) and forests were held collectively. There were lands called bhucchidranyaya that were left unsurveyed by the state on which no tax was levied.

Administration: The entire kingdom was divided into a hierarchy of administrative divisions. From the highest to the lowest, they were bhukti, mandala, vishaya, pura (towns), agrahara (collection of villages) and grama (village). These units were administered by headed by rajanya, rajavallabha, vishayapati etc. Some other offices were nyayakaranika, vyavaharika, kayastha etc., led by the adhikara. They dispensed judicial duties too, though the ultimate authority lay with the king. Law enforcement and punishments were made by officers called dandika, (magistrate) and dandapashika (one who executed the orders of a dandika).

== See also ==
- Kamata kingdom
- Kamrup (disambiguation)
- History of Assam
