= People of Assam =

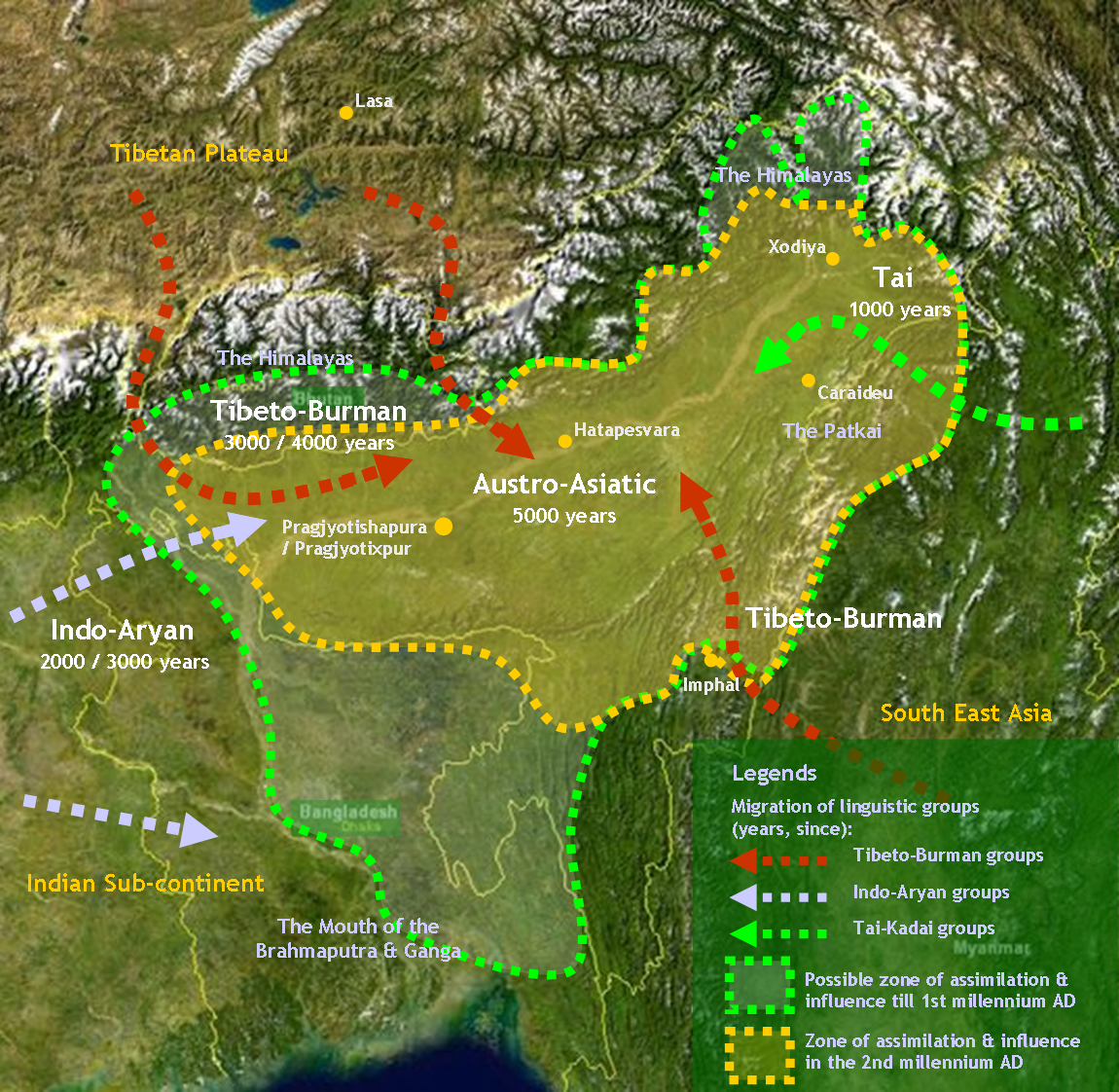
- Peoples populating Assam

Total population
- 31,169,272 (2011)

Regions with significant populations
- India: 31,169,272

Languages
- See Languages of Assam

Religion
- Majority Hinduism • Minorities include Traditional, Panentheistic • Islam • Christianity

The People of Assam inhabit a multi-ethnic, multi-linguistic and multi-religious society. They speak languages that belong to four main language groups: Tibeto-Burman, Indo-Aryan, Tai-Kadai, and Austroasiatic. The large number of ethnic and linguistic groups, the population composition, and the peopling process in the state has led to it being called an "India in miniature".

The peopling of Assam was understood in terms of racial types based on physical features, types that were drawn by colonial administrator Risley. These classifications are now considered to have little validity, and they yield inconsistent results; the current understanding is based on ethnolinguistic groups and in consonance with genetic studies.

== Peopling of Assam ==
Geographically Assam, in the middle of Northeast India, contains fertile river valleys surrounded and interspersed by mountains and hills. It is accessible from Tibet in the north (via Bum La, Se La, Tunga), across the Patkai in the Southeast (via Diphu, Kumjawng, Hpungan, Chaukam, Pangsau, More-Tamu) and from Burma across the Arakan Yoma (via An, Taungup). These passes have been gateways for migration routes from Tibet, Southeastern China and Myanmar. In the west both the Brahmaputra Valley and the Barak Valley open widely to the Gangetic plains. Assam has been populated via all these accessible points in the past. It has been estimated that there were eleven major waves and streams of ethnolinguistic migrations across these points over time. In recent years, a multidisciplinary approach using archaeological, historical linguistic and genetic data has been used to reconstruct population history.

There is no evidence in Assam and Northeast India of early hominid dispersal. The presence of a Paleolithic culture is contested. An early report of the presence of Dravidian is also not supported. The earliest culture in Assam is Neolithic; there is no evidence of Chalcolithic culture either in the Brahmaputra valley or in the surrounding hills; and state formation began only from middle of 1st millennium CE.

=== Prehistoric ===
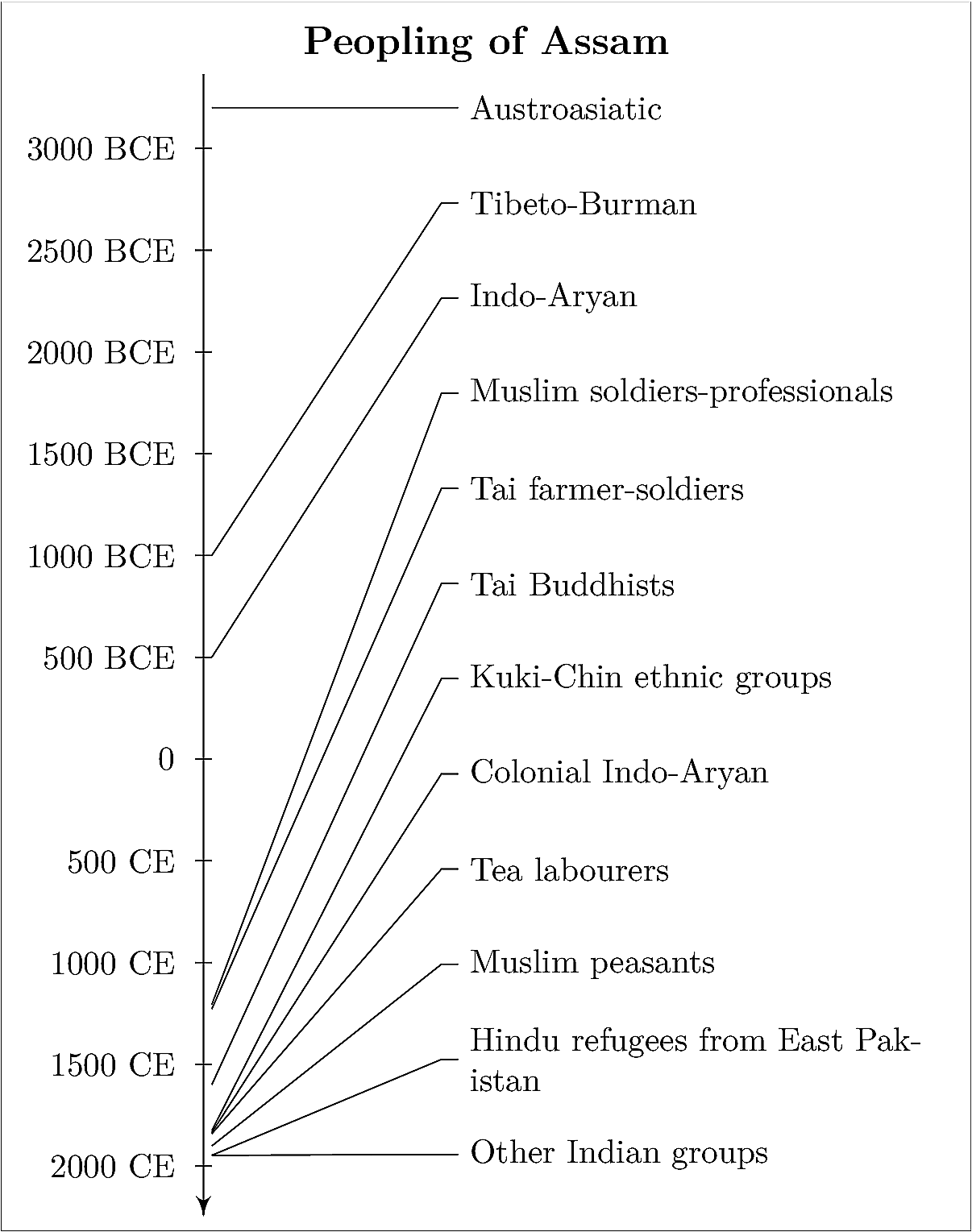
Taher (1993) identifies eleven waves and streams of immigration. Recent scholarship identifies additional immigration of other Indian groups in the post Independence period with significant demographic, political and social impact. The first three waves/streams immigrated in prehistoric times and are estimates: the Austroasiatic estimate is the expected period from genetic studies; the Tibeto-Burman is the lower limit from linguistic and other estimates; and the Indo-Aryan is the upper limit from paleographic estimates. The rest of the immigration took place in the medieval, and Colonial and post-Colonial times in Assam.

The archaeological sites of Sarutaru in Kamrup and Daojali Hading in Dima Hasao district display Neolithic cultures. Some other Neolithic sites in Northeast include those in Arunachal Pradesh, Sadiya, Dibrugarh, Lakhimpur, Nagaon, Naga Hills, Karbi Anglong,‌ Kamrup, Garo and Khasi hills of Meghalaya, etc. The Neolithic culture discovered in Assam has East and Southeast Asian affinities of the Hoabinhian tradition.

It had been suggested by linguists and ethnologists more than a hundred years ago that Austroasiatic speakers preceded Tibeto-Burman speakers—and the latest findings from genetic and linguistic studies support the early claim and suggest mechanisms how a section of the Austroasiatic speakers had shifted to Tibeto-Burman.

==== Austroasiatic ====
The earliest inhabitants of Assam are estimated to be late Neolithic Austroasiatic peoples who came from Southeast Asia. Genetic studies on O2a1‐M95 Y-chromosomal haplogroup, which has been associated with Austroasiatic speakers in India, show that the expansion of this haplogroup in northeast India occurred more than five thousand years ago. Some linguistic models indicate that the Austroasiatic peoples likely reached the region bringing with it an aquatic culture. Historians too have noted that dry rice cultivation reached Assam from Southeast Asia. Though some authors have suggested that the Brahmaputra valley may have been a center of dispersal of the Austroasiatic languages, this has been refuted by others.

They are expected to have settled in the foothills bordering the Brahmaputra Valley, to be either absorbed or pushed to the hills by subsequent migrants. The Austroasiatic remnant today are represented by the Khasi and Pnar peoples in neighbouring Meghalaya; and who are also present in Assam's Karbi Anglong and Dima Hasao districts that adjoin Meghalaya, and who have traditions placing them in the Brahmaputra valley. It is significant that in the context of the discontinuity in mtDNA in south asian and southeast asian populations the Khasi people have an equal admixture (40% S Asian and 39% SE Asian) of south/east Asian mtDNA as opposed to the Munda peoples (the Austroasiatic speakers in eastern India) who have predominantly south Asian mtDNA (75% S Asian and 0% SE Asian).

Jaquesson (2017) suggests that the Garo, Rabha, and some Koch peoples carry linguistic and social traces of past Austroasiatic peoples.

==== Tibeto-Burman ====
The second group of people to reach Assam are considered to be speakers of Tibeto-Burman languages. The first Tibeto-Burman speakers started coming into Assam some time before three thousand years ago from the north and the east. And they have continued coming into Assam till the present times. It is indicated that this population could be associated with the O-M134 y-chromosome haplogroup. There is widespread agreement among linguists and ethnographers that the Tibeto-Burmans migrated into an already settled region, which is consistent with genetics studies. They are today represented by the Bodo-Kacharis, the Karbi and the Mising; the Monpas and Sherdukpens; and Naga peoples. Over time, two distinct Tibeto-Burman linguistic regions emerged in northeast India—(1) highlands surrounding the Brahmaputra valley that is predominantly Tibeto-Burman with great diversity, and (2) plains where there are fewer but fairly homogenised Tibeto-Burman languages spread over a much larger area and in contact with Indo-Aryan and other language families.

DeLancey (2012) suggests that the Boro-Garo languages, the most widespread group of Tibeto-Burman languages in the plains, have a comparatively transparent grammar and an innovative morphology which indicates that proto-Boro-Garo must have emerged from a creolised lingua franca which is comparable to the case of Nagamese, during a time when it was being used by non-native speakers. A section of these Tibeto-Burman speakers could have been native Austroasiatic speakers, as suggested by some genetic studies on present-day Tibeto-Burman peoples of northeast India. It is expected that the Tibeto-Burman peoples were not as numerous as the indigenous Austroasiatic population, and the replacement was of languages and not peoples. The arrival of the Indo-Aryans and the expansion of the Kamarupa kingdom over the entire Brahmaputra valley created the conditions for the creolisation and development of proto-Boro-Garo lingua franca.

Medieval historical sources suggest that the Bodo-Kacharis were adept at gravitational irrigation, and though they were immersed in ahu rice culture some of them raised a wet rice called kharma ahu that was irrigated but not necessarily transplanted. These irrigation systems continued to be used by Austroasiatic and Tibeto-Burman groups in modern times. In this context, it is significant that most river names in Assam such as Dibang, Dihang, Doyang, start with Di-, (water in Tibeto-Burman) and end in -ong (water in Austric languages).

Eye witness accounts of the Austroasiatic and Tibeto-Burman peoples come from the Periplus of the Erythraean Sea (1st century CE) and Ptolemy's Geography (2nd century CE) that call the land Kirrhadia after the Indo-Aryan name for the non-Indo-Aryan Kirata people who were the source of Malabathrum, so priced in the classical world.

==== Indo-Aryan ====
The Indo-Aryan migration to Assam that began in the first millennium BCE is the third stream. Based on paleographic evidence Indo-Aryans spread into Assam early but it cannot be pushed beyond the 5th century BCE. The early Indo-Aryans were cultivators who brought with them the technology of wet rice (sali) cultivation, the plough, and cattle. The earliest direct epigraphic evidence of Indo-Aryans in Assam comes from the 5th-century CE Umachal and Nagajari-Khanikargaon rock inscriptions, written in the Indo-Aryan Sanskrit language. When Indo-Aryan speakers entered the Brahmaputra valley, Austroasiatic languages had not yet been entirely replaced by the Tibeto-Burman languages, since an Austroasiatic substratum in the later-day Assamese language that emerged from the earlier Indo-Aryan vernacular indicates that Austroasiatic languages were present at least till the 4th- and 5th centuries CE.

The presence of Indo-Aryans in the Brahmaputra Valley triggered its historical period with the establishment of the Kamarupa kingdom. The kings of this kingdom were originally non-Indo-Aryan who were sanskritised, and who encouraged immigration and settlements of Indo-Aryans as landlords of already settled cultivators. The land grants were written in Sanskrit, but the presence of Austroasiatic, Tibeto-Burman and vernacular Indo-Aryan words and formations in these grants indicated the presence of these languages. In the period when Indo-Aryan settlements were being created, Kamarupa likely constituted urban centers along the Brahmaputra River in which a precursor of the Assamese language was spoken with Austroasiatic and Tibeto-Burman communities everywhere else. Some of these centers were in Goalpara, Guwahati, Tezpur, Nagaon and Doyang-Dhansiri regions, where sanskritisation of the non-Indo-Aryan communities occurred. Sanskritisation was a process that occurred simultaneously with "deshification" (or localisation) of the Indo-Aryan communities in Assam.

=== Medieval ===
==== Muslim soldier-professionals ====
The fourth stream of new arrivals were Muslim personnel of the army of Muhammad Bin Bakhtiyar Khalji left back after his disastrous Tibet expeditions. Subsequently called Goria (from Gaur), they married local women, adopted local customs, but maintained their religion. This army was able to convert a Mech chief, called Ali Mech, which was the beginning of a limited number of local people who converted to the Islamic faith—later converts from the Koch, Mech and other ethnic groups came to be called Desi. In the 16th century yet another army from Bengal had to leave behind their soldiers—they too married local women and came to be called Moria. These populations were joined by religious preceptors, the most famous of who was Azan Faqir, a sufi saint. The descendants of Azan Faqir are known as Sayed in Assam.

==== Tai farmer-soldiers ====
The fifth wave of immigrants were Tai Shan People, who entered Assam under the leadership of Sukaphaa from Hukawng Valley in Myanmar via Pangsau Pass in 1228 and settled between Buridihing and Dikhou rivers. Ahoms, as they came to be called, were primarily responsible for surface levelling the extensive undulating plains of eastern Assam, extending the human base of sali wet-rice culture to the peoples they encountered in the region, and for establishing the Ahom kingdom. They assimilated some of the Naga, Moran, Borahi, Chutiya and Dimasa peoples in a process of Ahomisation till they themselves began to be Hinduized from the mid-16th century onwards.

==== Tai Buddhists and Sikhs ====
The sixth stream of peoples between the 17th and 19th centuries, were Tai; but unlike the Ahoms who were animists when they arrived, the later-day Tais were Buddhists. Called Khamti, Khamyang, Aiton, Tai Phake and Turung peoples, they came from Upper Burma at different times, and settled is small groups in Upper Assam. This continued well into the colonial times. At the end of the Medieval period, a small contingent of Sikhs soldiers sent by Ranjit Singh arrived in Assam to participate in the Battle of Hadirachokey—the survivors settled in a few villages in Nagaon district, married into local communities and formed a distinct Assamese-Sikh community.

=== Colonial ===
==== Kuki-Chin ethnic groups ====
The seventh wave of people into Assam occurred soon after the beginning the colonial period in Assam after the First Anglo-Burmese War and the Treaty of Yandaboo in 1826—the political instability led to the immigration of Kachin and Kuki people from Upper Burma into Assam across the Patkai and Arakan Yoma. They constitute the Singphos in Upper Assam, and the Kuki-Chin tribes in Karbi Anglong, Dima Hasao and Barak Valley.

==== Tea Garden labourers ====
Following the establishment of the tea industry in Assam, and after the companies failed in harnessing the labour of the local Kachari, people from the Chotanagpur area of Bihar, northern and western Orissa, eastern Madhya Pradesh, and northern Andhra Pradesh belonging to Munda, Ho, Santal, Savara, Oraon, Gond and other ethnic groups were recruited for labour in the newly emerging tea estates. Individual tea planters began bringing in labour starting in 1841, and collectively after 1859 many of them forcibly, in inhuman conditions, to serve as indentured labourers. Even after the practice of recruiting from outside was banned in 1926 recruitment continued till 1960 when labour available in the tea estates became a surplus. This group of immigrants originally spoke many languages belonging to Dravidian, Indo-Aryan and Austroasiatic languages and many have adopted Assamese language and ways.

==== Colonial Indo-Aryan ====
British colonialism opened the borders of Assam, hitherto controlled tightly by the Ahom and Dimasa kingdoms, and established a new order causing a significant influx from Bengal, Rajasthan, North India and Nepal. Bengali Hindus filled most of the colonial administrative positions open to "natives"; and monopolised positions that colonialism opened up such as modern professional positions in the medical, legal, and teaching areas and middle-class positions in the railways and post-office. The Hindu Bengali became the model of social change in the 19th century—westernisation as well as sanskritisation became stronger with impacts on dress, hair-do, manners, culinary arts, and other forms of culture; the caste system, which was not too rigid earlier, became more rigid; sastric rituals presided over by brahmins became more common; etc.

Colonialism also germinated different industries and instituted a market economy in place of the corvee-labour-based non-monetized economy of the kingdoms it replaced. The opportunities for traders were filled mostly by Marwari traders (locally called keya) from Rajasthan, though there were Sindhis, Punjabi Sikhs and others in small numbers with no competition from the local population. In the 19th century the peasant economy was completely in their grip and Marwari traders also participated as bankers and commercial agents of the nascent Assam Tea industry. Though in numbers they were a small group the entire trade of the Assam valley by 1906 was the monopoly of this highly visible population. Marwari personalities such as Jyotiprasad Agarwala, Kamala Prasad Agarwala, Chandra Kumar Agarwala and others made significant contribution to Assamese literature, language and cinema. Jyotiprasad Agarwala is referred to as Rupkonwar (Prince of Beauty) and is also regarded as the Father of Assamese Cinema.

The British East India Company began recruiting Gorkha soldiers after the Anglo-Nepalese War (1814–1816); settlement of Gorkha retirees and their families in the then depopulated areas (following Moamoria rebellion and Burmese occupation) began in the 1830s—and from a few thousand in 1879 their population increased to more than twenty one thousand in 1901 in the Brahmaputra valley. In the first two decades of the 20th century the colonial government encouraged Newar and other ethnic non-Bahun Nepali communities to settle in Assam's excluded areas mostly as "professional" cattle grazers for an expanding revenue, feeding into the business of milk supply in the emerging urban markets. This population of Assam was joined by Gorkha security personnel from forces such as the Assam Rifles that stayed back after their retirement. This population became predominant in the lower hills.

==== Muslim cultivators ====
Muslim landless cultivators from Mymensingh in present-day Bangladesh, encouraged by the landlords of Goalpara and the British administration, began arriving in the late 19th century seeking land. The initial trickle showed dramatic increases in each succeeding decade after 1901—by 1911, the Mymensingh cultivators were joined by lesser numbers from Pabna, Bogra and Rangpur who settled in the Char lands of Goalpara and some beyond; by 1921 the immigrants were settled up to the central districts of Assam, mostly along the Brahmaputra though many had ventured further away, with some close to the Bhutan border; and by 1931 the increases have been so dramatic that even British officers began talking about demographic shifts. This group came to be called Miya and a large section of them had accepted the Assamese language as their mother tongue.

=== Post-Colonial ===
==== Hindus from East Pakistan ====
The Partition of India triggered an exodus of Bengali Hindu people mostly from Sylhet Division in East Pakistan to Assam, numbering between 700 and 800 thousands. This wave continued till the 1970s and then slowed down. Unlike the Muslim cultivator who came from Mymensingh and from the west seeking land, this group came in from the south and settled mostly around towns, service centers and railway stations.

==== Other Indian groups ====
Immigration of North Indian groups, especially from eastern Uttar Pradesh and Bihar, in the post-Independence period was particularly strong. Collectively called desuwali (a local corruption of deshwali referring to their homeland or desh), they came from marginal socioeconomic backgrounds and came as construction workers, handcart-pullers, rickshaw pullers, cobblers, barbers and eventually settled in Assam, usually in interior fallow lands—and many of them found reasonable successes in trade and commerce and have become politically assertive. Other smaller groups include immigrants from Punjab who participated in trade and commerce; and people from Kerala who participated in education, and para-medical services (such as nursing).

== Ethnic groups ==
Assam is acknowledged as a settling land for many different cultures. Tribal groupings migrated to the soils of Assam from diverse directions, as the territory was linked to a number of states and many different countries throughout history. Austro-Asiatics, Tibeto-Burmans, and Indo-Aryans are historically the most important and oldest traditional groups to have arrived in Assam, and to this day, they remain essential elements of the "Assamese Diaspora". The greater Bodo-Kachari group forms a major part of Assam, encompassing 19 major tribes of both the plains and hills.

In the 13th century CE, Tai peoples arrived in the Brahmaputra Valley of Assam. Their descendants became the Tai Ahoms, who rose as a dominant group in the region with the Ahom kingdom (c. 13th to 19th centuries CE). They are the ethnic group with which Upper Assam Bodo-Kachari groups like the Chutias, Morans and Borahis are associated.

Along with the Tai Ahoms, other prominent groups ruled parts of the Assam Valley during the medieval period, notably the Chutias, Kochs, and Dimasas. The Chutia kingdom ruled the eastern Assam from 1187 to 1523, the Koch kingdom ruled Lower Assam from 1515 to 1949, and the Dimasa kingdom ruled southern Assam from the 13th century to 1854.

The Bodo tribe, also known as the Boro, are the largest modern-day ethnolinguistic group in the state of Assam. They are concentrated in northern Assam, in Bodoland. They speak the Bodo language, one of the 22 constitutional languages of India.

Assam has always been a historically tribal state, and many of the indigenous Assamese communities today retain a tribal structure. Many others, now considered non-tribal populations of Assam, were slowly converted from a tribal to a caste system through Sanskritisation.

Several indigenous tribes like the Moran, Chutia, Motok, Tai Ahoms and Koch, as well as non-indigenous groups like the Tea-tribes have applied for Scheduled Tribe (ST) status, a form of affirmative action laid out in the Indian Constitution for socioeconomically disadvantaged tribes. If accepted, this could make Assam a predominantly tribal state, having wide geo-political ramifications.

== See also ==
- Assamese people
- Meitei people in Assam

== Bibliography ==
- Arunkumar, Ganesh Prasad; et al. (2015). "A late Neolithic expansion of Y chromosomal haplogroup O2a1-M95 from east to west". Journal of Systematics and Evolution. 53 (6): 546–560. Bibcode:2015JSyEv..53..546A. doi:10.1111/jse.12147. S2CID 83103649.
- Bareh, Hamlet (1987), "Khasi-Jaintia State Formation", in Sinha, Surajit (ed.), Tribal Polities and State Systems in Pre-colonial Eastern and North Eastern India, New Delhi: K P Bagchi & Company, pp. 261–306
- Baruah, Sanjib (1999). India Against Itself: Assam and the Politics of Nationality. Oxford University Press. ISBN 978-0-19-565840-8.
- Boruah, Nirode (2008). "Sanskritization and Detribalization in Early Assam: Some Geographical Aspects". Proceedings of the Indian History Congress. 69: 167–179. JSTOR 44147178.
- Chaubey, Gyaneshwar; et al. (2011). "Population Genetic Structure in Indian Austroasiatic Speakers: The Role of Landscape Barriers and Sex-Specific Admixture". Mol. Biol. Evol. 28 (2): 1013–1024. doi:10.1093/molbev/msq288. PMC 3355372. PMID 20978040.
- DeLancey, Scott (2012). Hyslop, Gwendolyn; Morey, Stephen; w. Post, Mark (eds.). "On the Origins of Bodo-Garo". Northeast Indian Linguistics. 4: 3–20. doi:10.1017/UPO9789382264521.003. ISBN 9789382264521.
- Devi, Chandam Victoria (2018). "Participatory Management of Irrigation System in North Eastern Region of India". International Journal of Rural Management. 14 (1): 69–79. doi:10.1177/0973005218765552. ISSN 0973-0052.
- Guha, Amalendu (2016) [1977]. Planter Raj to Swaraj (Anwesha ed.). Anwesha Publications. ISBN 978-81-89003-89-0.
- Guha, Amalendu (1984). "Pre-Ahom Roots and the Medieval State in Assam: A Reply". Social Scientist. 12 (6): 70–77. doi:10.2307/3517005. JSTOR 3517005.
- Guha, Amalendu (December 1983), "The Ahom Political System: An Enquiry into the State Formation Process in Medieval Assam (1228-1714)", Social Scientist, 11 (12): 3–34, doi:10.2307/3516963, JSTOR 3516963, archived from the original on 6 July 2023
- Guha, Amalendu (1982), "Medieval Economy of Assam", in Chaudhuri, Tapan; Habib, Irfan (eds.), The Cambridge Economic History of India, vol. 1, New Delhi: Cambridge University Press, pp. 478–505
- Hazarika, Manjil (2017). Prehistory and Archaeology of Northeast India. New Delhi: Oxford University Press. ISBN 978-0-19-947466-0.
- Hazarika, Manjil (2017a). "Ancient Population Movements in Northeast India: A Closer Look at the Ethnolinguistic Prehistory". Man in India. 95 (4): 231–266.
- Jaquesson, François (2017) [2006]. "The linguistic reconstruction of the past: The case of the Boro-Garo languages". Linguistics of the Tibeto-Burman Area. 40 (1). Translated by van Breugel, Seino: 90–122. doi:10.1075/ltba.40.1.04van.
- Post, Mark; Burling, Robbins (2017), The Tibeto-Burman Languages of Northeast India, Routledge, ISBN 978-1-138-78332-4
- Ramirez, Philippe (2014). People of the Margins: Across Ethnic Boundaries in North-East India. SPECTRUM PUBLICATIONS.
- Rau, Felix; Sidwell, Paul (2019). "The Munda Maritime Hypothesis". Journal of the Southeast Asian Linguistics Society. 12 (2): 35–57. hdl:10524/52454. ISSN 1836-6821.
- Sahoo, Sanghamitra; et al. (2006). "A prehistory of Indian Y chromosomes: Evaluating demic diffusion scenarios". Proceedings of the National Academy of Sciences of the United States of America. 103 (4): 843–848. Bibcode:2006PNAS..103..843S. doi:10.1073/pnas.0507714103. PMC 1347984. PMID 16415161.
- Sankalia, H D; Sharma, Sharma (1990), "The Prehistoric Age", in Barpujari, H K (ed.), The Comprehensive History of Assam, vol. I, Guwahati: Publication Board, Assam, pp. 25–43
- Sidwell, Paul; Blench, Roger (2011), "The Austroasiatic Urheimat: the Southeastern Riverine Hypothesis", in Enfield, N J (ed.), Dynamics of human diversity : the case of mainland Southeast Asia (PDF), Canberra: Pacific Linguistics, pp. 317–345
- Sidwell, Paul (28 January 2022). Alves, Mark; Sidwell, Paul (eds.). "Austroasiatic Dispersal: the AA "Water-World" Extended". Journal of the Southeast Asian Linguistics Society: Papers from the 30th Conference of the Southeast Asian Linguistics Society (2021). 15 (3): 95–111. doi:10.5281/zenodo.5773247. ISSN 1836-6821.
- Sharma, Chandan Kumar (2012). "The immigration issue in Assam and conflicts around it". Asian Ethnicity. 13 (3): 287–309. doi:10.1080/14631369.2012.676235. S2CID 144894999.
- Sharma, Jayeeta (2011). Empire's Garden: Assam and the making of India. Durham and London: Duke University Press. ISBN 978-0-8223-5049-1.
- Sharma, Mukunda Madhava (1978). Inscriptions of Ancient Assam. Guwahati, Assam: Gauhati University.
- Sharma, Santanu K; et al. (2013). "Prevalence of haemoglobin E among Assamese Sikh community". Current Science. 104 (8): 1012–1013. JSTOR 24092186.
- Sircar, D C (1990a), "Political History", in Barpujari, H K (ed.), The Comprehensive History of Assam, vol. I, Guwahati: Publication Board, Assam, pp. 94–171
- Sircar, D C (1990), "Pragjyotisha-Kamarupa", in Barpujari, H K (ed.), The Comprehensive History of Assam, vol. I, Guwahati: Publication Board, Assam, pp. 59–78
- Taher, Mohammad (1993), "The Peopling of Assam and contemporary social structure", in Ahmad, Aijazuddin (ed.), Social Structure and Regional Development, New Delhi: Rawat Publication, pp. 201–218
- Terwiel, B.J. (1996). "Recreating the Past: Revivalism in Northeastern India". Bijdragen tot de Taal-, Land- en Volkenkunde. 152 (2): 275–92. doi:10.1163/22134379-90003014. JSTOR 27864746.
- van Driem, G (2007). "The diversity of the Tibeto-Burman language family and the linguistic ancestry of Chinese". Bulletin of Chinese Linguistics. 1 (2): 211–270. doi:10.1163/2405478X-90000023.
- van Driem, George (2021). Ethnolinguistic Prehistory. Koninklijke Brill. ISBN 978-90-04-44836-0.
- Urban, Hugh B. (2011). "The Womb of Tantra: Goddesses, Tribals, and Kings in Assam". The Journal of Hindu Studies. 4 (3): 231–247. doi:10.1093/jhs/hir034.
