= Rahul =

- Gender: Male

Origin
- Origin: India
- Meaning: Conqueror of all miseries, Bondage, Traveler
- Region of origin: India

Rahul is a popular male name in India and may be derived from the name Rahula, the name given to the son of the Buddha according to certain Buddhist traditions. The name Rahula in turn is derived from the name Rahu, a Hindu mythological figure that causes eclipses. In some traditions, the name Rahula was bestowed on the Buddha's son, meaning either fetter, chain, or bond, representing his obstruction of the Buddha's Enlightenment, while other traditions claim that the name means eclipse or obstruction, and was given to him as he was born on the night of a lunar eclipse.

== People named Rahul ==
=== Arts ===
- Rahul Banerjee (actor) (born 1983), Indian Bengali actor
- Rahul Bhatt (born 1982), Indian fitness trainer and actor
- Rahul Bose (born 1967), Indian Bengali actor, director, screenwriter, social activist
- Rahul Deshpande (born 1979), Indian classical singer
- Rahul Dev (born 1968), Indian actor and model
- Rahul Dev Burman (1939–1994), Indian composer and music director
- Rahul Dholakia, Indian film director, producer, and screenwriter
- Rahul Khanna (born 1972), Indian Hindi actor
- Rahul Kohli (born 1985), English actor
- Rahul Madhav, Indian Malayalam actor
- Rahul Nambiar, Indian singer
- Rahul Pandey, Indian Bollywood musician
- Rahul Raj (born 1980), Indian composer
- Rahul Ram, Indian musician
- Rahul Ramakrishna (born 1991), Indian actor, writer and journalist
- Rahul Ravindran, Indian actor
- Rahul Rawail (born 1951), Indian film director
- Rahul Roy (born 1968), Indian Hindi actor, producer and model
- Rahul Vaidya (born 1987), Indian singer

=== Politics ===
- Rahul Daulatrao Aher (born 1975), Indian politician from Maharashtra
- Rahul Gandhi (born 1970), Indian politician
- Rahul Mahajan (politician) (born 1975), son of Late Pramod Mahajan, a prominent Indian politician
- Rahul Mamkootathil, Indian politician from Kerala

=== Science ===
- Rahul Mukerjee (born 1956), Indian academic and statistician
- Rahul Pandit (born 1956), Indian physicist
- Rahul Potluri (born 1983), Indian-British physician and researcher
- Rahul Sarpeshkar, American bio-engineer

=== Sports ===
- Rahul Banerjee (archer) (born 1986), Indian archer
- Rahul Bheke (born 1990), Indian footballer
- Rahul Chahar (born 1999), Indian cricketer
- Rahul Dravid (born 1973), Indian cricketer
- K. L. Rahul (born 1991), Indian cricketer
- Rahul Kanwat (born 1974), Indian cricketer
- Rahul Sanghvi (born 1974), Indian cricketer
- Rahul Yadav (cricketer) (born 1989), Indian cricketer
- Rahul KP (born 2000), Indian footballer

=== Other fields ===
- Rahul Bajaj (born 1980), industrialist
- Rahul Chandran (born 1976), policy analyst
- Rahul Easwar, Indian author and activist
- Rahul Ligma, fictional ex-employee of Twitter played by an amateur actor
- Rahul Mahajan (blogger), noted American blogger and author
- Rahul Roy (accountant) (1963–2009), Indian accountant
- Rahul Sankrityayan (1893–1963), Indian historian, religious scholar, philosopher, writer and polymath
- Rahul Sood (born 1973), Canadian business executive
- Rahul Yadav (born 1988), Indian entrepreneur

=== Multiple people ===
- Rahul Kumar (disambiguation), several people
- Rahul Prasad (disambiguation), several people
- Rahul Sharma (disambiguation), several people
- Rahul Singh (disambiguation), several people

== See also ==
- Raul, a given name in Romance languages
- Rahula (disambiguation)
- Raoul (disambiguation)
- Rasul (disambiguation)
