= History of Assam =

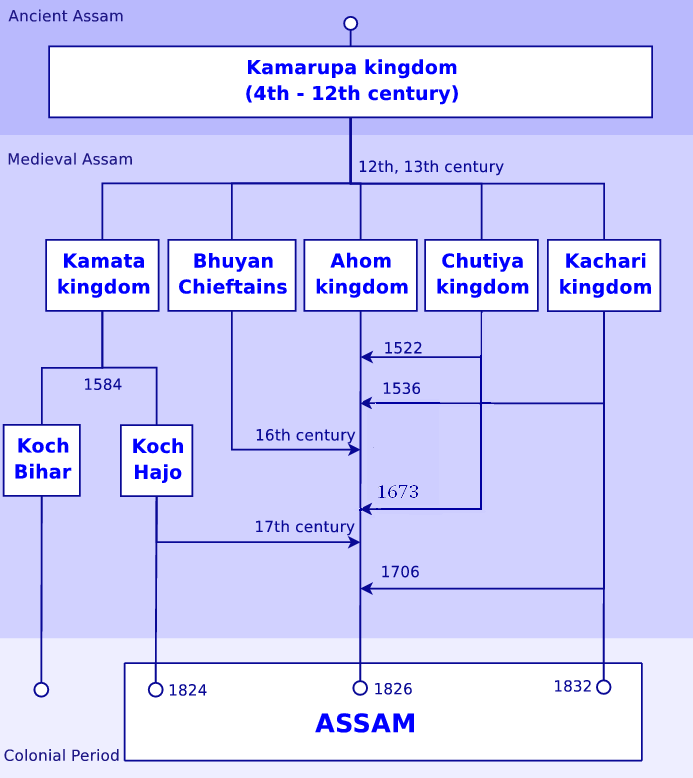
Major kingdoms of Assam

The history of Assam is the history of a confluence of people from the east, west, south and the north; the confluence of the Austroasiatic, Tibeto-Burman (Sino-Tibetan), Tai and Indo-Aryan cultures. Although invaded over the centuries, it was never a vassal or a colony to an external power until the third Burmese invasion in 1821, and, subsequently, the British ingress into Assam in 1824 during the First Anglo-Burmese War.

The Assamese history has been derived from multiple sources. The Ahom kingdom of medieval Assam maintained chronicles, called Buranjis, written in the Ahom and the Assamese languages. History of ancient Assam comes from a corpus of Kamarupa inscriptions on rock, copper plates, clay; royal grants, etc. that the Kamarupa kings issued during their reign. Evidence about the cultural history and socio-religious beliefs of the people of the region can also be derived from the Kalika Purana and the Yogini Tantra, both believed to be composed in this region around the early medieval and medieval times. The religious literature of the Neo-Vaishnavite movement introduced by Sankaradeva are other important primary sources for the region's history.

The history of Assam can be divided into four eras. The ancient era began in the 4th century with the mention of Kamarupa in Samudragupta's inscriptions on the Allahabad pillar and the establishment of the Kamarupa kingdom. The medieval era began with the attacks from the Bengal Sultanate, the first of which took place in 1206 by Bakhtiyar Khilji as mentioned in the Kanai-boroxiboa rock inscription, after the breakup of the ancient kingdom and the sprouting of medieval kingdoms and chieftain-ships in its place. The colonial era began with the establishment of British control after the Treaty of Yandaboo in 1826, and the post-colonial era began in 1947 after the Independence of India.

A common theme of Medieval kingship narratives in Assam is associated with shaktism and the Kamakhya temple.

== Prehistory ==
=== Paleolithic cultures ===
The earliest inhabitants of the region are assigned to the Middle Pleistocene period (781,000 to 126,000 years ago) in the Rongram valley of Garo Hills. The Paleolithic sites, which used handaxe-cleaver tools, have affinities to the Abbevillio-Acheulean culture. Other Paleolithic sites include those in the Daphabum area of Lohit district in Arunachal Pradesh which used stone tools from metamorphic rocks. The cave-based Paleolithic sites at Khangkhui in Ukhrul, Manipur, are placed in the Late Pleistocene period.

There exists evidence of a microlithic culture in the Rongram Valley of Garo Hills that lie between the Neolithic layers and virgin soil. The microliths here were made of dolerite, unlike those from the rest of India. Shreds of crude hand-made pottery indicate that the microlithic people were hunters and food-gatherers.

=== Neolithic cultures ===
Early Neolithic cultures based on the unifacially flaked hand-axe in the Garo hills have developed in line with the Hoabinhian culture, and it is conjectured that this region was the contact point for the Indian and the Southeast Asian cultures.

The Late Neolithic cultures have affinities with the spread of the Mon Khmer speaking people from Malaysia and the Ayeyarwady valley and late Neolithic developments in South China. Since these cultures have been dated to 4500–4000 BCE, the Assam sites are dated to approximately that period.

These Neolithic sites, though widely spread, are concentrated in the hills and high grounds, due possibly to the floods. These cultures performed shifting cultivation called jhum, which is still practiced by some communities in the region. Some typical sites are Daojali Hading in Dima Hasao, Sarutaru in Kamrup district and Selbagiri in the Garo Hills.

=== Metal age ===
There exists no archaeological evidence of Copper-Bronze or Iron Age culture in the region. This might seem like an impossibility given that corresponding cultures have been discovered in Bengal as well as Southeast Asia. It can only be conjectured that metal age sites in the region exist but have not yet been discovered.

=== Megalithic cultures ===
Though the metal age seems to be missing in Assam, the Iron Age Megalithic culture of South India finds an echo in the rich megalithic culture in the region, which begins to appear earlier than the late second millennium BCE, and which continues till today among the Khasi and the Naga people. The affinity is with Southeast Asia. The megalithic culture was the precursor of the fertility cult and the Saktism and the Vajrayana Buddhism that followed.

== Ancient Assam (350–1206) ==
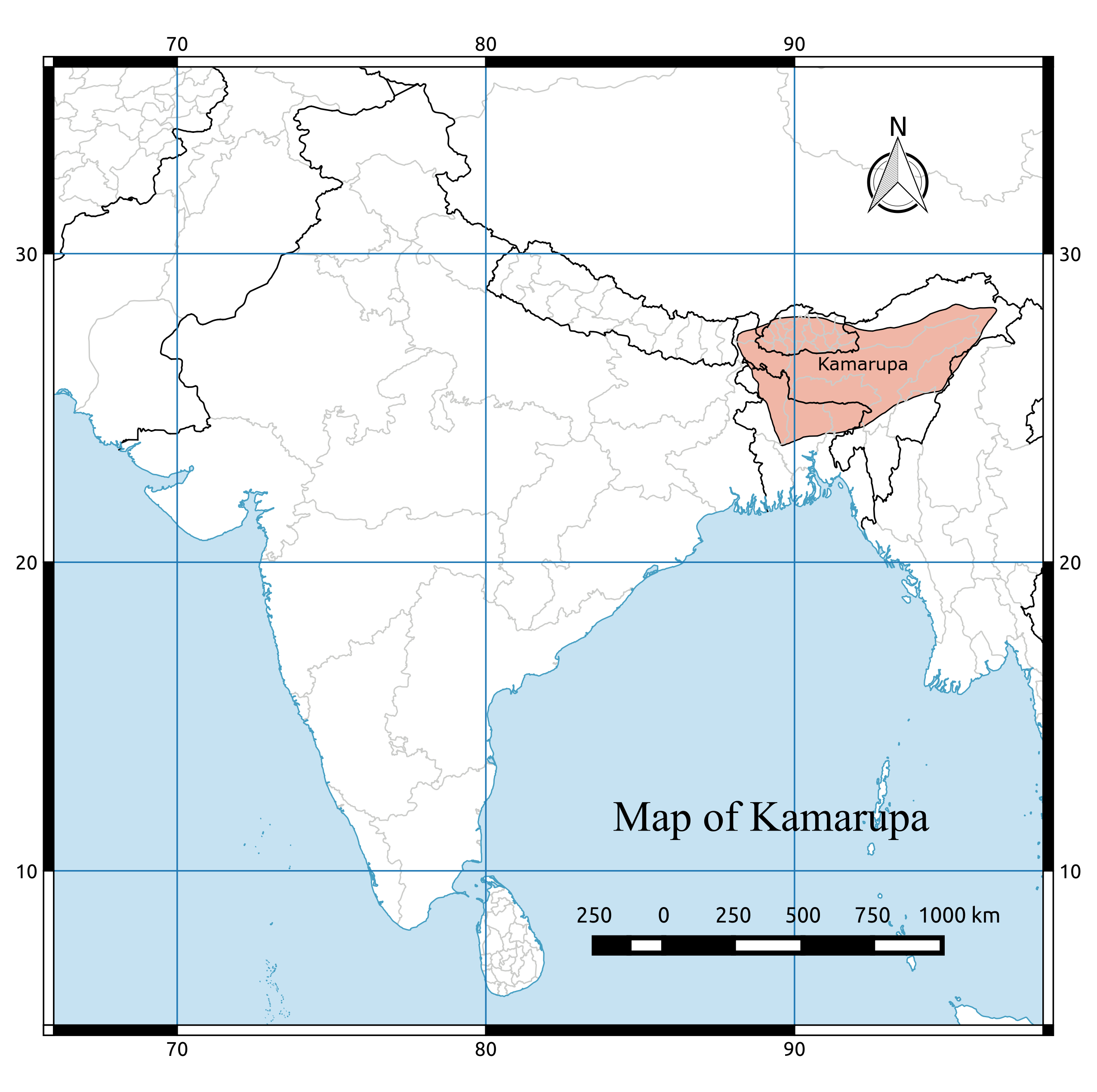
The traditional extent of the Kamarupa kingdom

The historical account of Assam begins with the establishment of Pushyavarman's Varman dynasty in the 4th century in the Kamarupa kingdom, which marks the beginning of Ancient Assam. The kingdom reached its traditional extent, from the Karatoya in the west to Sadiya in the east. This and the two succeeding dynasties drew their lineage from the mythical Narakasura.

The kingdom reached its zenith under Bhaskaravarman in the 7th century. Xuanzang visited his court and left behind a significant account. Bhaskaravarman died without leaving behind an issue and the control of the country passed to Salasthamba, who established the Mlechchha dynasty. After the fall of the Mlechchha dynasty in the late 9th century, a new ruler, Brahmapala was elected, who established the Pala dynasty. The last Pala king was removed by the Gaur king, Ramapala, in 1110. But the two subsequent kings, Timgyadeva and Vaidyadeva, though established by the Gaur kings, ruled mostly as independents and issued grants under the old Kamarupa seals. The fall of subsequent kings and the rise of individual kingdoms in the 12th century in place of the Kamarupa kingdom marked the end of the Kamarupa kingdom and the period of Ancient Assam.

== Medieval Assam (1206–1826) ==
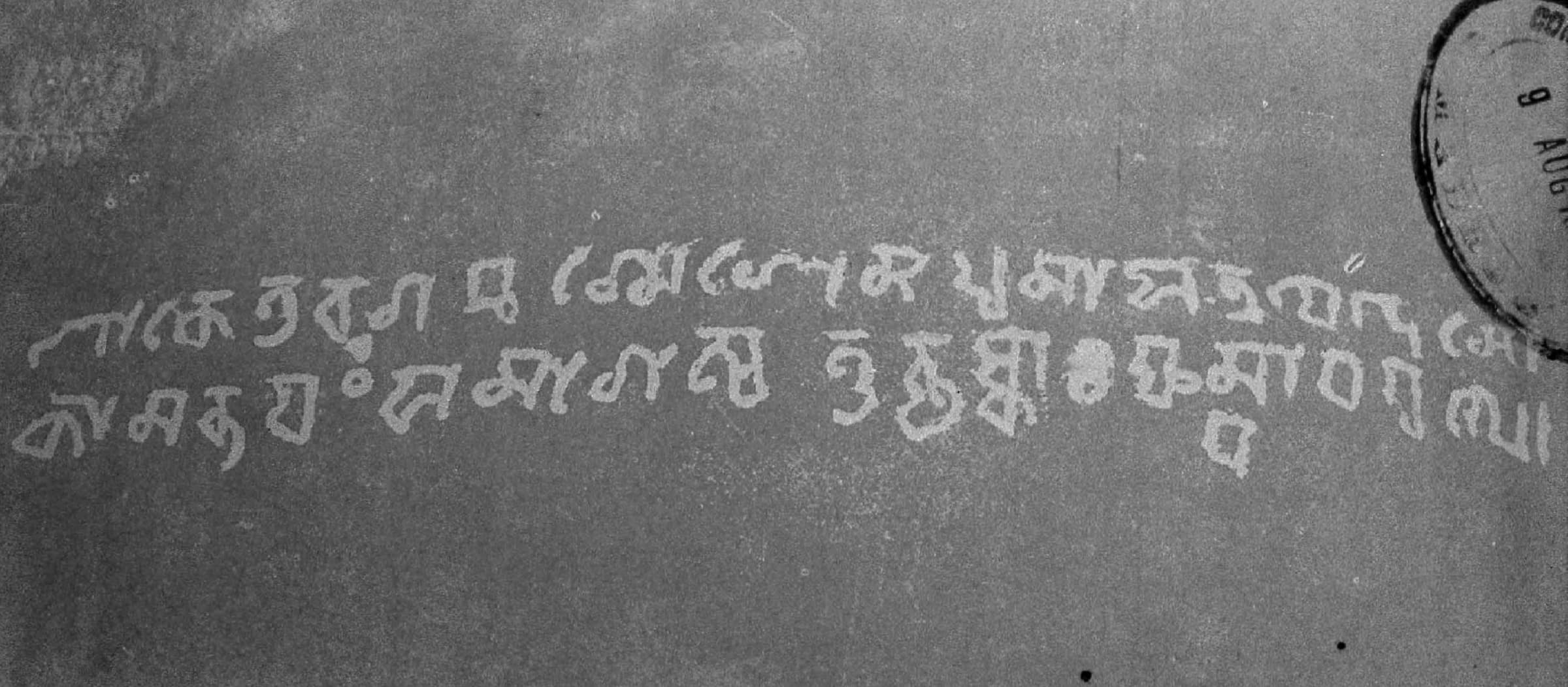
The medieval period in Assam begins with the "Kanai Baraxiboa" rock inscription of 1206. That year saw the first Muslim attack by Bakhtiyar Khilji

Ahom expansion in the Brahmaputra Valley and the change of polities.

In the middle of the 13th century, Sandhya, a king of Kamarupanagara, moved his capital to Kamatapur, and thus established the Kamata kingdom. on account of attacks by the Bengalis. The last of the Kamata kings, the Khens, were defeated by Alauddin Hussain Shah in 1498 and Kamatapur was annexed by Bengal Sultanate. But Hussein Shah and subsequent rulers could not consolidate their rule in the Kamata kingdom, mainly due to the revolt by the Bhuyan chieftains, a relic of the Kamarupa administration, and other local groups. Soon after in the beginning of the 16th century Vishwa Singha of the Koch tribe established the Koch dynasty in the Kamata kingdom. The Koch dynasty reached its peak under his sons, Nara Narayan and Chilarai.

In the eastern part of present Assam, the Kachari (south bank of river Brahmaputra, central Assam) and the Chutia (north and south bank of river Brahmaputra, eastern Assam) kingdoms arose, with some Bhuyan chiefs controlling the region just west of the Chutia kingdom. In the tract between the Kachari and the Chutia kingdoms, a Shan group, led by Sukaphaa, established the Ahom kingdom. The 16th century is crucial in the history of medieval period because of the consolidation of the Ahoms (who annexed the Chutia kingdom and pushed the Kachari kingdom away from central Assam) in the east, the Koch in the west and the growth of Ekasarana Dharma of Srimanta Sankardev. After the death of Nara Narayan of the Koch dynasty in the late 16th century, the Kamata kingdom broke into Koch Bihar in the west and Koch Hajo in the east. The rivalry between the two kingdoms resulted in the former allying with the Mughals and the latter with the Ahoms. Most of the 17th century saw the Ahom-Mughal conflicts, in which the Ahoms held the expansive Mughals at bay epitomized in the Battle of Saraighat of 1671, and which finally ended in 1682 with the defeat of the Mughals at Itakhuli in Guwahati. The Ahom kingdom reached its westernmost boundary till Manas River which it retains until 1826. Though the Ahom kingdom saw itself as the inheritor of the glory of the erstwhile Kamarupa kingdom and aspired to extend itself to the Karatoya river, it could never do so; though an Ahom general, Ton Kham under Suhungmung, reached the river once when he pursued a retreating invading army in the 16th century.

After the Ahom kingdom reached its zenith, problems within the kingdom arose in the 18th century, when it lost power briefly to rebels of the Moamoria rebellion. Though the Ahoms recaptured power, it was beset with problems, leading to the Burmese invasion of Assam in the early 19th century. With the defeat of the Burmese in the First Anglo-Burmese war and the subsequent Treaty of Yandaboo, control of Assam passed into the hands of the British, which marks the end of the Medieval period.

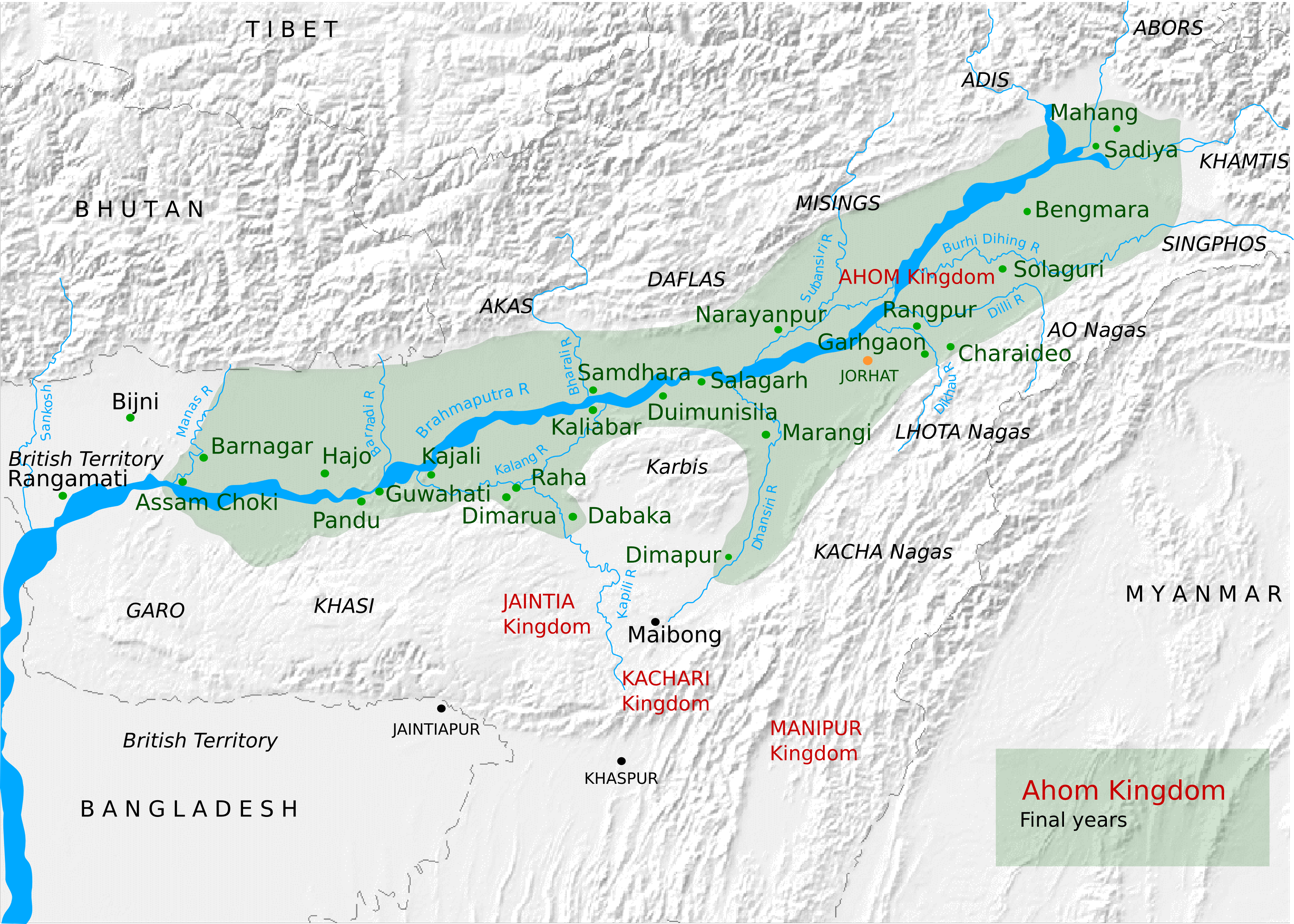
The Ahom Kingdom, c.1826

== Colonial Assam (1826–1947) ==
=== British annexation of Assam ===
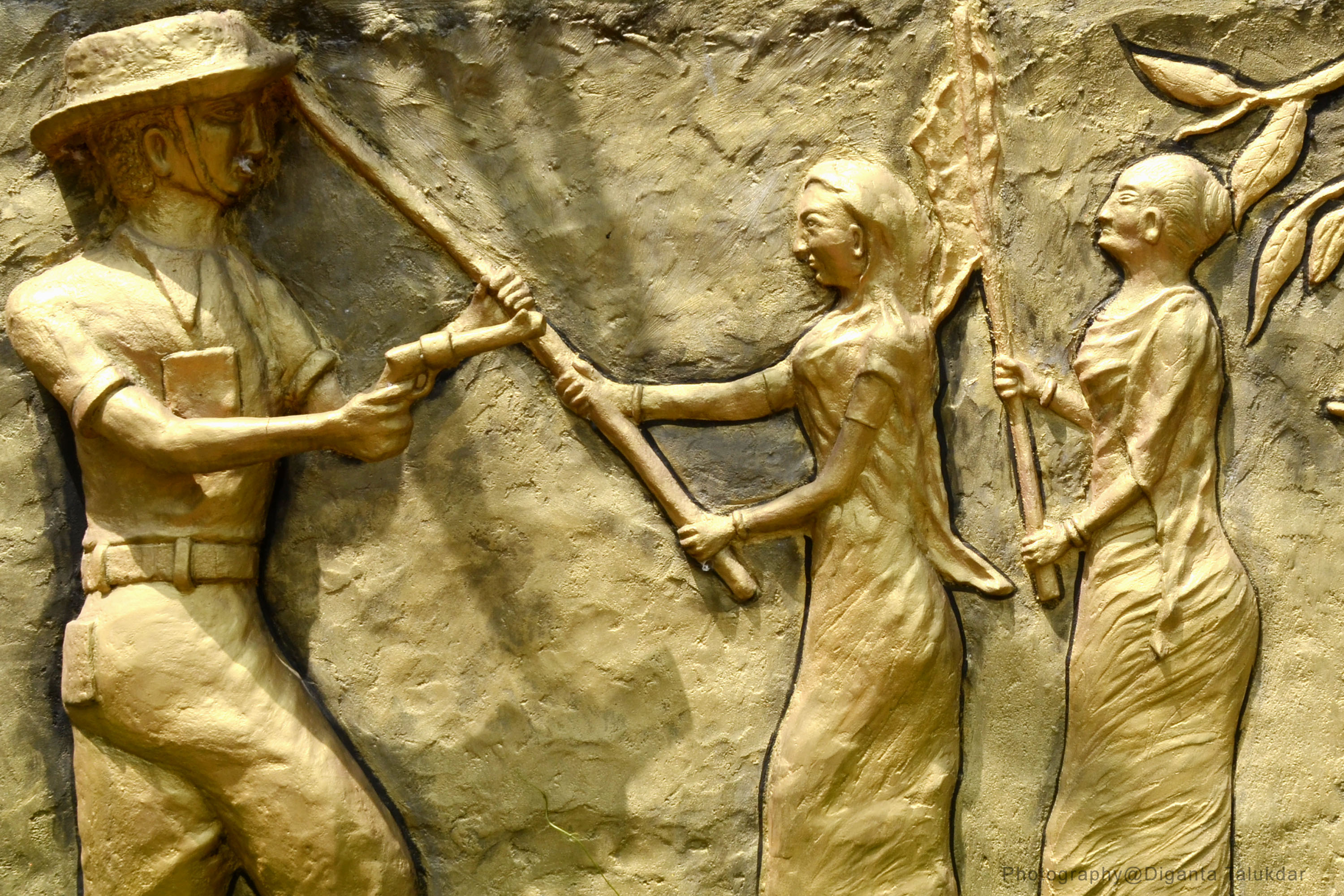
An artistic depiction of the Indian Independence movement in Assam

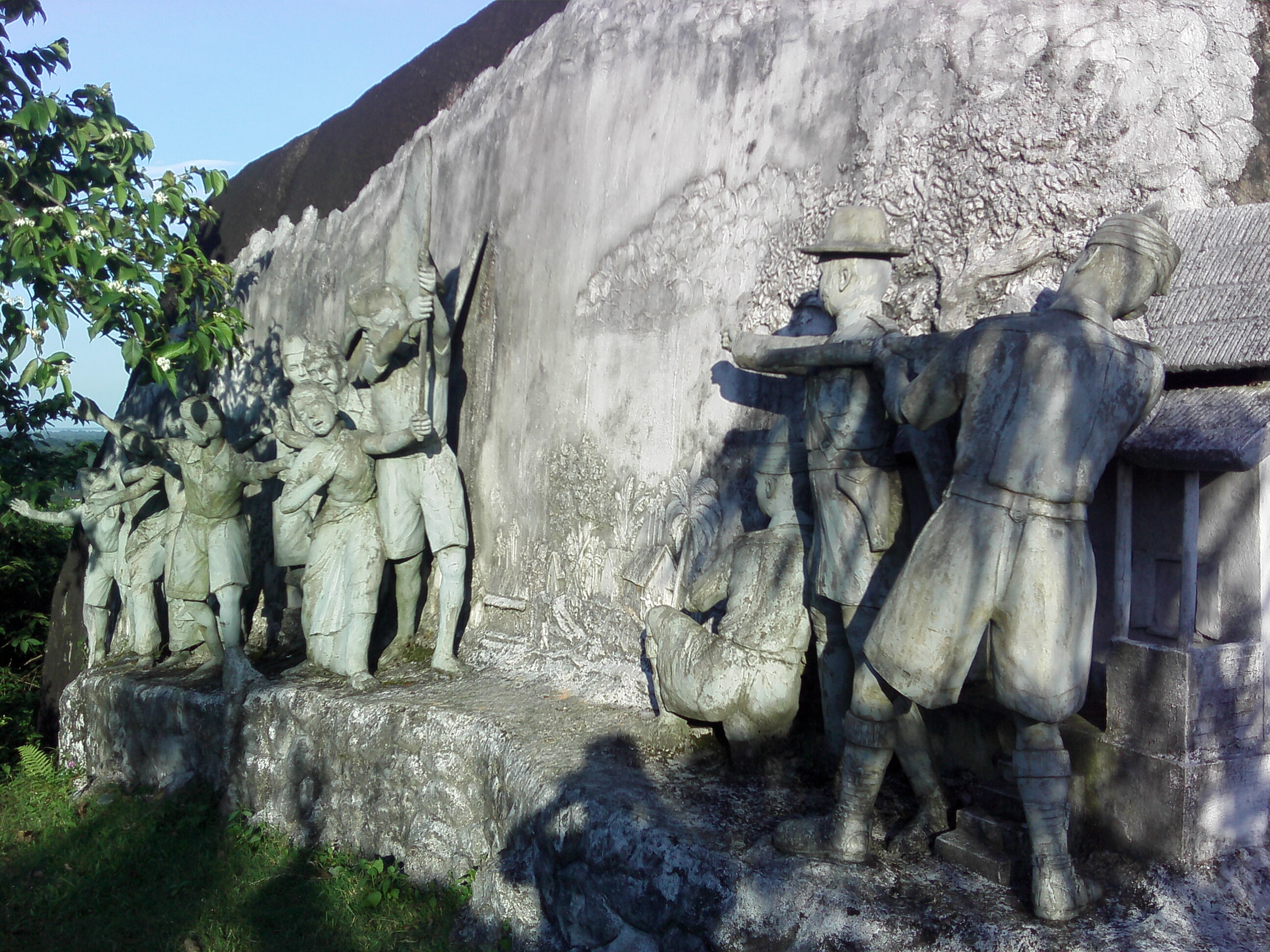
An artistic depiction of Kanaklata Barua's struggle against the British rule in Assam

In 1824, the First Anglo-Burmese War broke out. The British attacked the Burmese garrison in Assam and by 1825, the Burmese were expelled from Assam. According to the Treaty of Yandabo, the Burmese Monarch Bagyidaw renounce all claims on Assam. The British thus became the masters of Brahmaputra Valley and they began to consolidate their rule in Assam. In 1830, the Kachari king Govinda Chandra was assassinated. Seizing this opportunity, the British annexed Kachari kingdom in 1832. In 1833, the Ahom prince Purandar Singha was made a tributary ruler in Upper Assam. But owing to mismanagement and failure to pay regular revenue, the British authorities annexed his kingdom in 1838. In 1835, the kingdom of Jaintia was also annexed. In 1842, the Kingdom of Matak and the region of Sadiya was also annexed by British authorities, and in 1854, the North Cachar Hill district, under Tularam Senapati's administration, was also annexed into British Empire, thereby completing their conquest and consolidation of their rule in Assam.

=== Colonial rule ===
Bengal Presidency (1826–1873): Assam was included as a part of the Bengal Presidency. The annexation of upper Assam is attributed to the successful manufacture of tea in 1837, and the beginning of the Assam Company in 1839. Under the Wasteland Rules of 1838, it became nearly impossible for natives to start plantations. After the liberalization of the rules in 1854, there was a land rush. The Chinese staff that was imported earlier for the cultivation of tea left Assam in 1843, when tea plantations came to be tended by local labour solely, mainly by those belonging to the Kachari group. From 1859 central Indian labour was imported for the tea plantations. This labour, based on an unbreakable contract, led to a virtual slavery of this labour group. The conditions in which they were transported to Assam were so horrific that about 10% never survived the journey. The colonial government already had monopoly over the opium trade.

There were immediate protests and revolts against the British occupation. In 1828, two years after the Treaty of Yandaboo, Gomdhar Konwar rose in revolt against the British, but he was easily suppressed. In 1830 Dhananjoy Burhagohain, Piyali Phukan and Jiuram Medhi rose in revolt, and they were sentenced to death. In the Indian Rebellion of 1857, rebels supporters offered resistance in the form of non-cooperation, and Maniram Dewan and Piyali Baruah were executed for their roles. In 1861 peasants of Nagaon gathered at Phulaguri for a raiz mel (peoples' assembly) to protest against taxes on betel-nut and paan. An officer sent to confront the peasants, Lt. Singer, got into a fracas with the peasants and was killed, after which the protests were violently suppressed.

Chief Commissioner's Province (1874–1905): In 1874, the Assam region was separated from the Bengal Presidency, Sylhet was added to it and its status was upgraded to a Chief Commissioner's Province. The capital was at Shillong. The people of Sylhet protested the inclusion in Assam. Assamese, which was replaced by Bengali as the official language in 1837, was reinstated alongside Bengali. In 1889, oil was discovered at Digboi giving rise to an oil industry. In this period Nagaon witnessed starvation deaths, and there was a decrease in the indigenous population, which was more than adequately compensated by the immigrant labour. Colonialism was well entrenched, and the tea, oil and coal-mining industries were putting increasing pressure on the agricultural sector which was lagging behind.

The peasants, burdened under the opium monopoly and the usury by money lenders, rose again in revolt. Numerous raiz mels decided against paying the taxes. The protests culminated in a bayonet charge against the protesters at Patharughat in 1894. Around 140 people were left dead and in the violent repression that followed villagers were tortured and their properties were destroyed or looted. In 1903, Assam Association was formed with Manik Chandra Baruah as the first secretary.

Eastern Bengal and Assam under Lt. Governor (1906–1912): Bengal was partitioned and East Bengal was added to the Chief Commissioner's Province. The new region, now ruled by a Lt. Governor, had its capital at Dhaka. This province had a 15-member legislative council in which Assam had two seats. The members for these seats were recommended (not elected) by rotating groups of public bodies.

The Partition of Bengal was strongly protested in Bengal, and the people of Assam were not happy either. The partition was finally annulled by a royal decree in 1911. The Swadeshi movement (1905–1908) from this period, went largely unfelt in Assam, though it stirred some, most notably Ambikagiri Raychoudhury.

Beginning 1905 peasants from East Bengal began settling down in the riverine tracts (char) of the Brahmaputra valley encouraged by the colonial government to increase agricultural production and government had successful on that mission. Between 1905 and 1921, the immigrant population from East Bengal increased four folds. The immigration continued in post colonial times, giving rise to the Assam Agitation of 1979.

Assam Legislative Council (1912–1920): The administrative unit was reverted to a Chief Commissioner's Province (Assam plus Sylhet), with a Legislative Council added. The council had 25 members, of which the Chief Commissioner and 13 nominated members formed the bulk. The other members were elected by local public bodies like municipalities, local boards, landholders, tea planters and Muslims.

As Assam got sucked into the Non-Cooperation Movement, the Assam Association slowly transformed itself into the Assam Pradesh Congress Committee (with 5 seats in AICC) in 1920–21.

Dyarchy (1921–1937): Under the Government of India Act 1919 the Assam Legislative Council membership was increased to 53, of which 33 were elected by special constituencies. The powers of the council were increased too; but in effect, the official group, consisting of the Europeans, the nominated members etc. had the most influence.

Assam Legislative Assembly (1937–1947): Under the Government of India Act 1935, the council was expanded into an assembly of 108 members, with even more powers. The period saw the sudden rise of Gopinath Bordoloi and Muhammed Saadulah and their tussle for power and influence.

== Post-colonial Assam (1947–present) ==
In 1979, Assam flared into Assam Agitation (or Assam Movement) a popular movement against illegal immigration. The movement, led AASU and AAGSP, set an agitational program to compel the government to identify and expel illegal immigrants and prevent new immigration. The agitational programs were largely non-violent, but there were incidents of acute violence, like the Nellie massacre where over 3000 (non officially 10000 murdered) Bengali speaking Muslim were massacred in Nagaon district. It ended in 1985 following the Assam Accord that was signed by the agitation leaders and the Government of India. The agitation leaders formed a political party, Asom Gana Parishad, which came to power in the state of Assam in the Assembly elections of 1985.

In 2012 violent riots broke out between indigenous people led by NDFB(S) and minority Muslims of BTAD. But those were termed as immigration from Bangladesh, resulting in more than 85 deaths and displacement of 400,000 people.

There are 35 districts in total in Assam, by population, Nagaon is the largest district and Dima Hasao is the smallest district, Karbi Anglong is the largest district in terms of area and Kamrup Metropolitan is the smallest district.

== Gallery ==
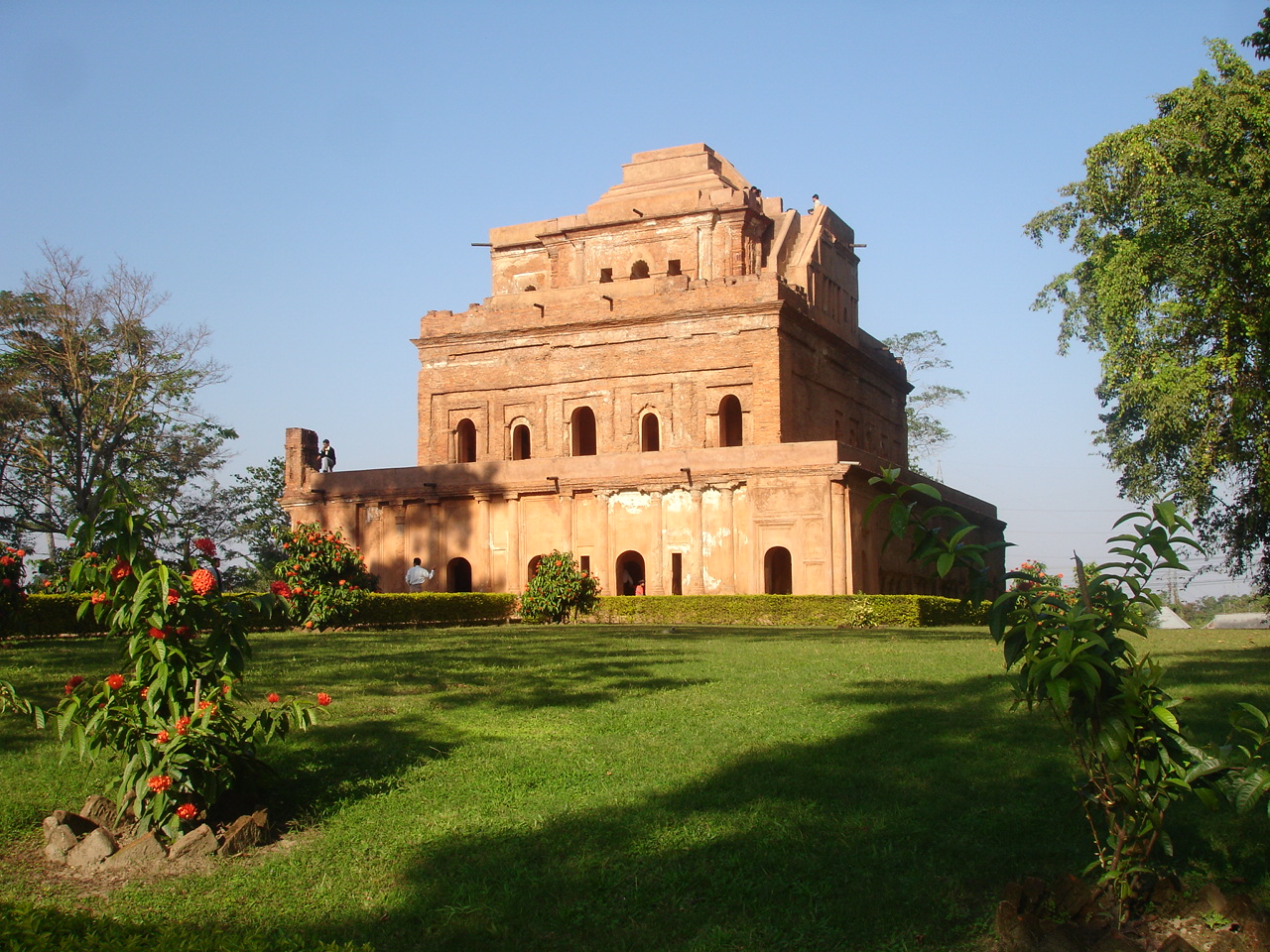
Kareng ghar, the palace of the Ahom kings in their former capital Garhgaon

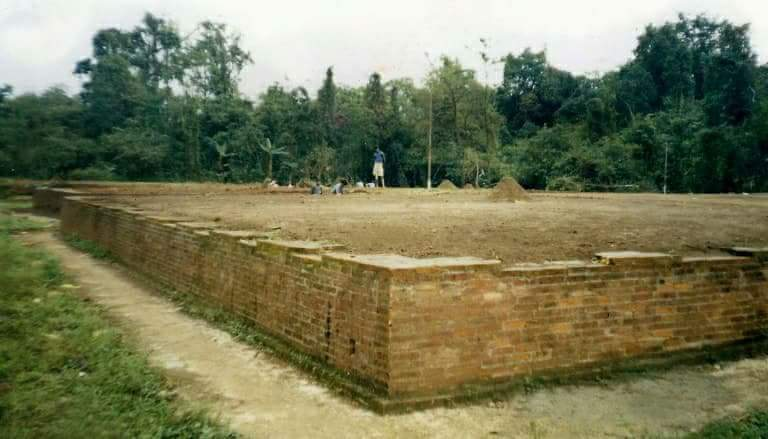
Chutia Royal Palace Bhismaknagar ruins

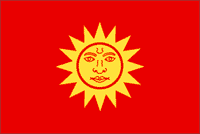
Koch kingdom: Coat of Arms

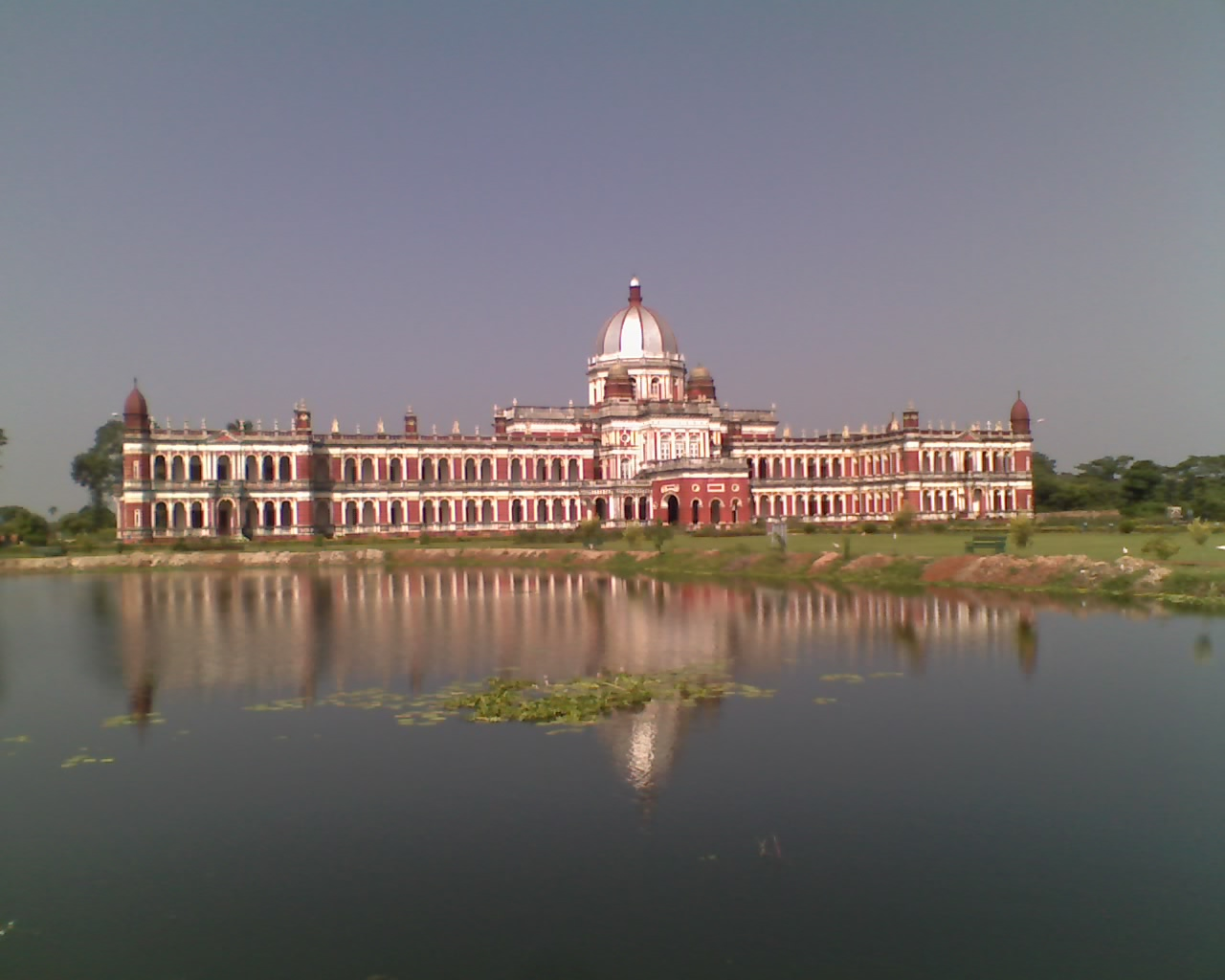
Koch Royal Palace

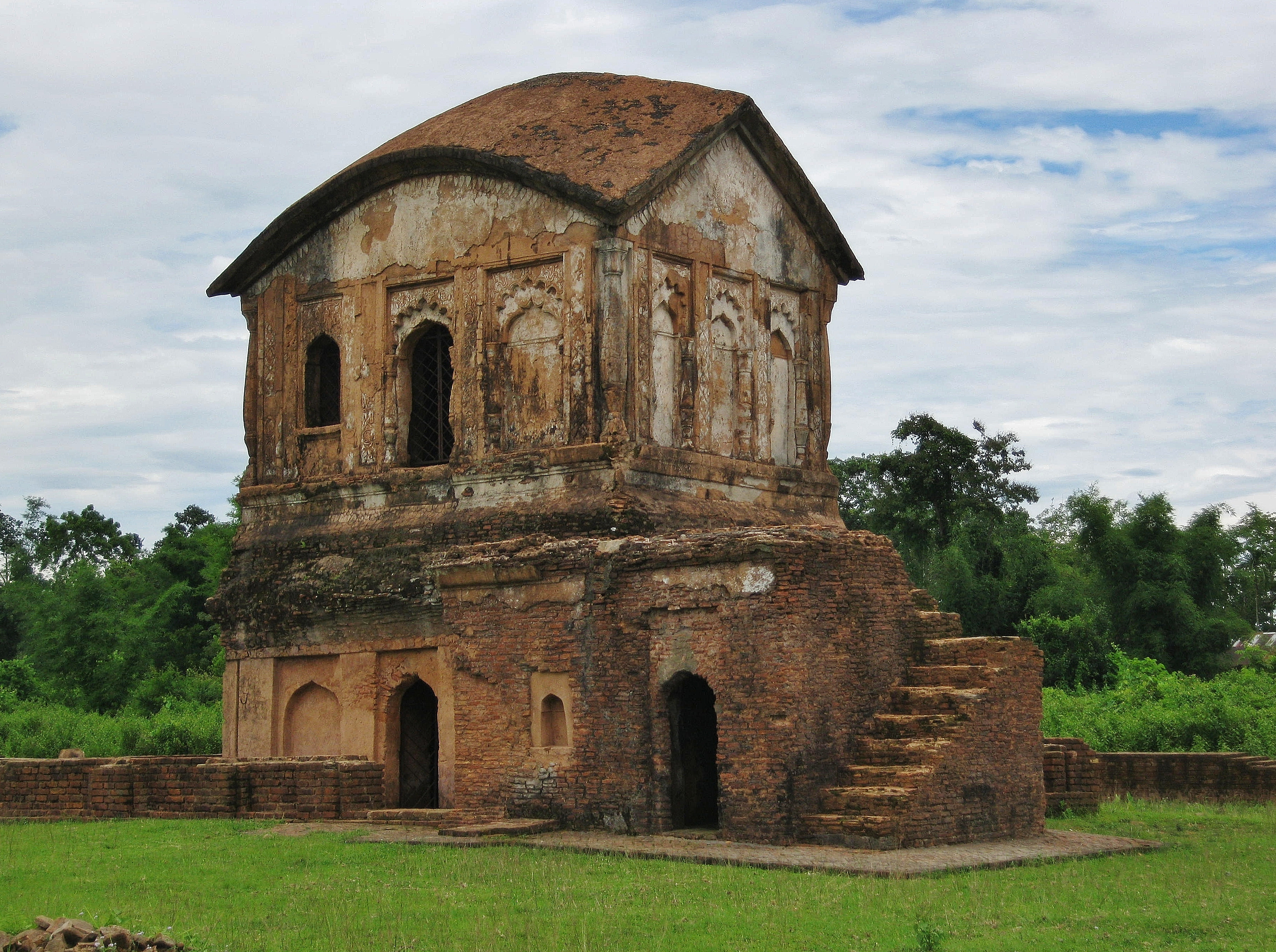
Dimasa palace ruins

== Gallery of Assamese monarchs ==
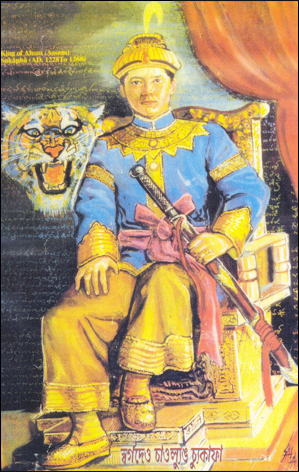
First Ahom king Chao-lung Siu-ka-phaa

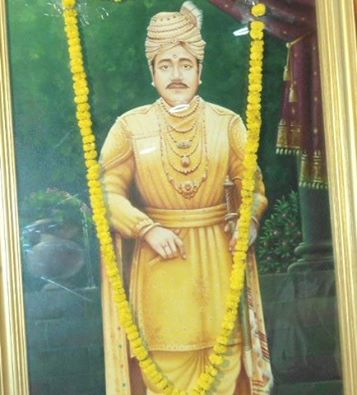
Last Dimasa King, Govindra Chandra Hasnu

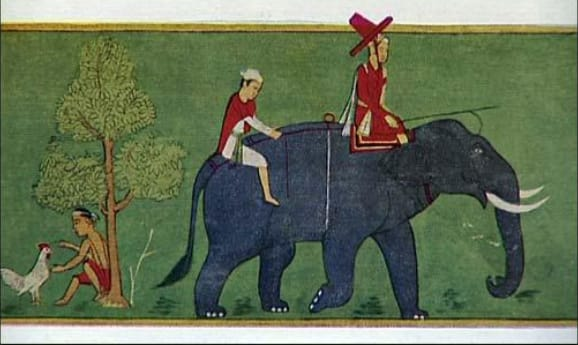
Swargodeo Siva Singha riding elephant

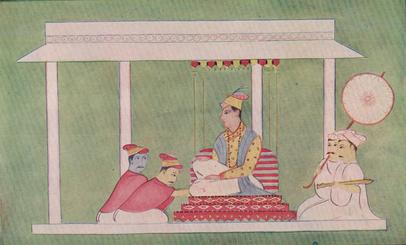
Rudra Singha Jayata in court

== See also ==
- Timeline of Assam History
- History of People of Assam
- History of Assamese literature
