= Demographics of Assam =

The population of Assam consist of tribal ethnic groups (including Bodo, Karbi, Rabha, Mishing, Dimasa, Deori) and linguistic groups such as Assamese, Bengali, Hindi speakers, Nepali and Odia speakers.

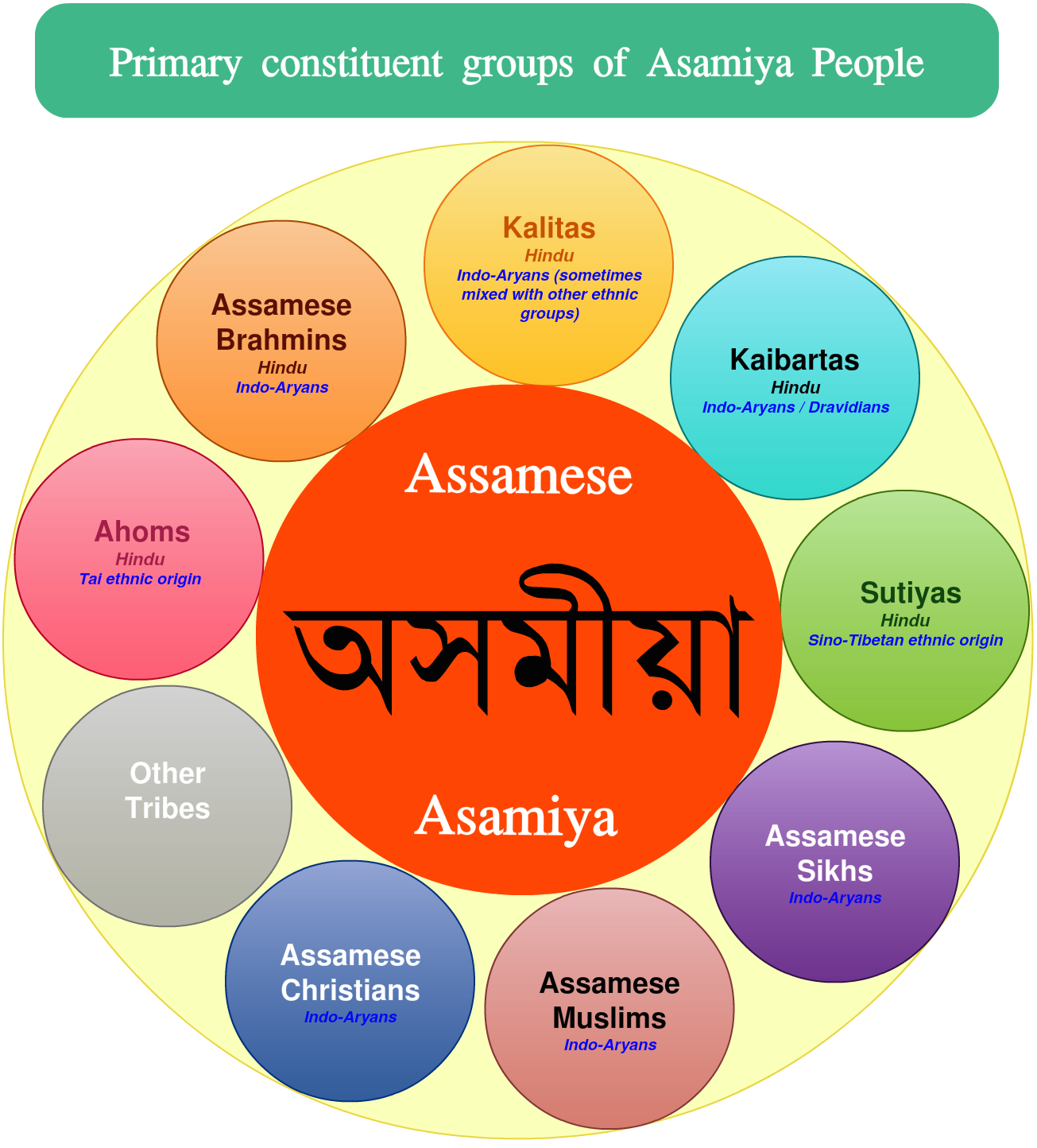

== Demography ==
The issue of illegal influx has a 40-year history, starting with the anti-foreigner agitation that began in 1979 under the leadership of the All Assam Students’ Union (AASU). In 1985, after hundreds of people died in course of Independent India’s biggest mass uprising, the AASU, and other agitation groups signed an agreement with the Centre called the Assam Accord. It fixed 25 March 1971 as the cut-off date for detection and expulsion of illegal migrants, meaning anyone found entering India after this date were to be detected and sent back.

According to an Assam government white paper, between 1985 and 2012, 2,442 illegal immigrants from Bangladesh had been expelled from the state. On 1 September 2020, when Assam final NRC list was released, It was found that 19,06,657 people names have been excluded (which is about 6% of the state population), out of total 3.11 crore state population.

=== Introduction ===
Assam has two valleys - Brahmaputra Valley/Assam Valley (dominated by the Assamese and other indigenous tribals like Rabhas, Morans, Chutiyas, Ahoms, Tea tribes, Koch Rajbongshis, Tiwa etc.) 2) Barak Valley (dominated by Bengalis). While Bodoland region of Brahmaputra Valley is dominated by Bodo, followed by the Assamese community. Also it have three hills district comprising Karbi Anglong (East & West) and Dima Hasao (dominated mainly by indigenous Karbi and Dimasa tribes respectively).

Languages spoken in Brahmaputra Valley (2011)
1. Assamese (official) (55.7%)
2. Bengali (22.1%)
3. Hindi (7.60%)
4. Bodo (5.13%)
5. Others (9.52%)

The population of the Brahmaputra Valley is 27,580,977 according to the 2011 census report by the Assam government. Assamese is the official language of the Brahmaputra Valley and is spoken by 15.1 million people comprising 55.65% of the valley population. Bengali is spoken by 6.09 million people representing 22.1% of the valley, Hindi is spoken by 2.1 million comprising 7.61% of the region, Bodo is spoken by 1.41 million comprising 5.13% of the valley's population and 2.88 million people speak various indigenous tribal languages of Assam, such as Santali, Karbi, Lalung, Hmar, Deori, Rabha, Mishing, Koch, Rajbangshi, Sadri, Garo, Dimasa, Gondi, Savara, Gorkha, Halam, Rengma, Ao and Motak.

Languages spoken in Barak Valley (2011)
1. Bengali (80.8%)
2. Hindi (10.0%)
3. Manipuri (3.49%)
4. Bishnupriya Manipuri (1.38%)
5. Dimasa (0.60%)
6. Tripuri (0.59%)
7. Odia (0.53%)
8. Nepali (0.14%)
9. Others (2.43%)

As per (2011) language census report, Bengali is the official as well as the most spoken language of the region with approximately 2,930,378 native speakers.

Hindi, Manipuri, Bishnupriya and Dimasa are the next most widely spoken languages with 362,459, 126,498, 50,019 and 21,747 native speakers, respectively. Tripuri, Odia, Nepali and Marwari are also spoken by a considerable minority, while 2.43% of the total population speaks other tribal languages.

=== Demographic changes ===
As per as census of India report 2011, around 14,816,414 Assamese speaking population lives in India, thus constituting 1.26% of the nation's population.

Historical Assamese Population in Assam
Year	Pop.	±%
1951	4,971,229	—
1961	6,784,271	+36.5%
1971	8,905,544	+31.3%
1991	12,958,088	+45.5%
2001	13,010,478	+0.4%
2011	15,095,797	+16.0%

Languages of Assam (2011)
1. Assamese (48.4%)
2. Bengali (28.9%)
3. Bodo (4.51%)
4. Hindi (3.21%)
5. Sadri (2.29%)
6. Mishing (1.98%)
7. Nepali (1.91%)
8. Karbi (1.64%)
9. Others (7.16%)

As per 2011 census, Assam state had around 31.2 million people, out of which (15 million) were Assamese speakers comprising 48% of the state population, while (9 million) were Bengali speakers comprising 29% of the state population, and 3.21% spoke Hindi and its dialects.

Decadal percentage of Assamese speakers in Assam

Year	Percent	Increase
1951	56.29%	-
1961	57.14%	+0.85%
1971	59.53%	+2.39%
1991	57.81%	-1.72%
2001	48.81%	-9%
2011	48.37%	-0.44%

According to reports, in 1971 the number of Assamese-speaking populace was 60.89% in the census, with a population of (8.9 million), higher than their numbers in 2011. While the Bengali and Hindi-speaking population were at 19.70% (2.8 million) and 5.42% (7.9 lakhs). The Assamese speakers constituted 48% of the State population according to the 2011 Census, and it is predicted that the 2021 Census (currently under way) will reveal the percentage to dip lower below 40%. However, If Bengali-majority Barak Valley region is excluded, then the percentage of native Assamese speakers in Assam alone will rise directly to 55.65% from 48% as per 2011 census figures calculation.

=== Illegal Immigration ===
In January 2019, the Assam's peasant organisation Krishak Mukti Sangram Samiti (KMSS) claimed that there are around 20 lakh (2 million) Hindu Bangladeshis in Assam. According to the census data, the number of Hindu immigrants is difficult to ascertain and have been largely exaggerated.

Census of India between (2001-2011) have shown that Bangladeshi Muslim population grows 5-7% in Assam specially in the bordering districts over the past decade. In February 2020, the Assam Minority Development Board announced plans to segregate illegal Bangladeshi Muslim immigrants from the indigenous Muslims of the state, though some have expressed problems in identifying an indigenous Muslim person. According to the board, there are 1.3 crore (13 million) Muslims in the state, of which 9 million are of Bangladeshi origin. Allegedly the number of 'illegal immigrants' in Assam of all religions is about 1 crore (10 million) and are scattered across the length and breadth of the state. A report reveals that out of total 33 districts in Assam, Bangladeshis dominate almost 15 districts of Assam.

== Religion ==
Religion in Assam is closely related to ethnicity, closely around 65% of Assamese people, 90% of Bodo tribe, 83% of Karbi tribe, 95% of Ahom tribe, 94% of Rabha tribe, 97% of Mishing tribe, 99% of Dimasa tribe are mainly Hindu by religion. Christianity is mainly practised by 9% of Assamese Community, 10% of Bodo tribe, 20% of Tea Tribe and 15% of Karbi tribe respectively. About 26% of all ethnic Assamese are Muslim by faith. 66% of the Assam Bengalis are Muslim by faith, and a significant population of them (about 34%) adhere to Hindu faith. Immigrants from other parts of India, like Marwaris, Biharis, Nepalis, Uttar Pradeshis, Odias etc are mostly Hindu with a minority being Muslims among Biharis and Uttar Pradeshis, Buddhist among Nepalis and Jains among Marwaris.

Religion in Assam (2011)
1. Hinduism (61.5%)
2. Islam (34.2%)
3. Christianity (3.74%)
4. Buddhism (0.18%)
5. Jainism (0.08%)
6. Sikhism (0.07%)
7. Animism (0.09%)
8. Others (0.16%)
9. Atheist (0.03%)

According to the 2011 census, 61.47% were Hindus, 34.22% were Muslims. Christian minorities (3.7%) are found among the Scheduled Tribe and Castes population. Other religions followed include Jainism (0.1%), Buddhism (0.2%), Sikhism (0.1%) and Animism (among Khamti, Phake, Aiton etc. communities). Many Hindus in Assam are followers of the Ekasarana Dharma sect of Hinduism, which gave rise to Namghar, designed to be simpler places of worship than traditional Hindu temples.

Assam's Religious diversity as of the 2011 census
Religion	Population
Hindus	19,180,759
Muslims	10,679,345
Christians	1,165,867
Buddhists	54,993
Jains	25,949
Sikhs	20,672
Other religions	27,118
Not stated/available	50,873
Total	31,205,576

Out of 32 districts of Assam, 11 are Muslim-majority and 5 districts have significant population according to the 2011 census of India. The districts are Dhubri, Goalpara, Barpeta, Morigaon, Nagaon, Karimganj, Hailakandi, Darrang, South Salmara, Hojai and Bongaigaon. Significant Muslim populated districts are Cachar, Nalbari, Kokrajhar, Chirang and Kamrup.

== See also ==
- People of Assam
- Miya people
- Bengali Hindus in Assam
- Meitei people in Assam
- Islam in Assam
- Hinduism in Assam
- Christianity in Assam
- Political Demography of Assam
