= Indo-Aryan migration to Assam =

Migration into Northeast India

The earliest Indo-Aryan migration to Assam is estimated to have occurred between the 2nd century BCE and 1st century CE—not earlier than 500 BCE. The earliest epigraphic record suggests that the Indo-Aryan migration began latest by the middle of the 4th century CE. They came from the Gangetic Plains into a region already inhabited by people who spoke Austroasiatic and Tibeto-Burman languages.

== Pre-Indo-Aryan Assam ==
The 8th- to 6th-century BCE text, Shatapatha Brahmana, describes the Sanskritization of East India up to the Karatoya River, the western boundary of the historic Kamarupa kingdom. Though the Sankhyayana Grihasamgraha is said to mention "Pragjyotisha" as the land of sunrise, this has been shown to be a wrong attribution. Archaeologically too, the Northern Black Polished Ware, a pottery style associated with the development of the first large states in Northern India, reached the Karatoya only by the 2nd century BCE. Therefore, it is claimed that the spread of Indo-Aryans into Assam cannot be pushed beyond the 5th century BCE.

It is also significant that neither early Buddhist sources, nor Ashokan epigraphs (3rd century BCE with the capital in East India) mention the Assam region. The Periplus of the Erythraean Sea (1st century CE) and Ptolemy's Geography (2nd century CE) refer to the region that included Assam as Kirrhadia, after the Kirata people (pre-Indo-Aryan), who were also the sources of the goods that were being traded. A reference to Lauhitya in Kautilya's Arthashastra is identified by commentators with the Brahmaputra Valley, though the Arthashastra in its current form is dated to the early centuries of CE, and the commentaries to even later.

It appears that the Assam region became a punya bhumi, a region that did not require a Hindu purification ceremony, by the post Gupta period (320-550 CE).

== Introduction of Indo-Aryan ==
The earliest historical mention of this region in Indo-Aryan comes from Samudragupta's Allahabad inscription, where two kingdoms from the region—Kamarupa and Davaka—are mentioned. The earliest evidence of Indo-Aryan in Assam are the 5th-century Umachal and Nagajari-Khanikargaon rock inscriptions written in Sanskrit.

=== Brahman settlements ===
In the historic period, the Kamarupa kings encouraged immigration from North India, and settled Brahmins as "islands of private domains in a sea of communally held tribal lands of shifting cultivation". Two inscriptions of Bhaskaravarman (600-650 CE) on copper plates are re-issues of grants to Brahmins to settle in parts of the Kamarupa kingdom during the reign of Bhutivarman (518-542). This policy, of the local kings settling Brahmans from other places in the kingdom, was a common policy of all Kamarupa kings that gave rise to pockets of Brahmanic influence. From the inscriptions it can be made out that the Brahman donees came to Assam from present-day Bangladesh, West Bengal, Bihar and Uttar Pradesh. The number of Brahmin grants on record remained small even post–7th century, as the land was not granted on a large scale by any ruler of the Mleccha and Pala dynasty. These early land grants had natural boundaries such as trees or water, indicating they were isolated, those from the later Pala rulers (10-11th century), increasingly bordered on other granted lands. One such settlement was Habung in eastern Assam where Ratnapal of the Pala dynasty of Kamarupa settled Brahmins in c. the 10th century, then known as Ha-Vrnga Vishaya.

In the late medieval period beginning with the early 16th century, a number of Brahmins from Mithila, Benaras, Kanauj and Puri (Srikshetra) were settled in western Assam by the Koch kings for performing Brahminical rites and this process was later continued by the Ahom state especially under the Tungkhungia Ahom kings.

=== Baro-Bhuyan settlements ===
Non-Brahmin Indo-Aryan immigration occurred during the medieval times, and some of them came to be identified as part of the Baro-Bhuyans.

=== Languages ===
The subsequent Kamarupa inscriptions, written in Sanskrit, suggest that a majority of the Indo-Aryan immigrants spoke Kamarupi Prakrit the precursor of Assamese language and the Proto-Kamata; and that the learned few knew Sanskrit. Sanskrit was the liturgical language of Hinduism and the state language of Kamarupa; and Assamese became a link language, accepted as a second language by some of the aboriginal peoples; over time, it became the first language for many. In return, Assamese acquired linguistic features of the native speakers. The writing shows an evolution from the early Gupta script towards modern Assamese script. The latest examples, such as the Kanai-boroxiboa inscription, use a proto-Assamese script.

== Sanskritisation under the Kamarupa kings ==
Though traditional accounts claim that the kings of Assam were Indo-Aryan, modern scholarship concludes that the kings were originally non-Indo-Aryan. Sanskritization, was a process that occurred simultaneously with "deshification" (or localisation, or tribalisation) in Assam. However, the process of Sanskritisation was never complete in Assam and significant sections of the population remained outside the Brahmanical influence.

== Modern Assamese language ==
The modern Assamese language is the easternmost Indo-Aryan language, spoken by over 15 million native speakers. It also serves as a lingua franca in the region. With closely related languages it is also spoken in parts of Arunachal Pradesh and other northeast Indian states.

== See also ==
- Tibeto-Burman migration to Indian subcontinent
- Varman dynasty
- Pala Dynasty
- Indo-Aryan migration theories
- Indo-Aryan superstrate in Mitanni
- Sanskrit
- Aryan

== Bibliography ==
- Shin, Jae-Eun (2010). "Yoni, Yoginīs and Mahāvidyās: Feminine Divinities from Early Medieval Kāmarūpa to Medieval Koch Behar, Studies in History". Studies in History. 26 (1): 1–29. doi:10.1177/025764301002600101. S2CID 155252564.
- Das, Sneha (2014). "Engraved Histories: A Study of Legend of Naraka and Political Legitimacy in the Kamarupa Region". Proceedings of the Indian History Congress. 75. Indian History Congress: 153–159. ISSN 2249-1937. JSTOR 44158374.
- Sheikh, Amiruzzaman (2012). "The 16th century Koch kingdom: Evolving patterns of sanskritisation". Proceedings of the Indian History Congress. 73: 249–254. ISSN 2249-1937. JSTOR 44156212.
- Baruah, Nirode (2008). "Sanskritization and Detribalization in Early Assam: Some Geographical Aspects". Proceedings of the Indian History Congress. 69. Indian History Congress: 167–179. JSTOR 44147178.
- Das, Paromita (2005). "The Naraka Legends, Aryanisation and the "varnasramadharma" in the Brahmaputra Valley". Proceedings of the Indian History Congress. 66. Indian History Congress: 224–230. JSTOR 44145840.
- DeLancey, Scott (2012). Hyslop, Gwendolyn; Morey, Stephen; w. Post, Mark (eds.). "On the Origin of Bodo-Garo". Northeast Indian Linguistics. 4: 3–20. doi:10.1017/UPO9789382264521.003. ISBN 9789382264521.
- Deka, Phani (2007). The great Indian corridor in the east. Mittal Publications. p. 404.
- Guha, Amalendu (1983). "The Ahom Political System: An Enquiry into the State Formation Process in Medieval Assam" (PDF). Social Scientist. 11 (12): 3–34. doi:10.2307/3516963. JSTOR 3516963.
- Guha, Amalendu (1984). "Pre-Ahom Roots and the Medieval State in Assam: A Reply". Social Scientist. 12 (6): 70–77. doi:10.2307/3517005. JSTOR 3517005.
- Lahiri, Nayanjot (1990). "Landholding and Peasantry in the Brahmaputra Valley C. 5th–13th Centuries A.D.". Journal of the Economic and Social History of the Orient. 33 (2). Brill: 157–168. doi:10.2307/3632226. JSTOR 3632226.
- Moral, Dipankar (1997), "North-East India as a Linguistic Area" (PDF), Mon-Khmer Studies, 27: 43–53
- Pathak, Guptajit (2008). Assam's history and its graphics. Mittal Publications. p. 211.
- Puri, Baij Nath (1968). Studies in Early History and Administration in Assam. Gauhati University.
- Samiti, Kamarupa Anusandhana (1984). Readings in the history & culture of Assam. Kamrupa Anusandhana Samiti. p. 227.
- Sharma, Mukunda Madhava (1978). Inscriptions of Ancient Assam. Guwahati, Assam: Gauhati University.
- Sircar, D C (1990), "Pragjyotisha-Kamarupa", in Barpujari, H K (ed.), The Comprehensive History of Assam, vol. I, Guwahati: Publication Board, Assam, pp. 59–78
- Sircar, D C (1990b), "Political History", in Barpujari, H K (ed.), The Comprehensive History of Assam, vol. I, Guwahati: Publication Board, Assam, pp. 94–171
- Taher, M (2001), "Assam: An Introduction", in Bhagawati, A K (ed.), Geography of Assam, New Delhi: Rajesh Publications, pp. 1–17
- Urban, Hugh (2009), The Power of Tantra: Religion, Sexuality and the Politics of South Asian Studies, Bloomsbury Publishing, ISBN 9780857715869
- Urban, Hugh B. (2011). "The Womb of Tantra: Goddesses, Tribals, and Kings in Assam". The Journal of Hindu Studies. 4 (3): 231–247. doi:10.1093/jhs/hir034.
- Shin, Jae-Eun (2018), "Region Formed and Imagined: Reconsidering temporal, spatial and social context of Kamarupa", in Dzüvichü, Lipokmar; Baruah, Manjeet (eds.), Modern Practices in North East India: History, Culture, Representation, London & New York: Routledge
- Rosati, Paolo E. (2017). "The Cross-Cultural Kingship in Early Medieval Kāmarūpa: Blood, Desire and Magic". Religions. 8 (10): 1–18. doi:10.3390/rel8100212. hdl:11573/1135168.
- Adhikary, Madhab. (2018), "Development of Saiva Cult in Koch Kingdom Under Maharaja Biswa Singha (1496–1540).", Uttar Prasanga, 12 (3–4): 25–31
- Goswami, G. C.; Tamuli, Jyotiprakash (2003). "Asamiya". In Cardona, George; Jain, Dhanesh (eds.). The Indo-Aryan languages. Routledge. pp. 391–443. ISBN 978-0-7007-1130-7.
- Lahiri, Nayanjot (1991). Pre-Ahom Assam: Studies in the Inscriptions of Assam between the Fifth and the Thirteenth Centuries AD. Delhi: Munshiram Manoharlal Publishers Pvt Ltd.
- Mudur, G.S. (21 March 2026). "Northeast a genetic melting pot: Study finds region acted as corridor, not barrier". The Telegraph.
