= Assamese people =

Socio-ethnolinguistic group in India

Total population
- c. 15.3 million

Regions with significant populations
- India: 15,311,351
- Bangladesh: 5,000

Languages
- Assamese

Religion
- Majority: Hinduism; Minority: Islam; Christianity; Buddhism

Related ethnic groups
- Bodo-Kachari peoples, Indo-Aryan peoples, Assamese Meitei people, Tibeto-Burman and Tai peoples of Assam

The Assamese people are a socio-ethnic linguistic identity that has been described at various times as nationalistic or micro-nationalistic. This group is often associated with the Assamese language, the easternmost Indo-Aryan language, and Assamese people mostly live in the Brahmaputra Valley region of Assam, where they are native and constitute around 56% of the valley's population. The use of the term precedes the name of the language or the people. It has also been used retrospectively to the people of Assam before the term "Assamese" came into use. They are an ethnically diverse group formed after centuries of assimilation of Austroasiatic, Tibeto-Burman, Indo-Aryan and Tai populations, and constitute a tribal-caste continuum—though not all Assamese people are Hindus and ethnic Assamese Muslims numbering around 42 lakh (4,200,000) constitute a significant part of this identity. The total population of Assamese speakers in Assam is nearly 15.09 million which makes up 48.38% of the population of state according to the Language census of 2011.

== Etymology ==
The name "Assamese" is of British colonial coinage of the 19th and 20th century. Assamese is an English word meaning "of Assam"—though most Assamese people live in Assam, not all the people of Assam today are Assamese people.

== Definition ==
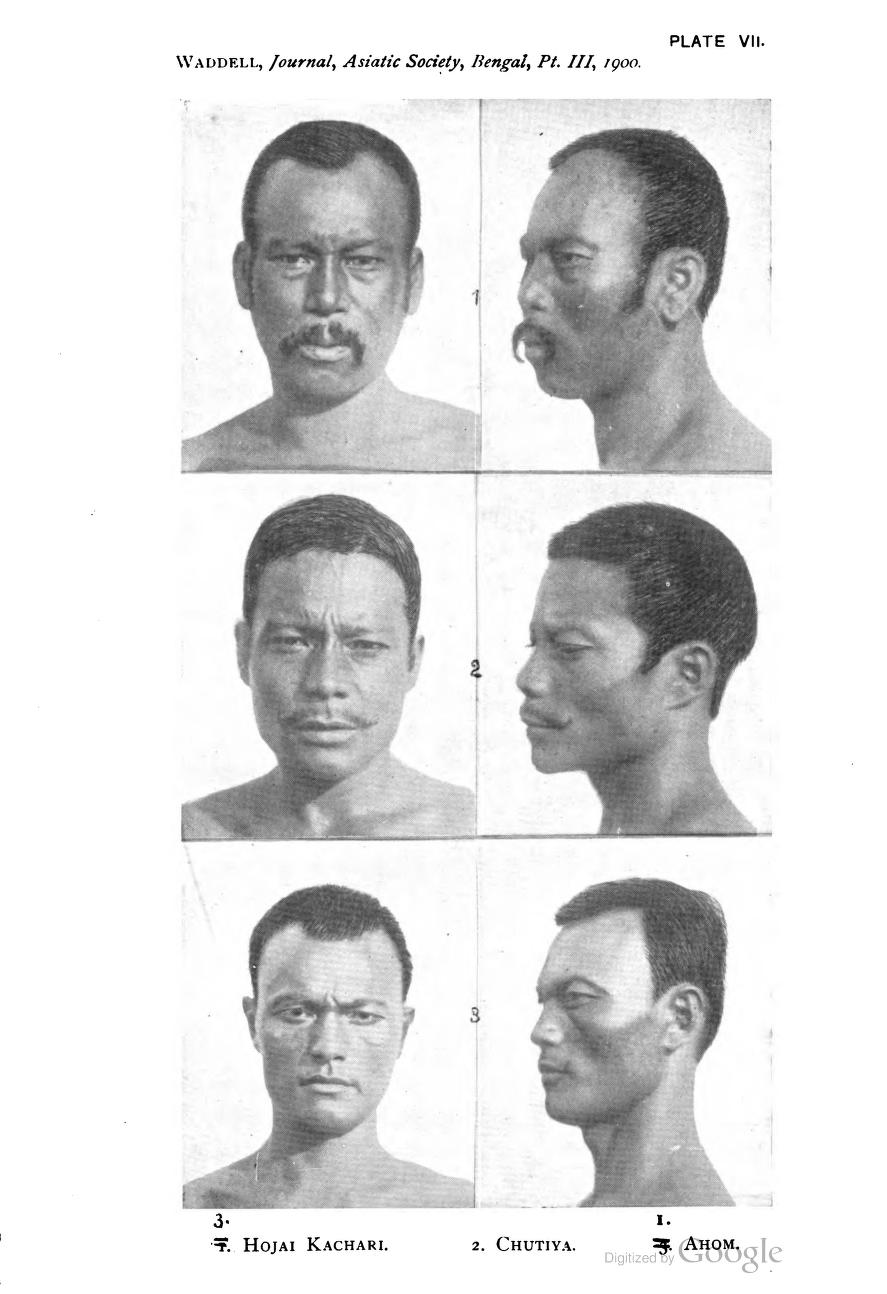
Tribal ethnicities from Brahmaputra Valley (depicting from top to down: Ahom, Chutia, Hojai Kachari men)

The Government of Assam faced difficulties in defining Assamese people for Assam Accord due to a linguistically and culturally heterogeneous population. Though there is a political dispute over the definition of Assamese people, in general; the people belonging to the state of Assam are referred sometimes as Assamese people or more appropriately as People of Assam. The lack of a definition has put stumbling blocks in implementing clause 6 of the Assam Accord, an agreement signed by the activists of the Assam Movement and the Government of India in 1985. Since a legal definition is important to provide "constitutional, legislative and cultural" safeguards to the Assamese people, the Government of Assam had formed a ministerial committee to finalise the definition in March 2007. To address the clause 6 issue, AASU had announced a definition on 10 April 2000 which was based on residency with a temporal limit: All those whose names appeared in the 1951 National Register of Citizens and their progenies should be considered as Assamese.

Despite the lack of a legal definition, social scientists consider the Assamese identity to constitute a tribal-caste continuum that has been the result of a historical process.

== Demographics ==
The population of Assamese-speaking people in India, as per the 2011 Census, is 15,311,351, constituting 1.26% of the country's total population. This places the Assamese language at the 12th position among the 22 scheduled languages spoken in India. Out of this, 15,097,257 people reside in Assam, making up 48.38% of the state's total population, which accounts for 98.6% of the total Assamese-speaking population in India.

== History ==
=== Origins of the nationalistic identity ===
Assamese as a nationalistic identity was seeded when the Ahom kingdom came under repeated attacks from the Bengal Sultanate in the early 16th century and the people banded together under Suhungmung (1497–1539) to resist a common enemy. The kingdom not only succeeded in resisting the invasion, but a general pursued the invaders to the Karatoya river and freed most of the Kamrup and Kamata regions.

The process of identity formation sped up during the rule of Pratap Singha (1603–1641) when the Mughals began repeated incursions from 1615 and the Battle of Saraighat in 1671; and finally the Battle of Itakhuli (1682 CE) when the Ahoms took direct control over western Brahmaputra valley. Many Muslim soldiers and professionals who had accompanied invading armies or immigrated peacefully since the 13th century, including those from the 16th century, were given power and eminence by the Ahom kings, and they in turn helped the Ahoms in repelling the Mughals. This was also the time when the Assamese language progressively replaced the Ahom language in the court and outside. As a result of the Ahom kings increasingly patronising Hinduism alongside the proselytising activities of Ekasarana Dharma since the 16th-century—a large section of the Bodo-Kachari peoples converted to different forms of Hinduism in the 17th-18th century and a composite Assamese identity comprising caste-Hindus, tribals and Assamese Muslims began to form.

On the eve of British colonialism in the early 19th century the Assamese society consisted of the hinduised ethnic groups, the caste Hindu groups, the plain tribal groups, and the Assamese Muslims; and the expression of Assamese nationalism in the 19th/20th-century was confined to the Brahmaputra valley.

=== Tribe-Caste continuum ===
==== Social movement due to state formations ====
Scholars believe that with the arrival of Indo-Aryans in Assam, there was a simultaneous Sanskritisation and deshification processes beginning in the 5th–8th century during the reign of the Varman dynasty of Kamarupa;—and all Assam's kings were originally non-Indo-Aryan who were gradually Sanskritised. This enabled many of the common folks to follow the ruling classes into Sanskritisation and also bring along with them elements of their own local customs and religions.

==== Social movement due to Ekasarana religion ====
The Ekasarana dharma that emerged in the 16th century and the proselytising activities of the Sattra institutions created a path for individuals of tribal origins to traverse the tribal-caste continuum. Tribal people could take initiation at a Sattra—and a neophyte would be called a modahi if he still took liquor. A modahi successively advanced to the Sarania group (also called saru-koch), Koch, Bor-Koch, Saru-Keot, Bor-Keot and then a Kalita. At the end of this tribal-caste continuum were the Brahmins and often the pontiffs of Sattra's were Brahmins called Goswamis. Some of these Goswamis were a few generations earlier Kayasthas, and some Kayastha pontiffs were earlier tribal and low caste. It is this process by which many groups such as Chutia, Borahi, Moran, Deori, Boro peoples to become Assamese peasants, especially in Upper and Central Assam; and it was noted that some kayastha sattradhikars were originally Morans, Kaibartas, Chandalas, Tantis and Sankardev had himself instated gurus from Muslim, Kaibarta, Nagas, and Garo communities.

== See also ==
- Assamese Brahmins
- Assamese Meiteis
- Tribes of Assam
- Assamese Language Movement
- Music of Assam
- People of Assam
- Demography of Assam
- Assamese Chinese
