= Pehli Nazar Ka Pyaar =

- Directed by: Arshad Khan (writer/director, India)
- Screenplay by: Armaan sahabi Arshad khan
- Story by: Armaan sahabi
- Produced by: JABEEN KAK
- Starring: Divvij kak Sweety chhabra Arbaaz Ali Khan Vikas Anand; Rahul; Dinesh Hingoo
- Cinematography: Shakil Ansari
- Edited by: Suresh chaturvedi
- Music by: Ali-Ghani
- Release date: 11 April 2008
- Running time: 145 Minutes
- Country: India
- Language: Hindi

Pehli Nazar Ka Pyaar is a 2008 romantic Hindi film directed by Arshad khan and starring Divvij kak Sweety chhabra Arbaaz Ali Khan, Vikas Anand, Rahul, Dinesh Hingoo and Tej Sapru in lead roles.

== Cast ==
- Divvij kak
- Swity chhabra
- Arbaaz Ali Khan
- Vikas Anand
- Rahul
- Dinesh Hingoo
- Tej Sapru

== Music ==
1. "Pehli Nazar Ka Pyaar Hai" - Shaan, Shreya Ghoshal
2. "Kya Ho Raha Hai, Mujhe Samajh Mein Na Aaye" - Kumar Sanu, Shreya Ghoshal
3. "Dil Ki Baraabyon Ke Qaraar Aa Gaya" - Kumar Sanu, Shreya Ghoshal
4. "Maahiya - Maine Dil Haan Tujhe De Diya" - Shaan, Kalpana
5. "Oh Sonia - Main Nigaahon Se Tere Dil Mein Uttar Jaoonga" - Shaan, Javed Ali, Pamela Jain
6. "Har Imtihaan De Doon" - Madhushree
7. "Tu Ishwar, Tu Hee Maalik Tuhi Allh Bismillah" - Shahzaar
