= Rahula (disambiguation) =

Rāhula was the son of Siddhārtha Gautama (commonly known as the Buddha).

Rahula may also refer to:

- Rahula, Estonia, a village in Harju County, Estonia
- Rahula College, a boys' school in Sri Lanka
- Sri Rahula College, a school at Katugastota, Kandy in Sri Lanka
- Rahula (gastropod), a genus of snails in the family Ariophantidae

== People with the surname ==
- Barys Rahula (1920–2005), Belarusian political activist
- Walpola Rahula Thero (1907–1997), Sri Lankan Buddhist monk, scholar and writer

== See also ==
- Rahul, an Indian name
  - Shah Rukh Khan, Indian film actor who often plays characters named Rahul
- Rahul (film), 2001 Indian film directed by Prakash Jha
