= Rahul Roy (accountant) =

- Born: 4 October 1963; Kolkata, India
- Died: 18 November 2009 (aged 46)
- Occupation: Chartered Accountant

Rahul Roy (4 October 1963 – 18 November 2009) was an Indian chartered accountant and the former President of ICAI.

== Career ==
In 1998, Rahul Roy, a former president of the Institute of Chartered Accountants of India (ICAI) became the youngest person ever to head the ICAI, the second largest professional institute in the World, at 34 years of age. Earlier Rahul had been the chairman of the ICAI's Eastern Region when he was 31 years old. The highly acclaimed "campus interview" scheme was introduced by Rahul when he chaired the Committee for Members in Industry of the ICAI. On behalf of India, Rahul executed a landmark MoU with the Kingdom of Nepal to assist in developing the profession of chartered accountancy there. Rahul also conceived and executed bilateral agreements with the Italian, Russian, Kyrgyzstan and Ukrainian professional bodies, for development of the Auditing and Accounting profession. Rahul served a full term on the Ethics committee of the International Federation of Accountants (IFAC), New York and actively participated in the evolution of the "risks-threat-safeguards" framework of addressing Auditor Independence.

He served on the Steering Committee (later renamed Advisory Committee) on Extractive Industries, of the International Accounting Standards Committee (now, International Accounting Standards Board)., London. He was deputed to represent the IFAC's Ethics Committee at the Confederation of Asia Pacific Accountants(CAPA) conference at Philippines, and the Eastern Central and South African Accountants (ECSAFA) conference at Nairobi as a speaker. He chaired all the three standing committees of ICAI (the examination, executive and disciplinary committees), the last of which is invested with the power of seeking evidence and summonsing, equivalent to a High Court in India.

He served on a number of committees set up by the Reserve Bank of India (India's central bank), the Securities Exchange Board of India (India's securities regulator) and the Government of India. He was a member of the Advisory Board of the Comptroller and Auditor General of India (C&AG, the Supreme Audit Authority in India).

He was a member of the World Bank Team's Mission to the State of Karnataka in the year 2000 (?).

== Professional life ==
Roy was the youngest-ever President of the Institute of Chartered Accountants of India and after his tenure, he joined Ernst & Young as Director in 1999.

== Personal life ==
Roy has been the general secretary of the Calcutta Debating Society. His ancestry included Welsh, Bengali and Assamese lines.

He died on 19 November 2009 in Kolkata and is survived by his wife Soma and daughter Rohini Roy. His daughter Rohini has authored his biography "Remembering Baba" which has been published by Penguin India.
