= Rahul Prasad =

Rahul Prasad can refer to:

- Rahul Prasad (cricketer, born 1982), a cricketer
- Rahul Prasad (cricketer, born 1993), a cricketer
