= Umachal rock cave =

Cave in Assam, India

The Umachal rock cave is a fifth-century rock cave with inscriptions discovered in Kalipur, Guwahati in February 2012. The inscriptions were done during the rule of king Mahendra Varman of Kamarupa. The interior side of the cave measures 6.26x5.02 metres. Once temple of Balabhadra swami, two pieces of a broken stone bowl measuring 16.5 cm in diameter have been found inside the cave. Floral carving measuring 76x73x16 cm were drawn on the rock surface.

== See also ==
- Umachal rock inscription
- Kamakhya Temple
- Kamakhya locality
