= Rahul Kumar =

Rahul Kumar may refer to:

- Rahul Kumar (politician) (born 1984), Indian politician
- Rahul Kumar (footballer) (born 1985), Indian footballer
- Rahul Kumar (actor) (born 1995), Indian actor
- Rahul Kumar (cricketer) (born 2003), Indian cricketer
