= Rahul Sharma =

Rahul Sharma may refer to:

- Rahul Sharma (actor), Indian actor
- Rahul Sharma (Gujarat police), Indian police officer
- Rahul Sharma (Hong Kong cricketer) (born 1960), Hong Kong cricketer
- Rahul Sharma (cricketer, born 1986), Indian cricketer
- Rahul Sharma (cricketer, born 1996), Indian cricketer
- Rahul Sharma (musician) (born 1972), Indian musician
