= Daojali Hading =

Archaeological site in India

Location of Daojali Hading site

Daojali Hading is a Neolithic site in Dima Hasao District of Assam, on a low hillock about 1000 feet above sea level, dated to about 2,700 years before present. Excavated in 1961-63 by a team led by M C Goswami and T C Sharma, it is the first stratified neolithic site discovered in Northeast . The excavation yielded typical shouldered celts and cord-marked pottery. The cord-marked pottery is a unique characteristic that this site shares with Sarutaru and other Northeast Indian Neolithic sites that is rare in the Indian Neolithic cultures—suggesting East and Southeast Asian cultural affinities, Hoabinhian in particular.

== Artifacts ==
The trial trench revealed that the site was single habitation—an unbroken two and a half feet deep cultural layer between an undisturbed brown earth and a layer of humus. Pottery shreds and stone implements are scattered throughout the cultural layer. All ceramic materials are in fragments and cannot be utilized for reconstruction. They are of four types: cord-marked, incised, stamped, and plain fine red ware. The plain fine red ware are made from well prepared fine clay on a turning device, whereas the other types are made from coarse and impure clay tempered with quartz and sandstone grits and beaten into shape with tools. Situated near Brahmaputra Valley close to routes leading into China and Myanmar. Extensive digging at the site has yielded polished stone tools, ceramics and kitchen items such as grinders, pestles and mortars. Jadeite stone was also found that must have been transported from China. A large number of pots have also been found. These findings suggest that the people there were growing and storing grains, and preparing food from it. According to historians, Neolithic phase here maybe as late as early Common Era centuries. Also common finds of tools made of fossil wood (ancient wood that has hardened into stone), and pottery.
