= Rahul Prasad (cricketer, born 1982) =

Indian cricketer (born 1982)

Rahul Prasad (born 3 January 1982) was an Indian cricketer. He was a left-handed batsman and right-arm medium-pace bowler who played for Jharkhand. He was born in Delhi.

Having made his cricketing debut for Uttar Pradesh Under-19s back in the 1998–99 season, Prasad made just a single first-class appearance, for Jharkhand against Madhya Pradesh during the 2007-08 Ranji Trophy. From the opening order, he failed to score a run in either innings in which he batted.
