= Umachal rock inscription =

5th-century rock inscription in Assam

The Umachal rock inscription is one of the earliest epigraphic sources discovered in Assam. Dated to the 5th century, the rock description was discovered in the north-eastern slopes of the Nilachal Hills (called Umachal), near Guwahati city. The artifact is dated primarily on the basis of the identification of the named Surendravarman with Mahendravarman (fl. c. 470–494) of the Varman dynasty. The script is in the Nagari variety of the Gupta script and the language is Sanskrit prose. Though the Nilachal Hills is known for the Kamakhya Temple, a shakta/tantra site, this temple was for Balabhadra, a god of the Vaishnavite pantheon.

The Umachal rock inscription

Another inscription, the Nagajari-Khanikargaon rock inscription, though undated, is sometimes claimed, on stylistic grounds, as the earliest.

== Text ==
mahārājādhirāja-śrī
surendravarmmaṇā-kr̥tma
bhagavataḥ-valabhadra
svmināya-idaṁ-guhaṁ

=== Translation ===
"This cave (-temple) of the illustrious Lord Balabhadra has been constructed by Maharajadhiraja Sri Surendra Varman."

== See also ==
- Umachal rock cave
- Kamarupa inscriptions
