= Kamarupa inscriptions =

Medieval Indian inscriptions

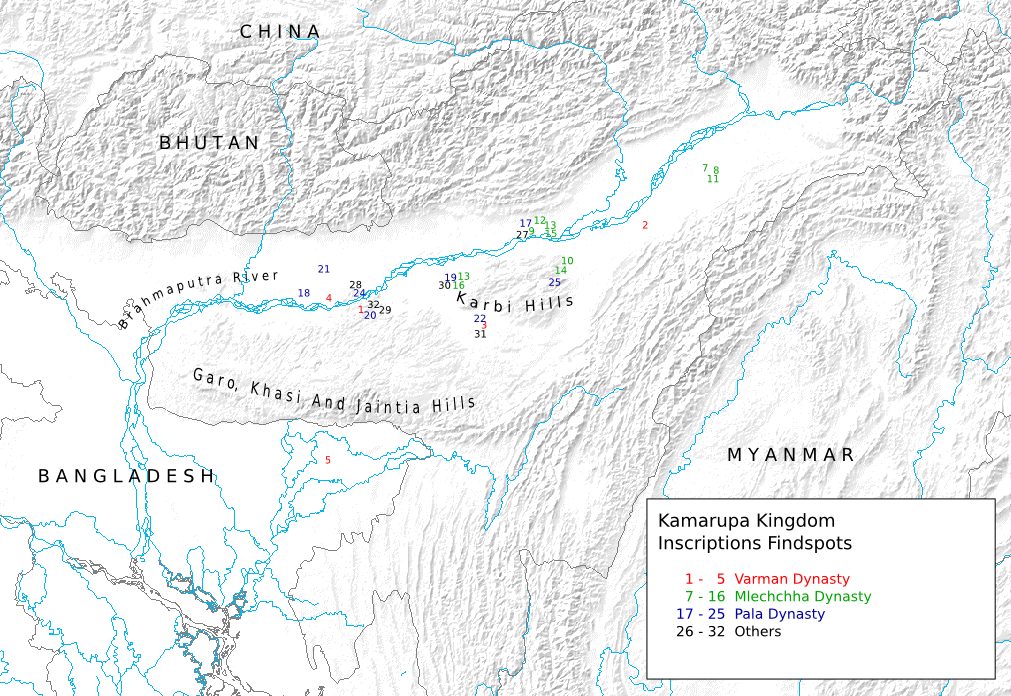
The findspots of inscriptions associated with the Kamarupa kingdom give an estimate of its geographical location and extent.

The Kamarupa inscriptions are a number of 5th-century to early 13th-century rock, copper plate and clay seal inscriptions associated with the rulers and their subordinates of the Kamarupa region. The common language of these inscriptions is Sanskrit. The earliest of these inscriptions, the Umachal and Nagajari-Khanikargaon rock inscriptions, belong to the 5th century and written in a script which was nearly identical to the eastern variety of the Gupta script. There is a steady evolution in the script over the centuries, and last of the scripts, for example the Kanai-boroxiboa inscription using a proto-Assamese script. The script in this period is called the Kamarupi script, which continues development as the Medieval Assamese script from the 13th to the 19th century and emerges as the modern Assamese script.

9th-century Nagaon Copper Plate Inscription of Valavarman III. Text: trailokya vijaya tuṅga yenāpahṛtaṃ yaśo mahendrasya Kāmarūpe jitakāmarūpaḥ prāgjyotiṣākhyaṃ puramadhyuvāsa rājāprajāraṇjana labdhavarṇṇo.

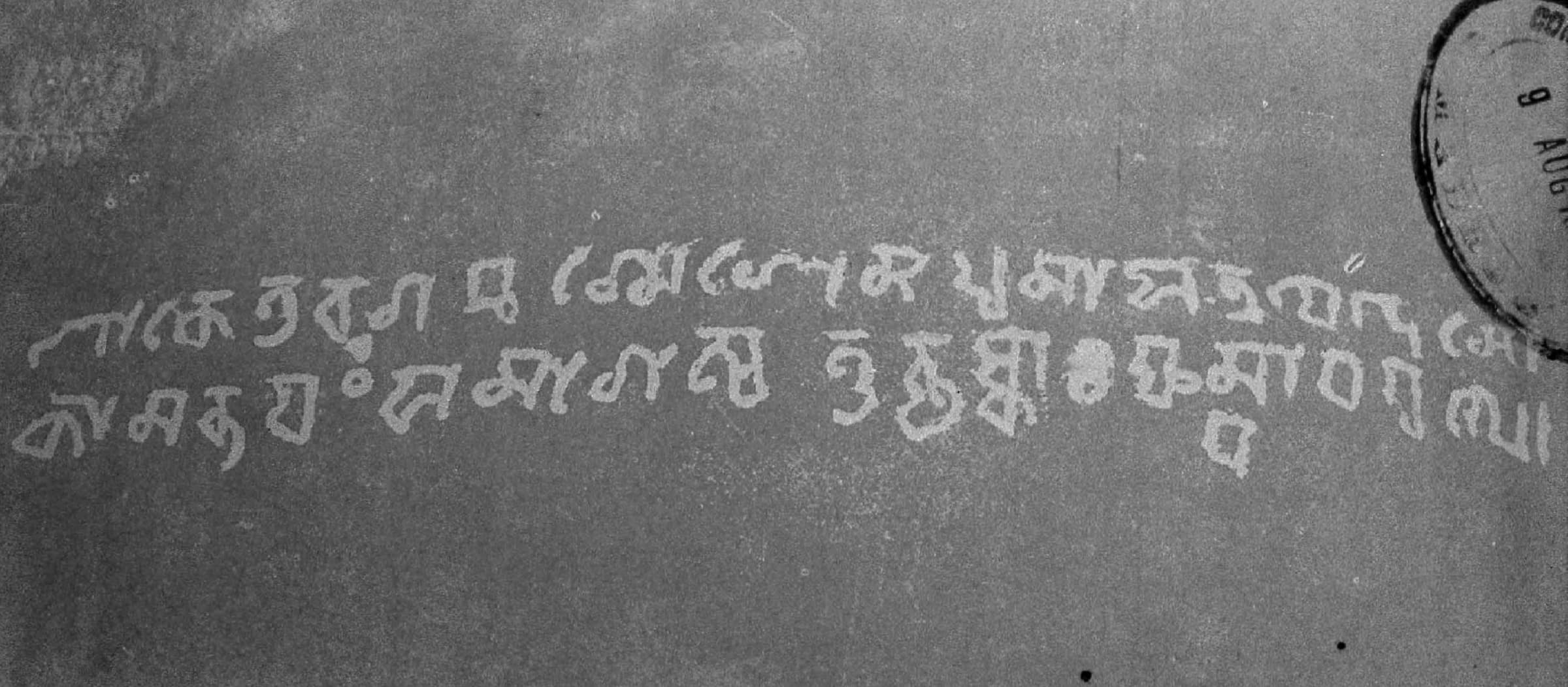
Kanai-boroxiboa rock inscription, 1207 CE, shows proto-Assamese script.

Though the language is Sanskrit, there appear systematic Prakriticisms that indicate an underlying colloquial Indo-Aryan language, called Kamarupi Prakrit.

== List of inscriptions ==
The list below is from (Lahiri 1991, pp. 26–27), and the numbers in the list correspond to the ones given in the find spot map.

	Name	Kind	Ruler	Date	Find spot	Find Year
1	Umachal	Rock	Surendravarman	5th century	Nilachal Hills, Guwahati	
2	Nagajari-Khanikargaon	Rock	-	5th century	Khanikargaon, Golaghat	
3	Barganga	Rock	Bhutivarman	6th century	Barganga river, Nagaon	
4	Dubi	Copper plate	Bhaskarvarman	7th century	Dubi village, Kamrup	
5	Nidhanpur	Copper plate	Bhaskarvarman	7th century	Nidhanpur village, Sylhet, Bangladesh	
6	Nalanda	Clay seals	Bhaskarvarman	7th century	Nalanda, site-1, monastery 1	
7	Sankara Narayana	Image	Sri Jivara	8th century	Deopani, Golaghat	
8	Hari-Hara	Image	Diglekhavarman	8th century	Deopani, Golaghat	
9	Tezpur	Rock	Harjaravarman	830 CE	Tezpur	
10	Hayunthal	Copper plate	Harjaravarman	9th century	Hayunthal, Karbi Hills	
11	Deopani Vishnu	Image	-	9th century	Deopani, Golaghat	
12	Tezpur	Copper plate	Vanamalavarmadeva	9th century	Tezpur	
13a	Parbatiya	Copper plate	Vanamalavarmadeva	9th century	Parbatiya village, Tezpur	
13b	Kaliabor	Copper plate	Vanamalavarmadeva	9th century	Dighali village, Nagaon	
14	Uttarbarbil	Copper plate	Balavarman III	9th century	Uttarbarbil village, Karbi Hills	
15	Ulubari	Copper plate	Balavarman III	9th century	Ulubari village, Darrang	
16	Nagaon	Copper plate	Balavarman III	9th century	Sutargaon village, Nagaon	
17	Bargaon	Copper plate	Ratnapala	1035 CE	Naharhabi village, Tezpur	
18	Suwalkuci	Copper plate	Ratnapala	1036 CE	Suwalkuci village, Kamrup	
19	Coratbari	Copper plate	Ratnapala	11th century	Coratbari village, Nagaon	
20	Gauhati	Copper plate	Indrapala	1058	Barpanara village, Kamrup	
21	Guwakuci	Copper plate	Indrapala	1071	Guwakuci village, Nalbari	
22	Gachtal	Copper plate	Gopalavarman	1080	Gachtal village, Nagaon	
23	Subhankarapataka	Copper plate	Dharmapala	12th century	(not known)	
24	Pushpabhadra	Copper plate	Dharmapala	12th century	Pushpabhadra river bed, North Guwahati	
25	Khonamukh	Copper plate	Dharmapala	12th century	Khonamukh village, Nagaon	
26	Kamauli	Copper plate	Vaidyadeva	1142	Kamauli, Uttar Pradesh	
27	Assam	Copper plate	Vallabhadeva	1185	Tezpur	
28	Kanai-Boroxiboa	Rock	(not known)	1206	North Guwahati	
29	Ambari	Stone	Samudrapala	12th-13th centuries	Guwahati	
30	Gachtal	Pillar	(not known)	12th-13th centuries	Gachtal, Nagaon	
31	Surya	Image	(not known)	9th century	Kaki, Nagaon	
32	Gauhati	Copper bell	Srikumara	8th century	Guwahati	
