= Nagajari-Khanikargaon rock inscription =

5th-century land grant

The Nagajari-Khanikargaon rock inscription.

The Nagajari-Khanikargaon rock inscription is a 5th-century land grant discovered in the Nagajari area of the Golaghat district. The artifact is fragmentary, with inscriptions in Sanskrit written in the eastern variety of the Brahmi script. In style, language, and script, the inscription is very similar to the Umachal and Barganga rock inscriptions. Additionally, since it betrays no influence of a local Prakrit, this inscription is often placed earlier than the Umachal rock inscription. It also indicates that Indo-Aryan culture had spread to the Golaghat region by the 5th century. It is also speculated that it might belong to a different dynasty unrelated to the Varmans of Kamarupa. It's a wonderful Rock which is now kept in Sarupathar College, Golaghat.

== Text ==
The text is fragmentary, with no complete sentence available, though it is believed it was written in the sloka meter. Since the text is fragmentary, no English translation is available. Nevertheless, it is ascertained that the inscription is related to a grant of land, with the area bounded by "Dibrumukkhada" (a water body) in the east and a Banyan tree in the west.

== Discovery ==
The rock inscription was collected by Luduram Saikia of Khanikargaon among some ruins in the Nagajari area prior to 1972. Around 1972, this stone fragment was noticed by M K Saikia at Saikia's residence, when it was reported.
