= Brahmaputra Valley =

Region of India

- Assam Valley
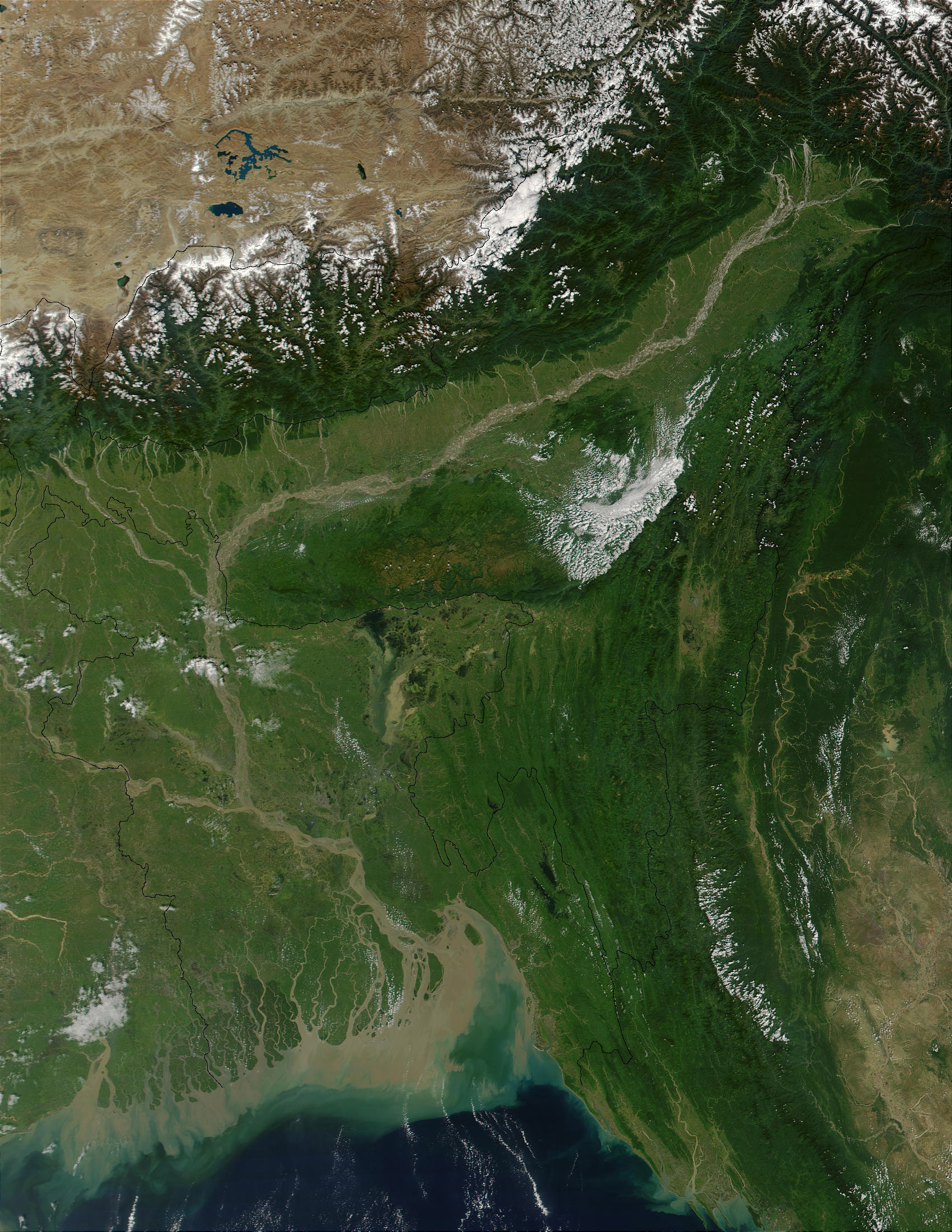
- Valley of the Brahmaputra River in Assam, India.

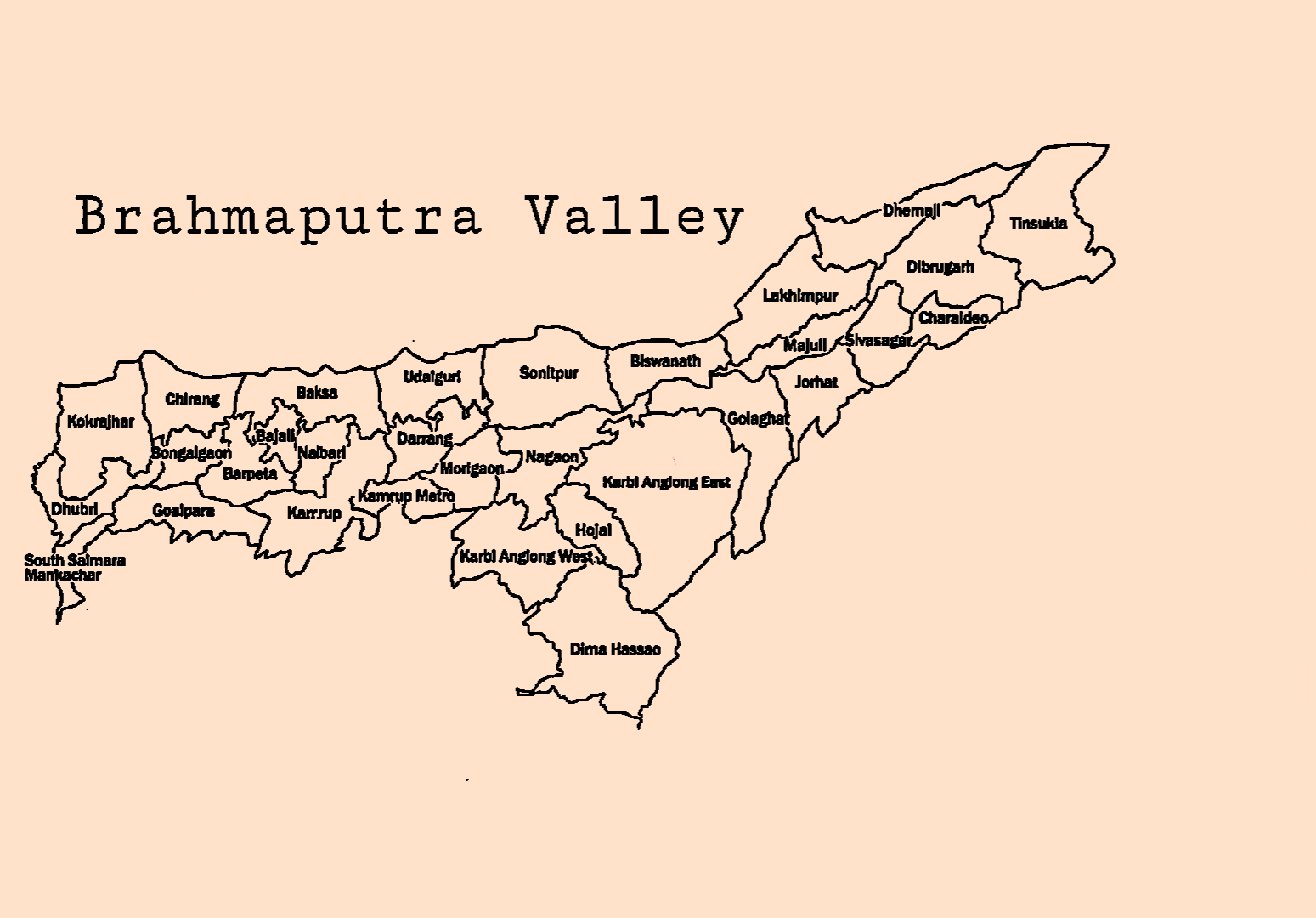
- Map of Brahmaputra Valley districts.
- Length: 600 km (373 mi) North-East
- Width: 80 km (50 mi)

Geography
- Location: Assam, India
- Coordinates: 26.5983°N 92.4506°E

The Brahmaputra Valley (also Assam Valley) is a region situated between hill ranges of the eastern Himalayan range of Assam in Northeastern India.

The valley consists of the Western Brahmaputra Valley covering the regions of Goalpara and Kamrup; Central Brahmaputra Valley region covering Darrang, Nagaon and the North Bank and Eastern Brahmaputra Valley comprising districts of Sonitpur, Lakhimpur, Dibrugarh and Sivasagar. The Teesta River in North Bengal also drains into Brahmaputra River.

The Brahmaputra Valley has a total area of 71,516 km^{2} with containing 30 districts. Brahmaputra Valley with its rainforest-like climate contains some of the most productive soils in the world. The Brahmaputra River flows from Assam to Bangladesh where it meets the Ganges River to form the world's largest delta and finally flows into the Bay of Bengal in the south.

== Demography ==
The people native to the Brahmaputra Valley are Hindus, mostly speaking the Assamese language. The valley is more populous and prosperous than the rest of the region because of its accessibility to the rest of the country. The Brahmaputra Valley has a population of 27,580,977 as per the 2011 census.

=== Languages ===
Languages spoken in Brahmaputra Valley (2011)
1. Assamese (Official) (55.7%)
2. Bengali (22.1%)
3. Hindi (7.60%)
4. Bodo (5.13%)
5. Others (9.52%)

The population of the Brahmaputra Valley is 27,580,977 according to the 2011 census report by the Assam government. Assamese is the official language of the Brahmaputra Valley and is spoken by 15.1 million people comprising 55.65% of the valley population. Bengali is spoken by 6.09 million people representing 22.1% of the valley, Hindi is spoken by 2.1 million comprising 7.61% of the region, Bodo is spoken by 1.41 million comprising 5.13% of the valley's population and 2.88 million people speak various indigenous tribal languages of Assam, such as Santali, Karbi, Lalung, Hmar, Deori, Rabha, Mishing, Koch, Rajbangshi, Sadri, Garo, Dimasa, Gondi, Savara, Gorkha, Halam, Ao and Motak.

=== Religion ===
Religions in the Brahmaputra Valley (2011)
1. Hinduism (63.0%)
2. Islam (32.3%)
3. Christianity (4.01%)
4. Others (0.73%)

Out of 27,580,977 people living in the Brahmaputra Valley, a majority of 17,368,618 profess to the Hindu faith, a large minority of 8,934,387 people profess to the Islamic faith, 1,107,192 people profess to the Christian faith and around 170,780 people profess to other faiths such as Buddhism, Jainism, Sikhism and Animism.

== Major cities ==
The major cities in the valley are Guwahati, the largest city of Northeast India and Dibrugarh, the largest city in Upper Assam.

List of Cities of Brahmaputra Valley by population and other features (2011) -:

1. Guwahati (metro) – 968,549 (1st rank),
2. Dibrugarh – 154,296 (2nd rank),
3. Jorhat – 153,889 (3rd rank),
4. Nagaon – 155,889 (4th rank),
5. Tinsukia – 126,389 (6th rank)
6. Tezpur – 102,505 (7th rank),
7. Rangia – 40,000 (largest transport city – 1st rank).

== See also ==
- Barak Valley
