= Bhauma dynasty =

Legendary dynasty in Hinduism

- Status: Legendary
Preceded by
Danava dynasty

The Bhauma dynasty is the second legendary dynasty of Pragjyotisha, after the Danava dynasty. Narakasura, who is said to have established this dynasty, and his descendants Bhagadatta and Vajradatta are first mentioned in the epics Mahabharata and the Ramayana in the sections that were composed in the first few centuries though they place them variously in either northwestern or eastern India. Narakasura's legend is further embellished in the locally composed Kalika Purana (10th–12th century), the Yogini Tantra (16th/17th century) and local lores and the legends became firmly attached to Assam and North Bengal. The late embellishment of the Naraka legends point to legitimization of the three dynasties of the Kamarupa kings.

According to the 10th-century Kalika Purana, the dynasty was established by Naraka of Videha, by removing the Kirata chief Ghataka, the last of the Danava dynasty. The development of the details of the Naraka story are considered as myths though historically he could have been a native Kirata chief, or a Hinduized tribal youth. The glorification and assimilation of a local chief and the making of myths follow a pattern that is observed in other parts of India. The last ruler, Suparna, was killed by his ministers. The existence of this dynasty is not supported by any tenable evidence.

== Rulers ==
	Name	succession	Queen
1	Naraka	son of Bhumi and Vishnu	Maya (Princess of Vidarbha)
2	Bhagadatta	son of Naraka	-
3	Pushpadatta	son of Bhagadatta	-
4	Vajradatta	son of Bhagadatta	-

== Bibliography ==
- Das, Paromita (2005). "The Naraka Legends, Aryanisation and the "varnasramadharma" in the Brahmaputra Valley". Proceedings of the Indian History Congress. 66. Indian History Congress: 224–230. ISSN 2249-1937. JSTOR 44145840.
- Das, Sneha (2014). "Engraved Histories: A Study of Legend of Naraka and Political Legitimacy in the Kamarupa Region". Proceedings of the Indian History Congress. 75. Indian History Congress: 153–159. ISSN 2249-1937. JSTOR 44158374.
- Sen, Debasis (1984). "Ethnic Elements in the Political Life of Ancient Assam". Proceedings of the Indian History Congress. 45. Indian History Congress: 101–106. ISSN 2249-1937. JSTOR 44140186.
- Sircar, D C (1990), "Epico-Puranic Myths and Allied Legends", in Barpujari, H K (ed.), The Comprehensive History of Assam, vol. I, Guwahati: Publication Board, Assam, pp. 79–93
- Shin, Jae-Eun (2018), "Region Formed and Imagined: Reconsidering temporal, spatial and social context of Kamarupa", in Dzüvichü, Lipokmar; Baruah, Manjeet (eds.), Modern Practices in North East India: History, Culture, Representation, London & New York: Routledge, pp. 23–55
- Tripathi, Chandra Dhar (2008). Kāmarūpa-Kaliṅga-Mithilā: a politico-cultural alignment in Eastern India : history, art, traditions. Indian Institute of Advanced Study. ISBN 9788173053276.
