= Vajradatta =

Asura king in Hindu mythology

Vajradatta (Sanskrit: वज्रदत्त, romanized: Vajradatta) is an asura king in Hindu mythology. He is the son and successor of King Bhagadatta, and the third ruler of the Naraka dynasty of the Pragjyotisha Kingdom. Vajradatta is regarded to have studied the four Vedas along with the disciplines called the Angas, as well as the Nitishastras of Brihaspati and Shukra. Vajradatta is mentioned in epics as powerful as Indra, speedy like Vajra and who pleased the performer of hundred sacrifices, who is Indra again, in battle. He said to possess bolt-like lustre and conquered enemies like Indra.

== Literature ==
=== Mahabharata ===
The Ashvamedha Parva of the Mahabharata offers an account of Vajradatta. He is described to have not accompanied his father Bhagadatta in the Kurukshetra War, which occurred during his childhood. When King Yudhishthira performed his ashvamedha yajna to achieve imperial sovereignty, his brother Arjuna was appointed as the guard of the ceremonial horse. The horse, after traversing different countries, travelled eastward to Pragjyotisha, which was ruled by the Vajradatta. Vajradatta made an attempt to hold the horse to avenge his father's humiliation in the war at the hands of Arjuna. He was defeated by Arjuna, after a prolonged battle.

Vajradatta is also mentioned in the Kalika Purana and Harshacharita. In the Kalika Purana, Vajradatta and Pushpadatta are stated to be the sons of Bhagadatta. In the Harshacharita, Vajradatta is stated to be the ruler of his realm after Bhagadatta and Pushpadatta.

== Inscriptions ==
In Kamarupa inscriptions, the Naraka, Bhagadatta and Vajradatta were mentioned as ancestors of Kamarupa kings. One such inscription is Nidhanpur inscription of Bhaskar Varman.

== See also ==
- Naraka dynasty
