= Danava dynasty =

Legendary dynasty of Pragjyotisha (India)

- Status: Legendary
| Succeeded by |
| Bhauma dynasty |

The Danava dynasty was the first legendary line of rulers in Pragjyotisha, established by Mahiranga Danava. The dynasty was of Kirata origin. These rulers are mentioned in the Kalika Purana but there are no archaeological evidence to support this.

The Danava dynasty consisted of Kirata chiefs; the last of whom, Ghatakasura, was killed and replaced by Naraka.

== Chronology ==
| Nu. | Name of Known rulers |
|---|---|
| 1 | Mahiranga |
| 2 | Hatakasura |
| 3 | Sambarasura |
| 4 | Ratnasura |
| 5 | Ghatakasura |
