= Mura (danava) =

Asura in Hindu mythology

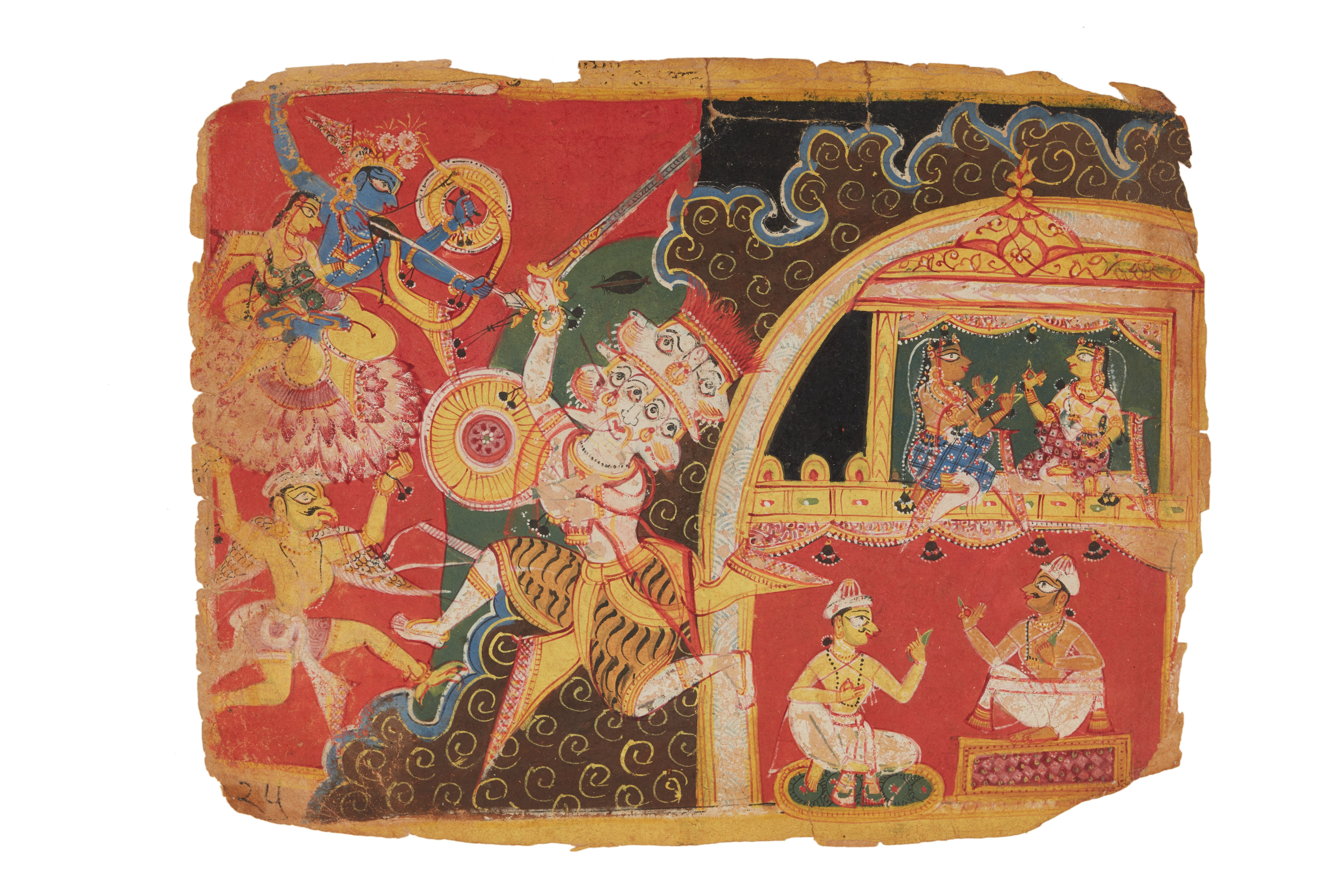
- Battle Between Krishna and the Fire-Headed Demon Mura, folio from the Bhagavata Purana
- Affiliation: Asura, Danava
- Texts: Mahabharata, Bhagavata Purana
- Parents: Kashyapa (father), Danu (mother)

Mura (Sanskrit: मुर, romanized: Mura) is an asura in Hindu mythology. An ally of Narakasura, the ruler of Pragjyotisha, he defends the city against Krishna, by whom he is slain.

== Legend ==
Mura was born to the sage Kashyapa and his wife Danu. He became the guardian of the city of Pragyotisha, the capital of Narakasura, fortifying the perimeter of the city with 6,000 iron snares to repel invasions. He fathered 4,000 sons.

Distressed after seeing corpses of asuras slain by the devas, Mura feared death and performed intense penance for years to propitiate Brahma. When Brahma appeared, Mura requested that anyone he touched during battle, even an immortal, would immediately die, a boon the deity granted. Emboldened by this boon, Mura embarked on a digvijaya (conquest of the quarters). He went to Mount Meru and challenged the yakshas and gandharvas, who refused to fight him. He then marched on Amaravati and challenged Indra. Recognising Mura's might, Indra abandoned his realm and withdrew to the southern banks of the Yamuna river. Mura occupied Amaravati, and seized Indra's elephant Airavata and his thunderbolt Vajra. Later, riding Airavata to Earth, Mura interrupted a yajna conducted by King Raghu, demanding that Raghu either fight him or cease worshipping the devas. Sage Vashistha intervened, advising Mura to instead challenge Yama, the god of death. Mura travelled to Yama's realm, demanding that he cease taking lives. Yama agreed to do so if he were able to successfully defeat Vishnu.

When Krishna learned of the atrocities committed by Narakasura, including the theft of Aditi's earrings and his abduction of 16,100 women, he mounted Garuda with his consort Satyabhama and flew to Pragjyotisha. Krishna destroyed the city's outer fortifications using his mace, and cut through Mura's snares with his discus and sword. Awakened by the blast of Krishna's conch, the five-headed Mura rose from the waters surrounding the city and attacked with his trident and mace. Krishna intercepted Mura's weapons and severed his five heads with his discus. This act earned Krishna the epithet Murari (slayer of Mura). Following Mura's death, his seven sons and their commander attempted to avenge him, but Krishna destroyed their weapons and slew them before proceeding to defeat Narakasura.
