= Supratika =

Name of various elephants in Hindu mythology

Supratika (Sanskrit: सुप्रतीक, romanized: Supratīka) is the name of many kings, sages and legendary figures, including three different famous elephants in Hindu mythology, foremost among whom is listed as one of the Ashtadiggajas, each representing the eight quarters of the universe. The Hindu epic Mahabharata describes two more elephants by the same name – an elephant that was an incarnation of a sage, and the one that belonged to Bhagadatta, the king of Pragjyotisha.

== Supratika (Ashtadiggajas) ==
The Amarakosha, a thesaurus of Sanskrit, mentions the names of eight male elephants that bear the world together, as Airavata, Pundarika, Vamana, Kumunda, Anjana, Pushpadanta, Sarvabhauma, and Supratika. Supratika represents the north-east direction, the quarter of Soma. Anjanavati is described to be the wife of Supratika.

== Supratika (Bhagadatta's elephant) ==
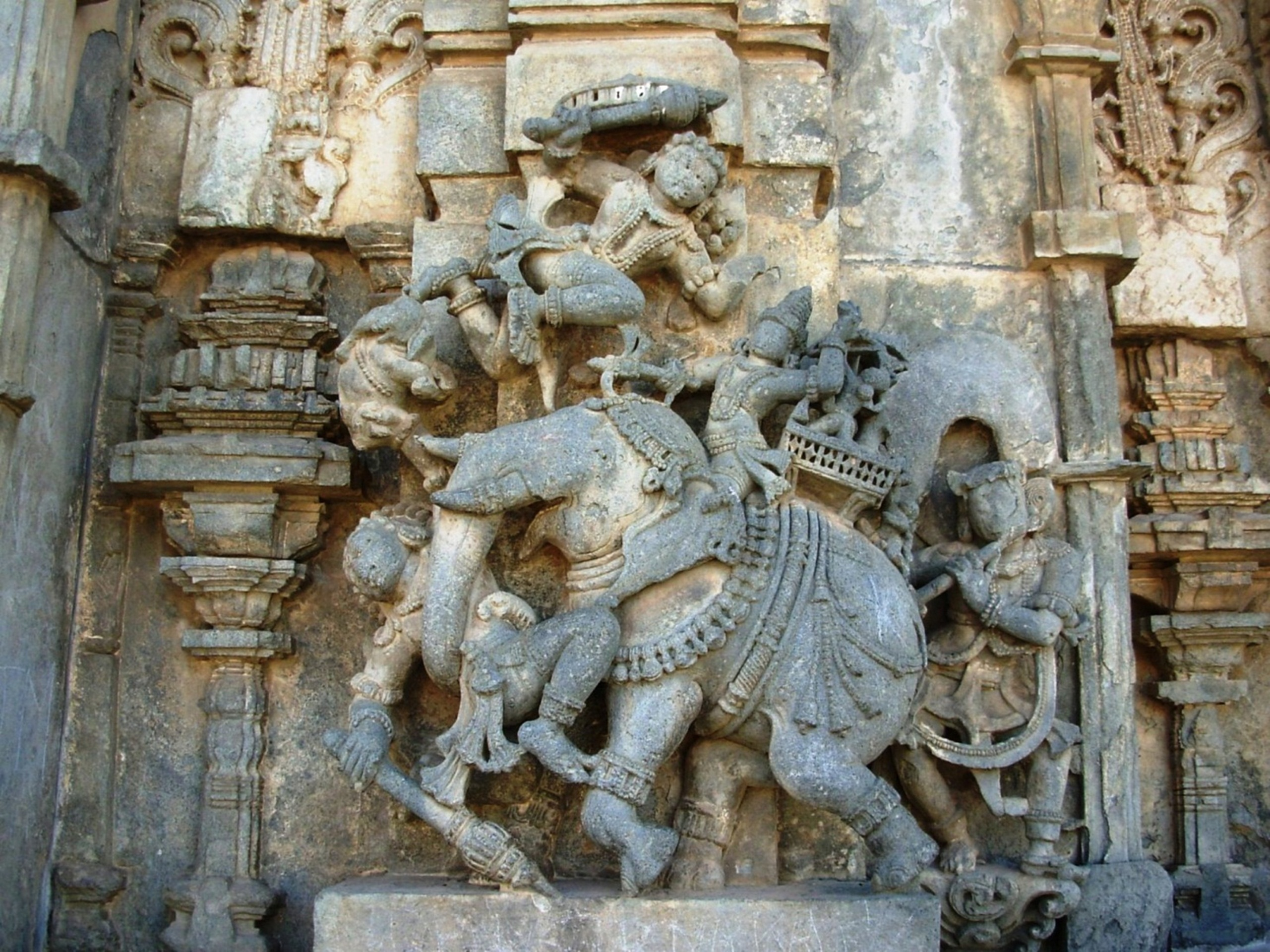
A sculpture of Bhagadatta, seated on Supratika and fighting with Bhima, at the Chennakesava Temple, Belur.

On the twelfth day of the Kurukshetra War, Duryodhana sent a large elephant division against Bhima. Bhima killed all the elephants with his mace. This created a havoc among the Kaurava army and they fled for their life in all directions. Angered by this, the king of Pragjyotisha, Bhagadatta, seated on Supratika, charged against Bhima. The elephant rushed forward and crushed Bhima's chariot into pieces, killing his charioteer and horses. Bhima escaped destruction by jumping off his chariot. He got underneath the elephant and severed its vital points causing exceeding pain. Enraged at this, the elephant grew mad and tried to throw him off. In an instant, it caught Bhima with its trunk and was about to crush him under the knees. But Bhima managed to escape from its hold and again got underneath the elephant and in between its limbs and started attacking it. Bhima was hopeful that another elephant from the Pandava side would come for his rescue. When he got underneath the elephant for the second time, hiding in between its legs, the Kaurava army thought he had been slain by the beast.

Yudhishthira, Bhima's elder brother, was struck with grief and urged his forces to destroy Bhagadatta and Supratika. The king of Dasarna charged against them. In the great battle that took place between Supratika and Dasarna's elephant, Supratika crushed Dasarna's elephant to death. Utilising his time, Bhima emerged from beneath Supratika and fled. The Pandava army was relieved when they saw Bhima alive.

Supratika was later killed the same day, by Arjuna's arrows, who also later killed its rider, Bhagadatta.

== Supratika (sage) ==
The legend of Sage Supratika, the younger brother of Vibhavasu, is described in the Skanda Purana. The two brothers are described to have been hostile towards each other ever since their birth. Once, the sages grew furious during a monetary dispute and exchanged curses: Vibhavasu cursed Supratika to become an elephant, and Supratika cursed Vibhavasu to become a tortoise. The elephant Supratika is described to have become six yojanas tall and twelve yojanas wide. Engaged in battle along a lake, the two animals were seized by Garuda, who took them in his claws to a mountain and ate them on the advice of his father Kashyapa.
