= Asura kingdom =

- Status: Mythical

Asura kingdom, or Sonitpura kingdom, is a mythological kingdom that is mentioned in a multiple of Hindu epics which later came to be associated with modern-day Tezpur in central Assam and Banasura Hill in Kerala. The kingdom was contemporary of Pragjyotisha. In Puranic literature, Pragjyotisha and Sonitpura were located to the north-west of the Indian subcontinent in what is modern-day Punjab and Sindh. In Assam, the name of the legendary kingdom might be applied to the local inhabitants who were outside of the Hindu fold. In Kalika purana, Banasura, the last ruler of the asura kingdom is represented as an anti-Brahminical character.

== Dynasty ==
| | Name |
|---|---|
| 1 | Marichi |
| 2 | Kashyap |
| 3 | Hiranyakashipu |
| 4 | Prahlad |
| 5 | Virochana |
| 6 | Mahabali |
| 7 | Bana |

== See also ==
- Pragjyotisha Kingdom
- Mahabharata

== Sources ==
- Caudhurī, Niśipada (1985). Historical archaeology of central Assam. B.R. Publishing.
- Shin, Jae-Eun (2018a), "Redefining Divine Presence: A Study of Hidden Lingas in the Mid-Brahmaputra Valley", in Bopearachchi, Osmund; Ghosh, Suchandra (eds.), Early Indian History and Beyond: Essays in Honour of Professor B.D Chattopadhyaya, Delhi: Primus Books, pp. 313–34
- Shin, Jae-Eun (2018b), "Region Formed and Imagined: Reconsidering temporal, spatial and social context of Kamarupa", in Dzüvichü, Lipokmar; Baruah, Manjeet (eds.), Modern Practices in North East India: History, Culture, Representation, London & New York: Routledge, pp. 23–55
