= Boro Maa Kali Temple, Naihati =

Hindu Temple dedicated to goddess Kali at Naihati, India

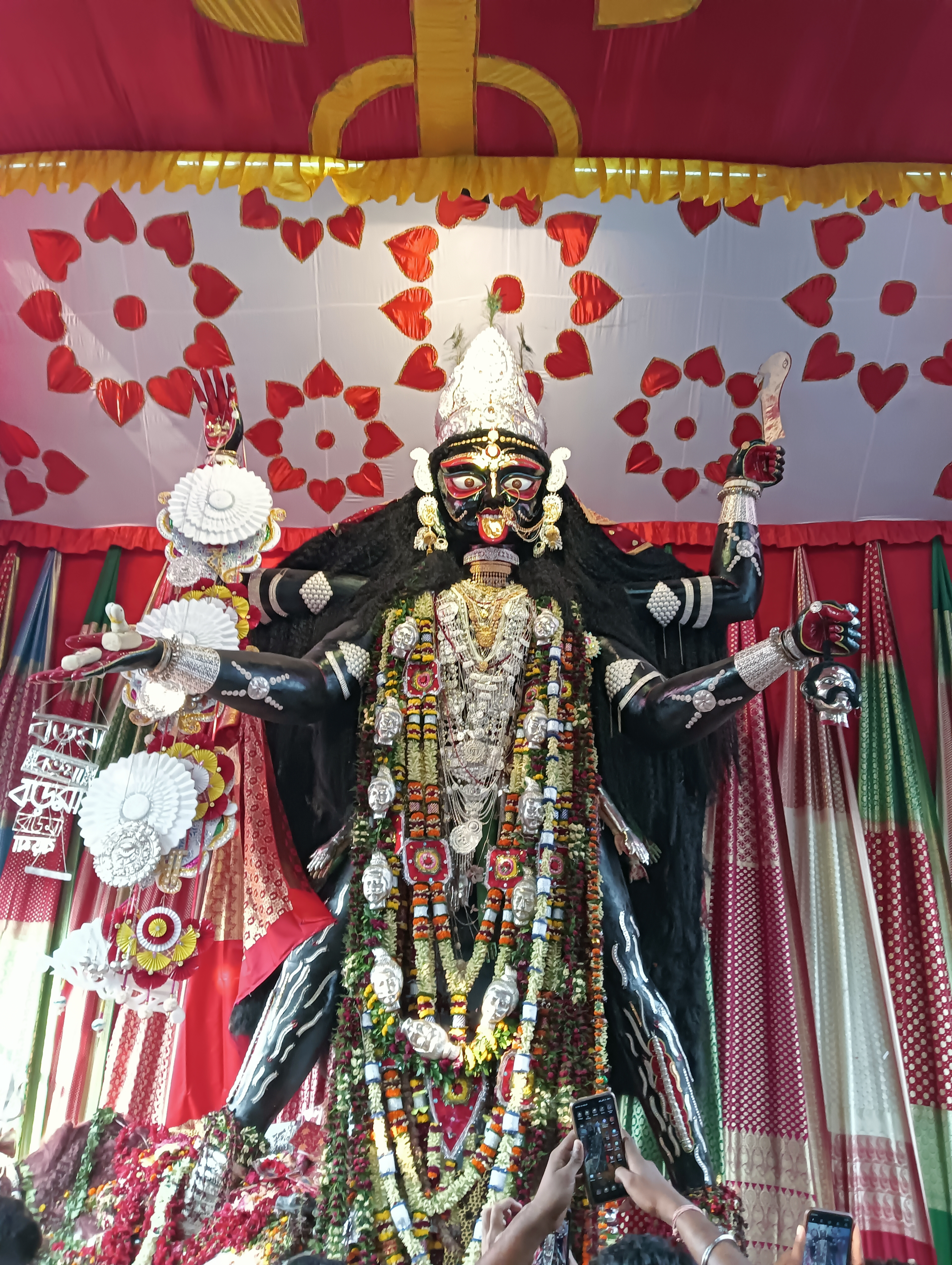
- The deity of Boro Maa during Kali Puja, 2022

- West Bengal

Religion
- Affiliation: Hinduism
- Deity: Boro Maa Kali: Kali Puja; Kaushiki Amavasya; Dipannwita Amavasya; Baisakhi Amavasya
- Governing body: Naihati Barakali Puja Samity Trust

Location
- Location: Naihati
- State: West Bengal
- Country: India
- Interactive map of Boro Maa Kali Temple, Naihati
- Coordinates: 22.8885984°N 88.4143351°E

Architecture
- Type: Bengal architecture
- Completed: 1923

Boro Maa Kali Temple is a Hindu temple in Naihati, North 24 Parganas, West Bengal in India, dedicated to the Hindu goddess Kali, one of the 10 Mahavidyas in the Hindu tantric tradition and the supreme deity in the Kalikula worship tradition.

The temple's history dates a century back to 1923, when a young man named Bhavesh Chakraborty had a dream after visiting Nabadwip and witnessing the grandeur of the idols there. Inspired, he returned to Naihati and built a 22-foot-tall idol of Goddess Kali, which has over the years, come to be known as the "Boro Maa".

In this temple, Maa Kali is worshipped as per the beliefs of Vaishnavism in her fierce form as the pitch-dark Raksha Kali or Shamshan Kali, symbolising destruction and renewal. As per the Devi Bhagavata Purana, Kalika Purana and Shakti Peetha Stotram, it is one of the 52 Shakta pithas in India. Every year it is visited by lakhs of devotees and pilgrims from different parts of India.

== Legend and importance ==
About a century ago, in the early 1900s, a young man named Bhavesh Chakraborty, who was a jute mill employee and social worker, went to experience "Bhanga Rash" at Nabadwip accompanied by four friends. The incredible height and grandeur of the idols in Nabadwip mesmerized him. After returning to his home in Naihati, he had a dream where Maa Kali, at the time a small deity of the Chakraborty family, instructed him to mould her into a gigantic idol of 22 foot, similar to the ones in Nabadwip.

Initially known as the "Boro Kali" or "Bhavesh Kali", the puja was organised by and limited to the Chakraborty household. But, as Boro Kali's popularity soared over the years, the puja was opened up to the general public and the idol was renamed as "Boro Maa", symbolising her as the mother of all.

Highly revered by her devotees, it is widely believed that she fulfills the desire and wishes of all her devotees, irrespective of their caste, social status and economic background. It is widely said "Boro Maa kauke feray na" and "Dhormo jar jar, Boro Maa sobar". Numerous personal experiences of about how their problems were resolved or how they got success in their career soon after visiting Boro Maa's Temple and receiving her blessings, are prevalent far and near in West Bengal.

Since 2014, a local sculptor Shubhendu Sarkar has been sculpting the 22-feet-tall idol every year. While that idol is immersed in the Ganges every year during the visarjan, about a stone's throw away distance from the pandal is a temple, that houses a smaller avatar of Boro Maa's magnificent idol and it is present all-year round. Painted in pink and yellow, the temple was opened in 2014, with a courtyard for devotees for offering their prayers. On 100 years of the puja, the temple recorded the highest number of footfalls, among which more than a lakh devotees did "dandi kata" for fulfilling their wishes.

Before 1970, the massive idol was carried on the shoulders of the strongest men in town, all the way from the pandal to the nearby Ganga for immersion. 1970 onwards, the organisers decided to carry the idol of Boro Maa to the river for immersion, on a wheeled trolley by the townspeople. Thousands of men come together to guide the massive idol along the procession route, adorned with giant sized vibrant garlands crafted by garland makers from Howrah. The garlands are mainly constructed of blood-red hibiscus besides a few garlands made of jasmine, yellow and orange marigold, rose, tuberose and chrysanthemum.

== Boro Maa ==
Every year a 22 feet idol of Maa Kali is moulded, whose foundation is laid on the day of Lakshmi Puja with khuti puja. Built over 15 days, every year the idol is adorned with 12 kilograms of gold and 200 kilograms of silver ornaments. It includes gold bangles, crown, necklace, eye decor, tongue decor, "nupur" and "chandmala". The ornaments have been created from small pieces of jewellery and bindis contributed by people from all walks of life over the 100 years after establishment of the temple. The deity has a dark complexion, four hands, a crimson-red tongue bordered by gold and lotus eyes, which are believed to exude both warmth and strength.

In 2023, a new temple dedicated to the deity was inaugurated on 100 years of the puja. The pran pratishtha of Boro Maa's new idol made of "kasthi pathar" was done on the day Kali puja in the same year. On the occasion of her 101 years of worship in 2024, the deity was offered a silver "ghot" and key which was moulded from 35 to 40 kg of silver, that was donated to Boro Maa by her devotees for the success of their "manots".

Boro Maa's four hands carry symbols with meanings. Her right upper hand is raised in a blessing gesture, offering reassurance to her devotees. The right lower hand holds a "jolbhora sandesh" which signifies sweetness, reward and prosperity to those who lead virtuous lives. Her left upper hand holds her weapon, symbolising her power to eradicate evil while her left lower hand grasps the severed head of a sinner, which is a reminder of wrongdoings. Through these emblems, Boro Maa expresses the dual form of Kali as both nurturing and fearsome, reminding her devotees of the balance between reward and punishment, based on their karma.

== The rituals ==
Her lotus symbolic eyes are believed to a representation of controlled rage. Besides paying offerings to the deity, devotees perform dandi kata to receive her blessings. For five days every year during the Kali puja, the deity is decorated and worshipped according to the traditions and rituals which were first established by Bhavesh Chakraborty and his family. Following Chakraborty's wish till today, no money is collected from locals as chanda to organise the puja. The committee works with the money donated by the devotees. During the five days, no special puja is dedicated to the deity. Everyday on those days, special bhog is offered to the goddess. The bhog that is offered to Boro Maa always comes from the family of Bhavesh Chakraborty's successors.

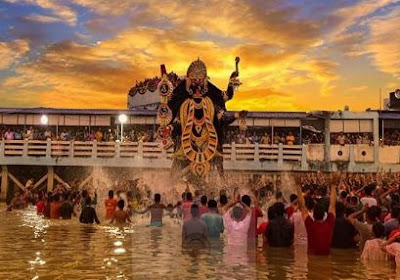
Boro Maa during visharjan in the Ganga on the fifth day of Kali Puja

Every year for visharjan, the idol of Boro Maa is carried on a trolley by hundreds of her ardent followers to the nearby Ganges river, for the immersion. The jewellery is carefully taken off the idol and kept in a safe for adorning the idol next year. During visharjan, the idol is adorned in her "raj besh" with enormous garlands costing lakhs of rupees, which have been specially designed and prepared over many hours. The procession is attended by thousands of her followers and devotees. For those who stay far away and can't attend the "visharjan shobhayatra" but want to see it, the puja committee has made arrangements for live streaming of the visharjan on their official Facebook handle. The visharjan crowd is regulated by more than 1000 police officials led by the Barrackpore police commissioner every year, to avoid any stampedes. The other Kali pujas in Naihati are immersed only after the visharjan of Boro Maa is completed.

== The Temple complex ==
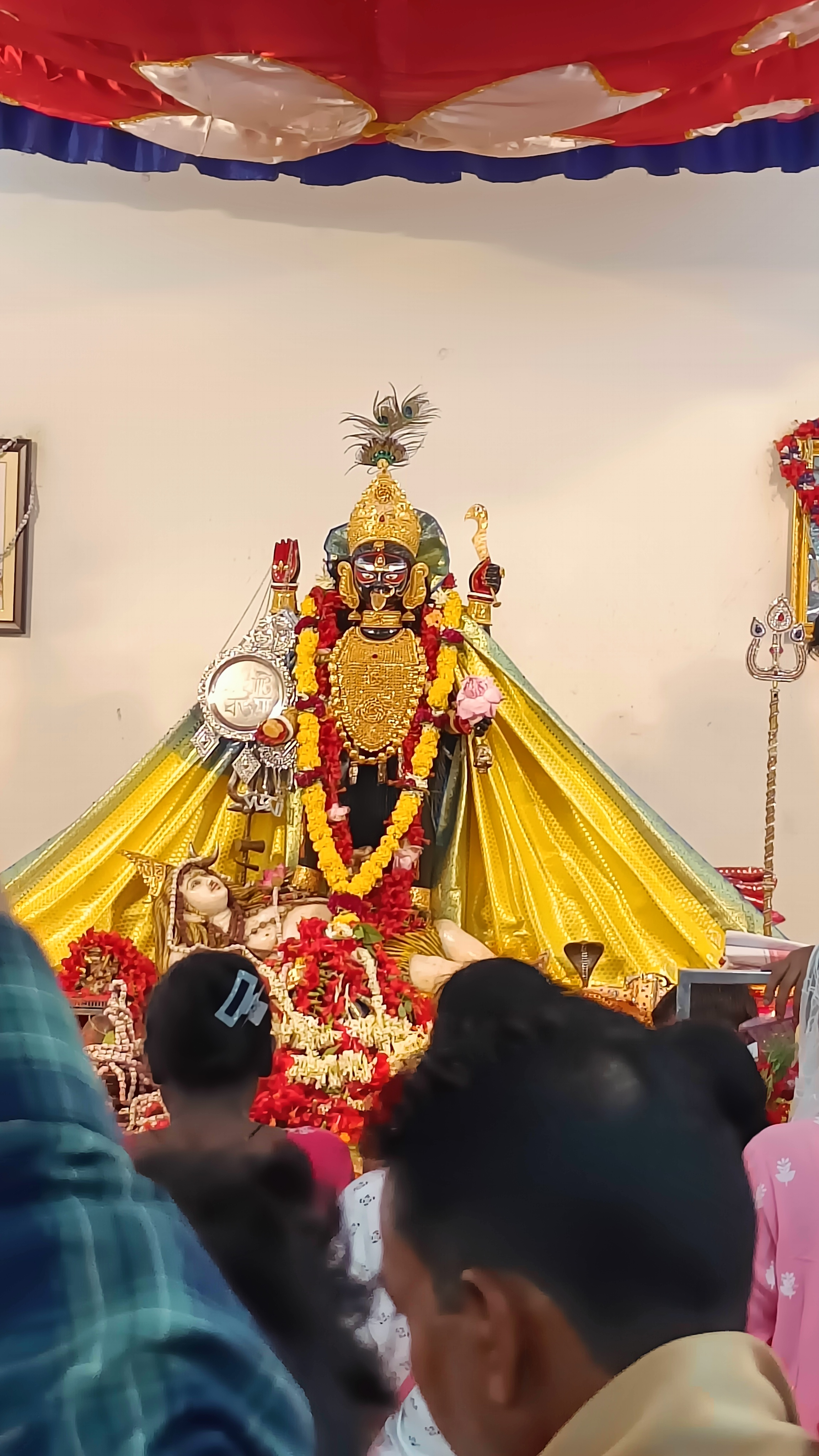
Boro Maa's vigraha in Temple

Before 2023, Boro Maa was worshipped throughout the year as a picture. The idol was made only during Kali puja and immersed by the end of it. In 2023, a new temple was created which was inaugurated by Abhishek Banerjee. Made from "Kasthi pathar", a permanent idol of Boro Maa was established inside the temple, as the principle deity. It was made by Rajasthan sculptor artist Dharmendra Sau at Rajendrapur, Naihati over a period of 3 months. A "chalchitro" made of 35 kg of silver was placed behind the deity. The new temple inauguration ceremony was marked by a giant yagna with 50 kg belkath by 12 priests, 3 of whom came from Varanasi. It was followed by Gitapath, Chandipath, Maha Mritunjaypath and Rudrapath. On that day, Boro Maa was adorned with 100 kg of silver and gold jewellery. The "pran pratishtha" and "chakkhudan" of the new idol was done few days later, on the day of Lakshmi Puja. Made on a budget of ₹8 crore, a guest house for the devotees, a larger "bhog mandir" and an old age home for 400 people was also inaugurated along with the new temple.

Besides the main temple, there are a number of other temples dedicated to different deities, inside the temple complex. Outside the inner complex is the Trinath temple. Dedicated to Lord Shiva, he is present there in a rare three-headed avatar. There is small idol of goddess Shitala at one corner of the temple complex, beside which the meals are being cooked. Opposite to this, a narrow passage leads to a tranquil Radha Krishna temple. While apples and bananas are given as offerings, two parallel rows of bananas are kept in front of the idols to resemble a swing.

== Prasad ==
Special poojas are performed on each of the 12 amavasyas every year. Among them, "Kali Puja" and "Baisakhi Amavasya" draws large crowds of lakhs of devotees. After the puja ceremonies, huge quantities of prasad is being prepared and distributed among the devotees. Almost, four-and-a-half kg of the bhog is prepared every amavasya. It includes pulao, five types of vegetable fries, five types of curries and five types of sweets. Over many years, the prasad of Kali puja is being prepared by Chandrakanta Mishra.

On the occasion of 100 years of the puja, "annakut" prasad was prepared for the first time and offered to the deity. Prasad was distributed among the people for 100 hours and 100 saplings were planted to mark the celebration. It included 3000 kg pulao, aloor dum, payesh and other items. Many a times, the devotees donate huge amounts of fruits for the puja rituals. The managing committee takes those fruits of prasad and distributes them to hospitals and old age homes, praying for their speedy recovery, good health and long live, with Boro Maa's aashirbad.

== Online puja facilities ==
To avoid excessive crowding in the temple and also to help those individuals who want to worship at the temple but can't visit as they live far away or due to some other difficulties, the temple committee launched an app titled "Joy Boro Maa" through which devotees will be able to offer pujas online. Besides, the organisers have also provided a number, by which devotees can register their name for the puja and also send their dakshinas online. During Kali puja, every year the organisers put up a LED screen outside the temple, so that the devotees standing in queue will be able to witness the puja until they reach to the deity.
