= Bhagadatta =

Character in the Mahabharata

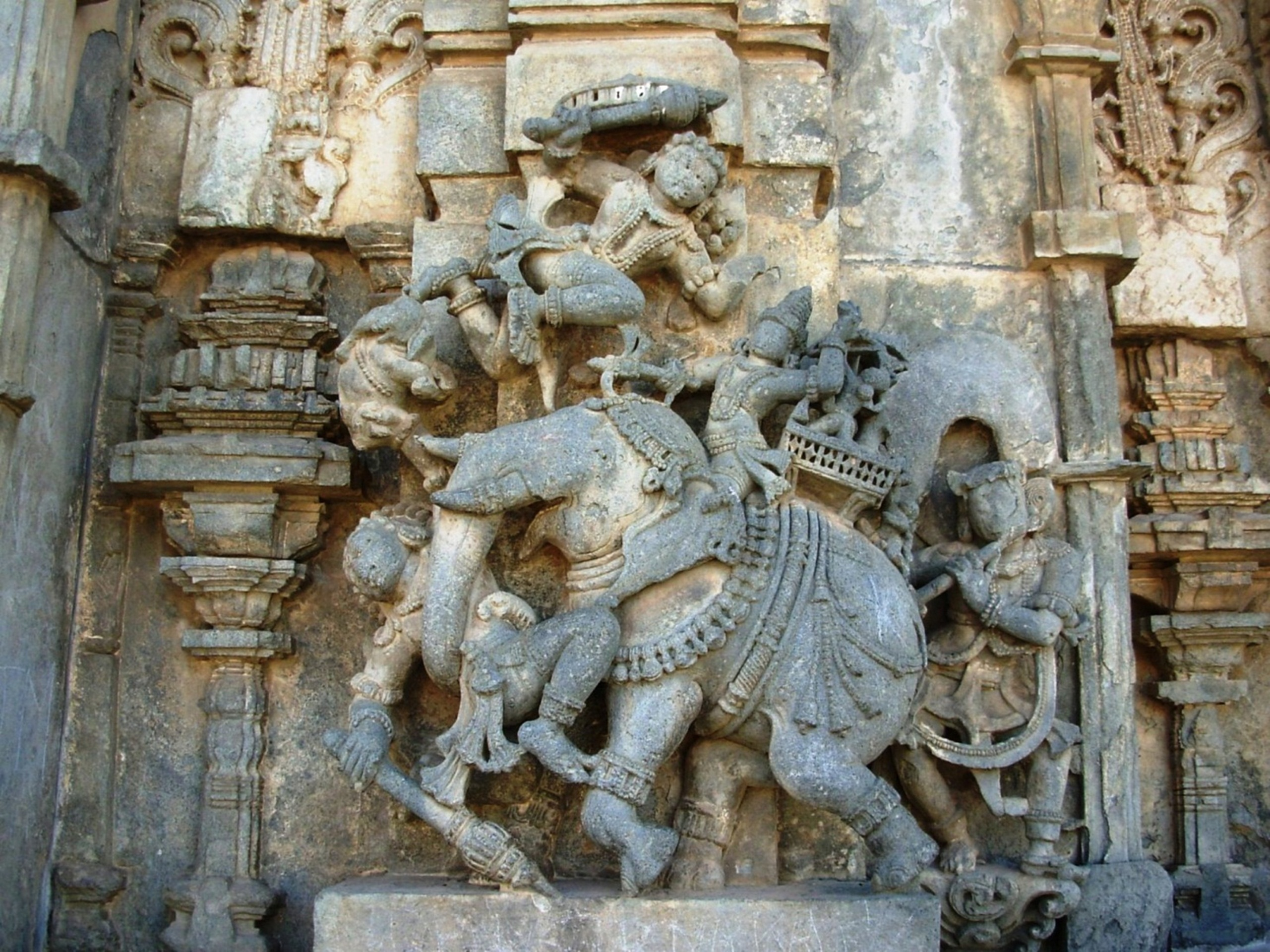
- A sculpture of Bhagadatta, seated on Supratika and fighting with Bhima, at the Chennakesava Temple, Belur.

Information
- Family: Narakasura (Father)
- Children: Vajradatta and Pushpadatta (sons)

Bhagadatta (Sanskrit: भगदत्त) is a character in the ancient Indian epic, the Mahabharata. was the son of Naraka, the king of Pragjyotisha in Hindu History. Bhagadatta was born from a limb of the asura called Bashkala. He was a renowned warrior, and was known to be a great friend of Indra. When Arjuna embarked on a conquest to help his brother Yudhishthira perform the rajasuya yajna, Bhagadatta was one of the first kings to be conquered by him.

The Mahabharata also links Bhagadatta with the Yavanas. One passage of the Sabha Parva describes him as the mighty ruler of the mlecchas who came with the Yavanas (yavanaiḥ sahitaḥ), while another, in K. M. Ganguli's translation, refers to him as "that king of the Yavanas ... who is called Bhagadatta". The word Yavana is generally understood to derive from Ionian and in early Indian usage commonly denoted Greeks.

He was particularly skilled in the use of elephants in warfare. Riding on his elephant Supratika, he fought for the Kauravas in the Kurukshetra War. He was succeeded by his son Vajradatta. He was the leader of the army of Kiratas and Chinas in the war.

== Legend ==
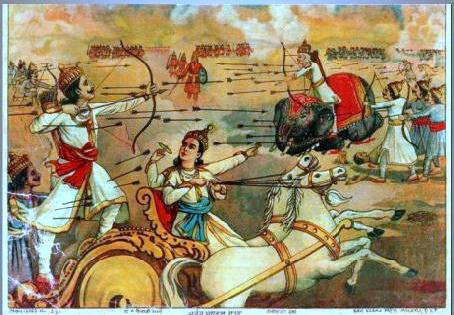
Arjuna shoots Bhagadatta.

Bhagadatta was the son of Narakasura, the friend of Indra, and an ally of Jarasandha. He inherited the Vaishnavastra from Naraka, which protected him from being slain on the battlefield. He was also skilled at fighting from elephants. According to Krishna, Bhagadatta vanquished many Asuras and conquered the western region. In the Kurukshetra War, Bhagadatta fought on the side of the Kauravas. His father was Narakasura, who had been slain by Krishna. Despite having a grudge against Krishna, Bhagadatta was very fond of Arjuna due to Arjuna being son of Indra. Before Rajasuya Yaga, when Arjuna was unable to prevail over Bhagadatta even after fighting for 8 days, the latter understood the situation and accepted the defeat. Bhagadatta battled with Karna, when Karna was performing the world conquest for Duryodhana's Vaishnav Yagna. Despite being a mighty warrior, Bhagadatta got defeated by Karna and was forced to pay tribute to Duryodhana. During Yudhishthira's ashvamedha yajna, Arjuna fought against Vajradatta, Bhagadatta's son.

During the war, he contributed one akshauhini of the troops. At this point he was so old that he tied his wrinkled eyelids with a silken handkerchief to cover his eyes in battle.

During the first day of the battle, Bhagadatta had a duel with the king of Virata. On the fourth day of the Kurukshetra War, Bhima was raided by Bhagadatta's division. Bhagadatta caused Bhima to faint in the field. The rakshasa Ghatotkacha, who was the son of Bhima, became enraged and disappeared from the scene there and then. He reappeared in an instant, creating a terrifying illusion of a fierce form riding on thefour trunks of Airavata created by the powers of his maya. He created the other heavenly elephants, such as Anjana, Vamana, and Mahapadma, following him on a wild procession ridden by demons. Ghatotkacha then urged to fight with his own elephant, who wanted to kill Bhagadatta and his elephant. And those other elephants, excited by anger and each with four teeth, urged on by demons of great power, fell on Bhagadatta's elephant from all sides and afflicted him with their teeth. And Bhagadatta's elephant, thus in pain, cried loudly like Indra's thunder. And hearing those terrible and loud cries of that roaring elephant, Bhishma, the commander of the Kauravas, asked all the kings to retreat for the day. He was defeated in his fight with Ghatotkacha.

On the seventh day, there was another confrontation between them. Ghatotkacha attacked Bhagadatta and rained arrows and arrows on him. Heavy weapons were thrown at each other and in the end the king struck Ghatotkacha in all his four limbs. He stood for a while and then exerted all his might and threw a magical golden shaft towards the elephant Supratika. Bhagadatta quickly broke the shaft into three parts. Ghatotkacha fled the encounter that day and retreated to fight again another day. After this there was a war with King Dasharna in which the king was defeated. Shortly thereafter Bhagadatta cut off the hands of Kshatredeva. Bhima's army charioteer Vishoka fell down after being hit by Bhagadatta's arrows and fell unconscious.

On the twelfth day of the Kurukshetra war, Duryodhana sent a large army of elephants against Bhima. Bhima killed all the elephants with his mace. The news spread rapidly and reached Bhagadatta. Bhagadatta charged his elephant against Bhima and crushed his chariot and killed his horse and charioteer under Supratika's feet. Bhima escaped by jumping from his chariot and fell down between the legs of the elephant. Due to pain, he injured the elephant's limbs by cutting it. An enraged Supratika grabbed Bhima by the trunk of her neck but Bhima managed to escape from her grip and came under the elephant again. He also tried to hurt the elephant further, but was waiting for another elephant to come to his rescue. The Kaurava army thought that Bhima had been killed by the animal, and began to celebrate. Bhima's elder brother Yudhishthira felt grieved and asked the king of Dasarana to accuse Bhagadatta with his division of elephants. In a fight between Supratika and Dasara's elephant, Supratika crushed and killed Dasara's elephants. In this scuffle, Bhima escaped safely.

Bhagadatta killed King Dasharna and Ruciparvan.

Several warriors like Abhimanyu, Satyaki, Bhima Ghatotkacha tried to stop Bhagadatta, but got defeated by Bhagadatta. Bhagadatta headed towards Yudhishthira's position. Bhagadatta with his elephant started crushing the army of Pandavas like a wild elephant. Krishna drove Arjuna to face Bhagadatta and Supratika. The battle ensued with Arjuna on his chariot and Bhagadatta on his elephant, both wearing armour. Bhagadatta tried to kill Arjuna with his elephant, but failed. However he was successful in displacing Arjuna's celestial diadem. Arjuna cut off Bhagadatta's bow and all the spears he had thrown. Arjuna was successful in destroying the flag hoisting on the elephant seat. Bhagadatta grew furious, employing the weapon Vaishnavastra to kill Arjuna however Krishna saves Arjuna by taking the astra on him. Arjuna later killed Bhagadatta.

Arjuna got down from his chariot and went around the fallen Bhagadatta in the practice of pradakshina to pay his last respects to his father's friend.

After his death, his son Vajradatta became the king of Pragjyotisha. Later, he was also killed by the Arjuna in a battle. His another son Pushpadatta was killed by Nakula as per Drona Parva. King Shailaya, who was Bhagadatta's grandfather, attained Indraloka because of the greatness of his penance.

In Kalika Purana, Harshacharita, Puranas and in other epics, Naraka is said to have sons namely Bhagadatta, Mahasirsa, Madavan, and Sumali. Vajradatta and Pushpadatta are the sons of Bhagadatta.

== See also ==
- Kamarupa kingdom
- Historicity of the Mahabharata
