= Naihati =

- City
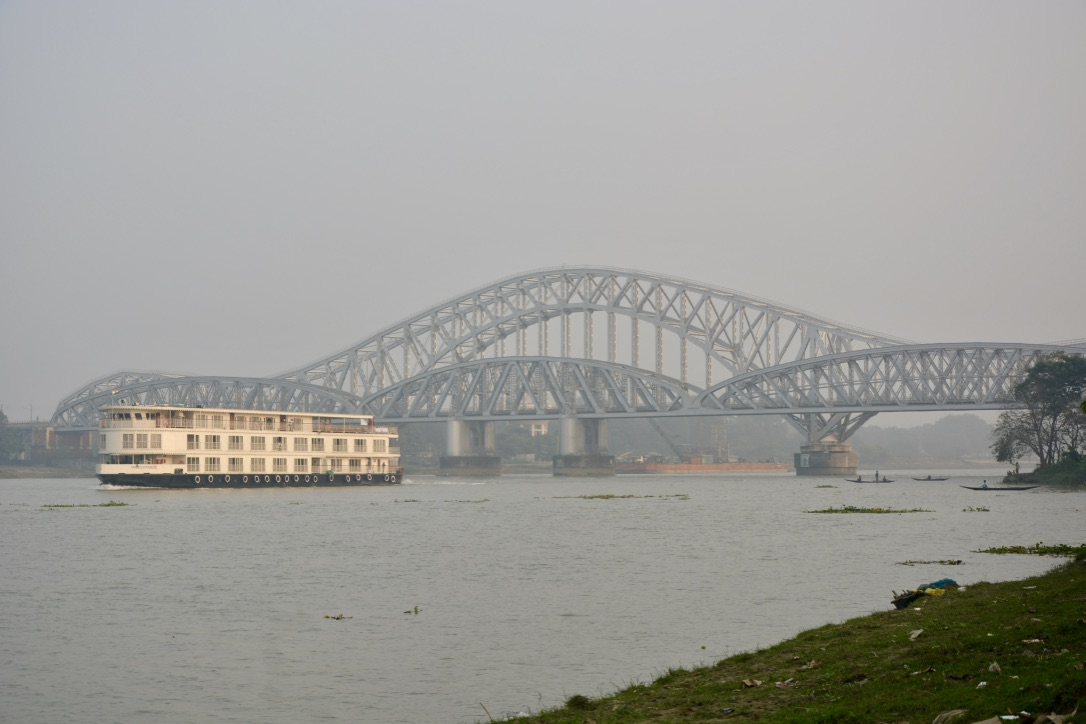
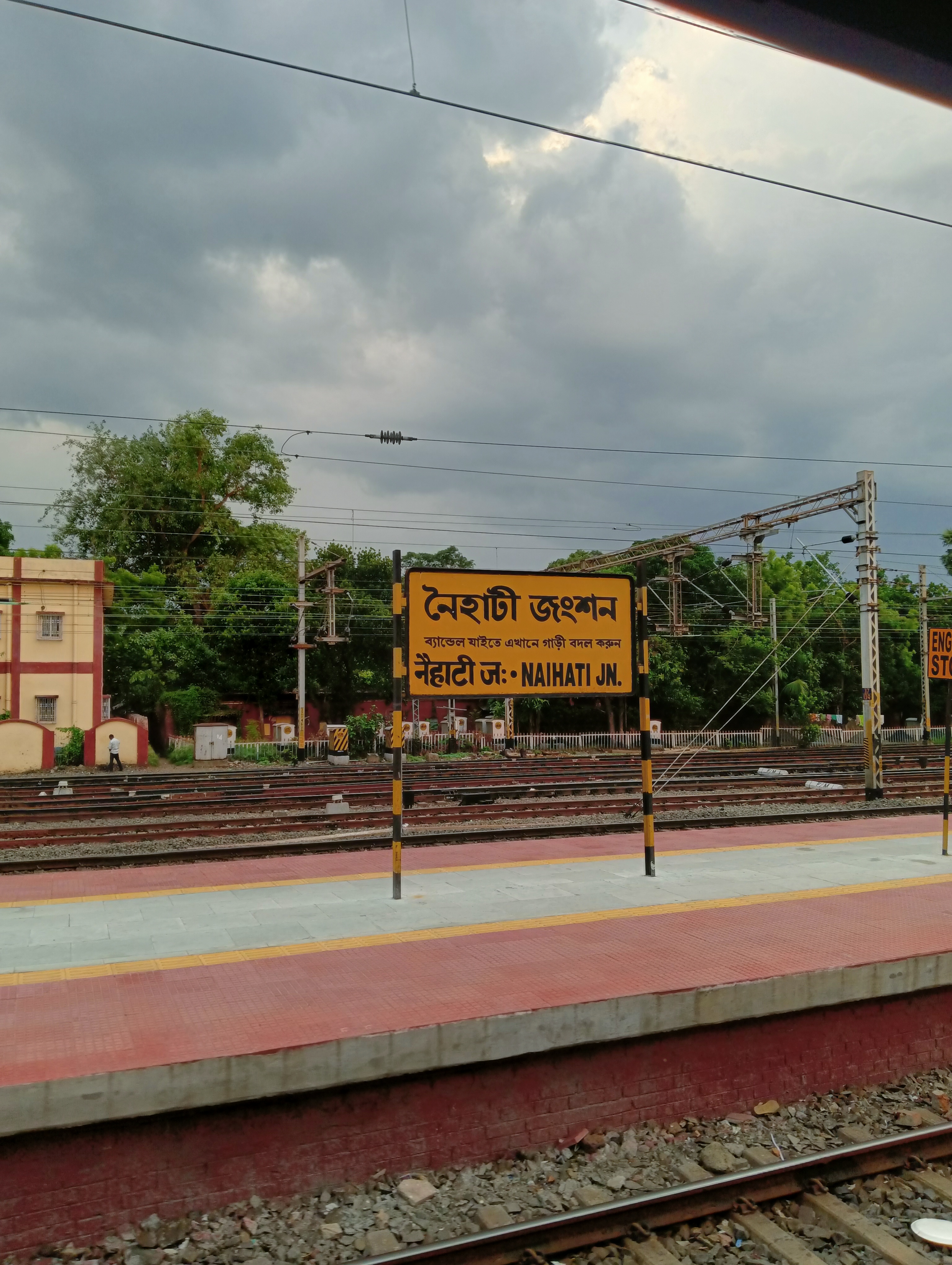
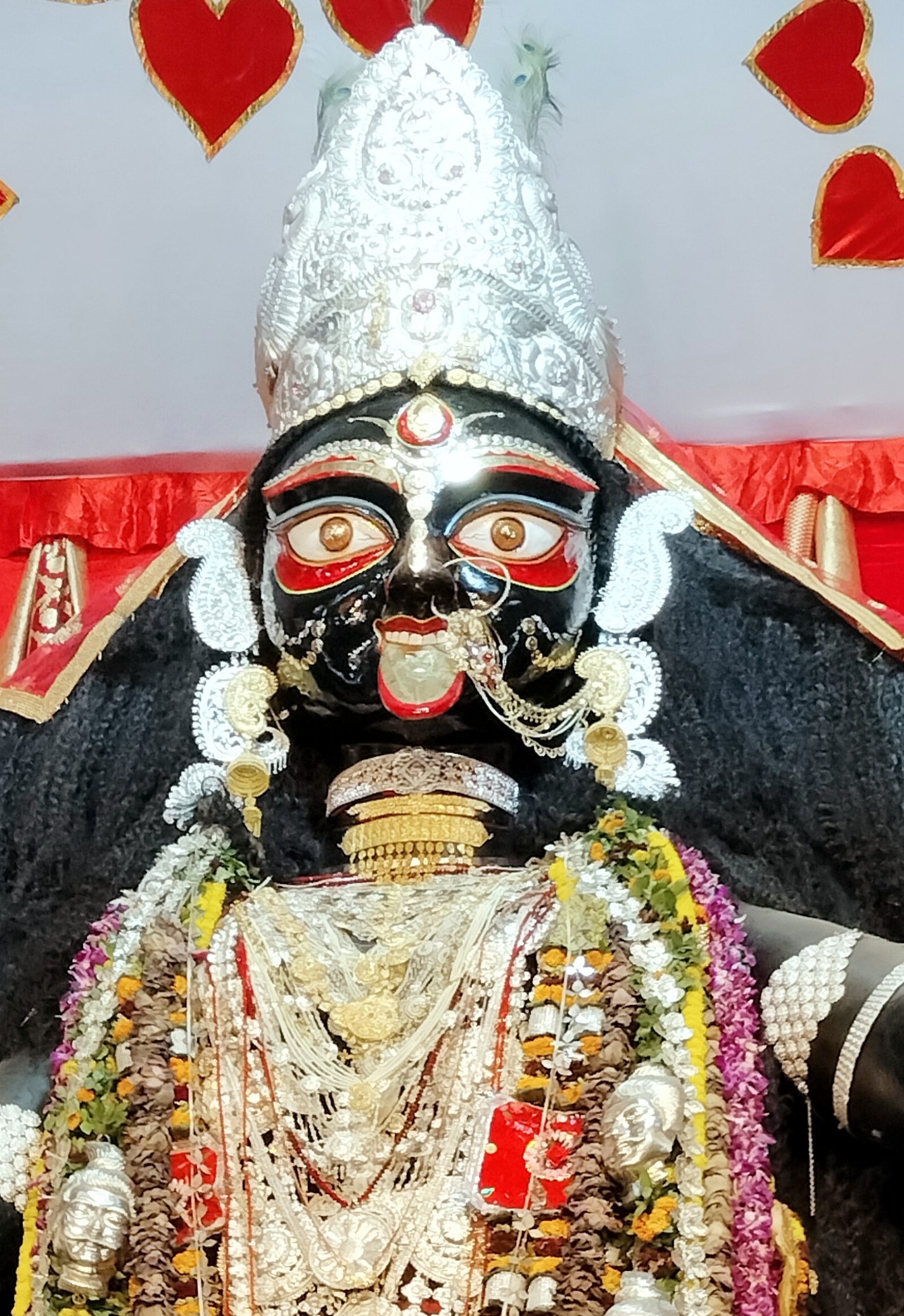
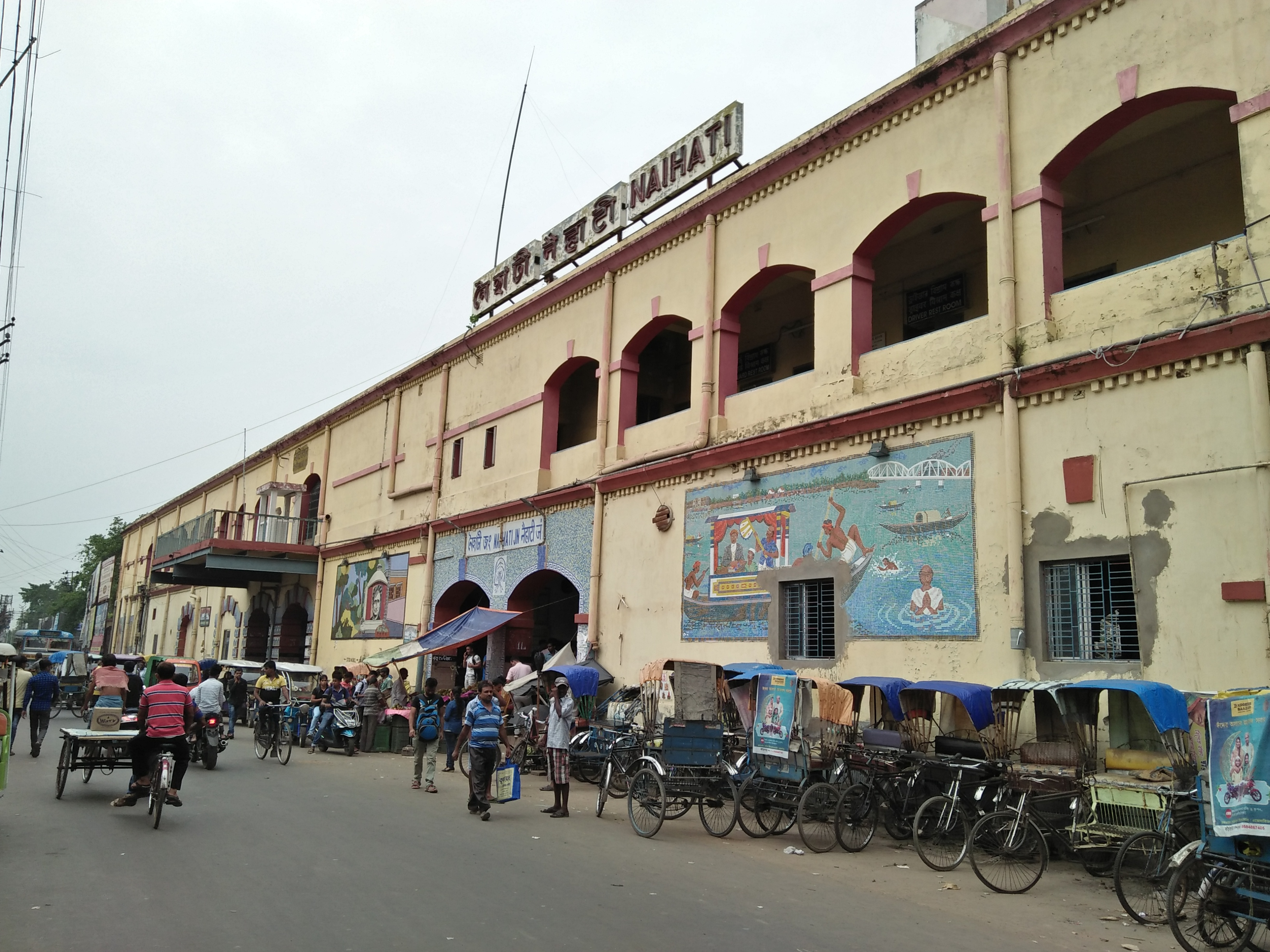
- Clockwise from top: Sampreeti Bridge and Jubilee Bridge; Boro Maa, Naihati; Naihati Junction railway station Naihati Station Board

- Location in West Bengal, India Naihati (India)
- Coordinates: 22.89°N 88.42°E
- Country: India
- State: West Bengal
- Division: Presidency
- District: North 24 Parganas

Government
  - Type: Municipality
  - Body: Naihati Municipality
  - Chairman: Ashok Kumar Chatterjee

Area
  - Total: 11.55 km^{2} (4.46 sq mi)
- Elevation: 15 m (49 ft)

Population (2011)
  - Total: 217,900
  - Density: 18,870/km^{2} (48,860/sq mi)

Languages
  - Official: Bengali, English, Hindi
- Time zone: UTC+5:30 (IST)
- PIN: 743165
- Telephone code: +91 33
- Vehicle registration: WB
- Lok Sabha constituency: Barrackpore
- Vidhan Sabha constituency: Naihati
- Website: north24parganas.nic.in

Naihati is a city and a municipality of North 24 Parganas district in the Indian state of West Bengal. It is a part of the area covered by Kolkata Metropolitan Development Authority (KMDA).

Naihati Municipality is one of the oldest municipalities in North 24 Parganas district and was established in 1869. It is the birthplace of Bankim Chandra Chattopadhyay, the author of India's national song Vande Mataram, among other luminaries.

== Geography ==
Cities and towns in the northern portion of Barrackpore subdivision in North 24 Parganas district
M: municipal city/ town, CT: census town,
N: neighbourhood, OG: outgrowth
Owing to space constraints in the small map, the actual locations in a larger map may vary slightly

=== Location ===
Naihati is located at 22.9°N 88.42°E. It has an average elevation of 15 metres (49 feet).

Naihati is bounded by Garifa, Halisahar and Balibhara on the north, Ramghat, Indira Nagar, Saheb Colony, Rajendrapur, Mamudpur and Dogachhia on the east, Bhatpara and Madral on the south, and the Hooghly on the west. Although not specifically spelled out, it is evident that localities such as Garifa, Kultala, Bibeksarani, Bijaynagar, Nimbagan and Fingapara are neighbourhoods in Naihati, though some consider them to a part of Naihati.

96.02% of the population of Barrackpore subdivision (partly presented in the map alongside) live in urban areas. In 2011, it had a density of population of 10,967 per km^{2} The subdivision has 16 municipalities and 24 census towns.

For most of the cities/ towns information regarding density of population is available in the Infobox. Population data is not available for neighbourhoods. It is available for the entire municipal area and thereafter ward-wise.

All places marked on the map are linked in the full-screen map.

=== Police station ===
Naihati police station under Barrackpore Police Commissionerate has jurisdiction over Naihati Municipal area and Barrackpore I CD Block, including Barrackpur Cantonment Board.

=== Post Office ===
Naihati has a delivery sub post office, with PIN 743165 in the North Presidency Division of North 24 Parganas district in Calcutta region. Other post offices with the same PIN are Naihati Anandabazar and Puranandapally. Some regions of Garifa post office (743166) also is inside Naihati.

=== Climate ===
Being situated in the tropics, the climate of Naihati comprises primarily of hot and humid summers, and cool and dry winters. The rain-bearing clouds from the Bay of Bengal bring torrential rain in the monsoon. In the summer, the temperature may reach as high as 45°C and in the winter, it may drop to 5°C.

== Demographics ==
=== Population ===
Historical population
Year	Pop.	±%
1901	23,753	—
1911	18,219	−23.3%
1921	23,286	+27.8%
1931	30,908	+32.7%
1941	42,200	+36.5%
1951	55,313	+31.1%
1961	76,254	+37.9%
1971	108,525	+42.3%
1981	147,753	+36.1%
1991	172,647	+16.8%
2001	215,303	+24.7%
2011	217,900	+1.2%
Source: Census of India

As per the 2011 Census of India, Naihati had a total population of 217,900, of which 109,849 (50%) were males and 108,051 (50%) were females. Population below 6 years was 19,761. The total number of literates in Naihati was 173,397 (87.51% of the population over 6 years).

As of 2001 India census, Naihati had a population of 215,432. Males constitute 53% of the population and females 47%. Naihati has an average literacy rate of 74%, higher than the national average of 59.5%: male literacy is 79%, and female literacy is 70%. In Naihati, 9% of the population is under 6 years of age.

=== Languages ===
Languages spoken in Naihati city (2011)
1. Bengali (70.6%)
2. Hindi (24.3%)
3. Urdu (3.60%)
4. Odia (0.34%)
5. Telugu (0.17%)
6. Others (0.16%)

=== Migrants ===
According to a study carried out by Vidyasagar University, "Most of these industrial units were located in riverine towns. A few of these were old towns inhabited previously by middle class Bengali 'babus' while others were new towns grown out of agricultural lands... Agriculture in Bengal was more remunerative than work in the jute mills but what the jute mills paid was enough to attract labour from Bihar, Orissa, U.P. first and then from C.P. or even Madras...The industrial 'mohallas' remained as 'ghettos'. There was little or no interconnection or social and cultural contact between local Bengali population and the mill hands. Both lived in their own worlds."

=== Kolkata Urban Agglomeration ===
The following Municipalities, Census Towns and other locations in Barrackpore subdivision were part of Kolkata Urban Agglomeration in the 2011 census: Kanchrapara (M), Jetia (CT), Halisahar (M), Balibhara (CT), Naihati (M), Bhatpara (M), Kaugachhi (CT), Garshyamnagar (CT), Garulia (M), Ichhapur Defence Estate (CT), North Barrackpur (M), Barrackpur Cantonment (CB), Barrackpore (M), Jafarpur (CT), Ruiya (CT), Titagarh (M), Khardaha (M), Bandipur (CT), Panihati (M), Muragachha (CT) New Barrackpore (M), Chandpur (CT), Talbandha (CT), Patulia (CT), Kamarhati (M), Baranagar (M), South Dumdum (M), North Dumdum (M), Dum Dum (M), Noapara (CT), Babanpur (CT), Teghari (CT), Nanna (OG), Chakla (OG), Srotribati (OG) and Panpur (OG).

== Infrastructure ==
As per the District Census Handbook 2011, Naihati Municipal city covered an area of 11.55 km^{2}. Amongst the civic amenities it had 237.81 km of roads and open drains. Amongst the social, recreational and cultural facilities it had 1 stadium, 2 cinema/theatres and 5 public libraries. Amongst the commodities manufactured was bori. It had 8 bank branches.

According to the Barrackpore administration, amongst the educational facilities at Naihati are 3 colleges and 10 high schools. Amongst the other facilities are 9 markets, 1 post office, 4 sub post offices, 2 ferry ghats, one municipal park, municipal lodges, 3 cinema halls (Naihati cinema hall-closed and under litigation, Kalyani cinema hall and newly opens RK Multiplex), 3 public halls (Oikatan auditorium, Railway hall and Railway Banquet Hall), 14 play grounds and 1 burning ghat (Ramghat: electric and conventional burning ghat).

== Economy ==
=== Industry ===
Naihati has a vibrant industrial area. "Once upon a time, mill sirens would keep the time in Naihati. Sirens at six o'clock, at nine o'clock, at eleven o'clock… Pulse of the factories would impart a collective sense of time, a sense of discipline, a united communal life. Even before the break of dawn tea shops in factory premises and even in far off places, would open shutters. Lines of pedestrians and cyclists would be seen going to work. Night shift workers would come out in hordes to make way for the morning shift." Most of the factories in Naihati-Garifa area have closed down. Workers and employees are in an unbearable state, and the socio-cultural environment of a much larger area has been vitiated. A brief about the past industries follows.

- Jenson & Nicholson was established in India in 1922 by its parent company Berger-Jenson & Nicholson, UK. The first factory of Jenson & Nicholson at Naihati went into production in 1925. The company produces paints, pigments, varnishes and allied products. The foreign holdings in the company were bought over by S.P.Sinha in 1964. The Naihati paint factory was modernised in the late 1980s. Bijay Chandra Srivastava has been managing director from 2014.
- Gouripore Jute Mill at Naihati was once upon a time considered by many as the best jute mill in the World. The fairy-tale jute mill environment of the colonial era has been succinctly described by Soumitra Das in The Telegraph, "The mill had its own train and its engine was a museum piece. It carried coal to the power house. The Gouripur mill had its own water filter plant and captive electricity and water supply system...The mill opened in 1862...Gouripore Jute Mills originally belonged to the Inchcape Group under Barry & Co. Later, in 1948, following amalgamation in 1948, MacNeill & Barry owned three jute mills — Gouripore, Nuddea and Ganges Manufacturing at Bansberia. Naihati bustled with activity owing to the presence of Jenson Nicholson, Gouripur Electric Supply and Containers and Closures alongside what was the largest and best jute mill of those times." The Scottish owners left, Gouripore Jute Mill changed hands and was closed in 1998.
- Nuddea Jute Mills at Naihati became a part of the MacNeill & Barry group in 1948. It has been going through a lot of turmoil from the 1980s and was also referred to BIFR. The mill seems to be out of operation, but the picture is hazy.

For Naihati Jute Mill at Hazinagar see Halisahar

Amongst the other closed factories are Gouripore Thermal Power Station, Containers and Closures Limited and Indian Paper Pulp (IPP or more popular as kagaj kal). Recently an industrial hub has come up beside the Kalyani highway as Rishi Bankim industrial hub where new small scale industries are coming up very fast.

=== Fish culture ===
Naihati, Jora Battala[Rajendrapur] area is also notable for fish farming, rearing of sweet water fish seeds of various genus like Rohu, Katla, Koi, Magur, Pabda, Silver Carp, Common Carp and many more. It was started under a training programme by Central Inland Fisheries Research Institute (CIFRI), now known as Central Institute of Freshwater Aquaculture (CIFA), located at Kalyani. It is an initiative of the Indian Government, handled by Indian Council of Agricultural Research (ICAR).

This initiative by the then Indian government, and numerous renowned scientists and under their supervision, it was possible to bring a control over the production and preservation of various breeds of sweet water fishes.

The season starts from end of April and continues till the monsoon lasts.

=== KMDA ===
Naihati Municipality is included in the Kolkata Metropolitan Area for which the KMDA is the statutory planning and development authority.

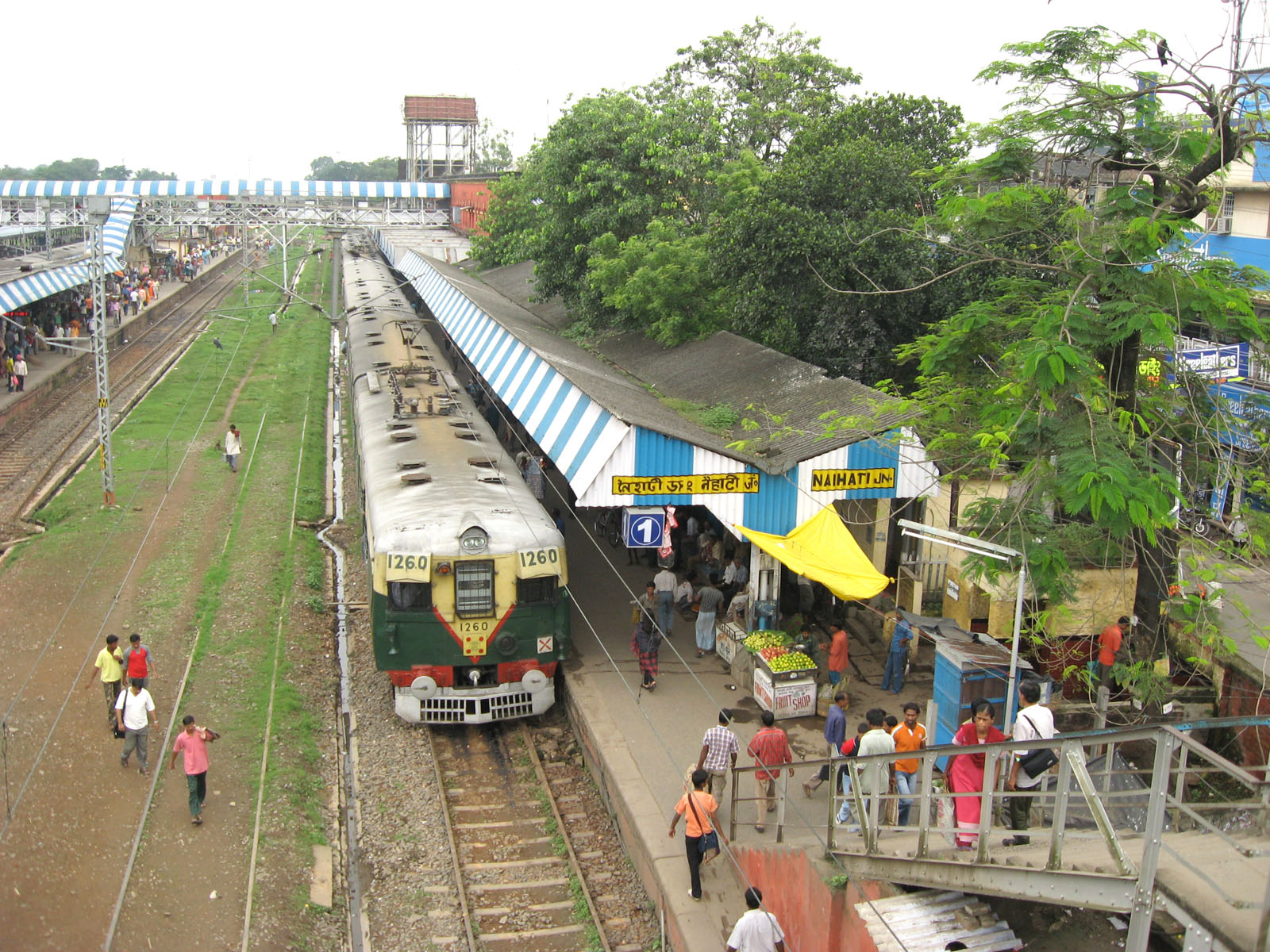
Naihati railway station

== Transport ==
=== Railway service ===
Naihati Junction railway station is 38 km from Sealdah on the Sealdah - Naihati Jn Line and 16 km from Barrackpore. It is part of the Kolkata Suburban Railway system. It is connected to Bandel Junction on the Howrah-Bardhaman main line. The journey takes about 20 minutes. Garifa railway station is nearby also.

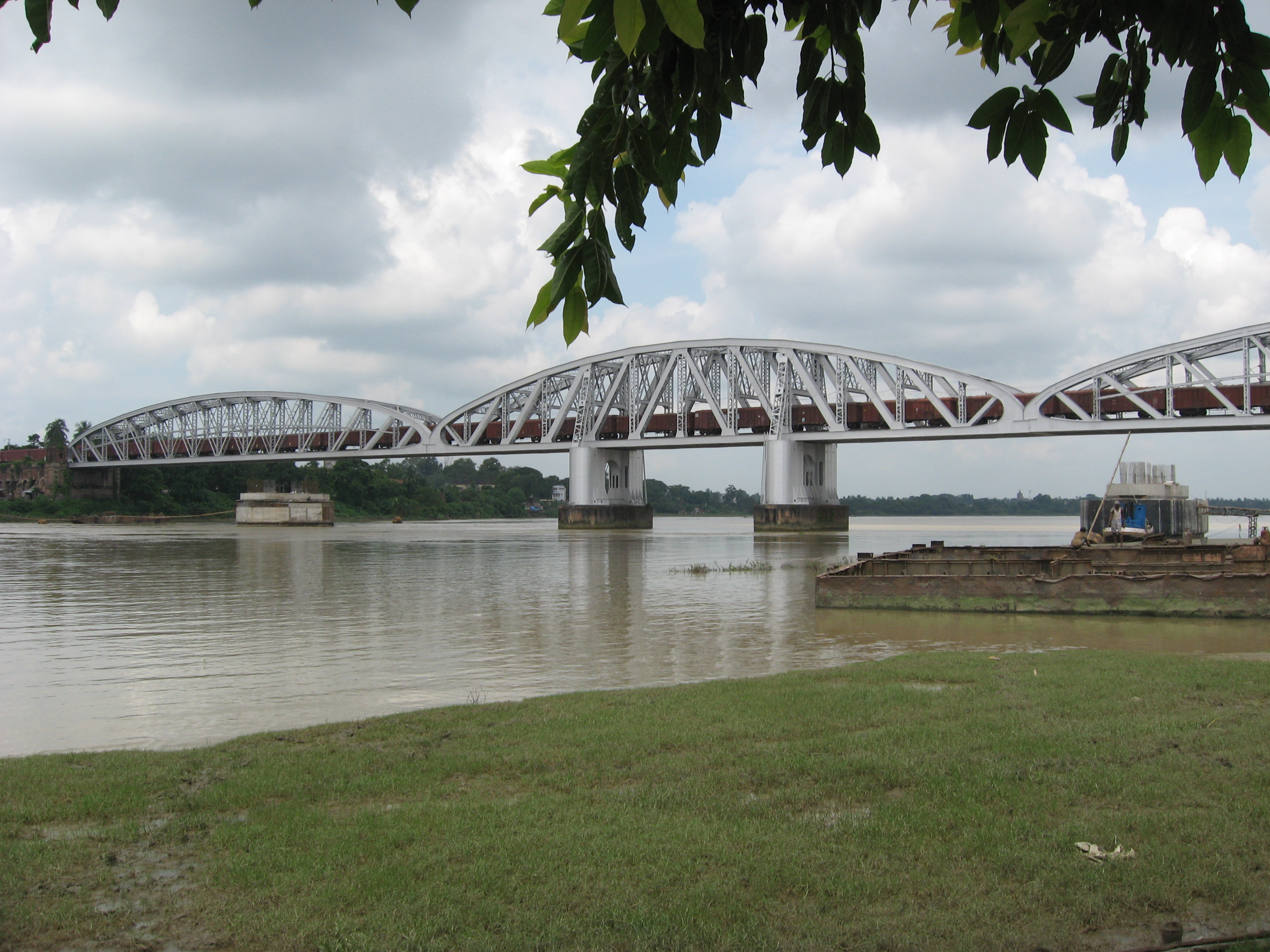
Jubilee Bridge

In 1857, the Eastern Bengal Railway (EBR) was formed to lay the tracks along the east bank of the Hooghly River to Kushtia and then extended to Goalundo Ghat. The Jubilee Bridge linking Bandel and Naihati was opened on 21 February 1887, so that up country freight traffic could run up to Kolkata Port. Finally, Sampreeti Bridge replaced Jubilee Bridge in 2017.

=== Commuters ===
About 32 lakh people from all around Naihati commute to Kolkata daily for work. In the Sealdah-Krishnanagar section there are 34 trains that carry commuters from 30 railway stations. In the Sealdah-Shantipur section 32 trains carry commuters from 29 stations.

=== Ferry service ===
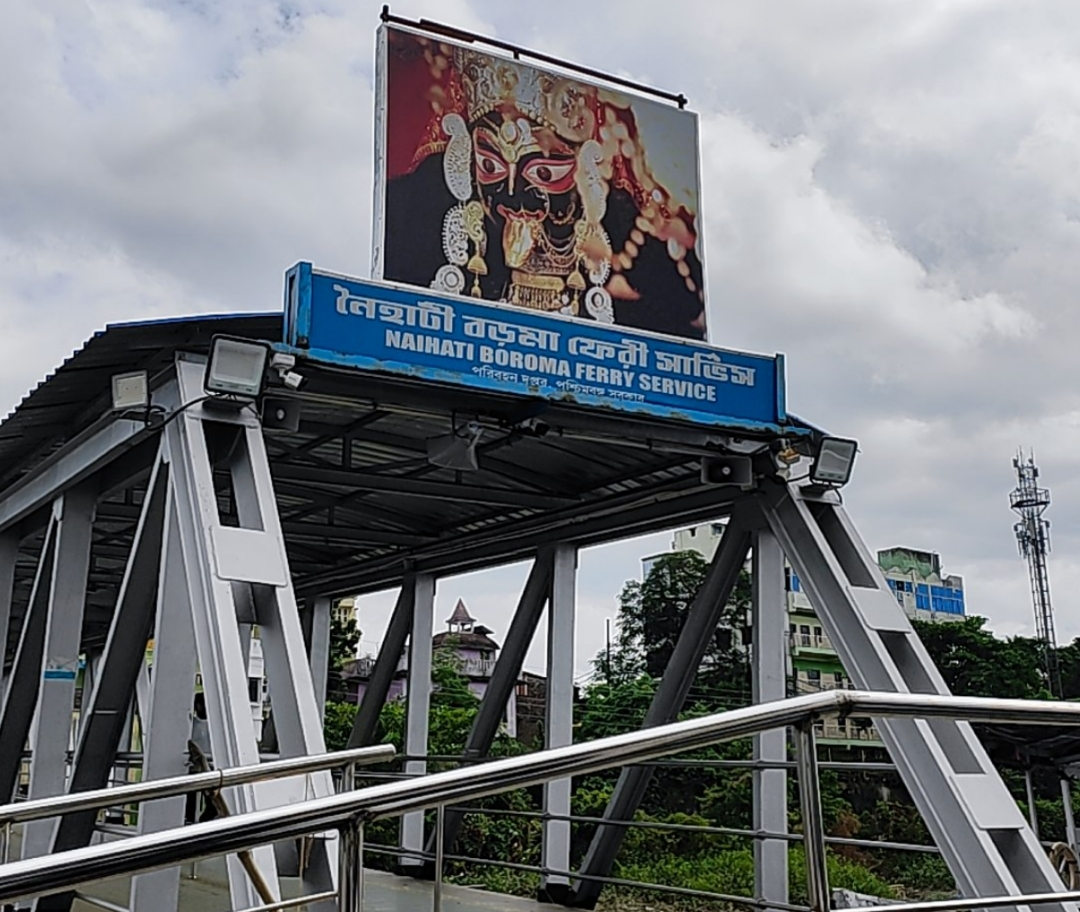
Naihati Boro Maa Ferry Ghat

Naihati Ferry Service Jetty Ghat links to Mechuabazar Ferry Service Jetty Ghat across the Hooghly at Chinsurah and the Hooghly Garifa Boat Service links Ram Ghat to Hooghly Ghat at Hooghly.

=== Public bus service ===
While State Highway 1 passes through the heart of the city, Kalyani Expressway touches the outskirts. The Naihati-Habra Road is an important local road.

The road transport is chiefly via the well known 85 no route (name of the bus route) which operates between Kanchrapara and Barrackpore. There are some other bus routes also like Naihati to Habra (73), Naihati to Barasat (87A and DN5), etc. A new state and also a private bus has started from Naihati to Digha, from Kanthalpara railway bridge and Saheb Colony More.

West Bengal Transport Corporation Bus (CTC)

- D2 Habra — Naihati [Frequent] via Ashoknagar, Chowrangee, Awalsiddhi, Saheb Colony, Mamudpur
- E59 Naihati - Digha

Private Buses

- 73 Habra - Naihati
- 85 Barrackpore Court – Kanchrapara
- 87A Barasat – Naihati
- DN5 Barasat - Naihati
- Egra – Naihati

== Education ==
- Rishi Bankim Chandra College was established at Naihati in 1947.
- Rishi Bankim Chandra College for Women was initially started as the morning section for women in Rishi Bankim Chandra College. The college was rechristened in 1984 as Rishi Bankim Chandra College for Women.
- Rishi Bankim Chandra Evening College was set up initially as the evening section of Rishi Bankim Chandra College and was rechristened as Rishi Bankim Chandra Evening College in 1984.

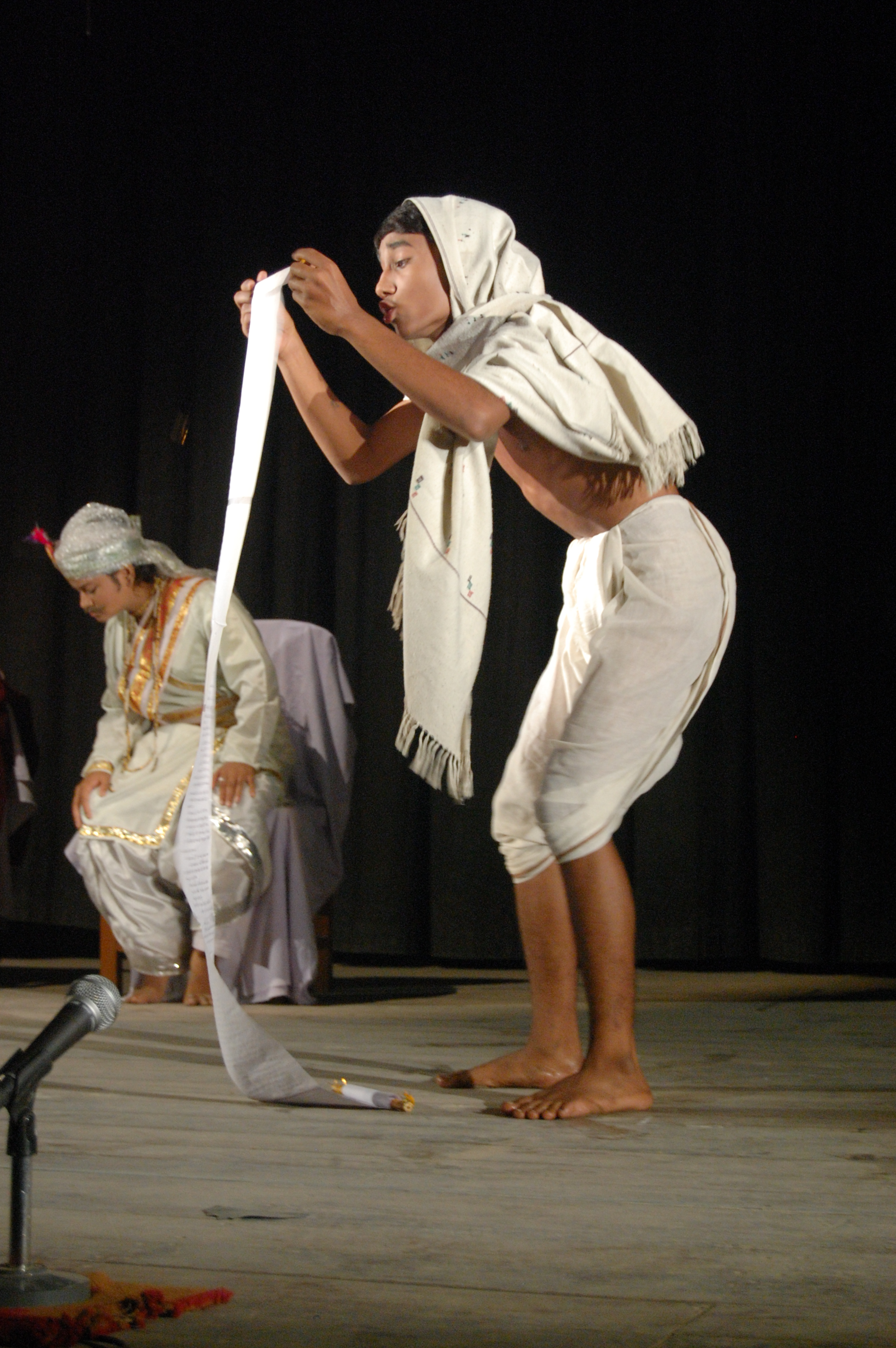
A dramatic moment from Totakahini.

== Kali Temple ==
There are several famous Kali Pujas and Pandals in Naihati. The most famous one is the Boro Maa Kali Temple which is around 101 years old. There are many more important Kali Temples and Pujas which are much older.

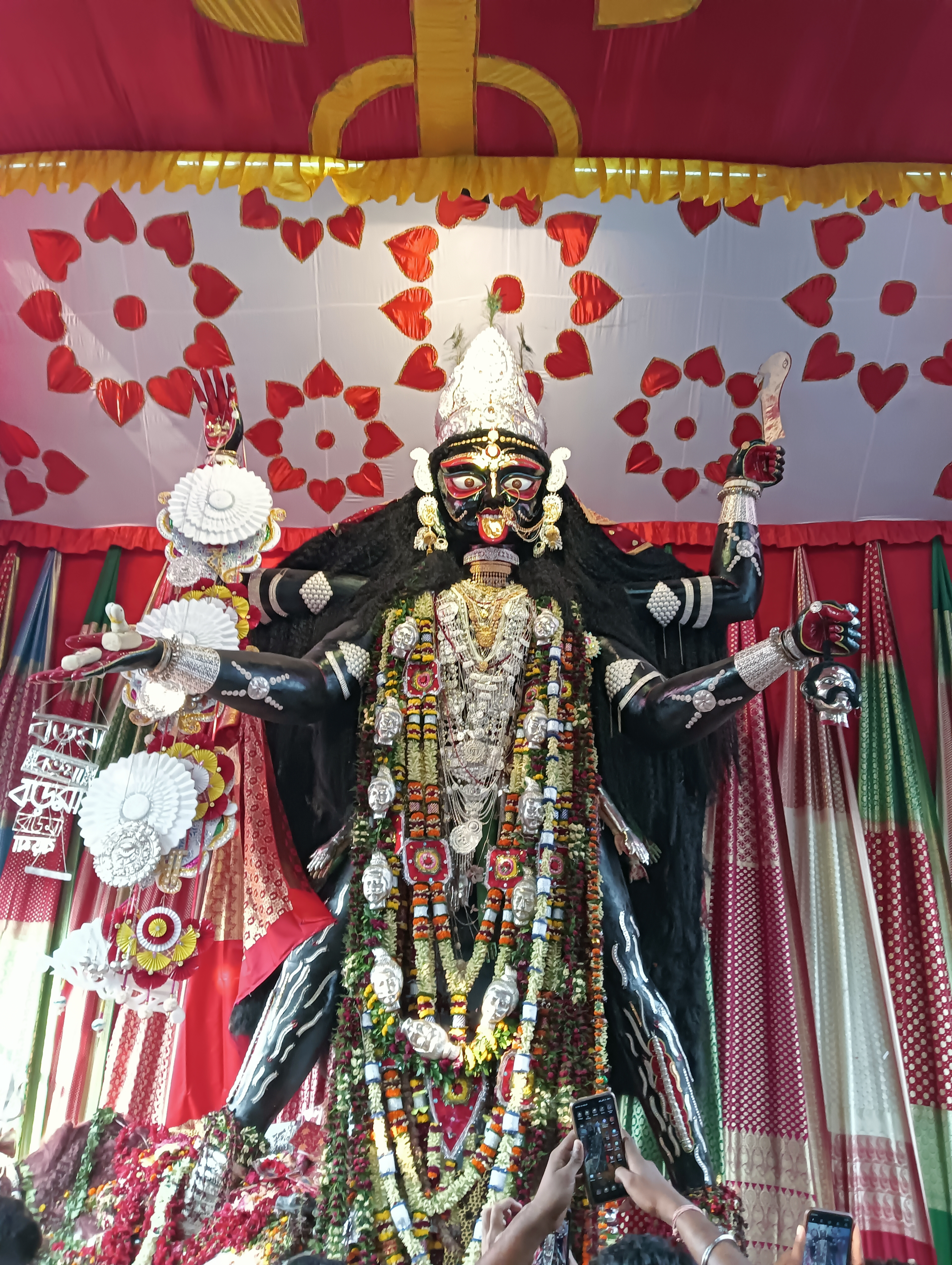
Idol of Boro Maa, Naihati

== Sports ==
The 25,000-capacity Naihati Bamkimanjali Stadium which is used mostly for association football, is the largest sports venue by capacity in Naihati. Opened in 2019, the stadium hosts games of Calcutta Football League, Naihati Gold Cup and I-League.

== Notable people ==
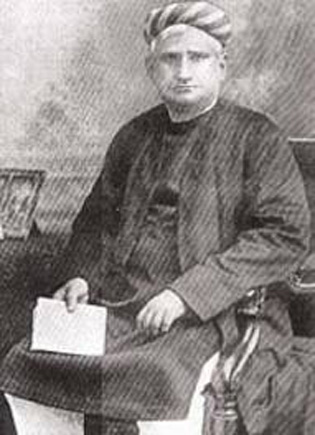
Bankim Chandra Chatterjee

- Bankim Chandra Chatterjee, novelist
- Chittaprosad Bhattacharya, artist
- Debashis Mukherjee, quantum chemist and the developer of multireference coupled cluster theory
- Haraprasad Shastri, historian and linguist
- Keshab Chandra Sen, social reformer
- Panchanan Ghoshal, criminologist, writer
- Pramathanath Mitra, barrister and founder of the Anushilan Samiti.
- Sanjib Chandra Chattopadhyay a Bengali writer, poet and journalist.
- Samaresh Bose, writer
- Krishna Kumari, Telugu and Kannada actress
- Shyamal Mitra, singer
- Vidyadhar Bhattacharya, chief architect and city planner of Jaipur, Rajasthan
- Raghab Chatterjee, singer
- Sutirtha Mukherjee, table tennis player
- Ayhika Mukherjee, table tennis player

== See also ==
- List of railway stations in India
- Bankim Chandra Chattopadhyay
- Bankim Bhavan Gaveshana Kendra
