= Harshavarman =

Mleccha Dynasty King of Kamarupa (725–750)

- Predecessor: Vajrastamba
- Successor: Balavarman II
- House: Mlechchha dynasty
- Father: Vajrastambha

Harshavarman was a Mlechchha dynasty king of Kamarupa.

== History ==
Following the reign of Vajrstamba, a copper plate inscription mentions Harsha:

The king whose brother exceeded all kings (in valour) and was regarded as the only hero by his enemies and who being unequally conditioned gave up neither valour nor his chariot and won heaven thereby.

Harshavarman was described as the heroic brother of the ruler of Kamarupa, Pralambha. Harshavarman left Kamarupa proper and lived in Gauda, which was part of Kamarupa at the time. The inscription of Jayadeva which mentions "Harshadeva" had been attributed to him as the ruler of Gauda, Udra, Kalinga and Kosala. He was the father-in-law of Jayadeva II. Jayadeva was called the daughter's son of the ruler of Maghada, Adityasena. As a result, Harshavarman is assumed to rule around 825 AD following the death of Adityasena.

Harshavarman's rule came to an end when Yasovarman, the king of Kanauj, declared war against him. Harshavarman was killed in battle as a result. The court poet of Yasovarman, named Vakapti, left a poem known as Gauda-vaho (overthrow of Gauda), but did not mention Harshavarman's name in it. The death of Harshavarman saw anarchy in Bengal, taking advantage of the absence of strong rulers.

== Sources ==
- Baruah, Rai (1933). Early History of Kamarupa. Shillong: Don Bosco Industrial School Press.
- Vasu, Nagendranath (1922). The Social History of Kamarupa. New Delhi: Northern Book Centre.
