= Mlechchha dynasty =

Medieval dynasty from Kamarupa, Assam

Kamarupa Kingdom Mlechchha dynasty
- 650 CE–900 CE
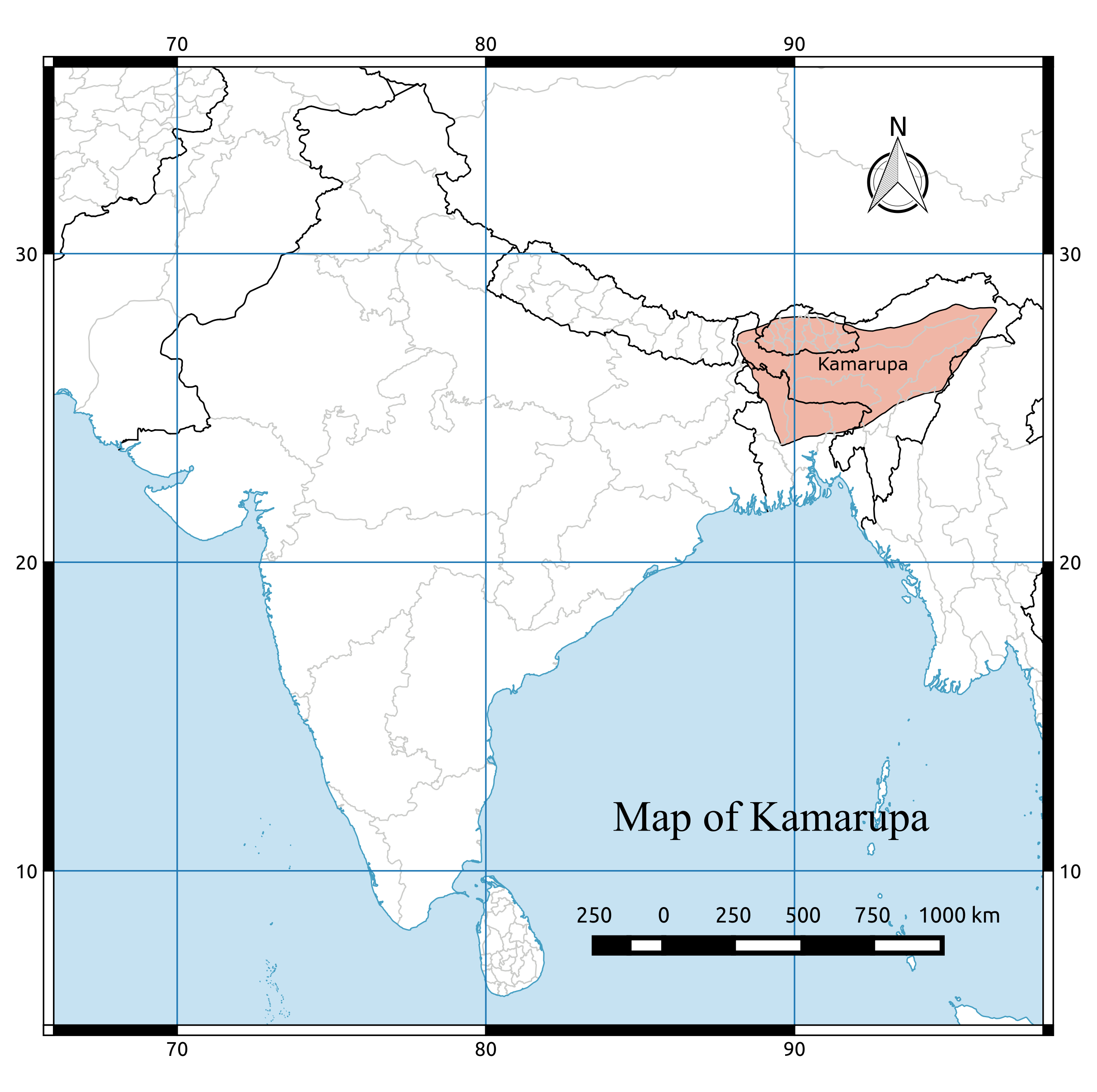
- Kamarupa Map
- Capital: Harruppesvar (present-day Tezpur)
- Religion: Shaktism, Polytheism
- Government: Monarchy
- Maharajadhiraja
  - c. 650 - c. 670: Salasthamba
  - c. 815 – c. 832: Harjjaravarman
  - c. 890 – c. 900: Tyagasimha
- Historical era: Classical India
  - Established: 650 CE
  - Disestablished: 900 CE
Preceded by	Succeeded by
Varman dynasty	Pala dynasty (Kamarupa)

The Mlechchha dynasty (c. 650 - 900) ruled Kamarupa from their capital at Harruppesvar in present-day Tezpur, Assam, after the fall of the Varman dynasty.According to historical records, there were twenty one rulers in this dynasty, but the line is obscure and names of some intervening rulers are not known. Like all other Kamarupa dynasties a semi-mythical lineage from Narakasura was constructed to accord legitimacy to their rule. The Mlechchha dynasty in Kamarupa was followed by the Pala kings. The dynasty is unrelated to the previous Varman dynasty.

== Origins and etymology ==
It is not clear how Salasthambha, the first of this dynasty, came to power.

Suniti Kumar Chatterji as well Dineshchandra Sircar propose that Salastambha was a Bodo-Kachari chief of Mech, which was later sanskritized to Mleccha. (Note: Scholars have noted that "along with the inscriptional and literary evidence, the archaeological remains of the Kamakhya temple, which stands on top of the Nilacala, testify that the Mlecchas gave a significant impetus to construct or reconstruct the Kamakhya temple.")

The distinct mention of Sala-stambha as being a lord of the Mlecchas, as in the Bargaon copper-plate of the 19th century, would appear to make it clear that he was a Bodo chief of the Mèch tribe (Sanskritised as Mlēccha), who followed Bhaskara-varman in assuming the rulership of Assam According to D.C. Sircar, 'Mleccha' may be sanskritized form of tribal name 'mech'an inscription from the reign of a king from the later Pala dynasty claims him to be a mlecchādhināth (Lord of The Mlecchas).

An illegible explanation of theirs being called mlecchas was provided over the Hayunthal Plates, too. Symbolically, Mleccha designation could mean suppression of Vedic religion and the predominance of tantric vamacara practised by saivites and saktas. So, ethnic identity of Salastambha family could be same as Varmans but came to be known as mlecchas. According to some historians, the remnant of the Mlechchha kingdom formed the later Kachari kingdom.

== History ==
Some historians refer to other inscriptions for further insight into Bhaskaravarman's successor, such as the Sanskrit play Mudrārākṣasa by the poet Viśākhadatta, who is assumed to have lived in Kamarupa. This is because analysis of his name implies that he was among the colony of Brahmins settled by Bhutivarman and reissued by Bhaskavarman. The end of the play in the final verse references the patron king whose name is reconstructed in several forms but is surmised to be Avantivarma. By conjecture historians argue that Avantivarma was the final ruler of the Varman dynasty before being overthrown by Salasthambha within the five years of his rule and being killed by him.

May King Avantivarman with his prosperous connections and servants long protect the earth, he who is a kingly manifestation of that self-existent God, to whose tusk, when He had assumed the form of the Boar, fitted to grant protection, the Earth of yore clung amigst universal destruction and on whose arms she nows leans being frightened by the Mlechhas.

— Early History of Kamarupa

Avantivarman follows the naming system of previous kings and in Vishakhadatta's play a reference to Varaha is made in the final verse alongside the patronage of the king. The final verse of the play also uses the word udvejyamānā referring to the Mlechha unrest throughout the Kamarupa country. Ghosh argues that Avantivarman is the son of Bhaskaravarman. Avantivarman was the father of Grahavarman of Moukhari. The death of Bhaskaravarman had led to the boiling of a mass Mlechha revolt which the poem had described. This brewing of the revolt is attributed partly to Bhaskaravarman who stayed in Karnasuvarna and was absent from Kamarupa in the latter part of his reign. Thus, Vishakadatta's perceived danger of the Mlechha revolt materialised.

Other authors, such as Baruah, argue that since Bhaskaravarman was known as Kumara-Raja, it implied he was a bachelor with no direct heir. His immediate successor was rather usurped by Salasthamba.

Salasthamba has been argued to be a chief of Mech ethnicity. The name Mlechha is argued to derive from the ethnonym of the Mech people. Salasthamba's title of Mlechhadhinatha implies that he may have been the Governor of the Mech country due to its vastly expanded borders under Bhaskaravarman. Salasthama would have been the governor of Mech Country who overthrew Bhaskaravarman's successor and self-proclaimed himself as King.

Other historians argue that if Salastambha was a Mech ruler then the inscriptions would use the term Kirata. The use of the word Mlechchhas implies that, despite the commonly claimed heritage from the same dynasty, the Salastambha clan seemed to have non Aryan practices. To justify this status, the Hayungthal plate inscriptions narrate a myth of a curse similar to a curse by Vasistha in Kālikāpurāṇa.

Chapter 81 narrates that Yama, Brahma and Vishnu requested Shiva to create a situation where Yama could exercise his authority. Thus, Shiva's devotees and Ugratārā's devotees drove the Aryans out of Kamarupa. This led Vasistha, who was nearly a victim himself, to curse the devotees into becoming Mlechhas. This narrative shows the suppression of Vedic Brahmanical Religion and the predominance of the Tantric Vāmācāra cult of Shiva and Ugratārā. Thus, the term Mlecchas refers to the family's adherence to the Tantic Vāmācāra cult.

The Mlechha dynasty king Harshavarman was recorded powerful enough to conquer new territories in the south and west of which the Kingdom was able to expand towards. Harshavarma's Karamarupa conytrolled the present provinces of Assam, Bengal, Bihar and Orissa with the possible eastern area of Uttar Pradesh and the Northern portion of Madras.

However, harshavarman's empire did not last. Yasovarman of Kanauj competed with him for control of Northern India. At the Battle of Bihar Harshavarman was defeated and killed. Yasovarman's court poet, Vakapati, wrote a poem, Gaudavadha (transl. overthrow of Gauda) to record this military victory.

Albeit, Vakapati did not name Harshavarman as the defeated King. The overthrow of the king led to anarchy in Bengal. Historians argue that it is not definitively known if Gauda was conquered by Harshavarman or his precessor but that the first quarter of the eight century saw Gauda, Odra, Kaling and Koshala under the kings of Kamarupa. The conquering of Gauda was likely inherited to Harshavarman after Bhaskavarman had done it a century earlier. Bhaskavarman also conquered Bengal, except for Samtata. Harshavarman's death led to the disintegration of the Kamarupa Empire made by Bhakaravarman. The result was a small country in Northern Bengal known as Kamarupa.

== Rulers ==
The grants of Ratnapala give the list of 21 kings from Salastambha to his line.

- Salastamba (650–670)
- Vijaya alias Vigrahastambha
- Palaka
- Kumara
- Vajradeva
- Harshadeva alias Harshavarman (725–745)
- Balavarman II
- Jivaraja
- Digleswaravarman
- Pralambha (Note: Pralambha, read from the Tezpur plates, can be corrected to Salambha, in light of the Parbatiya plates,)
- Harjjaravarman (815–832)
- Vanamalavarmadeva (832–855)
- Jayamala alias Virabahu (855–860)
- Balavarman III (860–880)
- Tyagasimha (890–900)
