= Rishi Bankim Chandra College =

College in West Bengal, India

- Type: Undergraduate college
- Established: 1947; 79 years ago
- Affiliations: West Bengal State University
- Principal: Goutam Kumar Ghosh
- Location: Naihati, West Bengal, 743165, India; 22.884038°N 88.4172879°E
- Campus: Urban
- Website: www.rbccollege.ac.in

Rishi Bankim Chandra College is a general degree college located in Naihati, West Bengal, India. It offers undergraduate courses in arts, commerce and sciences. The college also offers PG courses in English and Zoology. It is affiliated to West Bengal State University.

== History ==
A couple of months after Independence, on 2 November 1947, a clan of eminent personalities, educationists and visionaries of Naihati (Barrackpore Subdivision, North 24 Parganas, West Bengal) sat together and came in agreement of setting up a college after the name of Rishi Bankim Chandra Chattopadhyay, the litterateur who gave the country the National Song.

At the very beginning, Rishi Bankim Chandra College did not have a space of its own. Classes started at the building of Naihati Mahendra High School on 15 January 1948, in the evening hours.This the day has ever been observed as the college Foundation Day. In June 1948, the college was shifted to its present premises, situated within a furlong from Bankim Chandra's ancestral home at Kantalpara (at the eastern side of Naihati railway station), as the then Executive Committee purchased the present plot of land from "Medland Bose & Co." a labour-contractor firm that used to use the land as a transit point for coolies destined mainly to the north-east tea gardens.

For the sake of better management and more intensive monitoring of the value-based education, the college was trifurcated on 13 July 1984 and two more colleges with independent entities, namely, Rishi Bankim Chandra College for Women and Rishi Bankim Chandra Evening College, were born.

== Departments and courses ==
The college is being acknowledged by the University Grant Commission for its academic service for over fifty years. Today the college has affiliation from West Bengal State University for Honours and General (B.A., B.Sc., B.Com. Honours & General) undergraduate studies in as many as Twenty one (21) subjects namely, Bengali, English, Sanskrit, Hindi, Urdu, History, Political Science, Philosophy, Journalism & Mass Communication, Physical Education, Chemistry, Physics, Mathematics, Statistics, Computer Applications, Botany, Zoology, Microbiology, Electronics, Economics and Commerce. The College also offers P.G. courses in English and Zoology.

=== Science ===
Science faculty consists of the departments of Chemistry, Physics, Mathematics, Statistics, Computer Applications, Botany, Zoology, Microbiology, Electronics, and Economics.

=== Arts & Commerce ===
Arts and Commerce faculty consists of departments of Bengali, English, Sanskrit, Hindi, Urdu, History, Political Science, Philosophy, Journalism & Mass Communication, Physical Education and Commerce.

== Library ==
The Central Library is located on the second floor of the North Block, established in the early 21st century. It has a rich collection of textbooks, reference books, newspapers and magazines. Apart from this, supplementary books, journals and magazines are also available in the library. The library has two large reading rooms which can accommodate 60 students and 25 teachers at a time. It has provision for futuristic development and upgradation of services through computerization and storage of quality reference material in digital-text formats.

== Accreditation ==
The Rishi Bankim Chandra college is recognized by the University Grants Commission (UGC). It is accredited by the National Assessment and Accreditation Council (NAAC), and awarded B^{++} grade for the second cycle in 2016.

== Notable alumni ==
- Partha Bhowmick
- Raj Chakraborty
- Ajoy Biswas

== See also ==
- Education in India
- List of colleges in West Bengal
- Education in West Bengal
