= Panchanan Ghoshal =

Indian criminologist, writer (1908–1990)

- Born: 1 June 1908 Naihati, Kolkata, Bengal Presidency, British India (now in North 24 Parganas, West Bengal)
- Died: 19 January 1990 (aged 81) Kolkata, West Bengal, India
- Occupation: Writer, criminologist, social worker

Panchanan Ghoshal (1 June 1908 — 19 January 1990) was a Bengali writer, criminologist and social worker.

== Career ==
Ghoshal was born in a Zaminder family of Naihati, Presently in North 24 Parganas in British India. He passed M.Sc. in Zoology and Ph.D. in Psychology. Criminology was his special paper. While Ghoshal served in Jorasanko police station, Rabindranath Tagore inspired him to write on the subject of crime and criminals. He retired as Deputy Inspector General from Indian Imperial Police service. He was first Indian to be awarded a doctorate degree in Criminal psychology.

== Literary works ==
Ghoshal's first short story Nicher Samaj was published in Kollol Magazine. He became lecturer of Calcutta University and guest lecturer of many institutions and universities all over India. He wrote many articles, novels and books in Bengali, Hindi, Oria and English in criminology and criminal psychology. His most notable contribution is Aparadhbiggan in 8 volumes explaining cause and effect of crime in society as well as mentality of criminals and their reformation. Ghoshal was one of the pioneer of Indian crime literature. His others books are:

- Police Bahini
- Shramik Biggan
- Hindu Pranibiggan
- Aporadh Tadonto
- Kishore Oporadhi
- Ami Jokhon Police Chilam
- Bikhyato Bichar O Tadanta Kahini
- Roktonodir Dhara
- Andhokarer Desh
- Khoon Ranga Ratri
- Ami Jader Dekhechi
- Amar Dekha Meyera
- Pocketmar
- Ekti Advut Mamla
- Odhoston Prithibi
- Nagarir Avishap
- Jagroto Bharat
- Ekaṭi Narī Hatyā
- Ekaṭi Nirmama Hatyā

== Social works ==
Ghoshal established residential schools, model girls school, library, medical center at Madral village near Naihati. He founded a school in red light area of Kolkata for the education of children of prostitute. He also established reformatory school, agricultural firm and industrial training center. He donated his personal collections in Crime museum in India. Ghoshal was the founder editor of Kolkata Police journal.
