= Narakasura =

Asura king in Hindu mythology

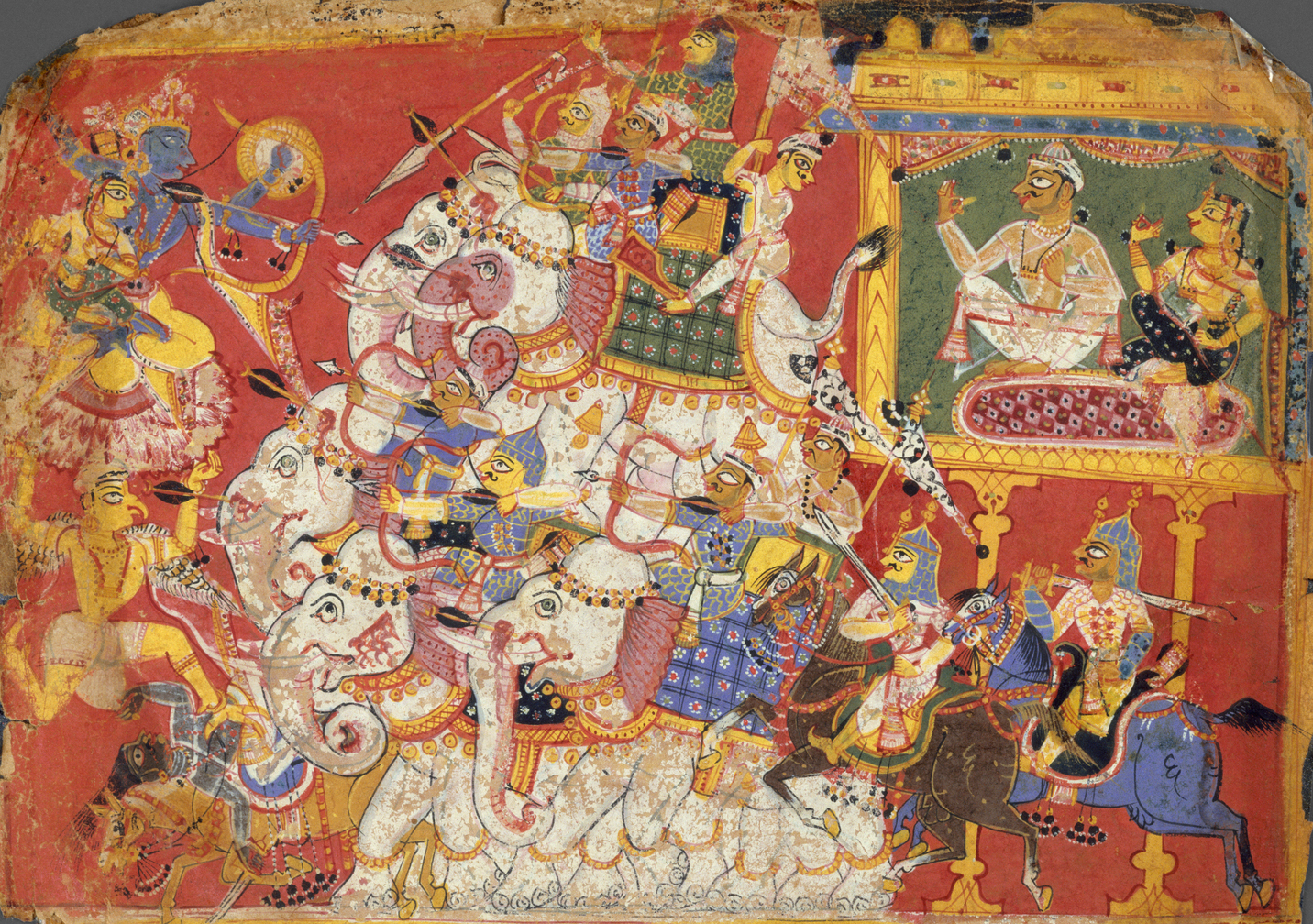
- Krishna and Satyabhama fighting Naraka's armies - Painting from the Metropolitan Museum

Information
- Gender: Male
- Spouse: Maya (Princess of Vidarbha)
- Children: Bhagadatta (son)
- Relatives: Bhumi (mother); Varaha (father)
- Dynasty: Bhauma

Narakasura, also known as Naraka, was a mythical asura king, the legendary progenitor of all three dynasties of Pragjyotisha-Kamarupa, and the founding ruler of the legendary Bhauma dynasty of Pragjyotisha. Though the myths about Naraka are first mentioned in the Mahabharata, later texts embellish them. According to later post-Vedic texts such as the Brahma Purana and Vishnu Purana, he was the son of Bhumi, fathered by the Varaha incarnation of Vishnu. He was killed by Krishna and Satyabhama. His son Bhagadatta—of Mahabharata fame—succeeded him.

The 10th/11th-century Kalika Purana embellishes the myths further and he is claimed to have come from Mithila and said to have established the kingdom of Pragjyotisha after overthrowing the last of the Kirata kings, Ghatakasura, of the Danava dynasty. It was foretold that he would be destroyed by a later incarnation of Vishnu. His mother, the earth, sought the boon from Vishnu that her son should have a long life, and that he should be all-powerful. Vishnu granted these boons.

The legends of Naraka is important in the history of Assam, particularly Kamarupa; since Narakasura is cited as the progenitor of all three dynasties that ruled Kamarupa in historical times. A hill, to the south of Guwahati is named after him. He is also associated with the Hindu belief of the shakti goddess and place of worship Kamakhya.

== Literary development of the Narakasura story ==
Naraka and his kingdom, Pragjyotisha, find mention in both the Mahabharata and the Ramayana, in the sections which were written down not before the first century, where he is not depicted as the son of Bhudevi (earth) and Varaha incarnation of Vishnu. His son, Bhagadatta, is said to have fought for the Kauravas in the Mahabharata battle. Though the boar Prajapati finds mention as early as the Satapatha Brahmana and the Taittriya Aranyaka from the mid-first millennium BCE, the avatars were associated with Vishnu later, and became popular in the Gupta period (320-550 CE) and that the contact with Bhumi engendered a son is first mentioned in the Book II of the Harivamsa which is assigned to the fifth century. This theme, that of the son Naraka, is further expanded in the later Vishnu Purana (5th-9th century). In the 7th-century Nidhanpur copperplate inscription, Naraka is claimed as the originator of the Varman dynasty and that he lived three thousand years earlier. The Bhagavata Purana (8th-10th century), which was composed even later, expands the story even further. The Naraka myth gets the most extensive elaboration in the Upapurana called Kalika Purana (10th century), which was composed in Kamarupa itself. Here, the legend of Janaka of Videha, the father of Sita, is embellished and added to the legend of Narakasura.

== Legend ==
=== Origin ===
The previous birth of Narakasura is described in the Bhagavata Purana. It is stated that there once lived a king with 16,100 daughters. Vishnu visited the palace of this king in the guise of a hermit, and all of these damsels surrounded the man. Their father, the king, grew angry with them, and issued a curse upon them all. When his daughters wept and begged their father to be relieved from the curse, he relented and allowed them the prospect of being the wives of the deity in their next birth. It was this king who would become Narakasura in his next birth, and the 16,000 daughters would be the princesses he abducted.

=== Birth ===
The birth of Narakasura is narrated in various texts. In Kalika Purana and other texts, Varaha is mentioned as Naraka's father. The pious Naraka became evil due to his association with an asura named Banasura of Śoṇitapura, and hence the suffix 'asura' (demon) was added to his name.

=== Conquest ===
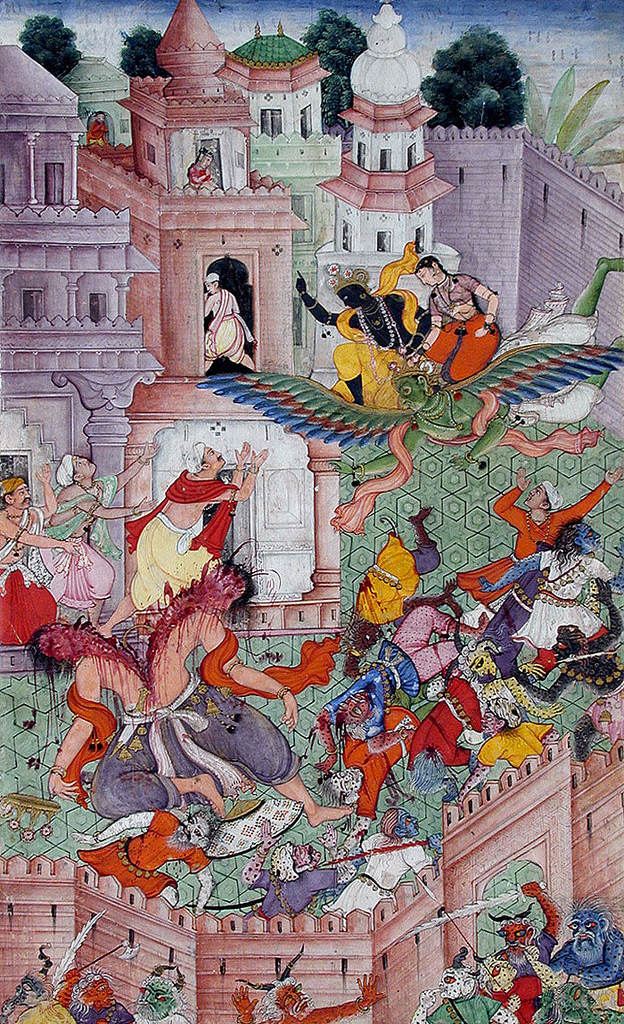
Krishna kills Narakasura by splitting him into two halves

Drunk with power, as he considered himself to be unrivaled in prowess, he brought all the kingdoms on earth under his control. Next, he turned his eyes towards Svarga. Even the mighty Indra could not withstand the assault of this son of Vishnu and Bhumi, and had to flee the heavens. Narakasura had become the overlord of both the heavens and earth. Addicted to power, he stole the earrings of Aditi, the heavenly mother goddess, and usurped some of her territories, while also kidnapping 16,100 women. All the devas, led by Indra, went to Vishnu to ask him to deliver them from Narakasura. Vishnu promised them that he would attend to this matter, when he would be incarnated as Krishna.

=== Death ===
As promised to the earth goddess, Naraka was allowed to enjoy a long reign. At last, Vishnu was born as Krishna. Aditi, who was a relative of Krishna's wife Satyabhama (believed to be an avatar of Bhumi - Narakasura's biological mother), approached Satyabhama for help. When Satyabhama heard of the Narakasura's ill-treatment of women and his behaviour with Aditi, she was enraged. Satyabhama approached Krishna for permission to wage a war against Narakasura. As promised to the devas and Aditi, Krishna attacked the great fortress of Narakasura, riding his mount Garuda with wife Satyabhama. Krishna used the Narayanastra and the Agneyastra against the army of Narakasura. The battle was furiously fought. Narakasura possessed 11 Akshauhinis that he unleashed on Krishna. However, the deity slew them all with little effort.

Krishna also killed Mura, Narakasura's general. Thus, Krishna is called 'Murāri' (the killer of Mura).

Narakasura used several divine weapons against Krishna, but the latter easily countered all those weapons. Narakasura employed the Brahmastra against Krishna, but Krishna neutralised it with his own Brahmastra. Narakasura used the Agneyastra against Krishna, but Krishna nullified it with the Varunastra, dismaying Narakasura. Narakasura hurled the Nagapasha against Krishna, but Krishna negated it with the Garudastra. In desperation, Narakasura launched the Vaishnavastra on Krishna, but Krishna met it with another Vaishnavastra. At last, when Narakasura tried to kill Krishna with a trident, Krishna pretended to swoon, because of a boon that Narakasura could be killed only by the one who gave birth to him. Outraged, Satyabhama attacked Narakasura and Krishna killed him with his Sudarshana Chakra (discus) by splitting Narakasura into two halves.

=== Staircase story ===
In Assamese tradition, Naraka, motivated by his desire, wanted to marry the goddess Kamakhya. When he proposed, the goddess playfully placed a condition before him that if he would be able to build a staircase from the bottom of the Nilachal Hill to the temple within one night before the cock crows to indicate dawn, then She would surely marry him. Naraka took it as a challenge and tried all with his might to do this huge task. He was almost about to accomplish the job before it was dawn. When Kamakhya received this news, She created a cock and made it crow untimely to give the impression of dawn to Naraka. Duped by the trick, Naraka thought that it was a futile job and left it halfway through. Later, he chased the cock and killed it. According to regional tradition, this site is identified with the village of Kukurakata.

== In popular culture ==
It is believed in some traditions that before Narakasura's death, he requested a boon from Satyabhama (incarnation of Bhudevi), that everyone should celebrate his death with colourful lights. Thus, this day is celebrated as 'Naraka Chaturdashi' - the beginning day of Deepavali. Krishna's and Satyabhama's victory over Narakasura and Narakasura's death is venerated as the occasion of freedom for all his prisoners, and in honour of Aditi.

== See also ==
- Banasura
- Varaha
- Tarakasura
- Mura

== Bibliography ==
- Barua, Kanak Lal (1933). Early History of Kamarupa. Author.
- Boruah, Nirode (2005). "'Early State' Formation in the Brahmaputra Valley of Assam". Proceedings of the Indian Historical Congress. 66: 1464–1465. JSTOR 44145968.
- Sharma, Mukunda Madhava (1978). Inscriptions of Ancient Assam. Gauhati University, Assam.
- Sircar, D C (1990), "Epico-Puranic Myths and Allied Legends", in Barpujari, H K (ed.), The Comprehensive History of Assam, vol. I, Guwahati: Publication Board, Assam, pp. 79–93
- Sircar, D C (1971), Studies in the Religious Life of Ancient and Medieval India, Delhi: Motilal Banarasi Das
- Smith, William L (2007), "Assam: Shankaradeva's Parijata Harana Nata", in Bryant, Edwin F. (ed.), Krishna: A Source Book, Oxford University Press, pp. 163–186
- Mani, Vettam (1976), Puranic Encyclopedia: Comprehensive Dictionary with Special Reference to the Epics and the Puranas, South Asia Books
