= Pragjyotisha kingdom =

Mythological kingdom in Hinduism

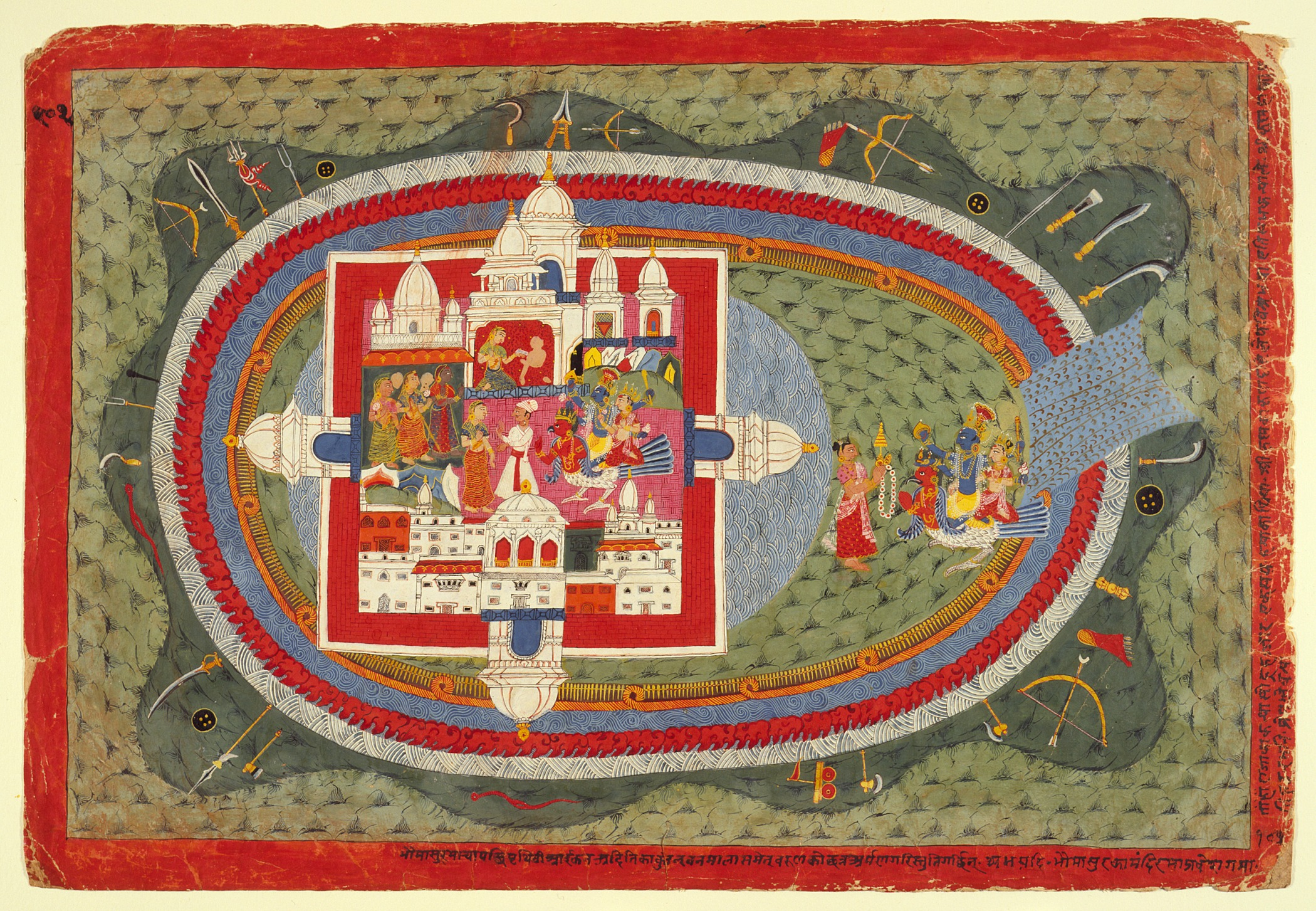
- A scene involving king Naraka
- Status: Legendary

Pragjyotisha is a mythological kingdom that is mentioned in a multitude of Hindu epics. It came to be associated with the historical Kamarupa after Bhaskaravarman of the Varman dynasty by drawing his lineage from Naraka/Bhagadatta of the legendary Pragjyotisha to bring his peripheral kingdom closer to mainland traditions at a time when he was emerging as a powerful king with interests in North India. The identification with the mythical Naraka/Bhagadatta lineage continued to be used by the Mlechchhas and Palas for roughly similar purposes.

== Scriptures ==
All early references do not locate Pragjyotisha in Northeast India. The first mentions of this kingdom are found in the Ramayana and the Mahabharata, in sections not written much earlier than the first century. In the Kishkindha Kanda of the former, Pragjyotisha is placed in the west near Mount Varaha on the sea. In Aswamedha-Parva of the latter, Arjuna defeated Vajradatta of Pragjyotisha in a three-day battle near Punjab in the Lower Indus Valley; the Harivamsa Parva features multiple mentions as well. The kingdom was contemporary of Bana kingdom.

== Popular culture ==
A popular mythical narrative claims that Jyotisha is the sanskritised form of Zuhthis, who were (apparently) the first migrants to Assam from China — this has little historical evidence in support.

== See also ==
- Mahabharata War
- Sonitpura kingdom
- Kingdoms of Ancient India
