= Kalika Purana =

Minor Purana of Hinduism

The Kalika Purana (Sanskrit: कालिकापुराणम्, Kālikā Purāṇa), also called the Kali Purana, Sati Purana or Kalika Tantra, one of the eighteen minor Puranas (Upapurana) in the Shaktism tradition of Hinduism, was likely composed in the region between Assam and Koch Bihar. The text contains the legend in which Devi encourages Shiva to fall in love. It also references sacrifices dedicated to Devi. The text also gives descriptions of landmarks such as the mountains at Kamarupa, the Brahmaputra River, and the Kamakhya Temple. It is said to have been created by Markandeya. The text has a number of variations in its format, with some versions comprising either 90 or 93 chapters, and is distinct in its structure from other major and minor Puranas.

== Background ==
The text is part of the eighteen minor Puranas in Shaktism. The text was likely composed in a region between Assam and Koch Bihar region of India and is attributed to the sage Markandeya. (Note: The Kālikāpurāṇa is one of the earliest texts devoted to the worship of Kāmākhyā and likely compiled in the tenth or eleventh century within the area of modern day West Bengal.) (Note: Research has noted that "Assam from ancient times, was known as Kamarupa till the end of the Koch rule (17th century) and ancient Kamarupa comprised the whole of North Bengal including Cooch-Behar, and the Rangpur and Jalpaiguri districts of Bengal. Its permanent western boundary is said to have been the river Karatoya in North Bengal according to the Kalika Purana and Yoginitantra, both devoted to geographical accounts of ancient Kamarupa.")

Some scholarship purports that it is a late work by Nibandha writers about Shakti worship. as the work belongs to the goddess-oriented Shakta branch of Hinduism. It may have been composed in or near medieval Kamarupa (modern day Assam). The local descriptions, the exposition of the myth of Naraka (Note: The myth of Naraka originated to justify where the dynasties of Kamarupa drew their lineage.), the description of the myth of Brahmaputra river, and the claim in the text that Kamarupa was holier than Varanasi point to the text possibly having been composed during the Kamarupa period.

Other scholarship proposes the text is older, with the origin of that text in Bengal. This is based on the fact that references to both Kālidāsa and Magha suggest that it is not one of the early Puranas. The mention of places and events associated with Ratna Pala (920-960) of the Kamarupa region could suggest the text was created around the tenth century.

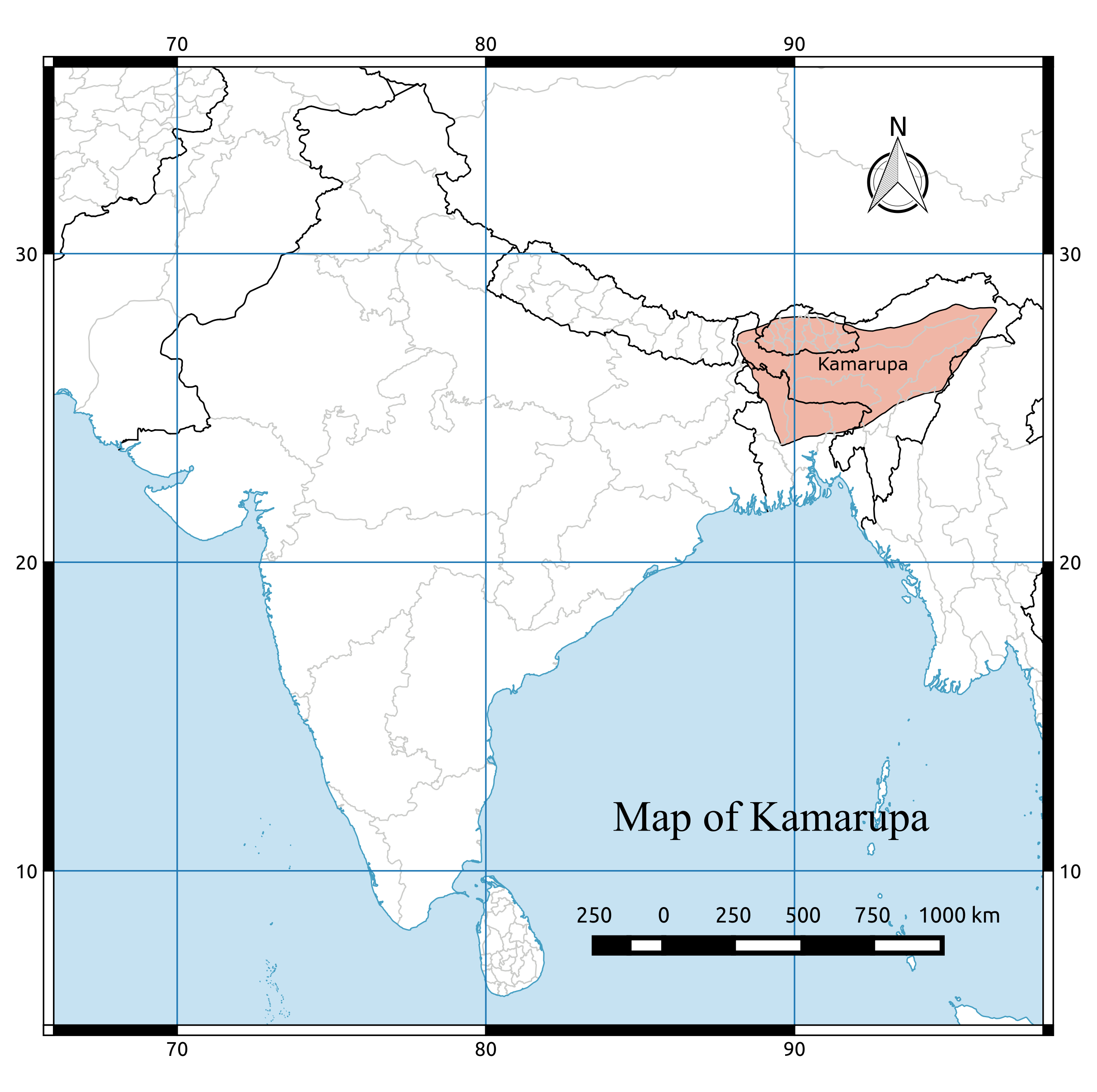
Map of the region of Kamarupa, which is now part of modern day Assam.

The mention of king Dharmapala of Kamarupa has led to proposals of the text being created in the eleventh or twelfth century. However, estimates for different sections of the text range from seventh to the twelfth centuries. Reasons given for the earlier text date also include the fact that within the text itself it references the Mleccha population (Note: Mleccha (Sanskrit: म्लेच्छ, romanized: mlecchá) is often translated as 'foreign' and is sometimes written as 'mlechchha.' It refers to those who were separate from the Vedic tribes. Those who were not part of the varna system or Vedic Tribal society were sometimes historically referred to as mleccha.) and the Hyunthal copper plate inscription belonging to Harjaravarman. These contribute to an earlier possible text date, around the time of the reign of Harjaravarman. (Note: Harjaravarman's reign is estimated from 815 to 832.)

The earliest printed edition of the text was published by Venkateshvara Press in Bombay (modern day Mumbai) in 1907 (Note: This corresponds to the date 1829 in the Hindu calendar in use at the time, which would have corresponded with the Śaka or Shaka era.) followed by the Vangavasi Press in Calcutta (modern day Kolkata) in 1909. (Note: The date would have been 1316 at the time, using the Bangabda calendar system.)

== Content ==
A close-up photograph of a shrine to the goddess Kali, surrounded by decorations with devotees gathered in the foreground.

It is one of the rare Hindu texts that actually mentions the word "Hindu".

It exists in many versions, organized in e 90 to 93 chapters. The surviving versions of the text are unusual in that they start abruptly and follow a format not found in either the major or minor Purana-genre mythical texts of Hinduism.

The text starts off with the legend of Devi trying to bring Shiva back from ascetic life into that of a householder's by making him fall in love again. According to Ludo Rocher, Markandeya describes how Brahma, Shiva and Vishnu are "one and the same" and that all goddesses (Sati, Parvati, Menaka, Kali and others) are manifestation of the same feminine energy. It glorifies goddess Kamakhya, or Kamakshi, and details the ritual procedures required for worshiping her.

The text describes in detail the rivers and mountains at Kamarupa tirtha and mentions the Brahmaputra River and the Kamakhya Temple.

Various types of animal sacrifices to Devi are referenced in the text. Chapters 67 through 78 comprise the Rudhiradhyaya section which contains a reference to a bali or animal sacrifice process typical within Vamacara tantrism.

The text states that a human sacrifices might also be performed to appease the goddess. However, the sacrifice is only performed before a war or when in imminent danger. Anyone physically disabled, related to a Brahmin, or unwilling to die through the sacrifice is unfit for the ritual. The text describes rituals also associated with using a rice-paste substitute for the sacrifice, but does not detail the actual process.
