= Progressive =

Progressive may refer to:

== Politics ==
- Progressivism, a political philosophy in support of social reform
  - Progressivism in the United States, the political philosophy in the American context
  - Progressivism in South Korea, the political philosophy in the South Korean context
- Progressive realism, an American foreign policy paradigm focused on producing measurable results in pursuit of widely supported goals

=== Political organizations ===
- Congressional Progressive Caucus, members within the Democratic Party in the United States Congress dedicated to the advancement of progressive issues and positions
- Progressive Alliance (disambiguation)
- Progressive Conservative (disambiguation)
- Progressive Party (disambiguation)
- Progressive Unionist (disambiguation)

=== Other uses in politics ===
- Progressive Era, a period of reform in the United States (c. 1890–1930)
- Progressive tax, a type of tax rate structure

== Arts, entertainment, and media ==
=== Music ===
- Progressive music, a type of music that expands stylistic boundaries outwards
  - Progressive pop
  - Progressive rock
  - Post-progressive
  - Progressive soul
  - Progressive house
  - Progressive rap
- Progressive, a 2015 EP by Mrs. Green Apple
- "Progressive" (song), a 2009 single by Kalafina
- "Progressive" (Megumi Ogata and Aya Uchida song), the ending theme to the 2014 video game Danganronpa Another Episode: Ultra Despair Girls
- Progressive, a demo album by the band Haggard

=== Other uses in arts, entertainment, and media ===
- Progressive chess, a chess variant
- Progressive talk radio, a talk radio format devoted to expressing liberal or progressive viewpoints of issues
- The Progressive, an American left-wing magazine

== Brands and enterprises ==
- Progressive Corporation, a U.S. insurance company
- Progressive Enterprises, a New Zealand retail cooperative

== Healthcare ==
- Progressive disease
- Progressive lens, a type of corrective eyeglass lenses

== Religion ==
- Progressive Adventism, a sect of the Seventh-day Adventist Church
- Progressive Christianity, a movement within contemporary Protestantism
- Progressive creationism, a form of Old Earth creationism
- Progressive Islam, a modern liberal interpretation of Islam
- Progressive Judaism, a major denomination within Judaism
- Progressive religion, a religious tradition which embraces theological diversity
- Progressive revelation (Bahá'í), a core teaching of Bahá'í that suggests that religious truth is revealed by God progressively and cyclically over time
- Progressive revelation (Christianity), the concept that the sections of the Bible written later contain a fuller revelation of God

== Technology ==
- Progressive disclosure, a technique used in human computer interaction
- Progressive scan, a form of video transmission
- Progressive shifting, a technique for changing gears in trucks
- Progressive stamping, a metalworking technique

== Verb forms ==
- Progressive aspect (also called continuous), a verb form that expresses incomplete action
  - Past progressive
  - Perfect progressive aspects, see Uses of English verb forms and English verbs

== Other uses ==
- Progressive education, which emphasizes a hands-on approach to learning
- Progressive Field (originally Jacobs Field), home of the Cleveland Guardians
- Progressive function, a function in mathematics
- Progressive historians, group of 20th century historians of the United States associated with a historiographical tradition that embraced an economic interpretation of American history

== See also ==
- Progress (disambiguation)
- Progression (disambiguation)
- Progressivism (disambiguation)
