= Myelin proteolipid protein =

Myelin proteolipid protein (PLP or lipophilin)

Identifiers
- Symbol: Myelin_PLP
- Pfam: PF01275
- InterPro: IPR001614
- SMART: SM00002
- PROSITE: PDOC00497
Available protein structures:
- PDB: IPR001614 PF01275 (ECOD; PDBsum)
- AlphaFold: IPR001614; PF01275

Myelin proteolipid protein (PLP or lipophilin) is the major myelin protein from the central nervous system (CNS). It plays an important role in the formation or maintenance of the multilamellar structure of myelin. The myelin sheath is a multi-layered membrane, unique to the nervous system, that functions as an insulator to greatly increase the efficiency of axonal impulse conduction.

In humans, point mutations in PLP are the cause of Pelizaeus–Merzbacher disease (PMD), a neurologic disorder of myelin metabolism. In animals demyelinating diseases such as mouse 'jimpy' or dog 'shaking pup' are also caused by mutations in PLP.

PLP is a highly conserved hydrophobic protein of 276 to 280 amino acids which seems to contain four transmembrane segments, two disulfide bonds and which covalently binds lipids (at least six palmitate groups in mammals). PLP is highly related to GPM6A, a neuronal membrane glycoprotein.

== Human proteins containing this domain ==
GPM6A; GPM6B; PLP1;

== See also ==
- PLP2
