= PRP =

PRP may refer to:

== Government ==
- Park Royal Partnership, an industrial partnership in London
- Peel Regional Police, in Ontario, Canada
- Personnel Reliability Program, a psychological evaluation of US Department of Defense personnel
- Press Recognition Panel, a UK body relating to the recognition of press regulators

== Science and technology ==
=== Medicine and biology ===
- Major prion protein, encoded by the PrP gene
- Panretinal photocoagulation, a treatment for proliferative diabetic retinopathy
- Penicillin-resistant pneumococci, a Streptococcus species resistant to antibiotics
- Pityriasis rubra pilaris, a rare skin disorder
- Platelet-rich plasma, derived from one's own blood using centrifuges, used to aid recovery from injuries
- Progressive rubella panencephalitis, a viral neurological disorder
- Proline rich protein, a class of intrinsically unstructured proteins
- Psychological refractory period, a period between processing multiple stimuli

=== Other science and technology ===
- Parallel Redundancy Protocol, a network protocol providing fault tolerance
- Petroleum Remediation Product, a substance for cleaning petroleum-based pollution
- Probable prime, a number that satisfies some requirements for prime numbers
- Pseudorandom permutation, a class of functions in cryptography
- Praseodymium monophosphide (PrP), a compound

== Places ==
- Parung Panjang railway station (station code), in Bogor Regency, West Java, Indonesia
- People's Republic of Poland, 1952–1990
- Pleasure Ridge Park, Louisville, in Kentucky, US
- Preston Park railway station (station code), in Sussex, England

== Political parties ==
- Party of the People's Revolution (French: Parti de la révolution du peuple), in the Democratic Republic of the Congo, 1967–1991
- Patriotic Renewal Party, in Honduras, 1990–1992
- Paulista Republican Party, in Brazil, 1873–1937
- People's Reconciliation Party in Burundi, founded 1991
- People's Redemption Party in Nigeria, founded 1978
- People's Reform Party in the Philippines, founded 1991
- People's Revolutionary Party (disambiguation)
- Popular Representation Party, in Brazil, 1945–1965
- Portuguese Republican Party, 1876–1911
- Praja Rajyam Party, in India, 2008–2011
- Progressive Reform Party (disambiguation)
- Progressive Republican Party (disambiguation)
- Puerto Rican Renewal Party, 1983–1987

== Other uses ==
- Pacific Resource Partnership, a Hawaiian union trade association
- Paul Raymond Publications, a British publisher of softcore pornography
- Performance-related pay
- Potentially responsible party, a possible polluter who may be held liable
- Professional registered parliamentarian

== See also ==
- Puerto Rico Police (PRPD)
