= Progressivism (disambiguation) =

Progressivism is a broad political movement.

Progressivism may also refer to:

- Progressive Party (disambiguation), multiple political organizations
- Progressive education, belief that education must be based on the principle that humans are social animals who learn best in real-life activities
- Progressive tax, increases as the taxable base amount increases
- Progressive Era, a period of reform in the United States that flourished from the 1890s to the 1920s
- Democratic Party (United States)#Progressives, the left-wing, social democratic faction of the Democratic Party

== See also ==
- Progressive (disambiguation)
- Progress (disambiguation)
