= PLP =

PLP may refer to:

== Science and technology ==
=== Computing ===
- Packet Layer Protocol, a network-layer protocol
- PL/P, a programming language
- Physical Layer Pipe (PLPs), specified in the DVB-T2 and ATSC 3.0 broadcasting standards

=== Other uses in science and technology ===
- Papain-like protease, a family of cysteine protease enzymes
- Phantom limb pain, pain felt as from a missing limb
- Proteolipid protein 1 or proteolipid protein 2, associated with Pelizaeus-Merzbacher disease
- Pyridoxal phosphate, a coenzyme, the active form of vitamin B_{6}

== Politics ==
- People's Liberation Party (disambiguation), several political parties
- Parliamentary Labour Party, a group of British Labour MPs
- Party for Freedom and Progress, a Belgian liberal political party (1961–1992)
- People's Life Party, a Japanese political party
- Pragati Legislature Party, a 1970s political party in Orissa, India
- Progressive Labour Party (disambiguation), several political parties
- Progressive Liberal Party, a Bahamian political party

== Other uses ==
- Premier League Productions
- PLP Architecture, a London, UK firm
- Pamantasan ng Lungsod ng Pasig, a university in the Philippines
- Peace Love & Pitbulls, a Swedish industrial rock band
- Phoenix Living Poets, Chatto & Windus 1960-1983 books
- Prosopographisches Lexikon der Palaiologenzeit, a German-language late Byzantine Empire dictionary
