= PDP =

PDP may refer to:

== Computing and technology ==
- Packet Data Protocol in wireless GPRS/HSDPA networks
- Parallel distributed processing in connectionism
- Plasma display panel
- Policy Decision Point in the Common Open Policy Service
- Portable DVD player
- Power-delay product, the product of power consumption times the input–output delay
- Power delay profile, signal intensity as a function of time delay
- Primary Data Point in the RRDtool
- Programmed Data Processor, Digital Equipment Corporation (DEC) minicomputers
- Project Detail Page on Microsoft Project Server
- XACML PDP (policy decision point)

== Government ==
- Post-detection policy, for extraterrestrial life
- Potato Diversion Program, a USDA program under which farmers are paid to divert potatoes
- Prescription Drug Plan in US Medicare

== Politics ==
- Partido Demokratiko Pilipino (transl. Philippine Democratic Party), a major political party in the Philippines
- Jammu and Kashmir People's Democratic Party, a political party in the Indian state of Jammu and Kashmir
- Democratic Renewal Party (Indonesia), or Partai Demokrasi Pembaruan in Indonesian
- Islamic Party (Egypt), formerly the Peace and Development Party, Egypt
- Party for Democratic Prosperity, Republic of Macedonia
- Peace and Development Party, Mogadishu, Somalia
- People's Democratic Party (disambiguation), any of a number of political parties worldwide
- Popular Democratic Party (disambiguation), any of a number of political parties worldwide
- Progressive Democratic Party (disambiguation), a number of political parties worldwide
- Papua Presidium Council, a West Papuan political organization
- Party of Democratic Progress, Bosnia and Herzegovina

== Other uses ==
- Pacific Drums and Percussion, a manufacturer
- Personal development plan
- Plastic Disclosure Project, to reduce the environmental impact of plastic
- Walther PDP, a pistol
- PewDiePie, a Swedish YouTuber
- Postsecondary Data Partnership, of the US National Student Clearinghouse
- IATA code for Capitán de Corbeta Carlos A. Curbelo International Airport, Uruguay

== See also ==
- Parliamentary and Diplomatic Protection (PaDP), London police squad
