= 2022 Siliguri Mahakuma Parishad election =

Local elections in Siliguri, India

← 2015	26 June 2022	2027 →

Gram Panchayat: 462 Panchayat Samiti: 66 Mahakuma Parishad :9
- Turnout: 81.94%

	Majority party	Minority party	Third party
Party	AITC	BJP	CPI(M)
Alliance	AITC+	NDA	SM
Last election	MP: 3	MP: 0	MP: 5
Gram Panchayat (GP)	320	86	14
Panchayat Samiti (PS)	55	9	0
Mahakuma Parishad (MP)	8 (▲5)	1 (▲1)	0 (▼5)
	Fourth party	Fifth party
Party	INC	Independents
Alliance	SM
Last election	MP: 0	MP: 0
Gram Panchayat (GP)	17	25
Panchayat Samiti (PS)	0	2
Mahakuma Parishad (MP)	0	0

The 2022 Siliguri Mahakuma Parishad election was held on 26 June 2022 to elect all members of Siliguri Mahakuma Parishad, its Panchayet Samitis and its Panchayets.

== Schedule ==
The election schedule was declared by West Bengal State Election Commission on 27 May 2022.

Poll event	Schedule
Notification Date	27 May 2022
Last Date for filing nomination	3 June 2022
Scrutiny of nomination	4 June 2022
Last Date for withdrawal of nomination	6 June 2022
Date of poll	26 June 2022
Date of counting of votes	29 June 2022

== Parties and alliances ==
Party	Symbol	Alliance	No. of contesting candidates							
Party	Symbol	Alliance	MP		PS		GP		TOTAL	
Party	Symbol	Alliance	Party wise	Alliance wise	Party wise	Alliance wise	Party wise	Alliance wise	Party wise	Alliance wise
All India Forward Bloc (AIFB)		Left Front	1	8	2	54	7	306	10	368
Communist Party of India (Marxist) (CPI(M))		Left Front	7	8	52	54	299	306	358	368
All India Trinamool Congress (AITC)		AITC+	9		66		462		537	
Bharatiya Janata Party (BJP)		NDA	9		60		391		460	
Indian National Congress (INC)		UPA	7		20		126		153	
Communist Party of India (Marxist–Leninist) Liberation CPI(ML)L*		NONE	0		1		3		4	
Socialist Unity Centre of India (Communist) SUCI(C)*		NONE	0		2		7		9	
Kamtapur People's Party KPP	As IND	NONE	0		0		5		5	
Bahujan Samaj Party		NONE	0		1		0		1	
Independents (IND)	As IND	NONE	8		27		211		246	

* Marked parties may have allotted other independents symbols as they are recognized in states other than West Bengal. Their symbols listed in the table are allotted by ECI as state parties of other states.

== Candidates ==
List of candidates
Constituency		Left Front		AITC		BJP		INC	
#	Name	Party	Candidate	Party	Candidate	Party	Candidate	Party	Candidate
1	NAXALBARI 1	CPI(M)	GAUTAM GHOSH	AITC	ARUN GHOSH	BJP	DILIP BARAI	INC supports CPI(M)	
2	NAXALBARI 2	CPI(M)	NIRODE SINGHA	AITC	NALINI RANJAN RAY	BJP	REKHA ROY (SINGHA)	INC	JYOTIRMOY BARMAN
3	MATIGARA 3	CPI(M)	SWASTIKA RAM MAHALI	AITC	JYOTI TIRKI	BJP	SUNITA ORAON	INC	MANISHA ORAON
4	MATIGARA 4	CPI(M)	MONI THAPA	AITC	PRIYANKA BISWAS	BJP	MAMPI DAS (DEBNATH)	INC	DURGA KHARKA
5	KHARIBARI 5	AIFB	KARUNAMOY CHOWDHURY	AITC	KAJAL GHOSH	BJP	AJAY ORAON (NISTU)	INC	ROSHAN KUMAR GOSWAMI
6	KHARIBARI 6	CPI(M)	BADAL CHANDRA SARKAR	AITC	KISHORI MOHAN SINGHA	BJP	UTTAM KUMAR SINGHA	INC supports CPI(M)	
7	PHANSIDEWA 7	CPI(M)	TASBIRA CHHETRI	AITC	KUMUDNI BARAIK GHOSH	BJP	RENU DEVI ROY YADAV	INC	KANCHAN SOBAR
8	PHANSIDEWA 8	Left Front supports INC		AITC	AINUL HAQUE	BJP	PRAN GOURANGA DEBNATH (PANU)	INC	SHYAMAL KUMAR MANDAL
9	PHANSIDEWA 9	CPI(M)	SANTA LAKRA	AITC	ROMA RASHMI EKKA	BJP	RADHIKA TUDU	INC	DIPTI ORAON

== Voter Turnout ==
Body Name	No of Booths	No of Voters	No of Polled Votes	Male Votes	Male%	Female Votes	Female%	Turnout %
KHARIBARI PS	112	87979	74327	38390	51. 65	35937	48. 35	84.48
MATIGARA PS	190	154784	124872	62453	50. 01	62418	49. 99	80.68
NAXALBARI PS	166	128533	102977	50953	49. 48	52024	50. 52	80.12
PHANSIDEWA PS	189	156642	130409	67188	51. 52	63221	48. 52	83.25
SILIGURI MAHAKUMA PARISHAD TOTAL	657	527938	432585	218984	50. 62	213600	51. 38	81. 94

== Result ==
=== Party-wise Result ===
Party	Alliance	No. of won seats								No. of won bodies						Secured vote share							
Party	Alliance	MP		PS		GP		Total		PS		GP		Total		MP		PS		GP		Total	
Party	Alliance	Party wise	Alliance wise	Party wise	Alliance wise	Party wise	Alliance wise	Party wise	Alliance wise	Party wise	Alliance wise	Party wise	Alliance wise	Party wise	Alliance wise	Party wise	Alliance wise	Party wise	Alliance wise	Party wise	Alliance wise	Party wise	Alliance wise
All India Forward Bloc (AIFB)	Left Front	0	0	0	0	0	14	0	14	0	0	0	0	0	0	0.78	13.50	0.60	14.73	0.51	12.11	0.63	13.45
Communist Party of India (Marxist) (CPI(M))	Left Front	0	0	0	0	14	14	14	14	0	0	0	0	0	0	12.72	13.50	14.13	14.73	11.60	12.11	12.82	13.45
All India Trinamool Congress (AITC)	AITC+	8		55		320		383		4		19		23		45.56		45.77		47.68		46.34	
Bharatiya Janata Party (BJP)	NDA	1		9		86		96		0		0		0		28.98		29.53		27.34		28.62	
Indian National Congress (INC)	UPA	0		0		17		17		0		0		0		5.65		3.81		4.79		4.75	
Communist Party of India (Marxist–Leninist) Liberation CPI(ML)L*	NONE	0		0		0		0		0		0		0		0.00		0.25		0.30		0.18	
Socialist Unity Centre of India (Communist) SUCI(C)*	NONE	0		0		0		0		0		0		0		0.00		0.25		0.30		0.18	
Kamtapur People's Party KPP	NONE	0		0		0		0		0		0		0		0.00		0.25		0.30		0.18	
Bahujan Samaj Party BSP	NONE	0		0		0		0		0		0		0		0.00		0.25		0.30		0.18	
Independents (IND)	NONE	0		2		25		27		0		0		0		6.32		5.90		7.79		6.67	
TOTAL		9		66		462		537		4		22		26		100.00		100.00		100.00		100.00	

=== MP-wise result ===
Results
Ward number	Winner			Runner Up			Margin
Ward number	Party	Candidate	Votes	Party	Candidate	Votes	Margin
Naxalbari 1	AITC	Arun Ghosh	23,888	CPI(M)	Gautam Ghosh	12,644	11,244
Naxalbari 2	AITC	Nalini Ranjan Ray	24,055	BJP	Rekha Roy Singha	15,078	8,977
Matigara 3	AITC	Jyoti Tirkey	24,574	BJP	Sunita Oraon	18,080	6,494
Matigara 4	AITC	Priyanka Biswas	32,511	BJP	Mampi Das Debnath	22,568	9,943
Kharibari 5	BJP	Ajay Oraon	17,473	AITC	Kajal Ghosh	15,921	1,552
Kharibari 6	AITC	Kishori Mohan Singha	15,399	BJP	Uttam Kumar Singha	10,382	5,017
Phansidewa 7	AITC	Kumundi Baraik Ghosh	19,266	BJP	Renu Devi Roy Yadav	11,783	7,483
Phansidewa 8	AITC	Ainul Haque	19,594	IND	Mohammad Akhtar Ali	17,937	1,657
Phansidewa 9	AITC	Roma Rashmi Ekka	22,471	BJP	Radhika Tudu	7,661	14,810

=== PS-wise Result ===
PS	Total Seats	Seats for majority	AITC+	LF	UPA	NDA	IND	OTHERS	Comment
PS	Total Seats	Seats for majority	Seats	Seats	Seats	Seats	Seats	Seats	Comment
KHARIBARI	12	7	9	0	0	3	0	0	AITC
MATIGARA	15	8	12	0	0	3	0	0	AITC
NAXALBARI	18	10	17	0	0	1	0	0	AITC
PHANSIDEWA	21	11	17	0	0	2	2	0	AITC
Total	66		55	0	0	9	2	0	-

=== GP-wise Result ===
PS	GP	Total Seats	Seats for majority	AITC+	LF	UPA	NDA	IND	OTHERS	Comments
PS	GP	Total Seats	Seats for majority	Seats	Seats	Seats	Seats	Seats	Seats	Comments
KHARIBARI	BINNABARI	13	7	8	0	0	5	0	0	AITC
KHARIBARI	BURAGANJ	22	12	13	3	1	3	2	0	AITC
KHARIBARI	KHARIBARI-PANISHALI	17	9	11	1	1	4	0	0	AITC
KHARIBARI	RANIGANJ-PANISHALI	27	14	14	0	0	8	5	0	AITC
KHARIBARI	Total in PS	79		47	4	2	19	7	0	-
MATIGARA	ATHARAKHAI	30	16	20	1	2	7	0	0	AITC
MATIGARA	CHAMPASARI	26	14	24	1	0	1	1	0	AITC
MATIGARA	MATIGARA I	14	8	8	0	2	4	0	0	AITC
MATIGARA	MATIGARA II	25	13	23	0	0	2	0	0	AITC
MATIGARA	PATHARGHATA	28	15	14	3	1	9	1	0	HUNG
MATIGARA	Total in PS	123		88	5	5	23	2	0	-
NAXALBARI	GOSSAIPUR	19	10	15	0	0	4	0	0	AITC
NAXALBARI	HATIGHISA	16	9	14	0	0	1	1	0	AITC
NAXALBARI	LOWER BAGDOGRA	21	11	17	1	0	3	0	0	AITC
NAXALBARI	MANIRAM	18	10	13	0	0	5	0	0	AITC
NAXALBARI	NAKSHALBARI	26	14	18	2	1	4	1		AITC
NAXALBARI	UPPER BAGDOGRA	21	11	11	0	7	2	1	0	AITC
NAXALBARI	Total in PS	121		88	3	8	19	3	0	-
PHANSIDEWA	BIDHANNAGAR I	19	10	18	0	0	0	1	0	AITC
PHANSIDEWA	BIDHANNAGAR II	18	10	14	1	0	2	1	0	AITC
PHANSIDEWA	CHATHAT-BANSGAON	18	10	9	0	0	1	8	0	HUNG
PHANSIDEWA	GHOSPUKUR	22	12	20	0	0	2	0	0	AITC
PHANSIDEWA	HETMURI-SINGIJHORA	24	13	16	1	0	6	1	0	AITC
PHANSIDEWA	JALAS-NIJAMTARA	22	12	11	0	0	10	1	0	HUNG
PHANSIDEWA	PHANSIDEWA-BANSGAON-KISMAT	16	9	9	0	2	4	1	0	AITC
PHANSIDEWA	Total in PS	139		97	2	2	25	13	0	-
Overall Total		462		320	14	17	86	25	0	-
