= Progres =

Progres may refer to:

- Progres, Kardzhali Province, a village in Momchilgrad Municipality, Kardzhali Province, Bulgaria
- El Progrés, Badalona, Catalonia, Spain
- Toyota Progrès, a mid-sized Japanese luxury sedan
- FC Progrès Niederkorn (aka Progrès), Niederkorn, Luxembourg; a soccer team
- PROGRES (Programme of Research on the Service Economy)
- Le Progrès, a daily newspaper from Lyon, Rhone, France
- Le Progrès (Réunion), a political party
- 'Progres 2', a Czech rock band

== See also ==
- Haïti Progrès, a daily U.S. newspaper focused on Haiti
- Le Progrès Egyptien, a daily French-language Egyptian newspaper
- Progress (disambiguation)
