= Progressive Democratic Party =

Progressive Democratic Party may refer to:

- Progressive Democratic Party of Afghanistan, founded 1966
- Progressive Democratic Party (Bangladesh), founded 2007
- Progressive Democratic Party (Gibraltar), 2006–2013
- Progressive Democratic Party of Guadeloupe, founded 1991
- Progressive Democratic Party (Kosovo), formed in 2014
- Progressive Democratic Party (Liberia), formed in 2005
- Progressive Democratic Party of the North, in Luxembourg, 1931–1937
- Progressive Democratic Party (Malaysia), formed in 2002 as Sarawak Progressive Democratic Party
- Progressive Democratic Party (Montserrat), 1970–1987
- Progressive Democratic Party (Paraguay), created in 2007
- Progressive Democrats, in Ireland, 1985–2009
- Progressive Democratic Party (Thailand), 2005–2007
- Progressive Democratic Party (Trinidad and Tobago), 1946–1956
- Progressive Democratic Party (Tunisia), 1983–2012
- Progressive Democratic Party (South Carolina), in the United States, 1944–1948
- Progressive Democratic Party (Spain), a Spanish conservative political party, founded in 1978

== See also ==
- Democratic Progressive Party (disambiguation)
- Progressive Party (disambiguation)
- Progress Party (disambiguation)
- PDP (disambiguation)
- Lists of political parties
