= Anant Maharaj =

Indian social activist and Politician

Nagendra Ray

Member of Parliament, Rajya Sabha
- Incumbent
- Assumed office 19 August 2023
- President: Droupadi Murmu
- Chairman of the House: C. P. Radhakrishnan
- Preceded by: Pradip Bhattacharya
- Constituency: West Bengal

Personal details
- Party: Greater Cooch Behar Democratic Party

Nagendra Ray, also commonly known as Anant Maharaj, is an Indian politician belonging to the Greater Cooch Behar Democratic Party. He was elected to the Rajya Sabha the upper house of the Indian Parliament unopposed from West Bengal as the candidate from Bharatiya Janata Party.

== Demand for separate state ==
Maharaj demanded separate Cooch state, but after becoming MP of Rajya Sabha he changed his demand.

== Entry into electoral politics ==
Rai was nominated by the Bharatiya Janata Party as its candidate for the Rajya Sabha election in 2023.

== See also ==
- Gorkhaland movement
