= Progression =

Progression may refer to:

In mathematics:

- Arithmetic progression, a sequence of numbers such that the difference between any two successive members of the sequence is a constant
- Geometric progression, a sequence of numbers such that the quotient of any two successive members of the sequence is a constant
- Harmonic progression (mathematics), a sequence of numbers such that their reciprocals form an arithmetic progression

In music:

- Chord progression, series of chords played in order
  - Backdoor progression, the cadential chord progression from iv7 to I, or flat-VII7 to I in jazz music theory
  - Omnibus progression, sequence of chords which effectively divides the octave into 4 equal parts
  - Ragtime progression, chord progression typical of ragtime music and parlour music genres
- Progression, Markus Schulz's second Artist Album, released in 2007

In other fields:

- Age progression, the process of modifying a photograph of a person to represent the effect of aging on their appearance
- Cisternal progression, theory of protein transport through the Golgi apparatus inside a cell
- Color progression, ranges of color whose values transition smoothly through a hue, saturation, luminance, or any combination of the three
- Horizontal progression, the gradual movement from left to right during writing a line of text in Western handwriting
- A progressive tax is a tax by which the tax rate increases as the taxable amount increases
- Semantic progression, evolution of word usage
- Educational progression, an individual's movement through stages of education and/or training
- Progress tracking in video games
- Astrological progression, used in Horoscopic astrology to forecast future trends and developments.
- Progression, a rhetorical device involving repeated antithesis

== See also ==
- Progress (disambiguation)
- Progressio (disambiguation)
