= Uttar Mandabari =

- Village
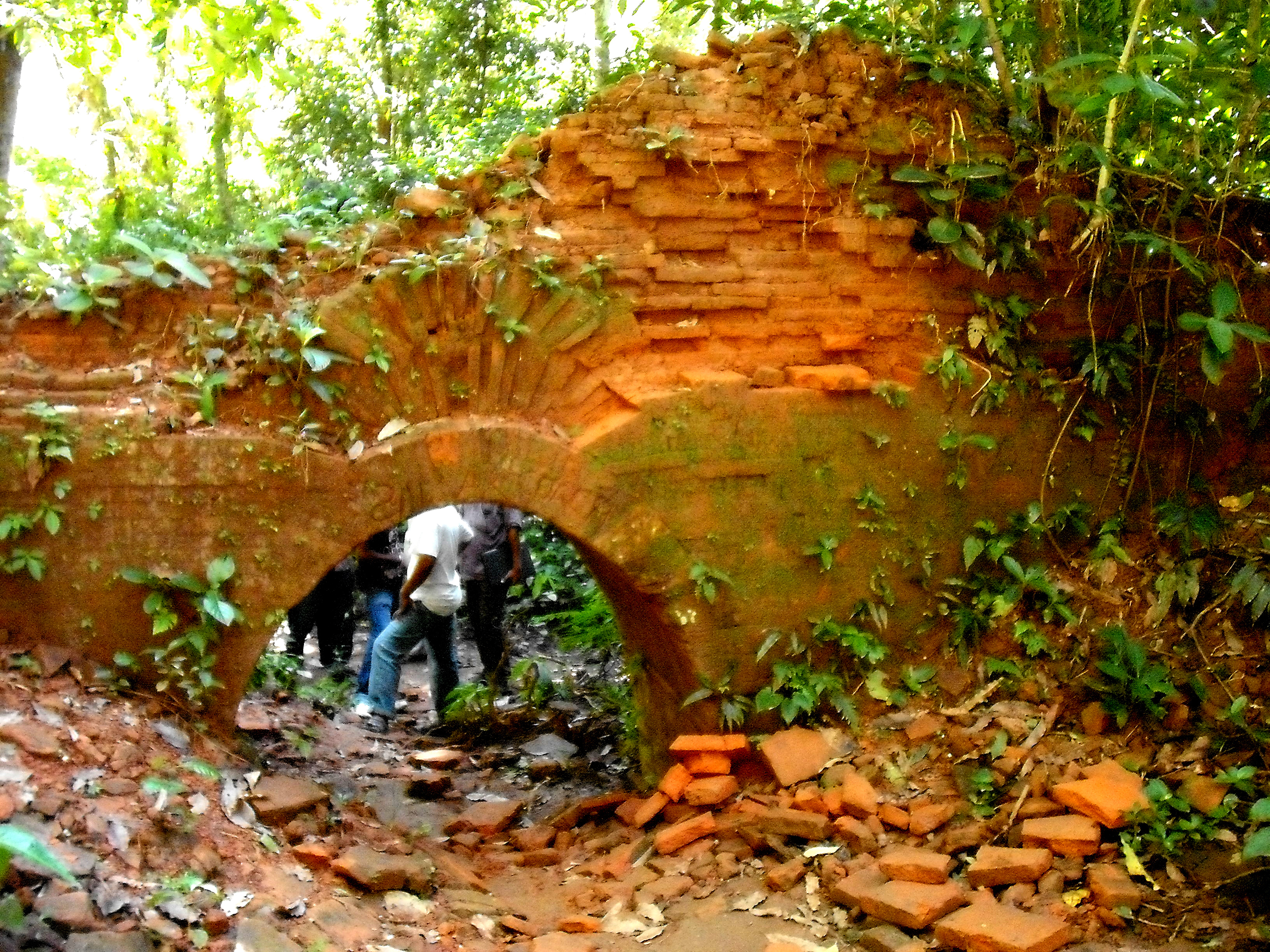
- The remains of Naranarayan Garh, previously known as the Nal Rajar Garh

- Location in West Bengal, India Uttar Mandabari (India)
- Coordinates: 26.625778°N 89.409967°E
- Country: India
- State: West Bengal
- District: Alipurduar

Population (2011)
  - Total: 6,932
- Time zone: UTC+5:30 (IST)
- PIN: 735214
- Telephone/STD code: 03566
- Vehicle registration: WB
- Lok Sabha constituency: Alipurduars
- Vidhan Sabha constituency: Kalchini
- Website: alipurduar.gov.in

Uttar Mandabari (also spelled Mendabari) is a village and a gram panchayat in the Kalchini CD block in the Alipurduar subdivision of the Alipurduar district in the state of West Bengal, India.

== Geography ==
Places and tea estates in the eastern portion of Alipurdar subdivision (including Kalchini, Kumargram and Alipuduar II CD blocks) in Alipurduar district
CT: census town, R: rural/ urban centre, N: neighbourhood, A: Air Force Station, NP: national park/ wildlife sanctuary, TE: tea estate, H: historical site
Abbreviations used in names – TG for Tea Garden (town/village), TE for Tea Estate
Owing to space constraints in the small map, the actual locations in a larger map may vary slightly

=== Location ===
Uttar Mandabari is located at 26.625778°N 89.409967°E.

=== Area overview ===
Alipurduar district is covered by two maps. It is an extensive area in the eastern end of the Dooars in West Bengal. It is undulating country, largely forested, with numerous rivers flowing down from the outer ranges of the Himalayas in Bhutan. It is a predominantly rural area with 79.38% of the population living in the rural areas. The district has 1 municipal town and 20 census towns and that means that 20.62% of the population lives in the urban areas. The scheduled castes and scheduled tribes, taken together, form more than half the population in all the six community development blocks in the district. There is a high concentration of tribal people (scheduled tribes) in the three northern blocks of the district.

Note: The map alongside presents some of the notable locations in the subdivision. All places marked in the map are linked in the larger full screen map.

== Demographics ==
As per the 2011 Census of India, Uttar Mandabari had a total population of 3,481. There were 1,729 (50%) males and 1,752 (50%) females. There were 386 persons in the age range of 0 to 6 years. The total number of literate people in Uttar Mandarbari was 1,987 (64.20% of the population over 6 years).

== Historical site ==
Naranarayan Garh is a historical site located on the banks of Bania River in the Chilapata Forests. It was built by Nara Narayan, king of Koch dynasty in the 16th century. The State Directorate of Archaeology previously placed it in the age of the Gupta Empire. But in 2025, the West Bengal State Heritage Commission confirmed that the fort was made by Nara Narayan and hence, has been renamed as the Naranarayan Garh.

== Tourism ==
Mendabari Jungle Camp is located nearby.
