= Progressive Coalition =

Progressive Coalition may refer to the following political parties:

- Jim Anderton's Progressive Party, in New Zealand, formerly Progressive Coalition and Jim Anderton's Progressive Coalition
- Vermont Progressive Party, in the United States, formerly the Progressive Coalition

== See also ==
- Progressive Party (disambiguation)
