= 2002 Australian Grand Prix =

681st Formula 1 Championship Grand Prix

Coordinates: 37°50′59″S 144°58′06″E

Race 1 of 17 in the 2002 Formula One World Championship
← Previous race	Next race →

Race details
- Date: 3 March 2002
- Official name: 2002 Foster's Australian Grand Prix
- Location: Albert Park Circuit, Albert Park, Melbourne, Victoria, Australia
- Course: Temporary street circuit
- Course length: 5.303 km (3.295 miles)
- Distance: 58 laps, 307.574 km (191.118 miles)
- Weather: Cloudy at start, clearing to sunny skies.
- Attendance: 127,000

Pole position
Driver	(Brazil) Rubens Barrichello	Ferrari
- Time: 1:25.843

Fastest lap
Driver	(Finland) Kimi Räikkönen	McLaren-Mercedes
- Time: 1:28.541 on lap 37

Podium
First	(Germany) Michael Schumacher	Ferrari
Second	(Colombia) Juan Pablo Montoya	Williams-BMW
Third	(Finland) Kimi Räikkönen	McLaren-Mercedes

The 2002 Australian Grand Prix (formally the 2002 Foster's Australian Grand Prix) was a Formula One motor race contested on 3 March 2002 at the Albert Park Circuit, Albert Park, Melbourne, Victoria, Australia. The race, which drew 127,000 spectators, was the first of the 2002 Formula One World Championship and the 18th Formula One Australian Grand Prix. Ferrari's Michael Schumacher won the 58-lap race after starting second. Williams' Juan Pablo Montoya finished second, and McLaren's Kimi Räikkönen took third, his maiden podium finish.

Ferrari's Rubens Barrichello took pole position after setting the best qualifying lap. He retired at the start of the race after braking too early for the first corner, catching Williams driver Ralf Schumacher, who collided with the rear of Barrichello's car. Six drivers were involved in a separate incident. The safety car was deployed for four laps to clear the track. McLaren's David Coulthard led the first ten laps before a mistake on lap eleven allowed Michael Schumacher to pass him. Montoya then passed Schumacher for first place on lap twelve. He maintained the lead until he ran wide and Michael Schumacher passed him to retake it. He led the rest of the race to claim his 54th career victory.

Following this, the season's opening round, Michael Schumacher left Australia leading the World Drivers' Championship with ten championship points. Montoya was four championship points behind in second with Räikkönen third. With sixteen races left in the season, Ferrari led the World Constructors' Championship from Williams and McLaren.

== Background ==
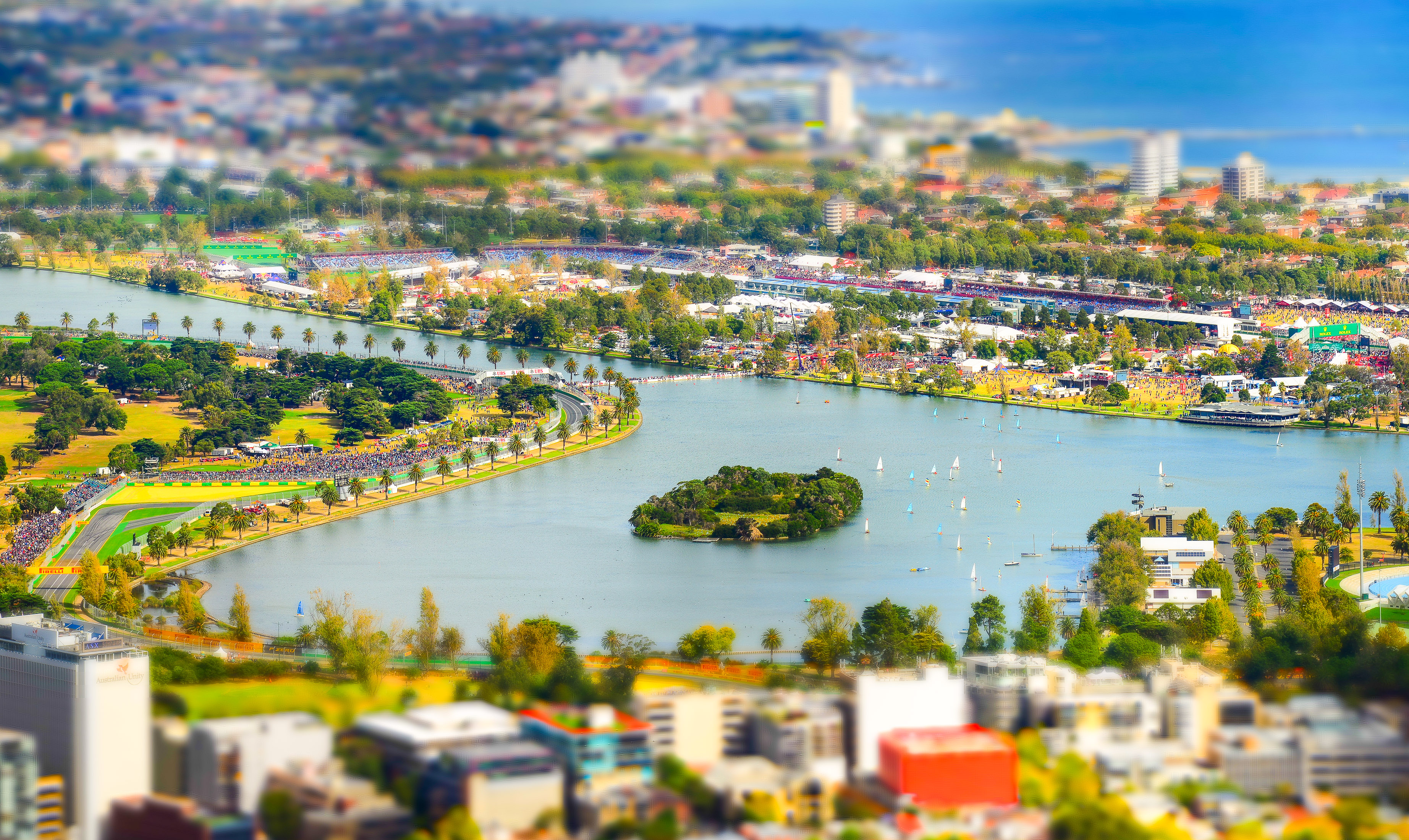
The Albert Park Circuit (pictured in 2014), where the race was held.

The event's planning began in January 2002. Due to the death of marshal Graham Beveridge in an accident in the 2001 race, it was only on the 2002 Formula One World Championship's provisional calendar. Formula One's governing body, the Fédération Internationale de l'Automobile (FIA), later confirmed it would be held following the publication of a coroner's report ruling Beveridge's death "avoidable". It was the first of 17 races of 2002 and the 18th Formula One World Championship Australian race. It occurred at the 5.303 km (3.295 mi) Albert Park Circuit in the Melbourne suburb of Albert Park in Victoria on 3 March. To improve safety, the height of the safety fences was raised to 3.8 m (12 ft), cages to safeguard race officials were installed and the size of access openings reduced.

Several teams retained their 2001 lineups for the 2002 season, while others changed drivers. The Benetton team was renamed Renault, ending its 16-year involvement in Formula One, and Toyota debuted with drivers Allan McNish and Mika Salo after the Japanese car maker spent 2001 developing the TF102. Having been in administration since November 2001, the Prost team was liquidated by the French courts in January 2002 after failing to find funding from sponsors or a buyer. The double world champion Mika Häkkinen took a sabbatical and fellow Finn Kimi Räikkönen replaced him at McLaren, whose Sauber car was driven by Felipe Massa, the 2001 Euro Formula 3000 champion. At the Jordan team, the 2001 British Formula Three champion Takuma Sato paired with Giancarlo Fisichella, whom Jarno Trulli replaced at Renault. Former Prost driver Heinz-Harald Frentzen drove Jos Verstappen's Arrows car, and Fernando Alonso left Minardi to become Renault's test driver; he was replaced by International Formula 3000 competitor Mark Webber.

At the front of the field, the press and bookmakers tipped Ferrari's Michael Schumacher to win his fifth World Drivers' Championship, with Williams's Juan Pablo Montoya as his main rival. Schumacher stated that his goal for the season was to win the championship and tie Juan Manuel Fangio's all-time record of five titles, "Our motivation is still unchanged, our target and goals are still the same. We want to once again win both world championships and there is nothing nicer than winning with Ferrari." Montoya stated that he felt more relaxed than in 2001 since he knew his team better, "I think I showed everyone out there that I am competitive and that's the important thing. It was a lot harder to win in Formula One than in CART because it took longer to understand the car, but now that's done I'm looking to do better in 2002." Former driver Derek Warwick believed Michael Schumacher was the best driver in Formula One and suspected Montoya lacked emotional maturity.

Due to performance and reliability issues, Ferrari brought the F2001B to Australia instead of the F2002 with the aim of Ferrari to score championship points in the opening races. According to Ferrari team principal Jean Todt, the F2002 was fast in pre-season testing, but the team did not have enough time to ensure that it would be reliable in Australia, "We think it will be able to bring home valuable points for the championship. Next week, we will continue our on-track development of the F2002, as well as fine-tuning the F2001 for the first race." Michelin did not bring a new tyre featuring asymmetrical grooves that sloped more gradually on one side than the other to Australia so that all of their teams could avoid disqualification from the event after Bridgestone and the FIA protested the legality of the compounds. During the first two practice sessions, the F2001 was fitted with a rear wing used on the F2002 in testing; both Michael Schumacher and his teammate Rubens Barrichello opted for one seen at the 2001 Japanese Grand Prix. The McLaren MP4-17 car had an attachment to its lower front suspension frame split to promote airflow beneath the front wing, as well as altered ailerons in the front and back. The Jordan, Arrows and Sauber teams copied the design.

== Practice ==
The race was preceded by four practice sessions, two one-hour sessions on Friday and two 45-minute sessions on Saturday. The first session, which was held in changing weather, resulted in the fastest times late on. Michael Schumacher lapped fastest at 1:28.804, 0.363 seconds faster than his teammate Barrichello in second. Fisichella, Ralf Schumacher, Massa, the Jaguar duo of Pedro de la Rosa and Eddie Irvine, Frentzen, Salo and Renault's Jenson Button followed in third through tenth.

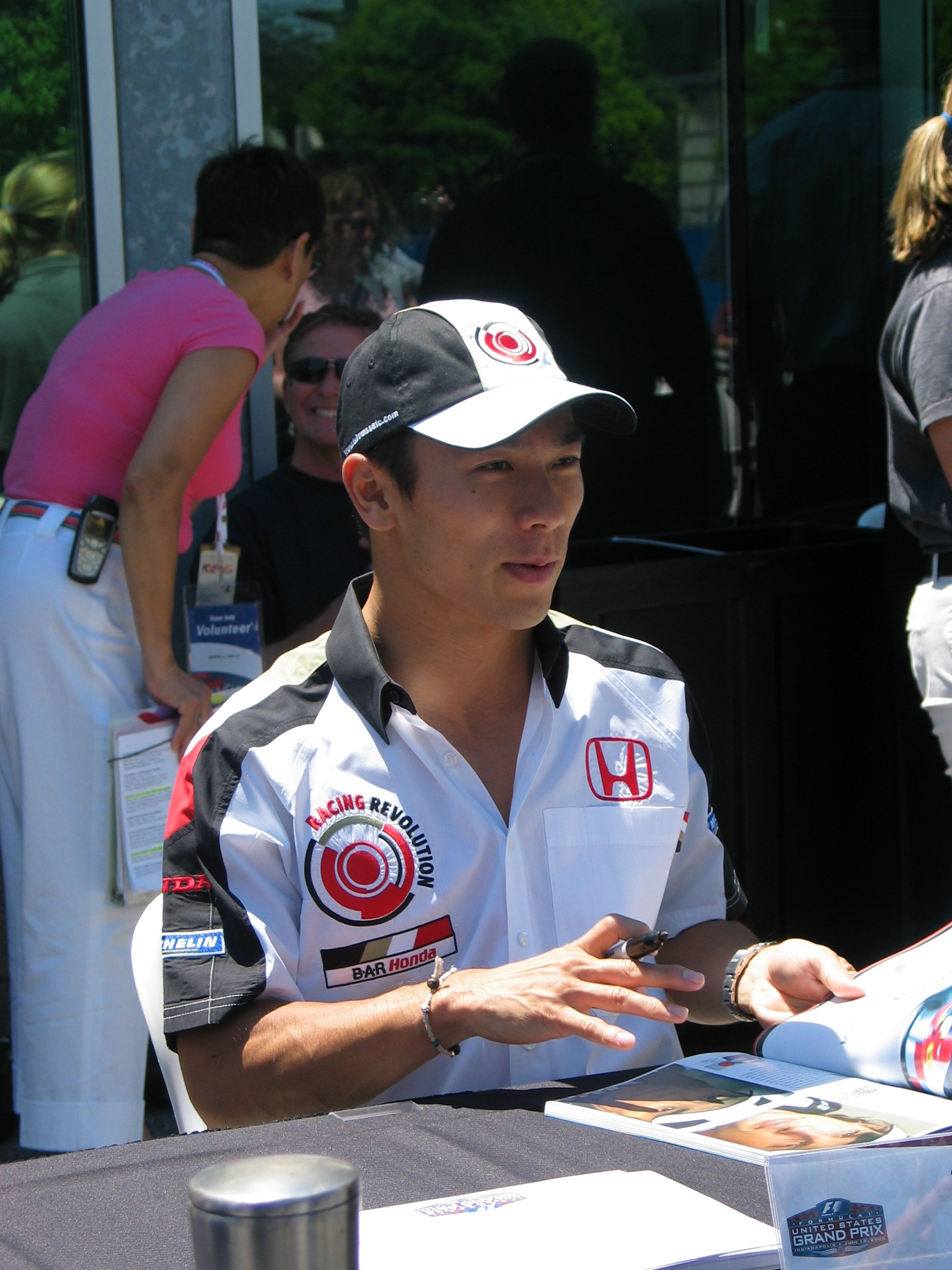
Takuma Sato (pictured in 2005) crashed in the third practice session and drove the spare Jordan EJ12 car for qualifying.

Michael Schumacher set the day's fastest lap of 1:27.276 in the second session. His teammate Barrichello was 0.523 seconds slower in second. The two Williams cars of Ralf Schumacher and Montoya, Sauber's Nick Heidfeld, Salo, Räikkönen, Massa, Fisichella and Trulli were in positions three to ten. During the session, Enrique Bernoldi stopped his Arrows A23 car with a broken gearbox. Barrichello spun through 360 degrees across the grass and reemerged onto the circuit soon after. Montoya braked too late and returned to the track via an escape road and a gravel trap. A short light rain shower made the circuit slippery and caught out Alex Yoong; he beached his Minardi car in the turn one gravel trap. An engine failure ended Fisichella's session early and his teammate Sato ran across a gravel trap.

The weather for the third session was cool, damp and overcast. Michael Schumacher's updated unofficial lap record of 1:26.177 maintained Ferrari's lead. Barrichello was 0.321 seconds slower in second. McLaren's Coulthard and Räikkönen, Williams' Ralf Schumacher and Montoya, British American Racing (BAR) driver Olivier Panis, Sauber teammates Heidfeld and Massa along with Trulli followed in the top ten. Sato lost control of his Jordan EJ12 car's rear on the entry to Stewart turn with 13 minutes and 34 seconds remaining and crashed into the left-hand side tyre barrier at 160 km/h (99 mph). Sato was unhurt; practice was stopped for nine minutes to allow marshals to clean the track. Since spare cars could not be used in free practice, Sato missed the fourth session since his car required repairs.

A brief rain shower saturated the racetrack during the fourth session, preventing lap times from improving as some drivers drove off the track.Hence, no driver bettered Michael Schumacher's fastest time, as Barrichello in second halved the gap to his teammate. The Williams duo of Montoya and Ralf Schumacher improved to third and fourth and the McLaren pair of Coulthard and Räikkönen fell to fifth and sixth. Heidfeld, the BAR duo of Jacques Villeneuve and Panis and Fisichella were seventh to tenth.

== Qualifying ==
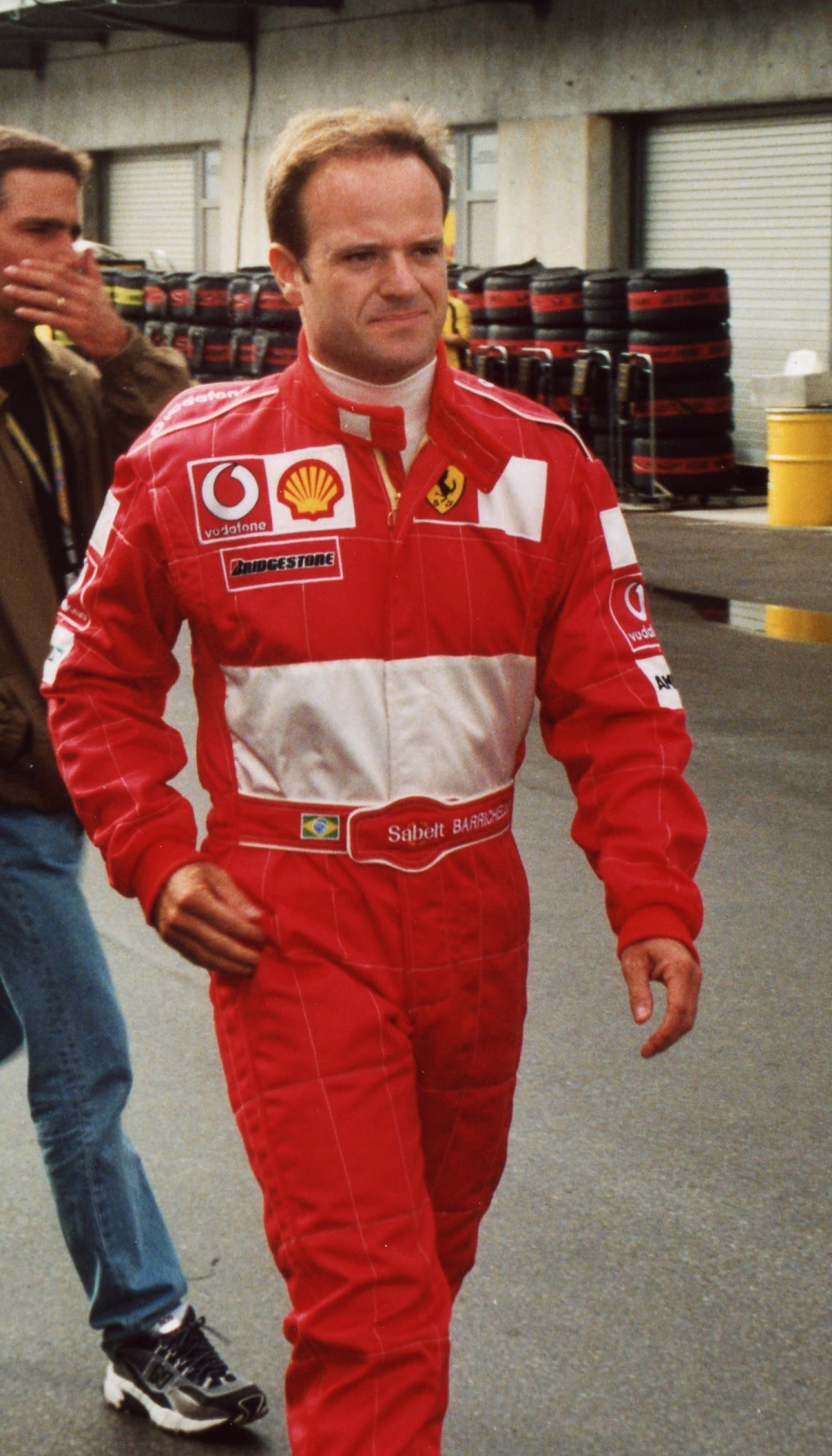
Rubens Barrichello took the fourth pole position of his career.

During Saturday's one-hour qualifying session, each racer was limited to twelve laps, with the starting position set by their fastest laps. The 107% rule was in force during this session, requiring each driver to achieve a time within 107% of the fastest lap to qualify for the race. The session began on a dry track until a heavy rainstorm fell halfway through, making the circuit slippery and prevented any improvement in lap time. Barrichello completed two laps before it rained (the first was compromised by slower traffic); he took the fourth career pole position and his first since the 2000 British Grand Prix with a time of 1:25.843. He was joined on the grid's front row by Michael Schumacher, who made an error on a kerb in the first sector. Third-placed Ralf Schumacher stayed in the garage for the opening three minutes to avoid slower traffic. Fourth-placed Coulthard attempted to pass an unsighted Villeneuve on the outside of the final turn, but they collided. Coulthard's right-rear wheel hit the wall and he spun onto a run-off area. An error put his teammate Räikkönen fifth. Montoya in sixth lost six-tenths of a second after Fisichella slowed his first timed lap. Trulli in seventh was slowed by a Jaguar car on his first lap. Fisichella in eighth expressed satisfaction with his car's balance and performance. Massa was the highest-placed rookie in ninth after two errors. His teammate Heidfeld qualified tenth.

Button was the fastest driver who did not qualify in the top ten after being fourth early on. Panis completed one timed lap as he could not extract more performance from his BAR 004 and took 12th. Excess oversteer slowed his teammate Villeneuve in 13th. Salo, 14th, drove cautiously on his first timed lap. A minor fuel pressure fault limited Frentzen in 15th to one untroubled lap. McNish, 16th, had a set of tyres deducted from his qualifying allocation because Toyota erroneously used one set designated for Friday's practice sessions on Saturday. A stoppage caught out Bernoldi at the start of his first timed lap and he qualified 17th. Webber took 18th and used wet-weather tyres. The two Jaguar R3 cars had a major aerodynamic deficiency and were 19th and 20th: A rear brake balance slowed Irvine and a handling deficiency saw De la Rosa drive the spare Jaguar. Yoong completed one timed lap for 21st. Five minutes in Sato's spare Jordan EJ12 car stopped before Stewart turn with a hydraulic clutch problem that automatically selected third gear. The session was stopped for eight minutes to allow marshals to move his car. Sato returned to his garage and drove Fisichella's race car but the rain made him more than 107 per cent slower than Barrichello.

=== Post-qualifying ===
Following qualifying, Jordan team principal and owner Eddie Jordan appealed to the stewards to allow Sato to run because he was under the 107 percent limit during free practice. They allowed him to race under "exceptional circumstances," as in prior cases affected by changing weather.

=== Qualifying classification ===
Pos	No.	Driver	Constructor	Time	Gap	Grid
1	2	(Brazil) Rubens Barrichello	Ferrari	1:25.843	—	1
2	1	(Germany) Michael Schumacher	Ferrari	1:25.848	+0.005	2
3	5	(Germany) Ralf Schumacher	Williams-BMW	1:26.279	+0.436	3
4	3	(United Kingdom) David Coulthard	McLaren-Mercedes	1:26.446	+0.603	4
5	4	(Finland) Kimi Räikkönen	McLaren-Mercedes	1:27.161	+1.318	5
6	6	(Colombia) Juan Pablo Montoya	Williams-BMW	1:27.249	+1.406	6
7	14	(Italy) Jarno Trulli	Renault	1:27.710	+1.867	7
8	9	(Italy) Giancarlo Fisichella	Jordan-Honda	1:27.869	+2.026	8
9	8	(Brazil) Felipe Massa	Sauber-Petronas	1:27.972	+2.129	9
10	7	(Germany) Nick Heidfeld	Sauber-Petronas	1:28.232	+2.389	10
11	15	(United Kingdom) Jenson Button	Renault	1:28.361	+2.518	11
12	12	(France) Olivier Panis	BAR-Honda	1:28.381	+2.538	12
13	11	(Canada) Jacques Villeneuve	BAR-Honda	1:28.657	+2.814	13
14	24	(Finland) Mika Salo	Toyota	1:29.205	+3.362	14
15	20	(Germany) Heinz-Harald Frentzen	Arrows-Cosworth	1:29.474	+3.631	15
16	25	(United Kingdom) Allan McNish	Toyota	1:29.636	+3.793	16
17	21	(Brazil) Enrique Bernoldi	Arrows-Cosworth	1:29.738	+3.895	17
18	23	(Australia) Mark Webber	Minardi-Asiatech	1:30.086	+4.243	18
19	16	(United Kingdom) Eddie Irvine	Jaguar-Cosworth	1:30.113	+4.270	19
20	17	(Spain) Pedro de la Rosa	Jaguar-Cosworth	1:30.192	+4.349	20
21	22	(Malaysia) Alex Yoong	Minardi-Asiatech	1:31.504	+5.661	21
107% time: 1:31.852
22	10	(Japan) Takuma Sato	Jordan-Honda	1:53.351	+27.508^{1}	22

Notes

- ^1 – Takuma Sato set a time 107% slower than the fastest qualifying lap. He was granted permission from the stewards to start the race due to "exceptional circumstances".

== Warm-up ==
A half-hour warm-up session was held on Sunday morning in variable weather as heavy rain fell before it began. Teams used rain tyres and set-up their cars against the weather of the time. With a lap of 1:41.509, Michael Schumacher was fastest with teammate Barrichello 1.382 seconds slower in second. Coulthard, Ralf Schumacher, Montoya, Massa, Heidfeld, Fisichella, Trulli and Irvine made up positions three to ten. With 40 seconds to go, Salo drove off the racing line to allow Barrichello past into Ascari corner. He drove onto a white painted line, lost control of his Toyota and crashed into the barrier; Salo's front wing detached heading towards an escape road.

== Race ==
The weather at the start was dry and overcast with the air temperature between 15 and 18 °C (59 and 64 °F) and the track temperature from 20 to 23 °C (68 to 73 °F). Sato drove the spare Jordan EJ12 car set up for his teammate Fisichella; after warm-up Jordan fixed an electrical problem that rendered its clutch inoperable. Before the race commenced at 14:00 local time before a crowd of 127,000 for 58 laps over a distance of 307.594 km (191.130 mi), Frentzen and Bernoldi stalled their stationary cars; marshals and mechanics extricated them to the pit lane.

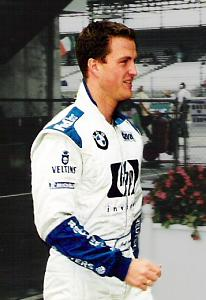
Ralf Schumacher made contact with the rear of Barrichello's car and retired with heavy car damage at the start of the race.

Ralf Schumacher used the outside grip to pass Michael Schumacher for second place and challenge Barrichello's heavily fuelled Ferrari for the lead. As Michael Schumacher turned left to get the greatest possible approach into Brabham Corner, his teammate Barrichello switched lanes twice to try to prevent Ralf Schumacher, who responded by going to the centre in between the two Ferraris in anticipation that momentum would give him the lead. Barrichello braked early for Brabham turn, catching out Ralf Schumacher in the braking area, who struck the rear of Barrichello's car at about 240 km/h (150 mph). He launched over the Ferrari with all four wheels off the racing surface, grazed Barrichello's helmet, careened 100 m (330 ft) and rested against the tyre wall in the run-off area upright. When Barrichello's back wing was removed, his car spun broadside to a halt, causing an eight-car accident. His teammate Michael Schumacher and Räikkönen drove onto the grass to avoid a collision, as Massa cut the inside of the corner, and speared into Fisichella, the momentum collected Massa's teammate Heidfeld and further causing Button, Panis and McNish to get caught up in the incident. Villeneuve, Salo, Webber, Irvine, De la Rosa, Yoong and Sato weaved through the crash scene. Barrichello and Ralf Schumacher were unhurt, and oil was laid on the track between turns one and three.

The drivers involved in the incident returned to the pit lane, anticipating that the race would be stopped and that they could drive their spare cars for a restart. However, the FIA race director, Charlie Whiting, did not stop the race and order a restart. He deployed the safety car to pick up the remaining 12 runners with the damaged cars moved and debris cleared with the eight cars retiring from the race. This left Coulthard in the lead, followed by Trulli, Montoya, Michael Schumacher, Irvine and De la Rosa. At lap two's conclusion, Räikkönen entered the pit lane for a 48-second pit stop for a new front wing and to remove debris lodged behind his back. Webber's differential and traction control began to malfunction on lap three. On the same lap, Frentzen ignored a red light instructing drivers to stay in the pit lane until further notice and entered the circuit. The safety car was withdrawn when lap five ended and Coulthard led Trulli and Montoya. Going into Whiteford turn, Montoya drew close to Trulli and slid wide on oil laid on the circuit. This meant Michael Schumacher overtook Montoya for third. Further back, Räikkönen moved from eleventh to ninth.

Coulthard began to pull away from the rest of the field, increasing his lead to 4.5 seconds by lap seven. That same lap, Sato overtook De la Rosa for sixth, as Webber lost seventh to Räikkönen. At the back, Bernoldi rejoined the race after switching from his race car to the spare Arrows entry. Trulli blocked Michael Schumacher from passing him for second into Brabham corner on the eighth lap, allowing Montoya to gain on Schumacher; he was not close enough to affect a pass. There were overtakes further down the field: Räikkönen passed De la Rosa and Sato as Villeneuve overtook Webber for ninth. Trulli lost control of his Renault's rear on oil at the exit of Jones turn on lap nine, breaking his suspension in a collision with the inside barrier. Because Trulli was stopped on the centre of the track, the safety car was deployed for the second time to allow marshals to move his car and clean the circuit. When the safety car was withdrawn at the end of the 11th lap, an gearbox electrical fault distracted Coulthard, causing him to miss a gear change, lock his brakes, and understeer wide onto the grass entering Prost turn. He fell to fifth.

Michael Schumacher took the lead with Montoya second and Irvine third. Approaching Brabham corner Montoya's higher straightline speed moved him past Michael Schumacher on the outside at the end of the main straight for the lead. Montoya then steered onto the inside to maintain the lead from Schumacher at Jones corner. Once he generated temperature into his tyres, Michael Schumacher had closed to within 0.8 seconds of passing Montoya by lap 13, but was unable to do so owing to slower traffic. Sato retired on lap 14 due to an unresolvable electronics issue that limited his gear selection. Michael Schumacher continued to pressure Montoya into an error, causing him to drive onto oil at Brabham Corner. He overtook Montoya on the inside as they exited Jones turn to take the lead to begin lap 17. Michael Schumacher began to pull away from the rest of the field as Montoya struggled to generate heat in his tyres. On lap 18, De la Rosa fell to eighth after Yoong, Webber and Villeneuve overtook him. On the following lap Frentzen was disqualified for his earlier transgression of ignoring the red light at the pit lane exit.

By lap 22 Michael Schumacher's advantage over Montoya had grown to 11.3 seconds, with consecutive lap times in the 1:29 range. Räikkönen was 0.8 seconds behind Montoya. On the same lap, Coulthard went off the track at Prost corner. His slower speed promoted Irvine to fourth soon after. Bernoldi was disqualified from the race on lap 23 because the stewards determined he switched to the spare car after the race began. Webber and Villeneuve passed Coulthard for fifth and sixth on laps 25 and 26. Villeneuve in sixth had a rear wing failure, sending him into the tyre wall at high speed on the entry to Waite corner and retirement from his 100th race entry on lap 28. He was unhurt. On lap 29, Yoong overtook Coulthard for sixth. Seven laps later, Coulthard became the race's final retirement when he pulled off to the side of track at Whiteford corner because his McLaren was stuck in sixth gear.

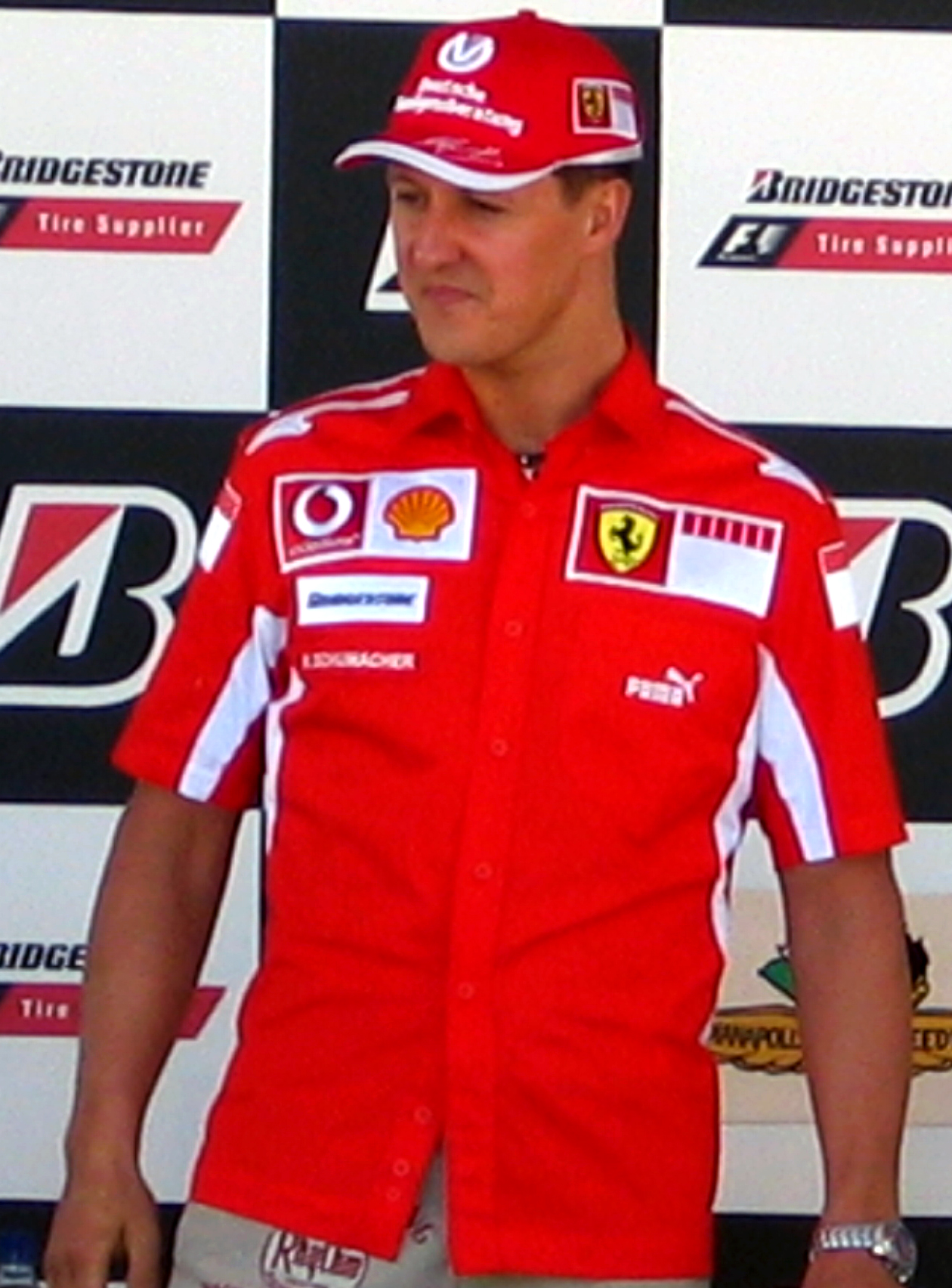
Michael Schumacher (pictured in 2005) took his third win at the Australian Grand Prix and the 54th of his career.

Webber was the first of the top six drivers to make a pit stop on lap 37. He had a problematic 34.9-second pit stop; the Minardi's fuel cover did not open automatically and a mechanic used a screwdriver to unsecure it. Webber rejoined the track in sixth. Montoya and Michael Schumacher made their pit stops on laps 37 and 38. In the meantime, Räikkönen set the race's fastest lap of 1:25.841 seconds on lap 37, as he sought to pass Montoya for second after his pit stop. He made his stop on lap 38. As Räikkönen drove onto the track, he drew alongside Montoya and carried excess speed into Brabham corner. He understeered wide onto the grass as he regained control of the rear of his car and fell to third, behind Montoya.

With the first four positions settled, attention switched to the battle for fifth between Webber and Salo. Webber short-shifted to avoid unnecessary car component stress when he noticed Salo closing up. He went faster and Minardi team owner Paul Stoddart radioed that he had to defend fifth from Salo, with Webber aware of a potential revenue bonus of $25 million for Minardi finishing ahead of Toyota in the World Constructors' Championship. Salo had seen the gap between himself and Webber close by 20 seconds in ten laps and had closed it by the 57th lap. He attempted to pass Webber on the outside; Salo spun through 180 degrees on radiator coolant from Button's car at Whiteford due to aerodynamic turbulence generated by airflow over Webber's car and the latter's block. He was able to restart his car and continue in sixth.

Michael Schumacher led the final 39 laps to take the 54th victory of his career en route to his fifth World Drivers' Championship. Montoya followed 18.628 seconds later in second. He was a further 6.4 seconds ahead of Räikkönen, who finished third for his first podium finish of his career. Irvine and Webber finished fourth and fifth after starting from 19th and 18th respectively. Salo took the final point in sixth place, the first time a team scored points in its debut race since JJ Lehto was fifth for Sauber at the 1993 South African Grand Prix. Yoong came a career-best seventh; he had a "long" brake pedal and a car optimised for wet-weather, and marshals mistakenly waved blue flags at Yoong because they did not know which lap he was on. De la Rosa was the final classified finisher following a lengthy pit stop due to a misfiring engine. The attrition rate was high, with 8 of the 22 starters finishing the race.

=== Post-race ===
The top three drivers appeared on the podium to collect their trophies and spoke to the media in a later press conference. Michael Schumacher called his battle with Montoya "an interesting one" and "a bit back and forward", adding "I think as well that the tyres played a little bit of a role in that; initially I struggled to get the temperature in where these guys seemed to get faster on top of temperatures but then it went the other way around, their tyres went off and my one came in so I had a nice chance to battle a little bit and finally got first position for us, which was ideal." Montoya said he enjoyed the battle and stated Ferrari had the fastest car, "I think the conditions were not the best for the tyres. Hopefully in Malaysia it is going to be hotter, it could play into our hands a little bit." Räikkönen expressed astonishment at finishing third and mentioned how easy it was to overtake other cars, "Some cars was more difficult and then it was helping me a lot big time because the safety car came out second time and I got behind the leaders and that was the main reason that I catch them, but it was quite a difficult and interesting race."

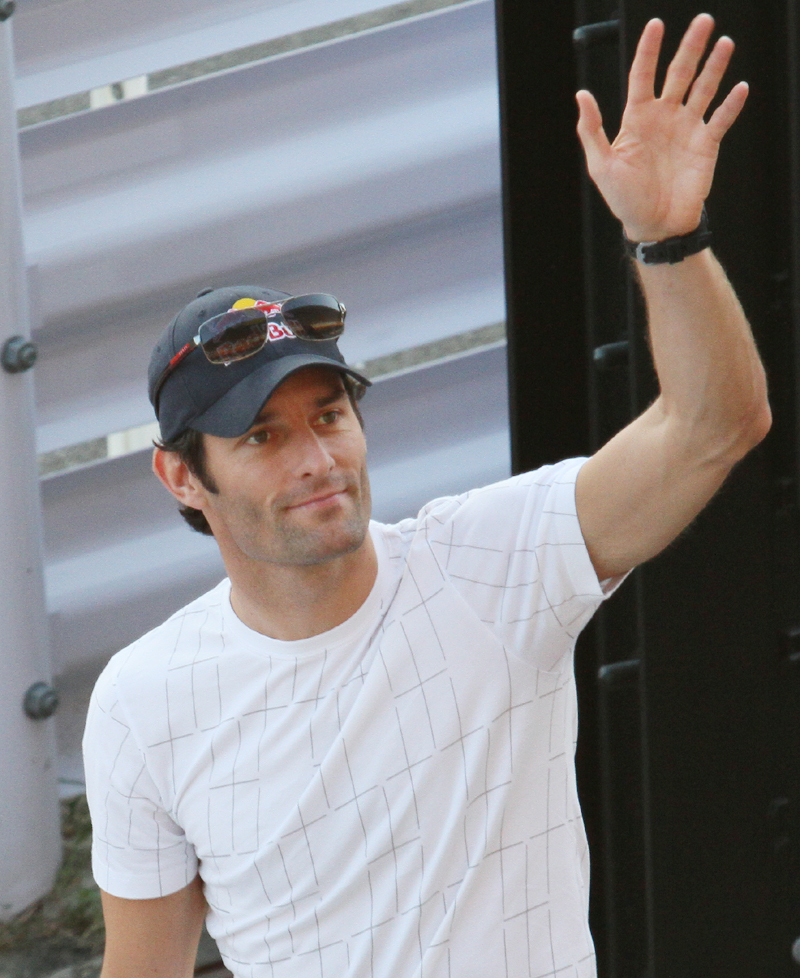
Mark Webber (pictured in 2010) finished fifth and was given an impromptu podium ceremony after the race.

The Australian Grand Prix Corporation's chairman, Ron Walker, convinced Webber and Stoddart to celebrate their fifth-place finish with an impromptu ceremony on the podium in front of the crowd, which resulted in a £50,000 fine from FIA president Max Mosley. In a retrospective interview for The Weekend Australian in 2012, Stoddart called Webber's fifth-place finish "the most exciting two points in the history of Formula One". Webber commented on the result, "Finishing the race fifth was unbelievable. We had people scaling catch fencing. Occupational health and safety would have gone ballistic these days. It was a unique day." The result saw Webber's three-race contract with Minardi extended to the end of the season. The media compared Webber's achievement to ice skater Steven Bradbury winning a gold medal in the men's 1000 metres short track speed skating at the 2002 Winter Olympics; both men were successful after several participants crashed in their respective events.

Following their third collision in the previous two seasons, Barrichello and Ralf Schumacher were summoned to the stewards, who studied post-race television footage. Neither driver received a penalty and were given a warning. The stewards classed the crash as "a racing incident", with neither competitor to blame. Mosley said he considered the matter with Whiting but the two took it no further, deciding it was "marginal". Michael Schumacher argued Barrichello braked earlier than normal, saying "I was afraid to turn into the first corner because I suddenly saw cars flying next to me. I decided to go straight on and have a nice ride through the grass, which was a good decision, otherwise I guess I would have been hit." Barrichello said he was not to blame for the accident, "If he wanted to overtake on the outside, he should have moved a lot further. I didn't get in his way." Jackie Stewart, the three-time world champion, argued Ralf Schumacher had misjudged the braking distance for turn one, while Coulthard believed Barrichello caused the accident by braking earlier than usual. Button and Fisichella blamed Heidfeld for causing the second accident further down the field on the first lap. Heidfeld said he believed he did cause the crash.

Whiting's decision not to stop the race after the eight-car crash was criticised. Jordan technical director Gary Anderson called it "the most absurd thing I've seen in my life". Fisichella believed not stopping the race was "ridiculous", and Michael Schumacher agreed it should have been stopped. Coulthard defended the decision, saying "I've always felt that to deprive the spectators of a number of cars as a result of an incident at the first corner isn't really good for the business. But this isn't Hollywood. You don't cut out the bits you don't like. This is real. This is racing." Ralf Schumacher also backed Whiting's ruling, noting "Charlie Whiting took the right decision by not stopping the race. He had made it quite clear to us that he would not stop a race unless it was for safety reasons and that wasn't the case."

Because this was the first race of the season, Michael Schumacher led the World Drivers' Championship with ten championship points. Montoya was second with six championship points and Räikkönen was third with four. Irvine was fourth with three championship points and Webber was fifth with two championship points. Ferrari took the lead of the World Constructors' Championship with ten championship points. Williams were second with six championship points and McLaren followed in third with four championship points. With three championship points, Jaguar were fourth and Minardi fifth with two championship points with sixteen races left in the season.

=== Race classification ===
Drivers who scored championship points are denoted in bold.

Pos	No.	Driver	Constructor	Tyre	Laps	Time/Retired	Grid	Points
1	1	(Germany) **Michael Schumacher**	**Ferrari**	B	58	1:35:36.792	2	10
2	6	(Colombia) **Juan Pablo Montoya**	**Williams-BMW**	M	58	+18.628	6	6
3	4	(Finland) **Kimi Räikkönen**	**McLaren-Mercedes**	M	58	+25.067	5	4
4	16	(United Kingdom) **Eddie Irvine**	**Jaguar-Cosworth**	M	57	+1 Lap	19	3
5	23	(Australia) **Mark Webber**	**Minardi-Asiatech**	M	56	+2 Laps	18	2
6	24	(Finland) **Mika Salo**	**Toyota**	M	56	+2 Laps	14	1
7	22	(Malaysia) Alex Yoong	Minardi-Asiatech	M	55	+3 Laps	21	
8	17	(Spain) Pedro de la Rosa	Jaguar-Cosworth	M	53	+5 Laps	20	
Ret	3	(United Kingdom) David Coulthard	McLaren-Mercedes	M	33	Gearbox	4	
Ret	11	(Canada) Jacques Villeneuve	BAR-Honda	B	27	Broken wing	13	
Ret	10	(Japan) Takuma Sato	Jordan-Honda	B	12	Electrical	22	
Ret	14	(Italy) Jarno Trulli	Renault	M	8	Accident	7	
Ret	2	(Brazil) Rubens Barrichello	Ferrari	B	0	Collision	1	
Ret	5	(Germany) Ralf Schumacher	Williams-BMW	M	0	Collision	3	
Ret	9	(Italy) Giancarlo Fisichella	Jordan-Honda	B	0	Collision	8	
Ret	8	(Brazil) Felipe Massa	Sauber-Petronas	B	0	Collision	9	
Ret	7	(Germany) Nick Heidfeld	Sauber-Petronas	B	0	Collision	10	
Ret	15	(United Kingdom) Jenson Button	Renault	M	0	Collision	11	
Ret	12	(France) Olivier Panis	BAR-Honda	B	0	Collision	12	
Ret	25	(United Kingdom) Allan McNish	Toyota	M	0	Collision	16	
DSQ	20	(Germany) Heinz-Harald Frentzen	Arrows-Cosworth	B	16	Exited pits under red light^{3}	PL^{2}	
DSQ	21	(Brazil) Enrique Bernoldi	Arrows-Cosworth	B	15	Illegal car change^{3}	PL^{2}	

Notes

- **^2** – Heinz-Harald Frentzen and Enrique Bernoldi started the race from the pit lane.
- **^3** – Heinz-Harald Frentzen and Enrique Bernoldi were disqualified for passing the red light at the exit of the pit lane and changing to the team's spare car after the commencement of the formation lap, respectively.

== Championship standings after the race ==
Drivers' Championship standings

Pos	Driver	Points
1	(Germany) Michael Schumacher	10
2	(Colombia) Juan Pablo Montoya	6
3	(Finland) Kimi Räikkönen	4
4	(United Kingdom) Eddie Irvine	3
5	(Australia) Mark Webber	2

Constructors' Championship standings

Pos	Constructor	Points
1	(Italy) Ferrari	10
2	(United Kingdom) Williams-BMW	6
3	(United Kingdom) McLaren-Mercedes	4
4	(United Kingdom) Jaguar-Cosworth	3
5	(Italy) Minardi-Asiatech	2

- Note: Only the top five positions are included for both sets of standings.

Previous race: 2001 Japanese Grand Prix	FIA Formula One World Championship; 2002 season	Next race: 2002 Malaysian Grand Prix
Previous race: 2001 Australian Grand Prix	Australian Grand Prix	Next race: 2003 Australian Grand Prix
