= Proteolipid protein 1 =

Type of myelin-associated protein

PLP1
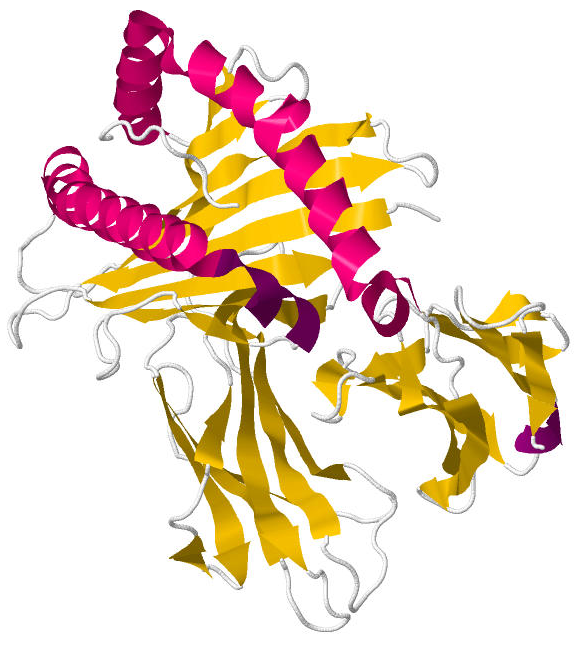
Available structures
PDB	Ortholog search: PDBe RCSB
PDB	List of PDB id codes 2XPG

Identifiers
- Aliases: PLP1, GPM6C, HLD1, MMPL, PLP, PLP/DM20, PMD, SPG2, proteolipid protein 1
- External IDs: OMIM: 300401; MGI: 97623; HomoloGene: 448; GeneCards: PLP1; OMA:PLP1 - orthologs

Gene location (Human)
Chr.	X chromosome (human)
Band	Xq22.2	Start	103,773,718 bp
Band	Xq22.2	End	103,792,619 bp

Gene location (Mouse)
Chr.	X chromosome (mouse)
Band	X F1|X 59.1 cM	Start	135,723,420 bp
Band	X F1|X 59.1 cM	End	135,740,482 bp
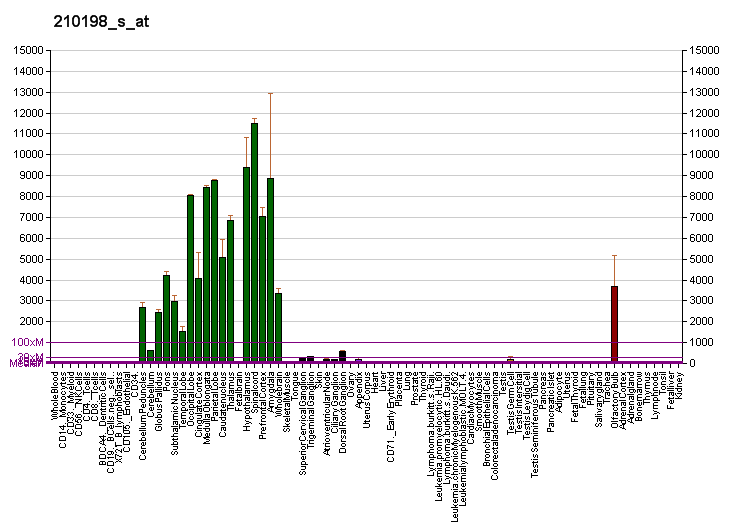
RNA expression pattern
Bgee	Human / Mouse (ortholog); Top expressed in: middle frontal gyrus; corpus callosum; inferior ganglion of vagus nerve; superior vestibular nucleus; pons; subthalamic nucleus; ventral tegmental area; spinal cord; C1 segment; pars reticulata / Top expressed in: globus pallidus; deep cerebellar nuclei; lateral geniculate nucleus; ventral tegmental area; pontine nuclei; lateral hypothalamus; dorsal tegmental nucleus; medial vestibular nucleus; medial geniculate nucleus; nucleus accumbens; More reference expression data
BioGPS	More reference expression data
Gene ontology
Molecular function	protein binding; structural constituent of myelin sheath; structural molecule activity; identical protein binding
Cellular component	integral component of membrane; myelin sheath; plasma membrane; membrane
Biological process	axon ensheathment; integrin-mediated signaling pathway; astrocyte development; myelination; axon development; positive regulation of gene expression; inflammatory response; glial cell differentiation; cell maturation; long-chain fatty acid biosynthetic process; substantia nigra development; central nervous system myelination; chemical synaptic transmission; neuron projection development
Sources:Amigo / QuickGO
Orthologs
Species	Human	Mouse
Entrez	5354	18823
Ensembl	ENSG00000123560	ENSMUSG00000031425
UniProt	P60201	P60202
RefSeq (mRNA)	NM_199478; NM_000533; NM_001128834; NM_001305004	NM_011123; NM_001290561; NM_001290562; NM_001359117; NM_001359118 NM_001359119; NM_001359120
RefSeq (protein)	NP_000524; NP_001122306; NP_001291933; NP_955772	NP_001277490; NP_035253; NP_001346046; NP_001346047; NP_001346048 NP_001346049
Location (UCSC)	Chr X: 103.77 – 103.79 Mb	Chr X: 135.72 – 135.74 Mb
PubMed search
- Wikidata
View/Edit Human	View/Edit Mouse

Proteolipid protein 1 (PLP1) is a form of myelin proteolipid protein (PLP). Mutations in PLP1 are associated with Pelizaeus–Merzbacher disease. It is a 4 transmembrane domain protein which is proposed to bind other copies of itself on the extracellular side of the membrane. In a myelin sheath, as the layers of myelin wraps come together, PLP will bind itself and tightly hold the cellular membranes together.

This gene encodes a transmembrane proteolipid protein that is the predominant myelin protein present in the central nervous system (CNS). The encoded protein functions in myelination. This protein may play a role in the compaction, stabilization, and maintenance of myelin sheaths, as well as in oligodendrocyte development and axonal survival. Mutations associated with this gene cause X-linked Pelizaeus–Merzbacher disease and spastic paraplegia type 2. Two transcript variants encoding distinct isoforms have been identified for this gene.

In melanocytic cells PLP1 gene expression may be regulated by MITF.

== Interactions ==
Proteolipid protein 1 has been shown to interact with Myelin basic protein.

== See also ==
- PLP2
