= Progressive Green Party =

Progressive Green Party may refer to:

- Groen (political party), Belgium, an independent Flemish progressive Green party
- Progressive Green Party (New Zealand), an environmentalist political party in New Zealand in the 1990s

== See also ==
- Progressive Party (disambiguation)
- Green Party (disambiguation)
- Progress Party (disambiguation)
