= Progressive Constitutionalist Party =

Progressive Constitutionalist Party may refer to:

- Progressive Constitutionalist Party (Malta)
- Progressive Constitutionalist Party (Mexico)
- Czech Constitutionalist Progressive Party, Austria-Hungary

== See also ==
- Progressive Party (disambiguation)
