= Kamtapur Liberation Organisation =

Militant group in India

- Flag of the Kamtapur Liberation Organisation
- Leaders: Jibon Singha (POW); Milton Burman (POW); Siddhart Adhikary (POW)
- Dates active: 1995–2025
- Allegiance: United National Liberation Front of Western South East Asia
- Active regions: Northeast India and West Bengal
- Ideology: Kamtapuri nationalism Separatism; Socialism
- Status: Inactive
- Wars: Insurgency in Northeast India

The Kamtapur Liberation Organisation (abbr. KLO) is a militant organisation based in Northeast India whose objective is to separate the Kamtapur nation from West Bengal and Assam. The proposed state is to comprise all districts of northern West Bengal which are Cooch Behar, Darjeeling, Jalpaiguri, North and South Dinajpur and Malda and four contiguous districts of Assam which are Kokrajhar, Bongaigoan, Dhubri and Goalpara as well as the Kishanganj district in Bihar, and the Jhapa District in Nepal. The KLO was formed to address problems of the Koch Rajbongshi people such as large-scale unemployment, land alienation, perceived neglect of Kamtapuri language, identity, and grievances of economic deprivation.

== History ==
The beginning of the Kamtapur Liberation Organisation (KLO) can be traced to the attempts of certain members of the Koch Rajbongshi people belonging to the All Kamtapur Students Union (AKSU) to organise an armed struggle for a separate Kamtapur nation. For this purpose, they approached the United Liberation Front of Asom (ULFA). The KLO came into existence on 28 December 1993.

On 26 December 2013, a bomb blast took place in Jalpaiguri district of West Bengal that killed five persons and injured five others. Militants of KLO are suspected to have been behind the bombing, which occurred two days ahead of the 28 December 1996 foundation day of KLO.

== Leadership and organisation ==
Tamir Das alias Jibon Singha is the chairman of the KLO. He was arrested in October 1999 but regained control over the outfit after he was released by the Assam Police in a bid to make the other KLO cadres surrender. Milton Burman alias Mihir Das is the second in command of the outfit.

== Peace process ==
In 2023, the leader Jibon Singha announced a formal ceasefire and the start of a peace process with the government with all the cadres staying in government provided camps or rehabilitation centres. The group is ready to disband after the peace agreement will be signed. After the peace deal was signed, a faction known as the KLO-KN, led by Wangchu and Karang Koch, broke away and continued armed insurgency.

== See also ==
- Insurgency in Northeast India
- Kamata Kingdom
- Koch Bihar
- Koch dynasty
- Koch Hajo
- Koch Rajbongshi people
- Uttar Bango Tapsili Jati O Adibasi Sangathan
