= Kamtapur People's Party =

- Chairperson: Atul Roy
- Secretary: Nikhil Roy
- Founded: January 1996; 30 years ago
- Headquarters: Siliguri, Darjeeling district, West Bengal
- Student wing: All Koch Rajbongshi Students' Union (AKRSU)
- Ideology: Kamtapur statehood
- Alliance: National Democratic Alliance

Kamtapur People's Party (KPP) is a political party working in the northern parts of the Indian state of West Bengal. KPP was founded in January 1996 by Atul Roy. KPP works amongst the Rajbanshi population. KPP demands the set up of a separate Kamtapur state and recognition of the dialect of the Rajbanshi/Rajbongshi/Kamatapuri as a separate language.

The student wing of KPP is the All Kamtapur Students Union. The women's wing is called Kamtapur Women's Rights Forum.

== History ==
Ahead of the 2001 West Bengal assembly elections, KPP joined the All India Trinamool Congress-led Bangla Bachao Front.

In spring 2003, KPP suffered an internal division. Atul Roy, considered as a moderate, was dethroned and replaced by a more hardline leadership. Nikhil Roy became the new president of KPP and the general secretary was Subhas Burman. Atul Roy remained a member of the central committee.

Ahead of the 2004 Lok Sabha elections, KPP formed a front together with Jharkhand Mukti Morcha.

In 2006, Atul Roy broke away from Kamtapur People's Party to form a new party called the Kamtapur Progressive Party. However, Atul Roy and Nikhil Roy decided to end their dispute in October 2010 and Atul merged his party with Kamtapur People's Party. There is only one Kamtapur People's Party today. Atul Roy is the president of the party and Nikhil Roy is the general secretary.
