= Bangshi Badan Barman =

Indian politician

Bangshi Badan Barman is an Indian politician. A leading figure in the 'Greater Cooch Behar' movement, Barman is currently jailed after a 2005 riot.

Barman finished a Bengali Honours degree at Dinhata College in 1992. During his student days he was a members of the Students Federation of India.

In 1998 the Greater Cooch Behar People's Association (GCPA), an organisation striving to create a separate 'Greater Cooch Behar' state out of areas presently part of the state of West Bengal, was formed. Barman became the General Secretary of GCPA.

Barman was arrested following riots in Cooch Behar on 20 September 2005. Five people, three policemen (including an additional superintendent of police) and two pro-Greater Cooch Behar supporters, were killed in the clashes on that day. GCPA was holding protests in the city, erecting barricades.

When the GCPA was split in 2006, Barman sided with the break-away Greater Cooch Behar Democratic Party.

In June 2008, the GCBDP organised a fast-unto-death hunger strike, demanding the release of Bangshibadan Barman and 55 other followers of the party (who had been arrested at a 2005 GCPA meeting). The fast was, however, called off by the party on 9 June 2008, after talks with senior administration officials.

In April 2009, a bail pray for Barman was rejected by the Calcutta High Court.

In the 2009 Lok Sabha election, the GCBDP launched Bangshibadan Barman as its candidate in the Cooch Behar constituency. Barman became the first undertrial prisoner to file his nomination papers for a parliamentary election in West Bengal. He filed his candidature as an independent. In the end, Barman obtained 37,226 votes (3.3% of the votes in the constituency).
