= Progressive Alliance (disambiguation) =

The Progressive Alliance is an international coalition of social-democratic political parties founded in 2013.

Progressive alliance may also refer to:

- Progressive Alliance (Uruguay)
- Progressive Alliance of Liberia
- Progressive alliance (UK)
- Progressive Democratic Alliance, in British Columbia
- Progressive National Alliance, in Israel
- Progressive Peoples Alliance, in Nigeria
- United Progressive Alliance, coalition of Indian political parties led by the Indian National Congress

== See also ==
- Alliance of Progressives (Italy)
- Progressive Alliance of Socialists and Democrats (EU)
- Secular Progressive Alliance (India)
- Progressive (disambiguation)
- Progressive Party (disambiguation)
