= Progress Party =

Progress Party or Party of Progress may refer to:

== Active parties ==
- Progress Party (Denmark)
- Progress Party of Equatorial Guinea
- Gabonese Progress Party
- Progress Party (Iraq)
- Progress Party (Jersey)
- Progress Party (Norway)
- Progress Party (Russia)
- Alsatian Progress Party
- Saskatchewan Liberal Party
- Party of Progress (Germany)
- Party of Progressive Conservatives (Tunisia)
- Party of Progress and Socialism (Morocco)

== Former parties ==
- Australian Capital Territory Progress and Welfare Council
- Progress Party (Australia)
- Christian People's Party (Faroe Islands)
- German Progress Party
- Progress Party (Ghana)
- Progress Party (Iran)
- Progress Party (Norway, 1957)
- Progress Party (Sweden)
- Progress Party (Thailand, 1983)

== See also ==
- Progressive Party (disambiguation)
- Progressive Conservative Party of Canada
- Progressive Democratic Party (disambiguation)
- Progressive Green Party (disambiguation)
- Progress (disambiguation)
