= Kamtapur Progressive Party =

Kamtapur Progressive Party (now merged with Kamtapur People's Party) was a political party in northern West Bengal, India. Atul Roy was the president of the party. The party was formed after a split from the Kamtapur People's Party, ahead of the 2006 West Bengal Legislative Assembly election. The party demanded the formation of a Kamtapur state. KPP was a part of the National Democratic Alliance.

== Statehood issue ==
On the issue of the formation of a Kamtapur state, the Kamtapur Progressive Party and the Kamtapur People's Party had similar positions. The relation between the two parties was not very good however, as both blamed each other for the split in Kamtapur People's Party. Also, they diverged on the issue of support to Gorkha Janmukti Morcha (GJM). The Kamtapur Progressive Party was supportive of the GJM, whilst the Kamtapur People's Party opposed it. The Kamtapur People's Party rejected including lands they considered as belonging to Kamtapuris to be included in a Gorkhaland state. The Kamtapur Progressive Party on the other hand was less vocal on the exact delimitations between prospective Gorkhaland and Kamtapur states. The GJM and Kamtapur Progressive Party were cooperating with the Greater Cooch Behar Democratic Party, which was spearheading the campaign for a 'Greater Cooch Behar' state.

The Kamtapur Progressive Party also campaigned for constitutional recognition for the Kamtapuri language.

== 2009 election ==
In mid-April 2009, ahead of the Lok Sabha election, Kamtapur Progressive Party announced that it would support the Bharatiya Janata Party candidate Jaswant Singh in the Darjeeling constituency. The announcement was made after the BJP had pledged support for the central KPP demand of forming a 'Kamtapur state' out of the northern districts of West Bengal. Subsequently, the Nationalist Congress Party candidate in Darjeeling (who had been supported by the KPP), Shanta Kumar Singha, withdrew his candidature.

== Merger with Kamtapur People's Party ==
In October 2010, Atul Roy and Nikhil Roy (the then president of Kamtapur People's Party) decided to bury the hatchet and Atul merged his party with Kamtapur People's Party. There is only one Kamtapur People's Party today and Kamtapur Progressive Party ceased to exist. Atul Roy is the president of the party and Nikhil Roy is the general secretary.
