= Progressive Labor Party =

Progressive Labor Party or Progressive Labour Party may refer to:

- Progressive Labor Party (United States), a Marxist–Leninist political party based primarily in the U.S.
- Progressive Labour Party (Australia)
- Progressive Labour Party (Bermuda)
- Progressive Labour Party (Dominica)
- Progressive Labour Party (Saint Lucia)
- Progressive Labour Party (Sint Eustatius)
- Progressive Labour Movement in Antigua and Barbuda
- Progressive Labour Federation 47 in Suriname
- Progressive Labour Party of Alberta, Canada

== See also ==
- Progressive Party (disambiguation)
- PLP (disambiguation)
