= Bangla Bachao Front =

Bangla Bachao Front (Save Bengal Front), a front of opposition parties contesting the 2001 West Bengal legislative assembly elections. The front was led by All India Trinamool Congress and also included Bharatiya Janata Party, the Jharkhand Party, the Kamtapur Peoples Party, Samata Party and a break-away group of Biplobi Bangla Congress.

The front gave support to Gorkha National Liberation Front candidates in three constituencies.

== See also ==
- Politics of West Bengal
