= Uttar Bango Tapsili Jati O Adibasi Sangathan =

Organisation of dalits and adivasis of north Bengal, India

Uttar Bango Tapsili Jati O Adibasi Sangathan (lit. Northern Bengal Backward Caste and Adivasi Organisation; abbr.UTJAS) was a political movement amongst dalits and adivasis in northern West Bengal, India. UTJAS was led by Jugal Kishore Raybir. The movement worked for regional autonomy of areas in northern Bengal, a position that was in opposition to the West Bengal state government. On January 10, 1987, violence broke out at a UTJAS mass rally in Alipurduar, with clashes with Communist Party of India (Marxist) (CPI(M)) cadres and police. After this event, UTJAS lost its prominence. According to the CSDS scholar Yogendra Yadav, the crack-down on UTJAS contributed to the emergence of the militant Kamtapur Liberation Organization.
