= Greater Cooch Behar Democratic Party =

Political party in northern West Bengal, India

The Greater Cooch Behar Democratic Party (GCBDP) is a political party based in the northern regions of West Bengal, India. The party advocates for the creation of a separate state, termed Greater Cooch Behar. It was established in 2006 following a split from the Greater Cooch Behar People's Association (GCPA).

== History ==
The GCBDP was formed when internal disagreements led to a division within the GCPA. Ashutosh Barma became the president of the newly formed party. Bangshibadan Barman, who was the general secretary of the GCPA and incarcerated at the time, chose to support the GCBDP during the split and joined the party.

== Alliances ==
The GCBDP has collaborated with the Kamtapur Progressive Party, which also seeks the creation of a separate Kamtapur state. An alliance among three regional parties, including GCBDP and the Kamtapur Progressive Party, was announced in March 2008. Despite potential territorial overlaps in their respective statehood demands, the parties agreed to put such issues aside to focus on cooperative efforts.

== Hunger strike ==
In June 2008, the GCBDP staged a fast-unto-death hunger strike demanding the release of Bangshibadan Barman and 55 other activists who had been arrested during a 2005 GCPA event. The protest was called off on 9 June 2008 following discussions with senior administrative officials.

== 2009 Lok Sabha election ==
In the 2009 Indian general election, the GCBDP fielded Bangshibadan Barman as its candidate for the Cooch Behar constituency. Barman became the first undertrial prisoner in West Bengal to file nomination papers for a parliamentary election. He received 37,226 votes, accounting for 3.3% of the total votes in the constituency.

== See also ==
- Kamtapur Progressive Party
- Greater Cooch Behar People's Association
- Cooch Behar statehood demand
