= Democratic Progressive Party (disambiguation) =

The Democratic Progressive Party is a political party in Taiwan founded in 1986.

Democratic Progressive Party may also refer to:

- Democratic Progressive Party (Argentina), founded 1914
- Democratic Progressive Party (Austria), 1965–1966
- Democratic Progressive Party of Hong Kong, a localist group founded 2015
- Democratic Party (Japan, 2016), 2016–17, sometimes referred to as "Democratic Progressive Party" due to its official Japanese name
- Democratic Progressive Party (Malawi), founded 2005
- Democratic Progressive Party (Nagaland)
- Democratic Progressive Party (Paraguay), founded 2007
- Sammarinese Democratic Progressive Party, San Marino, 1990–2001
- Democratic Progressive Party (Singapore), founded 1973
- Democratic Progressive Party (Transkei), South Africa, 1981–1986
- Democratic Progressive Party (Spain), created in 1879
- Kurdish Democratic Progressive Party, Syria, founded in 1965

== See also ==
- Progressive Democratic Party (disambiguation)
