= Progressive Party =

Progressive Party may refer to:

== Active parties ==
- Progressive Party of Aotearoa New Zealand
- Progressive Party, Brazil
- Progressive Conservative Association of Nova Scotia, Canada
- Progressive Party (Chile)
- Progressive Party of Working People, Cyprus
- Dominica Progressive Party
- Progressive Party (Iceland)
- Progressive Party (Sardinia), Italy
- Jordanian Progressive Party
- Serbian Progressive Party in Macedonia
- Sabah Progressive Party, Malaysia
- Progressive Party of Maldives
- Martinican Progressive Party, Martinique
- Nigerien Progressive Party – African Democratic Rally, Niger
- Serbian Progressive Party
- Progressive Party (South Korea, 2017)
- Progressive Party (United States, 2020)
- Progressive Party of Tanzania – Maendeleo
- Progressive Party (Trinidad and Tobago)
- Oregon Progressive Party, USA
- Vermont Progressive Party, USA
- Melanesian Progressive Party, Vanuatu

== Historical or former parties ==
- Progressive Party (1901), Australia
- Progressive Party (1920), Australia
- Czech Realist Party (Czech Progressive Party), Austria-Hungary
- Progressive Party (Belgium)
- Toledo Progressive Party, Belize
- Progressive Party (Brazil, 1993)
- Progressive Party of Canada
- Progressive Party of Manitoba (1920–32)
- Progressive Party of Manitoba (1981–95)
- Progressive Party of Saskatchewan
- Progressive Party (Cape Colony)
- Chadian Progressive Party
- Progressive Party (China)
- Congolese Progressive Party
- Progressive Party (Greece) (1954–84)
- Progressive Party (Greece, Kafantaris)
- Kamtapur Progressive Party, India
- Donegal Progressive Party, Ireland
- Progressive Party (Israel)
- Progressive Party of Ivory Coast
- Moldavian Progressive Party
- Jim Anderton's Progressive Party, New Zealand
- Progressive Party (Philippines)
- Progressive Party (Portugal)
- Progressive Party (Russia)
- Saint Helena Progressive Party
- Serbian Progressive Party (historical) (1881–1919)
- Progressive Party (Singapore)
- Progressive Party (Spain)
- Progressive Party (South Africa)
- Progressive Party (South Korea, 1956)
- New Progressive Party (South Korea)
- Unified Progressive Party, South Korea
- Swaziland Progressive Party
- Progressive Party (Thailand)
- Progressive Party (London), United Kingdom
- Progressive Party (Scotland), United Kingdom

=== United States ===
- Progressive Party (United States, 1912–1920) (Bull Moose Party)
- Progressive Party (United States, 1924–1927)
- National Progressives of America
- Progressive Party (United States, 1948–1955)
- California Progressive Party
- Minnesota Progressive Party
- Wisconsin Progressive Party

== See also ==
- Democratic Progressive Party, Taiwan
- National Progressive Party (disambiguation)
- New Progressive Party (disambiguation)
- Progress Party (disambiguation)
- Progressive Alliance (disambiguation)
- Progressive Conservative Party (disambiguation)
- Progressive Constitutionalist Party (disambiguation)
- Progressive Democratic Party (disambiguation)
- Progressive Green Party (disambiguation)
- Progressive Labor Party (disambiguation)
- Progressive National Party (disambiguation)
- Progressive People's Party (disambiguation)
- Progressive Reform Party (disambiguation)
- Progressive Republican Party (disambiguation)
- United Progressive Party (disambiguation)
- Progressive Union (disambiguation)
- Dravida Munnetra Kazhagam (lit. 'Dravidian Progressive Party'), India
  - Marumalarchi Dravida Munnetra Kazhagam (lit. 'Revival Dravidian Progressive Party'), breakaway faction of the above
- Kongunadu Munnetra Kazhagam (lit. 'Kongunadu Progressive Party'), India
- Jinbodang (disambiguation) lit. 'Progressive Party', Korea
