= Progressive Union =

Progressive Union may refer to:

- Progressive Union (Benin)
- Progressive Union (Brazil)
- Progressive Union (France)
- Progressive Union (Greece)
- Progressive Valdostan Union (1973), Italy
- Progressive Valdostan Union (2013), Italy
- Progressive Union of Menorca, Spain

== See also ==
- Progressive Party (disambiguation)
