= Short shifting =

Driving technique

Short shifting is a driving technique in which the gear is changed up before reaching maximum engine RPM or, more precisely, the acceleration optimized RPM shift-point. By short shifting, the engine does not reach its power band, and therefore maximum vehicle acceleration is not attained for the gear from which the short shift was performed.

In racing, short-shifting is a technique intended to avoid losing valuable acceleration time changing gears later. Although this means not being able to accelerate using the engine's peak power at the moment of the gear change, total acceleration over time may be greater as no acceleration can happen during the gear change. This can aid overtaking by ensuring that the car is in the right gear in anticipation of a maneuver.

The most common reason for a short-shift in day-to-day driving is to improve fuel economy. By keeping the engine at the lower end of its RPM range less fuel is consumed. This is especially common in "torquey" vehicles, vehicles whose engine torque curve peaks at lower RPM than the power curve, because the higher torque at low RPM allows for better acceleration characteristics without winding the engine up into its powerband. Many diesel truck drivers practice a specific type of short-shifting called progressive shifting, wherein the RPM shift point is increased with each gear but is still short of the power band.

Another reason is to intentionally reduce power and/or torque to improve traction in sub-optimal road conditions. For example, applying full engine power to the drive-wheels on wet or icy roads may cause the wheels to slip. Likewise, short-shifting can help maintain vehicle stability through bends by avoiding an unsettling shift in balance mid-corner.
