= New Progressive Party =

New Progressive Party may refer to:

- New Progressive Party (Japan)
- New Progressive Party (Puerto Rico)
- New Progressive Party (South Korea), a left-wing political party in South Korea

== See also ==
- Progressive Party (disambiguation)
- List of political parties by name
