= Jordanian Progressive Party =

Jordanian political party

Jordanian Progressive Party (Arabic: الحزب التقدمي الأردني, Al-Hizb al-Taqadumiu al-'Urduniyu) is a Jordanian political party. The party emerged from a split in the Jordanian People's Democratic Party, parallel to the split in the Democratic Front for the Liberation of Palestine over the Oslo Agreements. The founders of the Jordanian Progressive Party sided with Yasser Abd Rabbo in the split. The party was registered with Jordanian authorities in 1993. The general secretary of the party is Fawaz Mahmood Muflih Zou′bi, MP. Na′el Emran Barakat is the deputy general secretary.

The party publishes al-Huriyyah.

== See also ==
- List of political parties in Jordan
