= Kamtapur =

Kamatapur
- Autonomous Administrative Division
- Location within Assam Location within India
- Sovereign state: India
- State: Assam
- Time zone: UTC+5:30 (IST)

Kamtapur is an autonomous area in the Assam state of India administered by the Kamatapur Autonomous Council.

== History ==
Kamatapur emerged as a sovereign state in the middle of the 13th century, and it continued through fluctuating levels of prosperity until the year 1498, when its last capital at Gosanimari was attacked by the invading army of Alauddin Husain Shah of Bengal.

The ancient kingdom of Kamatapur was located in the western Brahmaputra Valley. Most probably, Nalrajar Garh in Chilapata forest was its earliest capital. Through a long course of changes and developments the capital shifted to Maynaguri and then to Prithu Rajar Garh, Singijani and finally Gosanimari, an ancient river port-town since the seventh century. After the kingdom's end, the Koch Kingdom emerged with its capital at Hingulavas in the Dooars.

Nilambar was the last ruler of Kamatapur. He was defeated by Alauddin Husain Shah in 1498.

== Distribution ==
The homelands of the Koch Rajbongshi people comprise their ancient kingdom, Kamatapur, the Koch Kingdom, and the Kamarupa Kingdom.

== Culture ==
Koch Rajbongshi community events and also in general day-to-day life. Women and Men of Koch Rajbongshi have sets of traditional dress and jewellery. Patani being worn by the women of this community and men wear Noucha/gamsha/dhoti and a yellow color piece of cloth surrounded in the neck for men, They wear this yellow color cloth in their neck as a mark of respect for nature, elderly people also have a tradition to wear a turban or a lengthy cloth wrapped around their head.

Women wear patani from the chest till below the knee but it does not touch the ankle, the cloth stays about 6&cm above the ground. The reason for wearing Patani not till the ground level or till the ankle because they believe that water is a sacred as it is a part of the nature so while crossing lake or river the cloth should not touch the water, it is a mark of respect to the nature and they believe that if cloth touch the water the purification of the water goes away and thus how they can not use it in their traditional ritual practice of worshiping nature, In-fact the men wear (gamasha(5 ft long ) /Naucha ( 9 ft Long), This Naucha or Gamasha they wear from the waist till the knee, it never touch the ankle because they believe that water is a sacred as it is a part of the nature so while crossing lake or river the cloth should not touch the water, it is a mark of respect to the nature and they believe that if cloth touch the water the purification of the water goes away and thus how they can not use it in their traditional ritual practice of worshiping nature. They wear a kind of Turban, in their head, it is a long length cloth wrapped in the head of the elderly men or significant person in the community to symbolist or high priest, in modern days people can wear the turban who have comparatively higher status and respect in the society.

Koch Rajbongshi women get up early in the morning and clean the house with a broom made up of bamboo. They then give water and food to all the animals first, then they take their breakfast. When they eat, if they have a pet, they also eat along with them the same breakfast; it is a ritual and tradition. Keeping parrots as pets is a tradition of the Koch Rajbonshi (reason is still not known). Whenever Koch Rajbongshi people go for hunting, they take the permission from the elder and from the nature to allow them to go for hunting. It is a tradition of Koch Rajbongshi not to kill any animal for pleasure, but only for consumption. During spring they don not go for hunting because this is the time animal gives birth, so they don't kill animal this time, for managing spring time they dry meat before in well advanced, and they also keep ferment fish in their house to manage this time period. Koch Rajbongshi People do not eat all kinds of animal some of them they consider as bad for there community if they kill (for e.g. crow) They don't kill doves or even they don't keep as pet in the house but if a dove comes and makes a nest, it is considered as good luck for the community and for the family. Seeing a peacock while hunting is considered good luck. Koch Rajbongshi people do not kill or eat peacock, but they do catch them to collect feathers for medicinal use before releasing the bird. Koch Rajbongshi people make fans out of coconut tree leaves, tal plant leaves, and bamboo. Kitchens in Koch Rajbongshi households are made from mud.

== See also ==
- Koch Rajbongshi people
- Koch dynasty
- Kamata Kingdom
- Koch Bihar
- Koch Hajo
- Kamtapur Liberation Organization
