= Progressive Democratic Party (Thailand) =

Progressive Democratic Party พรรคประชาธิปไตยก้าวหน้า
- Founded: 5 March 2005
- Dissolved: 30 May 2007
- Headquarters: Bangkok, Thailand

The Progressive Democratic Party, (Thai: ประชาธิปไตยก้าวหน้า, Prachathipatai Kao Na) is a minor political party in Thailand that was dissolved. It was founded on 5 March 2005, and had about 11,000 members at its peak. On 30 May 2007 its dissolution was ordered by the Constitutional Court, as the party had falsified membership records of their candidates for the 2006 election in Trang Province.
