= United Progressive Party (disambiguation) =

The United Progressive Party is a major political party in Antigua and Barbuda.

United Progressive Party may also refer to:

- Unified Progressive Party (South Korea)
- United Progressive Party (Saint Vincent and the Grenadines)
- United Progressive Party (Barbados)
- United Progressive Party (Ghana)
- United Progressive Party (Zambia)
- United Progressive Party, a party in New Zealand that was reconstituted as the Christian Democrat Party
