= GPM6A =

Protein-coding gene in the species Homo sapiens

Identifiers
- Aliases: GPM6A, GPM6, M6A, glycoprotein M6A
- External IDs: OMIM: 601275; MGI: 107671; GeneCards: GPM6A

Gene location (Human)
Chr.	Chromosome 4 (human)
Band	4q34.2	Start	175,632,934 bp
Band	4q34.2	End	176,002,664 bp

Gene location (Mouse)
Chr.	Chromosome 8 (mouse)
Band	8|8 B1.3	Start	55,407,878 bp
Band	8|8 B1.3	End	55,513,906 bp
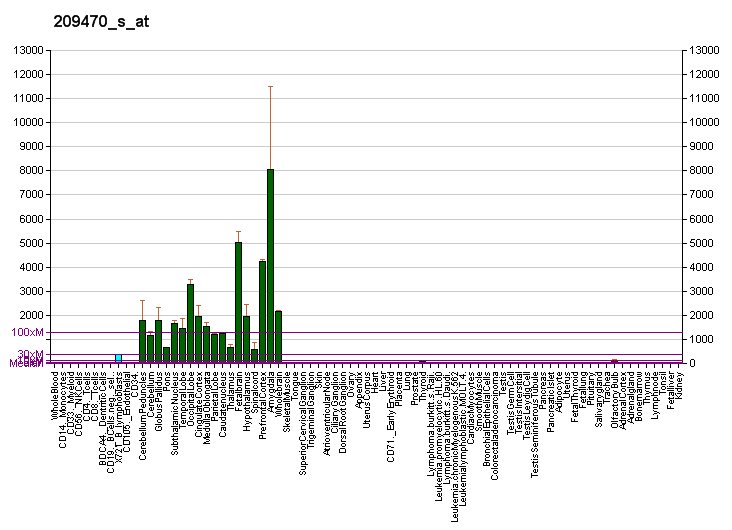

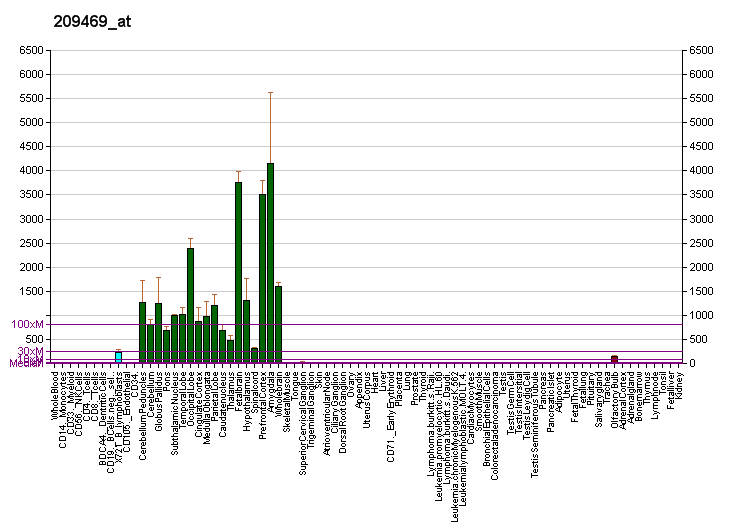
RNA expression pattern
Bgee	Human / Mouse (ortholog); Top expressed in: endothelial cell; Brodmann area 23; entorhinal cortex; superior frontal gyrus; orbitofrontal cortex; Region I of hippocampus proper; postcentral gyrus; primary visual cortex; middle temporal gyrus; paraflocculus of cerebellum / Top expressed in: subiculum; piriform cortex; anterior amygdaloid area; Region I of hippocampus proper; lobe of cerebellum; primary motor cortex; cingulate gyrus; lateral septal nucleus; cerebellar vermis; prefrontal cortex; More reference expression data
BioGPS	More reference expression data
Gene ontology
Molecular function	calcium channel activity; protein binding
Cellular component	integral component of membrane; extracellular vesicle; cell projection; membrane; filopodium; plasma membrane; dendritic spine; axonal growth cone; axon; soma; neuron projection; extracellular exosome; glutamatergic synapse; integral component of presynaptic active zone membrane
Biological process	neuron projection morphogenesis; neuron migration; stem cell differentiation; nervous system development; calcium ion transmembrane transport; synapse assembly; positive regulation of filopodium assembly; neural retina development; response to bacterium; neuron projection development; regulation of synapse organization
Sources:Amigo / QuickGO
Orthologs
Databases	NCBI: entry; OMA: entry
Species	Human	Mouse
Entrez	2823	234267
Ensembl	ENSG00000150625	ENSMUSG00000031517
UniProt	P51674	P35802
RefSeq (mRNA)	NM_001261447; NM_001261448; NM_005277; NM_201591; NM_201592 NM_001388090; NM_001388091	NM_001253754; NM_001253756; NM_153581
RefSeq (protein)	NP_001248376; NP_001248377; NP_005268; NP_963885; NP_963886	NP_001240683; NP_001240685; NP_705809
Location (UCSC)	Chr 4: 175.63 – 176 Mb	Chr 8: 55.41 – 55.51 Mb
PubMed search
- Wikidata
View/Edit Human	View/Edit Mouse

Neuronal membrane glycoprotein M6-a is a protein that in humans is encoded by the GPM6A gene.
