= Progressive Republican Party =

Progressive Republican Party may refer to:

- Progressive Republican Party (Algeria)
- Progressive Republican Party (Brazil)
- Progressive Republican Party (Spain)
- Progressive Republican Party (Turkey)
- Progressive Republican Party (Venezuela)
- Progressive Republicans (France)

== See also ==
- Progressive Party (disambiguation)
