= Progressio (disambiguation) =

Progressio was an international charitable organization.

Progressio may also refer to:

- Populorum progressio, encyclical written by Pope Paul VI on the topic of "the development of peoples" and that the economy of the world should serve mankind and not just the few
- Communio et Progressio, pastoral instruction on the means of social communication published in 1971, written after the Second Vatican Council
- In Harmonia Progressio, motto of Institut Teknologi Bandung, a public university in Bandung, Indonesia
- Progressio, a rhetorical device involving repeated antithesis
