= Progressive Unionist =

Progressive Unionist may refer to:

- Progressive Unionist Party, a Northern Irish party
- Vanguard Progressive Unionist Party, a Northern Irish party
- Ulster Progressive Unionist Association, a Northern Irish political group
