= GPM6B =

Protein-coding gene in humans

Identifiers
- Aliases: GPM6B, M6B, glycoprotein M6B
- External IDs: OMIM: 300051; MGI: 107672; GeneCards: GPM6B

Gene location (Human)
Chr.	X chromosome (human)
Band	Xp22.2	Start	13,770,939 bp
Band	Xp22.2	End	13,938,638 bp

Gene location (Mouse)
Chr.	X chromosome (mouse)
Band	X|X F5	Start	165,021,907 bp
Band	X|X F5	End	165,171,984 bp
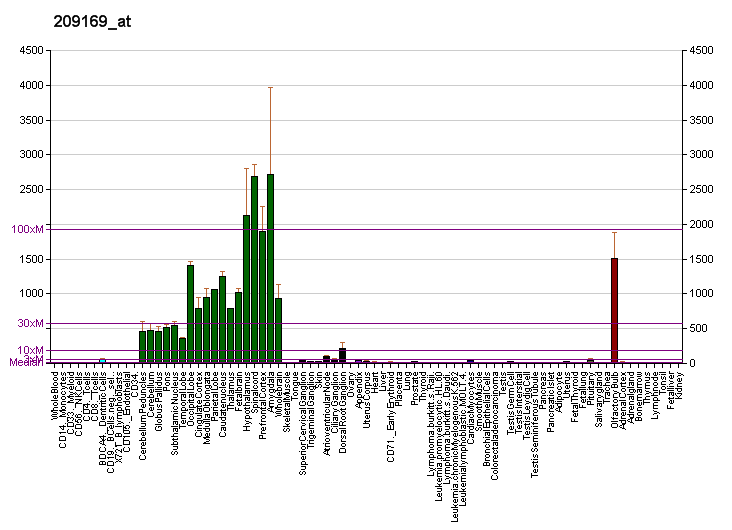

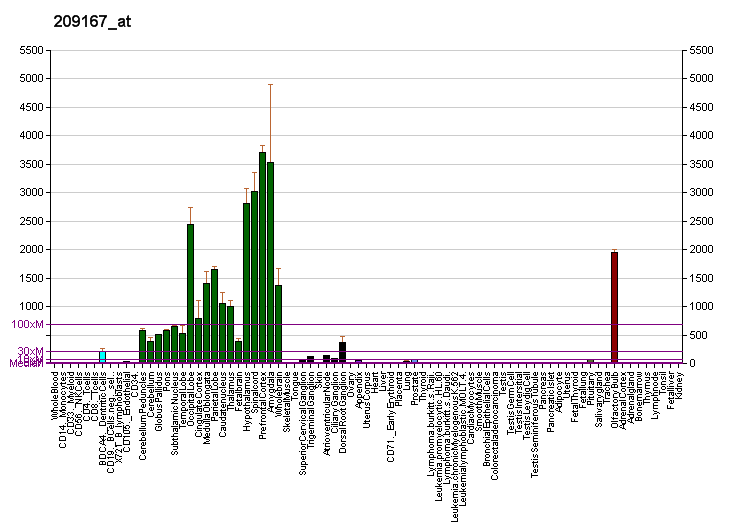

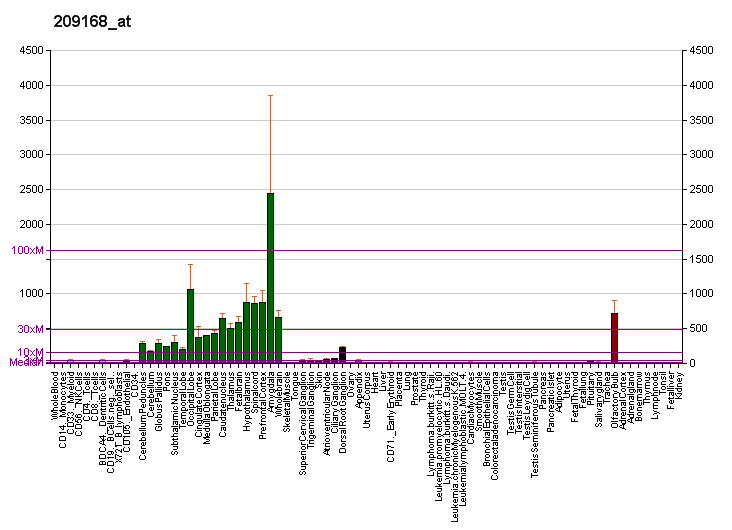
RNA expression pattern
Bgee	Human / Mouse (ortholog); Top expressed in: dorsal motor nucleus of vagus nerve; external globus pallidus; inferior ganglion of vagus nerve; inferior olivary nucleus; subthalamic nucleus; Region I of hippocampus proper; pars reticulata; optic nerve; postcentral gyrus; pars compacta / Top expressed in: lobe of cerebellum; dorsal striatum; olfactory tubercle; cerebellar vermis; optic nerve; globus pallidus; nucleus accumbens; deep cerebellar nuclei; prefrontal cortex; lateral septal nucleus; More reference expression data
BioGPS	More reference expression data
Gene ontology
Molecular function	molecular function
Cellular component	integral component of membrane; membrane raft; plasma membrane; membrane
Biological process	regulation of focal adhesion assembly; protein transport; multicellular organism development; negative regulation of serotonin uptake; cell differentiation; negative regulation of protein localization to cell surface; regulation of actin cytoskeleton organization; extracellular matrix assembly; ossification; nervous system development; positive regulation of bone mineralization; neuron projection development
Sources:Amigo / QuickGO
Orthologs
Databases	NCBI: entry; OMA: entry
Species	Human	Mouse
Entrez	2824	14758
Ensembl	ENSG00000046653	ENSMUSG00000031342
UniProt	Q13491	P35803
RefSeq (mRNA)	NM_001001994; NM_001001995; NM_001001996; NM_005278; NM_001318729	NM_001177955; NM_001177956; NM_001177957; NM_001177958; NM_001177959 NM_001177960; NM_001177961; NM_001177962; NM_023122
RefSeq (protein)	NP_001001994; NP_001001995; NP_001001996; NP_001305658; NP_005269	NP_001171426; NP_001171427; NP_001171428; NP_001171429; NP_001171430 NP_001171431; NP_001171432; NP_001171433; NP_075611
Location (UCSC)	Chr X: 13.77 – 13.94 Mb	Chr X: 165.02 – 165.17 Mb
PubMed search
- Wikidata
View/Edit Human	View/Edit Mouse

Neuronal membrane glycoprotein M6-b is a protein that in humans is encoded by the GPM6B gene.

In melanocytic cells, GPM6B gene expression may be regulated by MITF.
