= Progressive Reform Party =

Progressive Reform Party may refer to:

- Progressive Reform Party (South Africa)
- Progressive Reform Party (Suriname)

== See also ==
- Progressive Party (disambiguation)
