= Naranarayan Garh =

Fortress in West Bengal, India

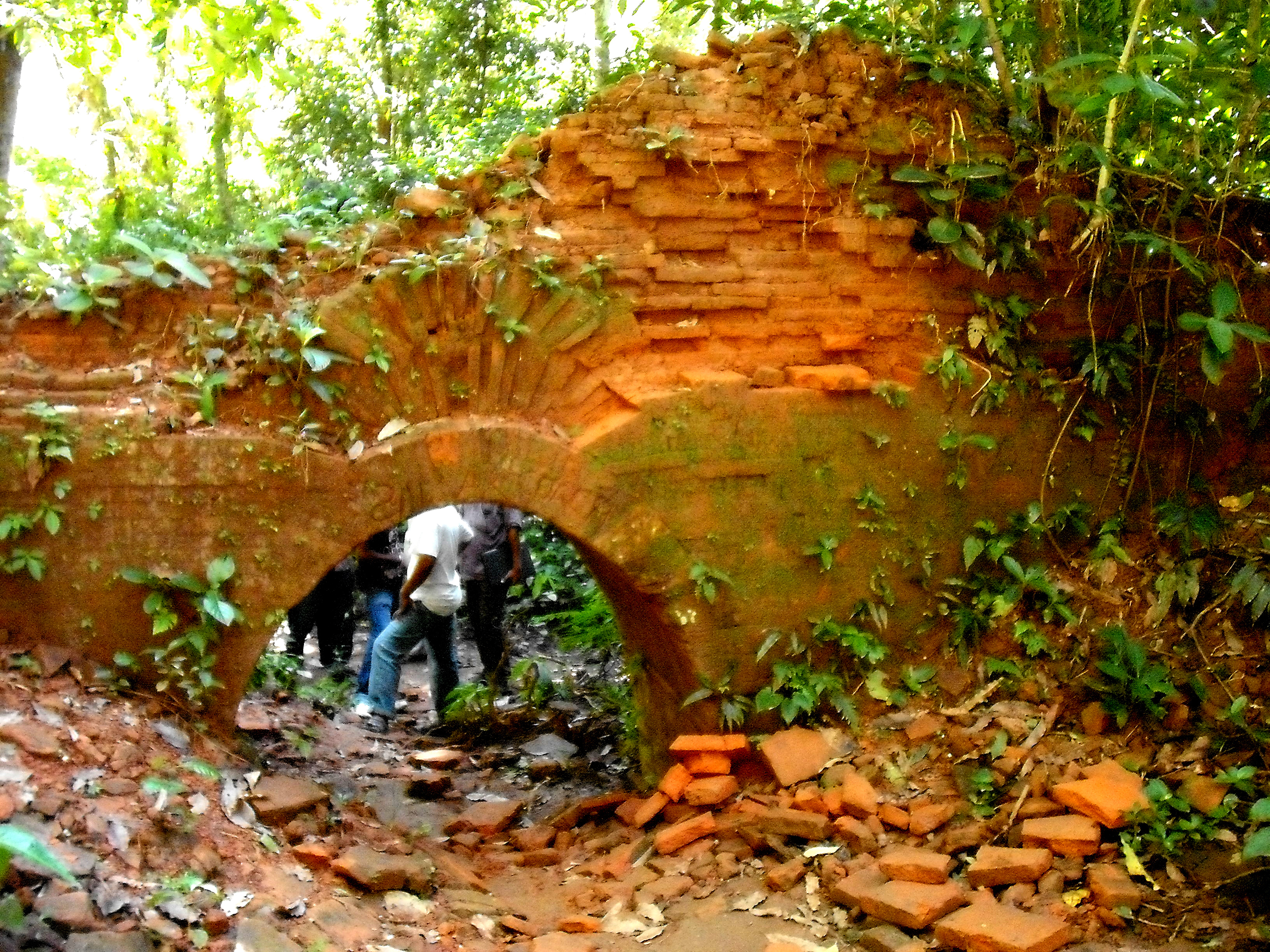
The ruins of the Naranarayan Garh

Naranarayan Garh, also known as the Fort of King Naranarayan is a dilapidated fort in the Chilapata forests of West Bengal in India. It was formerly known as the Nal Rajar Garh. The present remains of the fort's ruins consists of a sub-angular brick wall, dilapidated fortification walls and, traces of moats and waterways.

The fort was long attributed to King Nal, a ruler during the late Gupta period. Besides it, different historians also associated it with various other kingdoms and rulers. In 2025, the West Bengal State Heritage Commission and other officials identified the fort to have been built by Nara Narayan, a 16th-century king of the Koch dynasty. Subsequently, the fort was renamed.

== History ==
Naranarayan Garh was made by Koch king Nara Narayan in the latter half of the 1500 AD. He constructed this fort to protect the region from the Nepalese, Chinese, Tibetan and particularly Bhutanese kingdoms' attacks. The fort used to house thousands of soldiers who were trained in Guerrilla warfare.

Prior to 2025, there were confusions about which monarch created it. In 2025, the West Bengal State Heritage Commission officially announced that after prolonged research, it has been concluded that this fort was made by Koch king Nara Narayan. Henceforth, the fort was renamed to Naranarayan Garh from its misidentified previous name Nal Rajar Garh. The surrounding forest was named Chilapata Forests after Bir Chila Roy, Nara Narayan's commander-in-chief.

Many earlier sources considered this fort to have been constructed during the late Gupta era, in 5th century AD, under the reign of King Nal. Ergo, this fort was referred to as the Nal Rajar Garh. Some historians considered it to be a part of the ancient Pundravardhana Kingdom, while some others considered it to be a part of the Kamata Kingdom. Some even considered that this fort was made by the Koch king Prananaryan between 1655 to 1662.

== Architecture and layout ==
The fort is approximately located at 89.22° longitude and 23.23° latitude. The ruins of Naranarayan Garh indicate that the layout of the fortress and its fortified town had similarities to the city planning of Chang'an in ancient China. The ruins also suggest the presence of a well developed system of waterways, boat harbours, canals and culverts in around the fortress and its fortified town.

The surrounding Chilapata Forests

The fort has a rectangular outline. A central moat divides the fort into two parts, separating a smaller rectangular section towards the north-east. The smaller part measures 113.80 m in length and 41.40 m in width. The whole complex is encircled by one moat in some sections and two moats in some other. The central moat goes eastward through the Chilapata forests and joins the Bania River. A section of the central moat follows the outer boundary of the complex and connects to another moat along the fort's extended perimeter. The L-shaped moat has right-angled sides and steps at several points. It measures 13.20 m in width.

The fortification wall had two arches with sub-angular apexes and three marginal courses of headers in the western and southern walls. There are fifteen niches in the fort, each measuring 0.44 m in breadth at the base and 0.65 m in height. All of them are aligned along the southern reinforcement pillar of the western rampart. The niches have sloping bases and reclining chimneys made of terracotta rings within the core of the reinforcement pillar.

The fort and its surrounding walls are made with burnt-kiln bricks. Various iron smelting works have been located within the extended boundary of the fort's ruins. In one part of a moat, traces of the staircases of a pond's ghat has been found. There is also a dilapidated temple made from sandstone, in the vicinities of the fort, which dates between 10th century to 12th century AD.

== Rediscovery ==
In 1951, owing to the efforts of Alipurduar district's Sub-divisional magistrate J.C. Sengupta and Jalpaiguri district's District magistrate Koronaketan Sen, the fort was enlisted in the government records for the first time. In 1966-1967, the Archaeological Survey of India excavated and surveyed the place under the leadership of Pareshchandra Dasgupta. The work had to be stopped after three months, due to the arrival of monsoon. But surveying works were never resumed for a long period, until the 2020s.

== Conservation ==
The Archaeological Survey of India and Jaldapara National Park had a dispute between themselves regarding the method of conservation of this part. This stalled the allocation of funds, which impeded the subsequent conservation of the fort.

In July 2025, the Alipurduar Tourism Heritage Society and the West Bengal State Heritage Commission proposed to preserve the fort. They further planned to create an open-air museum dedicated to the history of the Cooch Behar district and the Koch dynasty, to convert the place into a tourist attraction.

== Bibliography ==
- Das Gupta, Paresh Chandra (18 April 1968). Nalrajar Garh- A Fortification Lost in Jungle. Contributed by South Asia Pamphlet Collection. Directorate Of Archaeology And Museums, Govt. Of West Bengal.
- Sharma, Arun Kumar; Margabandhu, Chedarambattu; Joshi, Jagat Pati; Singh Bisht, Ranvir (2002). Puraratna: Emerging Trends in Archaeology, Art, Anthropology, Conservation, and History. Agam Kala Prakashan. ISBN 978-81-7320-046-5 – via University of Michigan.
- South Asian Studies: Journal of the Society for South Asian Studies. Contributed by Society for South Asian Studies, Incorporating the Society for Afghan Studies and British Association for South Asian Studies. The Society. 1992. p. 153 – via University of Michigan.
- Datta, Asok Kumar, ed. (1991). Studies in Archaeology. Contributed by Paresh Chandra Das Gupta. Books & Books. pp. 237–238. ISBN 9788185016290 – via University of Michigan.
