= Potato Diversion Program =

USDA potato program

The Potato Diversion Program (PDP) is a USDA program under which farmers are paid to divert potatoes to charitable institutions, livestock feed, ethanol production, and/or render them nonmarketable and destroyed. The most recent program was for 2000 crop fresh russet potatoes with expenditures limited to $10.25 million. There also was a 1997 program to divert fresh Irish round white and russet potatoes to charitable institutions or for use as livestock feed. The program is administered by the Agricultural Marketing Service and implemented in the field by the Farm Service Agency. The objective of PDP is to reduce potato supply in the market in order to raise prices that farmers get.
