= Progres, Kardzhali Province =

Coordinates: 41.4958°N 25.4100°E

Progres Прогрес
- Village
- Interactive map of Progres
- Country: Bulgaria
- Province: Kardzhali Province
- Municipality: Momchilgrad
- Time zone: UTC+2 (EET)
  - Summer (DST): UTC+3 (EEST)

Progres is a village in Momchilgrad Municipality, Kardzhali Province, southern Bulgaria.
