= Progressive shifting =

Progressive shifting is a technique for changing gears commonly practiced by drivers of semi-trailer trucks. It is meant to reduce fuel consumption — something very important for drivers who travel several hundred miles each day.

Progressive shifting is accomplished by changing gears upward as early as possible when accelerating while staying within the flat torque range. Each shift will go a little higher into the RPM until the vehicle is in its top gear at cruising speed. After each shift is completed, the engine and transmission should be operating at or near the lowest rpm speeds recommended by the manufacturers of those parts.

The fastest acceleration is achieved when the truck is receiving as close as possible to maximum power throughout the entire time it is accelerating. E.g. in a truck with a Caterpillar C15 engine, it is achieved by going all the way up to 1950RPM, then shifting to a gear that will put the engine at 1500RPM.

In contrast, using progressive shifting, i.e. maintaining maximum torque, the overall acceleration is slower but there is increased fuel efficiency and lower wear of the engine due to lower RPM.
