= Chilapata Forests =

Chilapata Forest
- forest
- Location within West Bengal Location within India
- Coordinates: 26.550556°N 89.379722°E
- Country: India
- State: West Bengal
- District: Alipurduar

The Chilapata Forest is a dense forest near Jaldapara National Park in Dooars, Alipurduar district, West Bengal, India. It is about 40 km from Alipurduar, and just a few minutes away from Hasimara town.

== Ecology ==
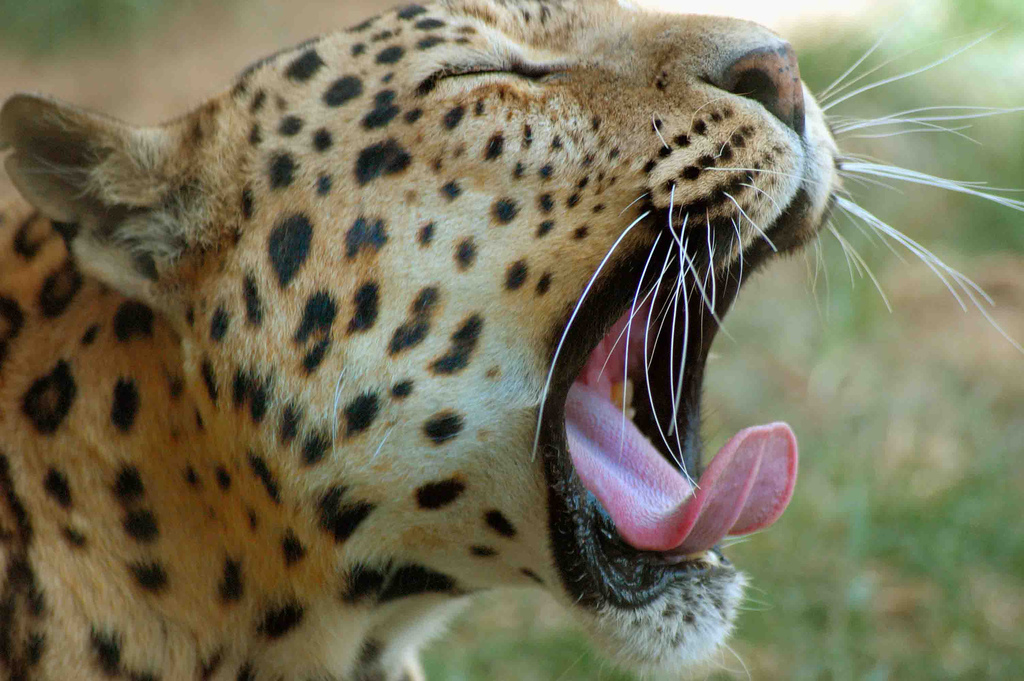
Indian Leopard

The forest forms an elephant corridor between Jaldapara National Park and the Buxa Tiger Reserve, and is rich in wildlife. New species continue to be found. The forest used to be home to large Rhinoceros populations. In hunting expeditions in 1892-1904, in and around Chilapata Forest, the Maharajah of Cooch Behar recorded killing one rhino, injuring another, and sighting of over 14. Rhinos now are extremely rare. Indian leopards are still common.

It is hoped that eco-tourism will provide a new source of income for the indigenous Rabha people, who now depend on the forest mainly for firewood.

== Tourism ==
West Bengal State Forest Development Agency (WBSFDA) runs an eco-tourism resort at Kodalbasti, providing basic accommodation.

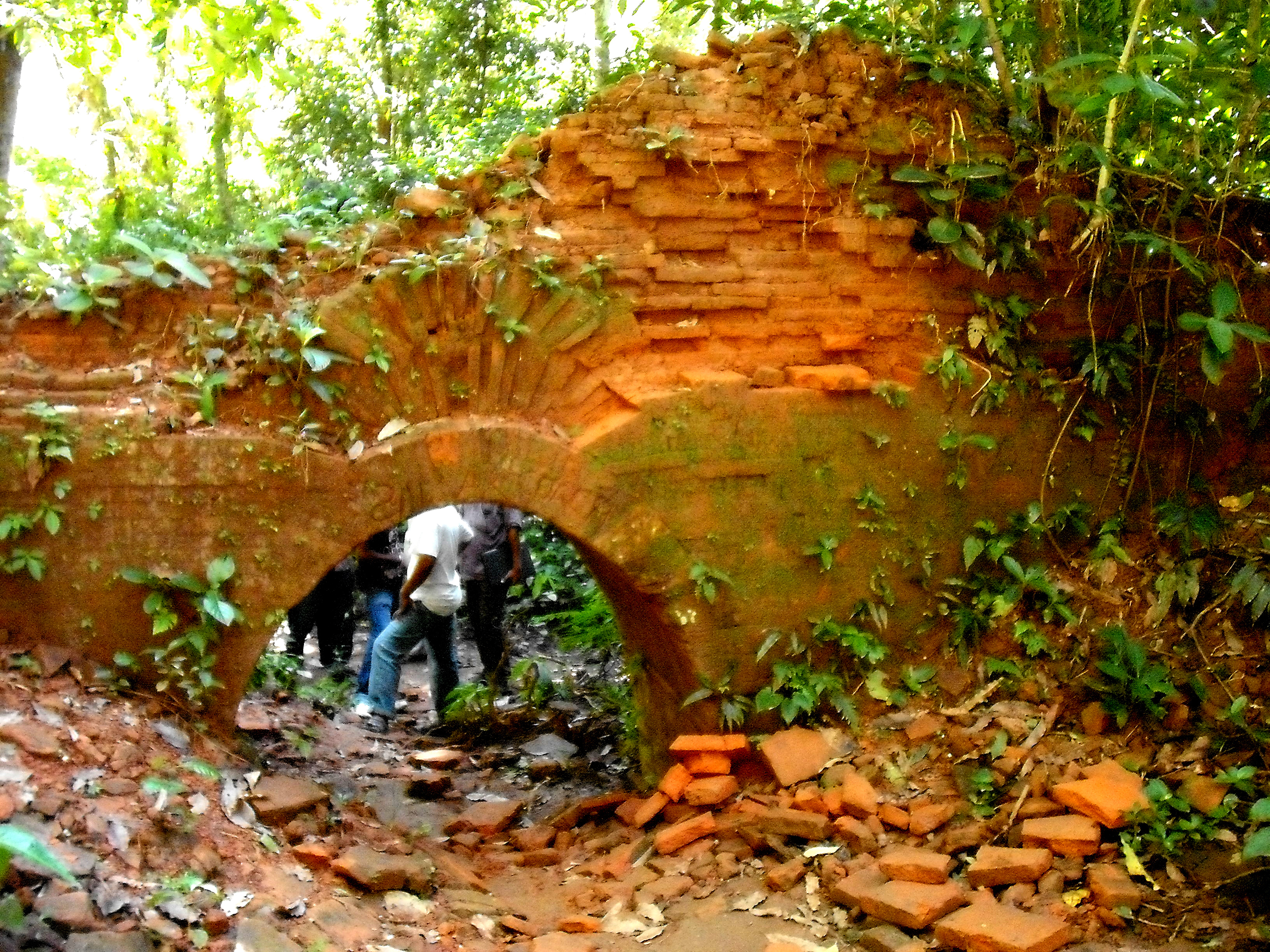
The ruins of the Naranarayan Garh

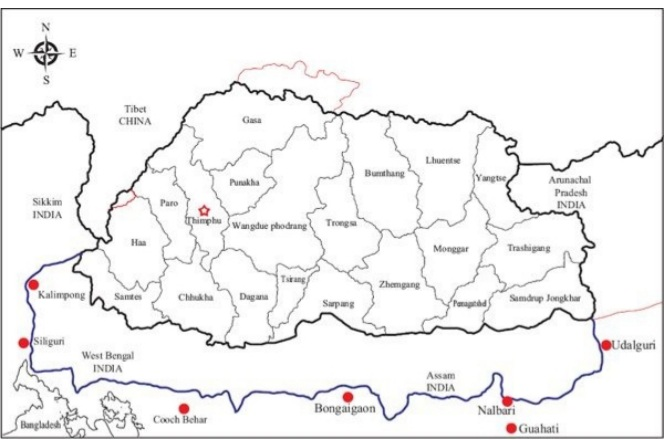
Southern Boundary of Bhutan in blue before the Duar War of 1865

One of the main attractions is the ruined Naranarayan Garh, built by king Nara Narayan. Although poorly maintained, the site has considerable archaeological interest. Other activities include Tonga rides through Mathura tea garden, boating on the Bania river and angling on the confluence of the Kalchini, Bania and Buri Basra.
