= Progress (disambiguation) =

Progress is advancement to a higher or more developed state.

Progress or PROGRESS may also refer to:

== Architecture ==
- Progress Energy Center for the Performing Arts, in Raleigh, North Carolina
- Progress Energy Park, a baseball stadium in St. Petersburg, Florida
- Progress Theatre, a theatre in Berkshire, England

== Arts, entertainment and media ==
=== Books ===
- Progress, an unfinished and unpublished book by Fran Lebowitz
- Progress: Ten Reasons to Look Forward to the Future, 2016 book by Johan Norberg

=== Music ===
==== Albums ====
- Progress (Big Youth album), 1979
- Progress (EP), an EP by Pedro the Lion
- Progress (Michael Giles album)
- Progress (Rx Bandits album), 2001
- Progress (Show-Ya album)
- Progress (Take That album)
- Progress (Ultraspank album)

==== Songs ====
- "Progress" (song), a 2011 song by Ayumi Hamasaki
- "Progress", a 1967 song by The Pretty Things recorded for Emotions
- "Progress", a 1980 song by Orchestral Manoeuvres in the Dark from Organisation
- "Progress", a 1984 song by Angelic Upstarts from Last Tango in Moscow
- "Progress", a 1984 song by Nik Kershaw included on The Best of Nik Kershaw
- "Progress", a 1987 song by Neurosis from Pain of Mind
- "Progress", a 1990 song by Midnight Oil from Essential Oils
- "Progress", a 2010 song by D'espairsRay from Monsters
- "Progress", a song by Kokua from "Progress" single (2006) and Progress album (2016)
- "Progress", a 2019 song by Psapp from Tourists

=== Other arts, entertainment and media ===
- "Progress" (Star Trek: Deep Space Nine), a TV series episode
- "Progress" (Agents of S.H.I.E.L.D.: Slingshot)
- Progress Wrestling, an English professional wrestling promotion
- Progress, a 1984 play by Doug Lucie

== Business ==
- Progress Energy, an American power generation and distribution company
- Progress Energy Resources, a Canadian subsidiary of Malaysian oil and gas company Petronas
- Progress Film, styled 'PROGRESS', a German film distributor
- Progress Publishers, a Moscow-based Soviet publisher
- Progress Software Corporation, the creator of Progress 4GL
- Progress State Research and Production Rocket Space Center, a Samara-based Russian space company
- Ivchenko-Progress, a Ukrainian aero-engine manufacturer

== Computer science ==
- Progress 4GL, now known as OpenEdge Advanced Business Language, a programming language developed by Progress Software
- Progress indicator, a component in a user interface to convey the progress of a task

== Geography ==
=== United States ===
- Progress, Indiana
- Progress, Mississippi
- Progress, Oregon
- Progress, Pennsylvania
- Progress, Texas
- Progress Village, Florida

=== Elsewhere ===
- Progress Station, Antarctica
- Rural Municipality of Progress No. 351, Saskatchewan, Canada
- Progress, Chüy, Kyrgyzstan
- Progress, Russia, several inhabited localities in Russia

== Politics and government ==
- Progress (organisation), a political organisation associated with the right wing of the British Labour Party
- Progress Party (disambiguation)
- Royal progress, a formal tour of the state by its monarch

== Transportation ==
- Progress (spacecraft), a Russian expendable unmanned freighter spacecraft
- Progress (train), which ran between Prague, Czechoslovakia, and the German Democratic Republic
- Progress D-27, a 1980s propfan engine developed in the USSR
- Progress, formerly known as Sea Serpent clippership (1850–1891, lost at sea)

== Other uses ==
- Progress (evolution), the idea that there is a largest-scale trend in evolution of organisms and that the trend is toward improvement or adaptation to changing environmental conditions
- PROGRESS (study), a trial study of perindopril and indapamide

== See also ==
- Progressed (EP), by Take That
- Progres (disambiguation)
