= PLP2 =

Protein-coding gene in the species Homo sapiens

Identifiers
- Aliases: PLP2, A4, A4LSB, proteolipid protein 2 (colonic epithelium-enriched), proteolipid protein 2
- External IDs: OMIM: 300112; MGI: 1298382; GeneCards: PLP2

Gene location (Human)
Chr.	X chromosome (human)
Band	Xp11.23	Start	49,171,898 bp
Band	Xp11.23	End	49,175,235 bp

Gene location (Mouse)
Chr.	X chromosome (mouse)
Band	X A1.1|X 3.45 cM	Start	7,534,180 bp
Band	X A1.1|X 3.45 cM	End	7,537,629 bp
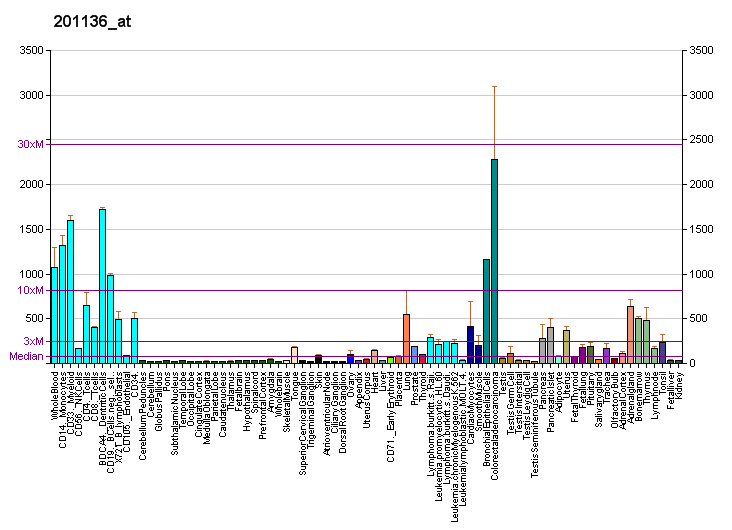
RNA expression pattern
Bgee	Human / Mouse (ortholog); Top expressed in: gingival epithelium; skin of abdomen; Descending thoracic aorta; mucosa of esophagus; skin of leg; right coronary artery; ascending aorta; nipple; popliteal artery; tibial arteries / Top expressed in: granulocyte; epidermis; cornea; corneal stroma; lactiferous gland; lip; skin of back; white adipose tissue; yolk sac; stomach; More reference expression data
BioGPS	More reference expression data
Gene ontology
Molecular function	ion transmembrane transporter activity; protein binding; chemokine binding
Cellular component	membrane; endoplasmic reticulum membrane; plasma membrane; endoplasmic reticulum; integral component of membrane
Biological process	cytokine-mediated signaling pathway; chemotaxis; ion transport; ion transmembrane transport
Sources:Amigo / QuickGO
Orthologs
Databases	NCBI: entry; OMA: entry
Species	Human	Mouse
Entrez	5355	18824
Ensembl	ENSG00000102007	ENSMUSG00000031146
UniProt	Q04941	Q9R1Q7
RefSeq (mRNA)	NM_002668	NM_019755
RefSeq (protein)	NP_002659; NP_002659.1	NP_062729
Location (UCSC)	Chr X: 49.17 – 49.18 Mb	Chr X: 7.53 – 7.54 Mb
PubMed search
- Wikidata
View/Edit Human	View/Edit Mouse

Proteolipid protein 2 is a protein that in humans is encoded by the PLP2 gene.
