= Koch–Ahom conflicts =

Date	1543–1571
Location	Assam
Result	Ahom victory

Belligerents
Ahom Kingdom	Koch dynasty

Commanders and leaders
Suhungmung; Suklenmung; Sukhaamphaa	Biswa Singha; Nara Narayan; Chilarai

The Koch–Ahom conflicts (1532–1571) refer to the diplomatic, strategic and military relationships between the Koch and the Ahom kingdoms over the control of the Brahmaputra Valley. Though an initial contact between the Ahoms and Koch occurred during Biswa Singha's reign, the relationship became belligerent with Nara Narayana ascending to power and consolidating his hold over the western portion of Assam; and it ended with the failure of Chilarai's campaign against Sulaiman Karrani. This was followed by an alliance that soon gave way to a fierce conflict between the Ahoms and the Mughals.

== Early contacts ==
Following the rout of Turbak by the Ahoms in about 1532, the Ahom army under Tonkham Buragohain pursued the remnant of the army and reached the Karatoya River; and after establishing a relationship with the Bengal Sultan confronted Biswa Singha, the Koch king, on the way back. Biswa Singha (r. 1515–1540), on the advice of his ministers, made peace and accepted the status of being a protectorate with an annual tribute of horses; and in return was gifted the land west of Sankosh the Ahoms had received as dowry from the Sultan.

Biswa Singha was initially regular in payments, but after having consolidated his newly established rule decided to invade the Ahom kingdom instead. In 1537 he advanced up to Singari, in Nagaon district, but had to give up his ambitions due to problems in supplying his forces—subsequently he and his brother attended the court of Suhungmung in the winter of that year.

== Koch and Ahom successions ==
Biswa Singha died some time after visiting the court of Suhungmung, and his son Nara Narayan established himself a few years later after a probable succession battle with another son named Nara Singha. Following the example of his father, Nara Narayan was assisted by his brother Sukladhwaj (also Chilarai) who was the Diwan (prime minister) as well as the commander-in-chief of the Koch army.

There was a succession issue in the Ahom kingdom as well when Suhungmung was assassinated in 1539 in a conspiracy hatched by his son Suklenmung who succeeded him.

== Conflicts ==
=== Initial skirmishes ===
In 1543, Suklenmung drove away the Koch garrison guarding the eastern frontier of Koch kingdom at the north bank of Brahmaputra to Sola. Soon after, three Koch princes, with a view of revenge, captured a boat belonging to an Ahom officer. A battle ensued, compelling the Ahoms to retreat. The renewal of hostilities in 1546 costed the lives of those three Koch princes and Naranarayan launched an expedition against the Ahom kingdom.

=== Battle of Pichala fort ===
The Koches initially gained victory but soon were overturned by the Ahoms. After the completion of Gohain Kamal Ali (Note: Gohain Kamal Ali, an embanked road covering a distance of 350 miles stretching from Koch Behar to Narayanpur.) in 1547, a fort was erected at Narayanpur. An attack was made by the Koches on the Ahoms encamping at Pichala fort, resulting in a disastrous defeat of the Koches with heavy losses. This battle is known Pichalapariya ran. Thence Ahoms recovered all their lost tracts on their western frontier.

=== Alliance attempts and occupation of Ahom capital ===
Following this, there was a lull in the conflicts. Naranarayan realized the need for friendship, and envoys were sent to the Ahom court in June–July, 1555. He himself wrote a letter to then Ahom king Sukhampha (r. 1552–1603) about his desire for cordial relations. Ahoms didn't accord the Koches any warm messages but were rather disparaging. (Note: The Bargohain, who received the envoys at Garhgaon firmly and curtly told them incidents, which were natural among Kshatriyas, i.e., in war. The Gohain not only criticized their etiquette but disparaged the Koch manners and customs.) Conflicts were renewed in 1562. The Koches under the command of Shukladhwaja alias Chilarai marched against the Ahoms at the head of 60 thousand soldiers. Two prolonged invasions at both land and water were arranged. The Koch army on their way was joined by the Bhutias, Daflas and Bhuyans. They advancing army finally encamped near Jaria in Habung. Sukhampha aware of the religiosity of the Koches and their aversion from killing Brahmanas, sent his soldiers disguised as Brahmanas. The Koch soldiers withdrew at this sight, soon this stratagem was understood. In the meantime, the Koch fleet occupied Sala and Makaland and proceeded to Dikhowmukh. At several engagements, the Ahoms were routed. The Ahom king alarmed by the continuous setback, took flight for Charaikhorong in Naga Hills. This demoralized the common people, including many nobles and some Ahom princes joined the Koches. Meanwhile, Garhgaon (the Ahom capital) was also occupied.

=== Final conflicts ===
The Ahom king was compelled to make peace negotiations with the Koch king. Envoys were sent and the treaty of Majuli was concluded. The conditions of that treaty were fulfilled in July–August, 1563 and the Koches withdrew. Soon after, Ahoms adopted extensive preparations and vigorous measures to recover all the lost territories. On the contrary, the Koches too found it difficult to maintain overlordship over Ahoms by using force and arms. The Ahom counter-retaliation was met by a fresh Koch expedition. The Koch fleet under Tepu Barua was routed in 1565. In December–January 1571, the final Koch expedition was repulsed at Dhansiri.

== Bibliography ==
- Nath, D (1989), History of the Koch Kingdom: 1515-1615, Delhi: Mittal Publications
- Sarkar, J. N. (1992), "Early Rulers of Koch Bihar", in Barpujari, H. K. (ed.), The Comprehensive History of Assam, vol. 2, Guwahati: Assam Publication Board, pp. 69–89
- Baruah, S.L. (1985), A Comprehensive History of Assam, Munshiram Manoharlal
- Devi, Lakshmi (1968). Ahom-tribal Relations- A Political Study. Lawyer's Book Stall. pp. 210–261.
- Barman, R. P. (2007), From tribalism to state : reflections on the emergence of Koch Kingdom (early fifteenth century to 1773), Delhi: Abhijeet publications
