= Gohain Kamal Ali =

Road in Cooch Beher, West Bengal

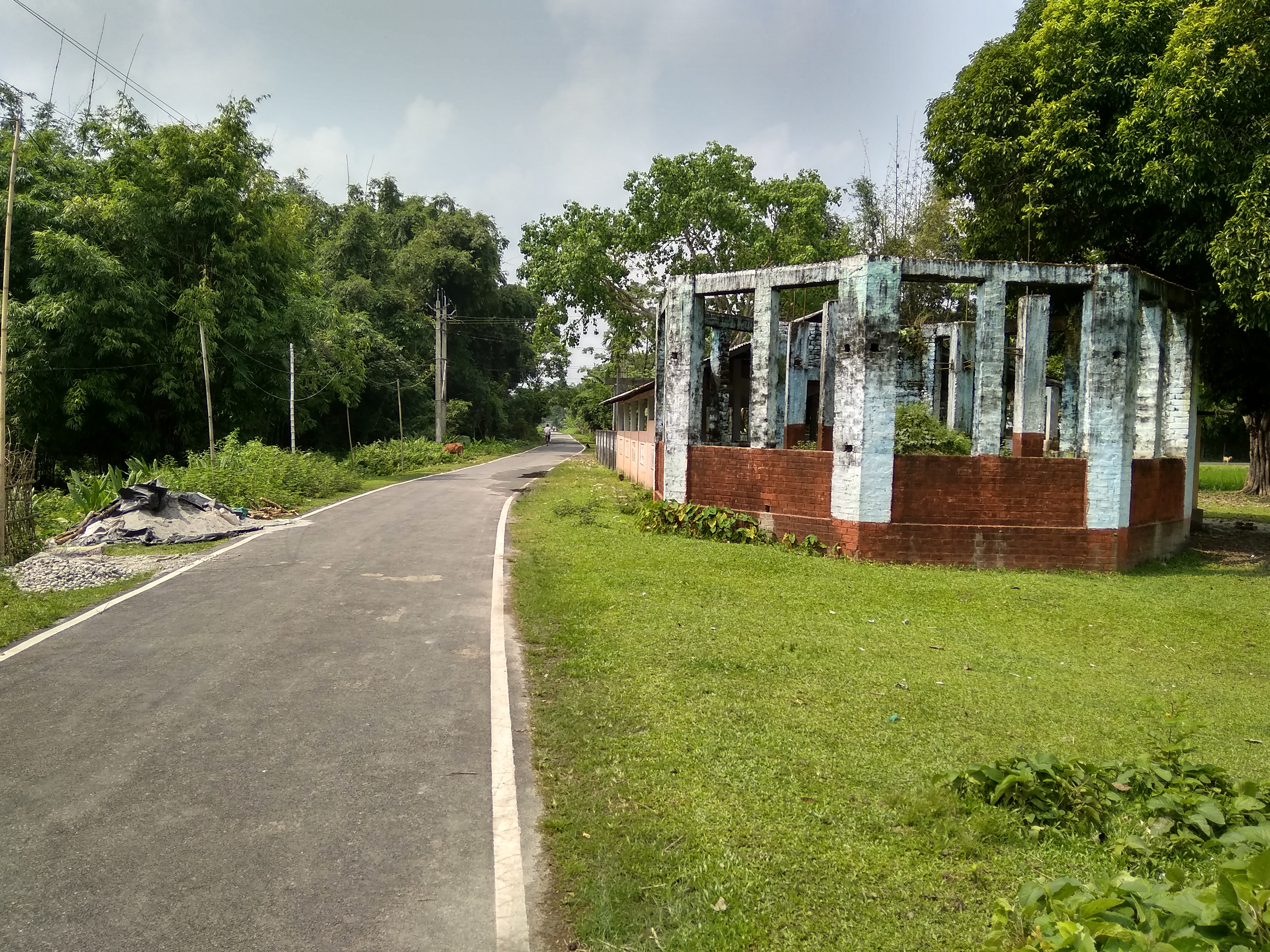
A section of Gohain Kamal Ali today

Gohain Kamal Ali was an embanked road that connected the capital of the Koch dynasty, Cooch Behar in North Bengal to the heart of Agomani in Dhubri and Narayanpur in Lakhimpur district in Assam, and ran along the foot of the Bhutan hills and the Dafla (Nishi) hills. This was constructed under the supervision of Gohain Kamal, the step-brother of the king, Nara Narayan and was completed in 1547. This was the road that the Koch general Chilarai used soon after for his invasion of the Ahom kingdom, and attacked the Ahom fort at Pichala, which was not a success, but a later movement in 1562 was greatly successful.

In 1562 Nara Narayan encamped at Chandikabehar, Mangaldai, he demarcated the region north of the road as where the Koch and the Mech people were to follow their tribal customs, and the region south where Brahminic rites were to be followed.

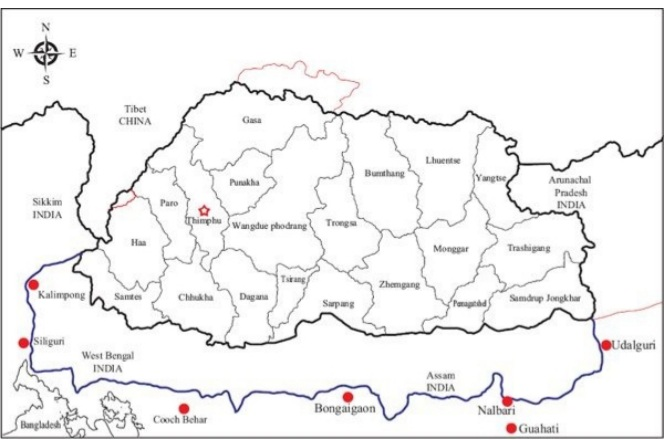
Southern boundary of Bhutan in blue before the Duar War of 1865

From the early 17th century, the Kingdom of Bhutan pushed south and took control of the fertile plains down to Gohain Kamal Ali road. Ahom King Gaurinath Singha (1780–1795) had fixed this road as the northern boundary of Darrang. The Kingdom of Bhutan controlled the Duars of Koch Hajo and Koch Behar north of Gohain Kamal Ali under the jurisdiction of Trongsa Penlop and Paro Penlop, till the Duar Wars in 1865 when the British removed the Bhutanese influence from the Duars under the Treaty of Sinchula and the Eastern Duars, Kamrup Duars, Darrang Duars were merged with Goalpara, Kamrup, Darrang district of Assam and the Western Dooars to Jalpaiguri district of West Bengal and later to the Indian Union in 1949.
