= Nara Narayan =

Koch king from 1554 to 1587

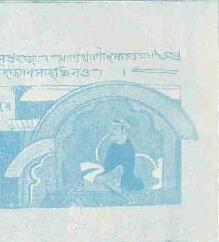
- Naranaryan seating on the throne, from the manuscript painting of Darrang Raj Vamsavali c.18th century

Koch king
- Reign: 1554–1587
- Predecessor: Biswa Singha
- Successor: Lakshminarayan
- Died: 1587
- Dynasty: Koch dynasty
- Father: Biswa Singha

Naranarayan (died 1587) was the king of the Koch dynasty from 1554 until his death in 1587. was the last ruler of the undivided Koch dynasty of the Kamata Kingdom. He succeeded his father, Biswa Singha. Under him the Koch kingdom reached its cultural and political zenith. Under his rule, and under the military command of his brother Chilarai, he was able to subjugate the entire Brahmaputra Valley, including the Ahom kingdom; besides the Kachari, Tripura kingdoms, as well as the Khyrem, Jaintia and others. This influence was halted when he faced Suleman Karranni, the Sultan of Bengal.

He introduced a silver coin, called the Narayani, that greatly influenced the numismatics of Assam.

== Ascension ==
At the time of his father's death, Naranaryan and his step brother, Chilarai, were in Varanasi and another brother, Nara Singha, succeed the throne. Malladev, as he was then known, hastened back with Chilarai and with the help of their supporters among the courtier, took over the throne. Nara Singha was pursued, who escaped first to the Morung kingdom, and thence to Nepal and finally Kashmir.

Malladev ascended the throne in 1540, in the same year that his father had died, and acquired the title Narayana, which was to become the dynastic title of his succeeding kings. He issued coins, and his seal was made. He appointed his step-brother Chilarai (then known as Sukladhwaj) the yuvaraj (somewhat akin to "prime minister") and the commander-in-chief of the military.

== Kingdom expansion ==
The Koch kingdom was a tributary the eastern Ahom kingdom and soon after his ascension began preparing to throw off the vassalage. A border tiff at Sala, just above Kaliabor escalated in 1546 with three step-brothers forging ahead into the Ahom kingdom, to meet with their deaths. After a series of battles with varying fortunes, the Koch army was defeated by the Ahoms, then under Suklenmung (1539–1552) who personally led the military, at the Battle of Pichala in 1547. This was followed by a period of calm and preparation.

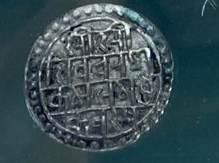
Coin of Nara Narayan

=== Preparations ===
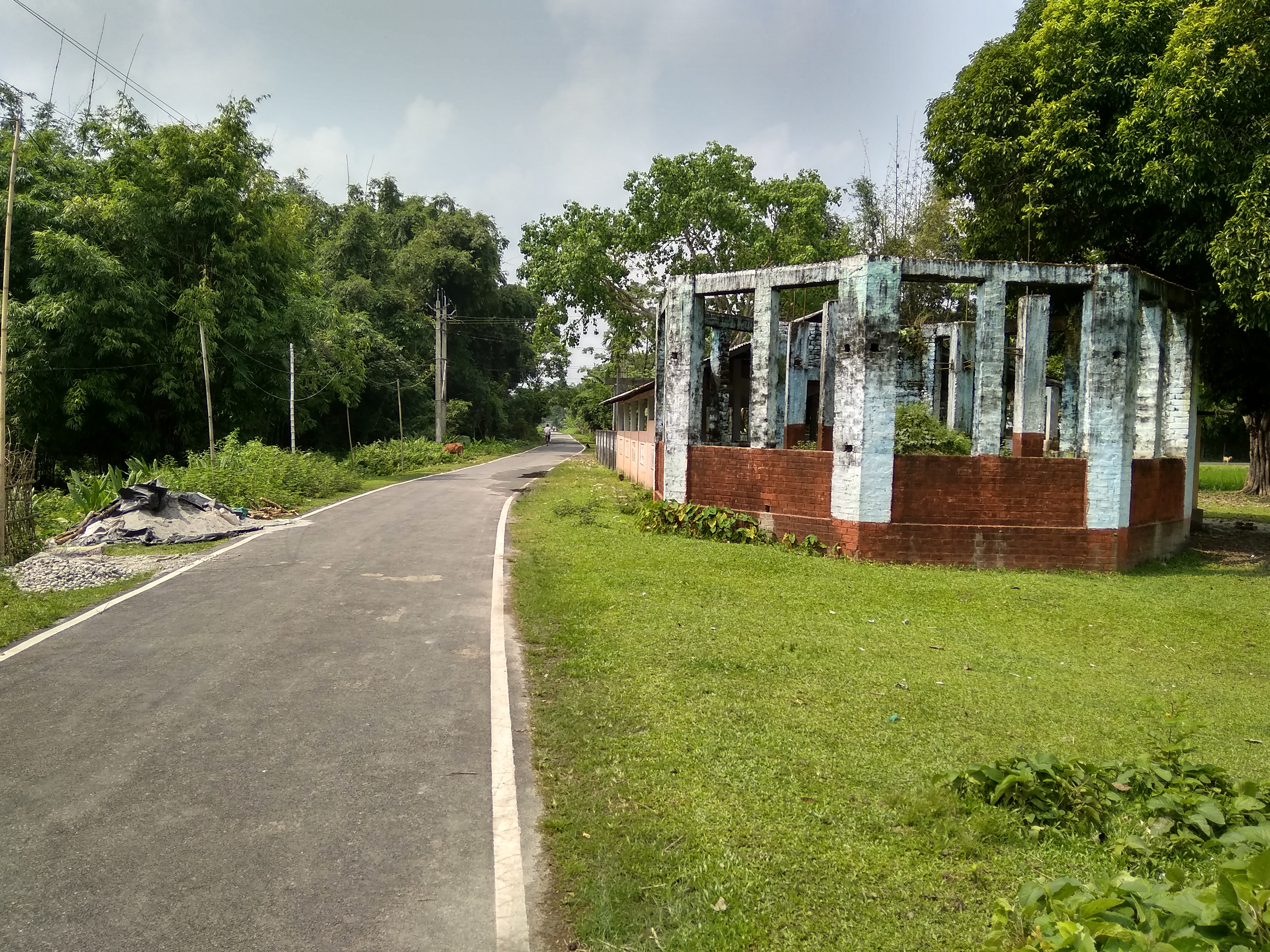
A section of Gohain Kamal Ali

The preparations for a push east was made slowly and deliberately. After the reverses of Biswa Singha in 1537 due to logistics, and his own in 1547, he made calculated moves. He sent a diplomatic mission in 1555 to court of the new Ahom king Sukhaamphaa (1552–1603) to gather information about its state. Nara Narayan had his step-brother, Kamal Narayan, surreptitious lay a road (called Gohain Kamal Ali) along the foothills of the eastern Himalayas from the capital to the eastern frontier. He consolidated his alliance with the tribal groups, with the help of whom his father had established the kingdom and decreed that their religious practice should prevail north of the Gohain Kamal Ali. He also was able to receive the alliance of the Bhuyans, who were inimical to his father, Biswa Singha. Finally, in the later part of 1562 Chilarai, the commander, marched at the head of a 60,000 strong force, with Naranarayan at the rear. And as he marched, he obtained the support of the Meches, Kacharis, Bhutiyas, Daflas, Bhuyans and Brahmins and reached Barnadi. Some princes of the erstwhile Chutiya kingdom also submitted their support. Naranarayan forced his way strongly into the Ahom kingdom, and set up camp at Majuli.

=== Conquests ===
By April 1563 the Ahom king Sukhaamphaa had to abandon his capital, which was then occupied by the Koch army. The Treaty of Majuli was settled, which established Koch hegemony in the Brahmaputra valley and extended the boundary in the east to Narayanpur. On the way back, Chilarai halted at Maibang, where the Kachari king, Durlabhnarayan (1525–1580), submitted without a fight.

This was followed by the submission of the Manipuri king. The Jaintia king gave fight and was slain, and his son was established as king. Chilarai also campaigned against the Tippera kingdom. According to J. B. Bhattacharjee, the Cachar plains, then under Tripura, were brought under Koch control during Chilarai's campaign, and a Koch principality was established at Brahmapur, later known as Khaspur, where Gohain Kamal (Kamal Narayan) was appointed governor. At Langai, an account places the death of the Tripura king Ananta Manikya along with 18,000 of his soldiers and the installation of his brother on the throne, although the authenticity of this account is highly doubted by scholars.

Next, the Khairam raja, a Khasi chief of Nongkhrem, submitted. Chilarai found a tougher foe in the Governor of Sylhet, allied with Suleiman Karrani, then engaged in an expedition in Odisha; but he was killed after a prolonged three-day battle via a stratagem, and his brother was installed after tribute was extracted from him. The two brothers then returned to their capital via Dimarua and Raha.

== Hinduisation under Nara Narayan ==
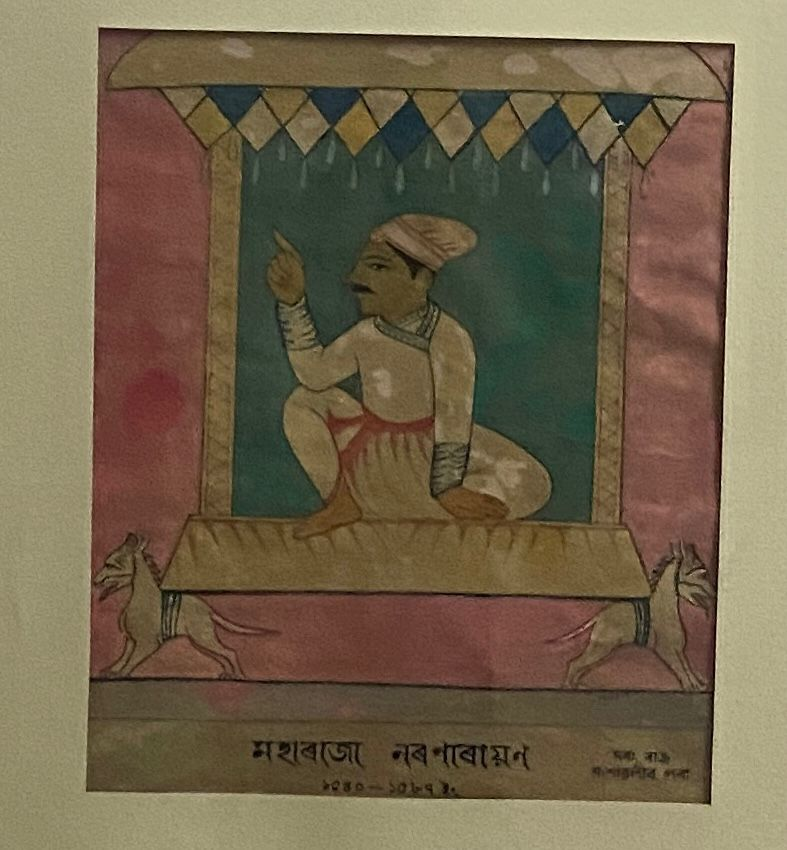
Portrait of Nara Narayan

During the reign of Nara Narayan, varnasrama or fourfold caste system was introduced in Koch Behar by a Brahmin priest named Siddhantavagisa. This event was followed by the advent of Srimanta Sankardeva, along with his two disciples Madhavdeva and Damodardev in the mid 16th-century which accelerated the sankritisation of Koch royal family from their tribal belief system. However, the introduction of this new religion and varna system came in direct conflict with the old tribal belief system of the Koch, Mech and Kachari people of the Koch-Kamata kingdom. This led to Naranarayan issue an official order to recognise the religious practices of the different groups residing in the area.

The Jaintia king Jaso Manik (1606–1641 A.D.) had married Lakshmi Narayana, the daughter of the Hindu Koch king Nara Narayana. It is believed that it was his wife Lakshmi Narayana who have influenced the Jaintia Royalty King Jaso Manik and his tribe to embrace Shakti sect of Hinduism as she herself was an ardent devotee of Goddess Durga.

== Division of the kingdom ==
In 1581 Raghu Deva, the son of his brother Shukladhvaj became the de facto ruler of the eastern part of his kingdom Koch Hajo, though under suzerainty of his uncle. After the death of Nara Narayan, he declared his independence.

Nara Narayan's son Lakshmi Narayan succeeded him after his death, but only inherited the western part of his kingdom Koch Bihar. On 23 December 1596 Man Singh I married Nara Narayan's daughter Kshamadevi.

== Translation of Puranic text ==
Naranarayan employed eminent scholars and poets to translate the Bhagavad Gita, the Puranas, and the Mahabharata into Assamese, and to compile the treatise on arithmetic, astronomy, and grammar. The laborious works of the scholars were widely circulated among the people of the country as a result of which even women and Shudras became learned

== Notes ==
Nara Narayan Koch Dynasty
Regnal titles
Preceded by Vishwasingha	Maharaja of Kamata	Succeeded by Lakshminarayan
