= Sukhampha =

Ahom king from 1552 to 1603

Sukhaamphaa
- Chaopha Swargadeo of Ahom Kingdom

Ahom King
- Reign: 1552–1603
- Predecessor: Suklenmung
- Successor: Susenghphaa
- Born: Ahom kingdom
- Died: 1603; Ahom kingdom
- Issue: Susenghphaa
Names
- Khora Roja Sukhaamphaa
- Dynasty: Ahom dynasty
- Father: Suklenmung
- Religion: Ahom religion

Sukhampha (died 1603) was a king of the Ahom kingdom of medieval Assam. He ruled for a period of fifty one years, the longest in the Ahom dynasty. Very fond of sports, he fell off an elephant soon after his ascension and the injury gave him a limp, and as a result the Buranjis often called him the Khora roja.

== Ascension and general rule ==
Sukhampha became the king of the Ahom kingdom after his father, Suklenmung, died.

He was particularly fond of sports and personally took part in elephant catching expeditions (khedda). Unlike during his father's rule when Sankardev and Madhavdev had to flee the kingdom, the disciples of Madhavdev could come and establish centers of Ekasarana Dharma and it was during Sukhampha's reign that the religion took firm root and began to flourish. Many common folks as well as high officials of the kingdom took initiation in this religion, a development with remarkable consequences.

== Wars ==
=== With the Koch ===
A dispute in 1562 with the Koch kingdom led to a full-fledged invasion in January 1563 by the Koch general Chilarai. Aikhek, the Burhagohain who was the commander of the Ahom military, offered ineffectual opposition, and Chilarai was able to quickly occupy the Ahom capital Garhgaon. Sukhampha fled to Namrup, which one of his successors, Sutamla, would be forced to do once again when Mir Jumla II occupies the capital hundred years later.

Peace negotiations began that year itself, and Chilarai agreed to hand back the capital in return for a large tract of land in the north bank of Brahmaputra River, sons of nobles for hostage and riches in gold, silver and fabric, as agreed upon in the Treaty of Majuli. Sukhampha came back to the capital, and in the inquiry into the cause of defeat that followed, Aikhek was removed from the office the Burhagohain and replaced by Chaopet (Kankham). In due course, the Ahoms could recover Narayanpur, and up to Sala; and Nara Narayana, the Koch king, who was facing aggression from Bengal, released the hostages to ease relations with the Ahoms.

=== With others ===
Sukhampha's long reign saw much other belligerence, but which did not alter the status quo much, or put him in as much distress as the Koch invasion did. Among many minor offensives from the Chutia people, the most important conflict was with the Nara king of Mungkang, when he invaded the Ahom territory of Khamjang across the Patkai. This led to further belligerence in 1576, that finally led to the Nara army defeating the Ahoms in Namrup and reaching the Sesa river, when the Ahom could finally push them back.

== Death ==
Sukhampha died of natural causes in 1603 at Khowang and his son Susenghpha became the new Swargadeo.
