= Treaty of Majuli =

1563 treaty between Ahom and Koch

The Treaty of Majuli (1563) was settled between the Koch king Nara Narayan and the Ahom king Sukhaamphaa. The treaty followed a successful campaign against the Ahom kingdom led by Chilarai, the general of the Koch forces and the brother of the king, which resulted in the fall of Garhgaon, the Ahom capital. The fall of the capital resulted in the Ahom kings flight, as well as treason by high Ahom officials including the kings own brother. The Ahom king sued for peace via his emissary, Aikhek Burhagohain. During the peace negotiations Nara Narayan was camped at Majuli. The terms that were finally settled on were:

1. The Ahom king would accept Koch overlordship.
2. The land on the North bank of the Brahmaputra to the west of Subansiri river were to be ceded to the Koch
3. Five sons of Ahom nobles were to be handed over as hostage.
4. Hand over the elephant Khamring and the horse Paksirai
5. The Ahoms were to pay a war indemnity—60 elephants, 60 pieces of clothes, 60 maidens, 300 men, a red royal standard along with gold and silver.

Furthermore, the Koch king stationed three Koch officers as rajkhowas—Ujir Bamun, Tapasvi Laskar and Malamulya Laskar—as well as a garrison at Narayanpur to administer the newly acquired region.
