= Koch coinage =

Koch Kingdom (1555 to 1866)

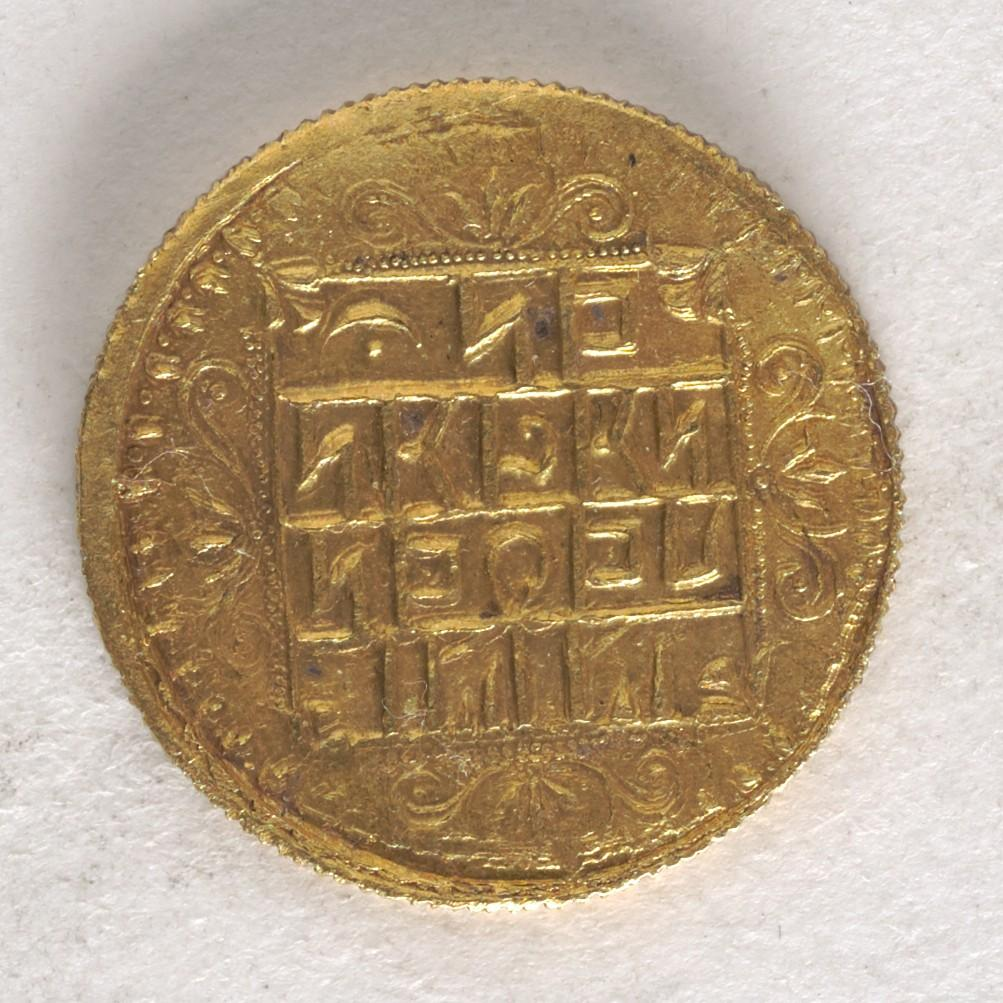
Gold mohur of Koch king Narendra Narayan (1847–1863)

Koch coinage or Coins of Koch dynasty, originally called Narayani Mudra, were issued from 1555 to 1866 under the Koch Kingdom. It was first introduced by the Koch king Nara Narayan (r. 1544–1587) in the year of his accession in 1555 A.D or Saka 1477. Both gold and silver coins were impressed. These Narayani coins prevailed over other neighboring kingdoms of Northeast India and North Bengal during this period. Narayani coins were also the medium of trade in some northeastern kingdoms and tribal chiefdoms with Northeast Asia. From 1866, onwards the circulation of Narayani coins was ceased by the British government. However, on a few instances after 1866, commemorative coins were impressed for the Raja of Cooch Behar on the day of his ascendancy.

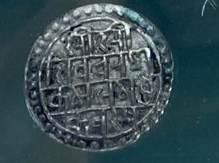
Koch Narayani

The term "Narayani coins" is derived from the name Nara Narayan (1554–1587) the last ruler of the undivided Koch dynasty but according to other sources, the term might be derived from Narayan, the royal deity of the Koch kings. Raghudeva, the son of Chilarai who assumed his full independence over the area between the Sankosh River and the Bhareli River that came to known as Koch Hajo struck his own coins. However, this independence was short lived but the area west of the Sankosh River known as Koch Behar remained in existence until 1949 and continued issuing coins till very late.
