= Madhabdev University =

University in Assam, India

Coordinates: 26.9676°N 93.8707°E

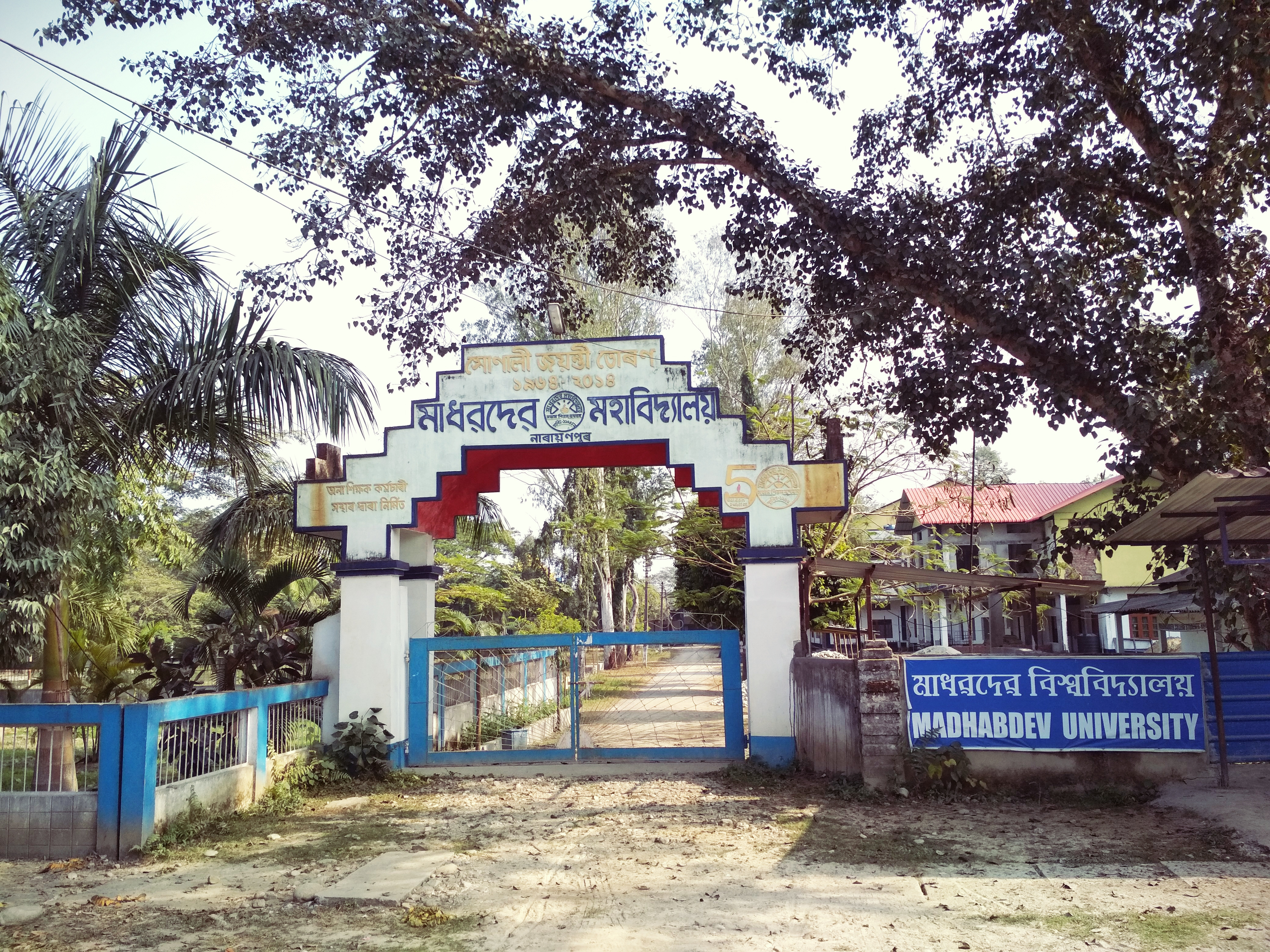
- Madhabdev University Entrance Gate
- Motto in English: सत्यम शिवम सुन्दरम (The Truth, The God and The Beauty)
- Type: Public
- Established: 2019 (7 years ago)
- Affiliations: UGC
- Chancellor: Governor of Assam
- Vice-Chancellor: Arupjyoti Chowdhury
- Location: Narayanpur, North Lakhimpur, Assam, India
- Campus: Rural
- Website: madhabdevuniversity.ac.in

Madhabdev University is a public state university located in Narayanpur, Assam. The university is established by The Assam Act No. XXXV of 2017 which was passed by the Government of Assam on 7 September 2017. It was created by upgrading Madhavdev College of Narayanpur, North Lakhimpur.

It was named after Sri Sri Madhavdev, an important preceptor of the Ekasarana Dharma known for his loyalty to his guru, Srimanta Sankardev.

== Campus ==
The Madhabdev University campus is located in Narayanpur, Assam. The campus is equipped with academic buildings, laboratories, libraries, and administrative offices.

In addition to educational facilities, the campus offers residential accommodations for students and staff, recreational spaces, and sports facilities.

The campus also houses facilities for research and innovation.

== Vice-Chancellors ==
The following are the Vice-Chancellors of Madhabdev University. The current Vice-Chancellor is Prof. Arupjyoti Choudhury.

Sl. No.	Vice-Chancellor Name	Role	Tenure
1	Prof. Dibakar Chandra Deka	First Vice-Chancellor	14/06/2019-30/04/2023
2	Prof. Nirode Boruah	Acting Vice-Chancellor (In-charge)	11/05/2023-19/02/2024
3	Dr. Arupjyoti Choudhury	Second Vice-Chancellor	19/02/2024 – Present

== Registrars ==
The following are the registrars of Madhabdev University. The current Registrar is Dr. Khirapada Dutta.

Sl. No.	Name	Role	Tenure
1	Dr. Sarat Hazarika	First Registrar	__/__/2019 – 31/01/2024
2	Dr. Khirapada Dutta	Acting Registrar (In-Charge)	01/02/2024 – 26/09/2024
3	Dr. Khirapada Dutta	Second Registrar	27/09/2024 – Present

== Affiliated colleges ==
The university has jurisdiction over some colleges in Biswanath district, Lakhimpur district.

=== Biswanath District ===
Chatia College, Sootea

Behali Degree College, Sukan Suti

PDUAM, Behali, Ratowa

Kalabari College, Kalabari

=== Lakhimpur District ===
Bihpuria College, Bihpuria

Kherajkhat College, Deotola

Sankardev Mahavidyalaya, Pathali Pathar

Pub Dikrong College, Lahalial

Laluk College, Mencha

Nowboicha College, Bilotia Gaon

== History ==
The first meeting for the establishment of the college was held on 24 November 1963 at Madhavpur Higher Primary School near Narayanpur town and in 1964 the college was established as Narayanpur College. The first president was Kamal Gogoi and the founding secretary was the freedom fighter Purnananda Dutta . The first ad hoc management committee of the college was formed on 1 July of that year. In the first year, there were 75 students and 5 teachers in the departments of English, Assamese, Political Science, History and Economics The college was renamed as Madhavdev College on 2 August 1966.

In 1964, Gauhati University and in 1965, Dibrugarh University accredited the pre-university class. The college received its graduation course from Dibrugarh University in 1967. The Science Branch was started in 1978.

MDU was the first university in Assam to introduce the FYUGP, back in 2022–23, ahead of other universities.”

== Courses ==
- Academic Programmes

The University provides Four-Year Undergraduate Programmes (FYUGP) through its academic departments and affiliated colleges, in accordance with the National Education Policy (NEP) 2020 framework.

Postgraduate Programmes are offered exclusively through the academic departments of the University.

- Research Programmes

Madhabdev University offers Doctor of Philosophy (Ph.D.) programmes, conducted solely on the University campus, to promote innovative research and scholarly contributions.

== Admission ==
Undergraduate Programmes:

Admissions to the Four-Year Undergraduate Programmes (FYUGP) are generally based on candidates’ performance in the Higher Secondary (10+2) Examination and the Common University Entrance Test (CUET-UG). Eligible students are admitted to various academic departments of the University as well as its affiliated colleges.

Postgraduate Programmes:

The Madhabdev University Post Graduate Entrance Test (MDUPGET) has been conducted since 2023 for admission into Postgraduate Programmes offered by the academic departments of the University.

Doctoral Programmes:

Admission to the Doctor of Philosophy (Ph.D.) programmes is based on performance in the Madhabdev University Research Entrance Test (MDURET). The admission process is carried out in accordance with the regulations and guidelines prescribed by the University Grants Commission (UGC).

== Departments under the Faculty of Language and Literature ==
ASSAMESE

ENGLISH

Programs Availability in the Departments under the Faculty of Language and Literature
Department Name	BA	MA	PhD
Assamese	✔	✔	✔
English	✔	✔	✔

== Departments under the Faculty of Humanities and Social Sciences ==
ECONOMICS

HISTORY

PHILOSOPHY

POLITICAL SCIENCE

SOCIOLOGY

Programs Availability in the Departments under the Faculty of Humanities and Social Sciences
Department Name	BA	MA	PhD
Economics	✔	✔	✔
History	✔	✔	✔
Philosophy	✔	✔	✔
Political Science	✔	✔	✔
Sociology	✔	✔	✔

== Departments under the Faculty of Education ==
EDUCATION

Programs Availability in the Departments under the Faculty of Education
Department Name	BA	MA	PhD
Education	✔	✔	✔

== Departments under the Faculty of Chemical Sciences ==
CHEMISTRY

    • Specializations :

    •Inorganic Chemistry
    •Organic Chemistry
    •Physical Chemistry

Prograsms Availability in the Departments under the Faculty of Chemical Sciences
Department Name	BSc	MSc	PhD
Chemistry	✔	✔	✔

== Departments under the Faculty of Physical and Mathematical Sciences ==
MATHEMATICS

PHYSICS

Programs Availability in the Departments under the Faculty of Physical and Mathematical Sciences
Department Name	BSc	MSc	PhD
Mathematics	✔	✔	✔
Physics	✔	✔	✔

== Departments under the Faculty of Natural and Biological Sciences ==
BOTANY

ZOOLOGY

Programs Availability in the Departments under the Faculty of Natural and Biological Sciences
Department Name	BSc	MSc	PhD
Botany	✔	✔	✔
Zoology	✔	✔	✔

== Departments under the Faculty of Library and Information Sciences ==
Library and Information Science

Programs Availability in the Departments under the Faculty of Library and Information Sciences
Department Name	PhD
Library and Information Science	✔

== Convocations ==
Convocation No.	Date	Chief Guest	Chancellor
1st Convocation	2 April 2025	Prof. (Dr.) Anil D. Sahasrabudhe	Shri Lakshman Prasad Acharya (Hon’ble Governor of Assam)
2nd Convocation	—	—	—
3rd Convocation	—	—	—
4th Convocation	—	—	—
5th Convocation	—	—	—
