= Prasanna Deb Raikut =

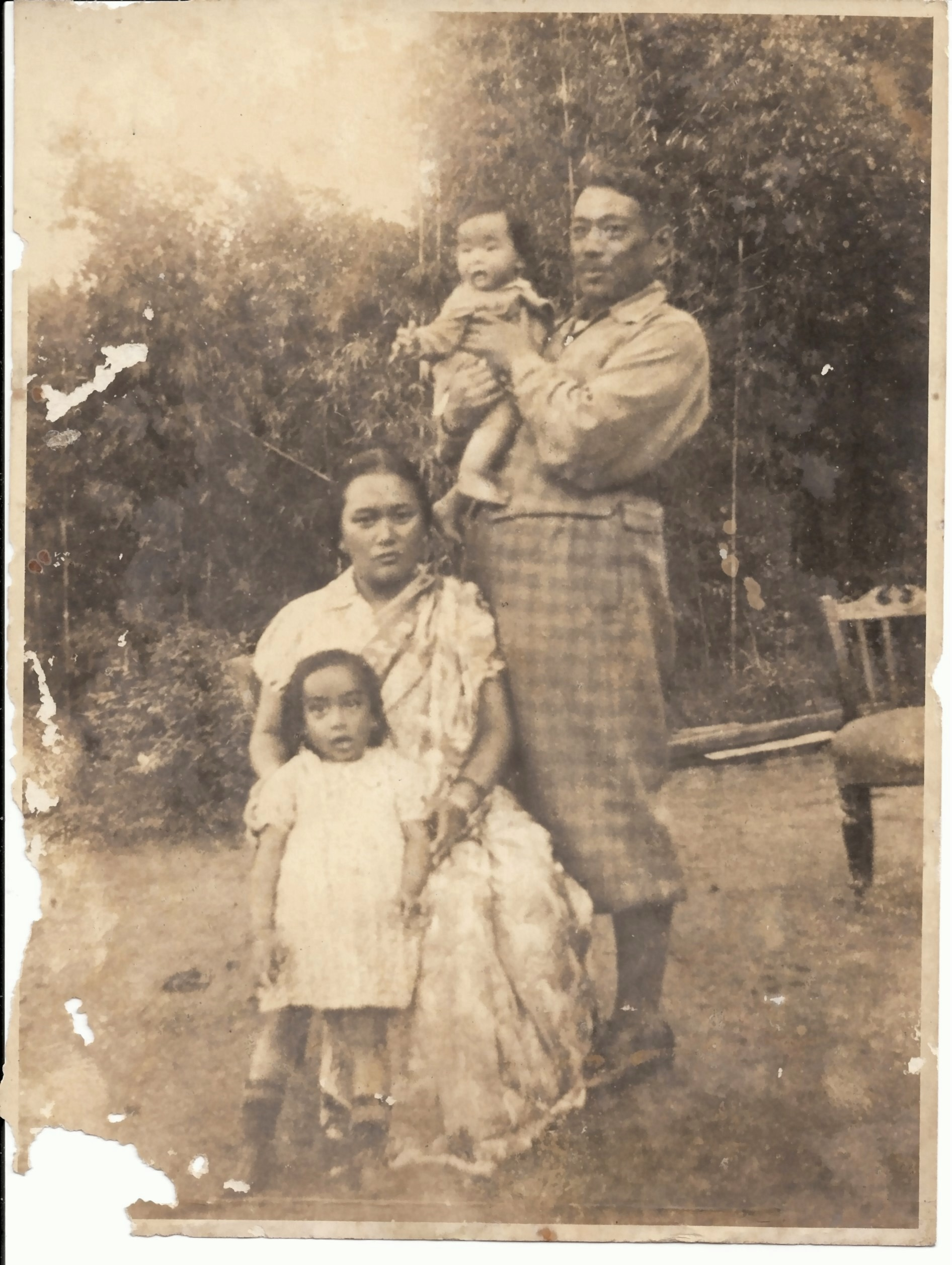
Family Prasanna D.Raikut

Prasana Deb Raikut was the Forest and Excise Minister in the A. K. Fazlul Huq cabinet.

== Career ==
Raikut was born in the Raikat family.

Raikut was elected to the Bengal Legislative Assembly as a scheduled caste candidate. He later represented the Rajbanshi people.
