= Raikat =

Princely family in Jalpaiguri, West Bengal, India

Raja Prasanna Dev Raikat and Rani Deela Devi of the Raikat family of Cooch Bihar in Darjeeling

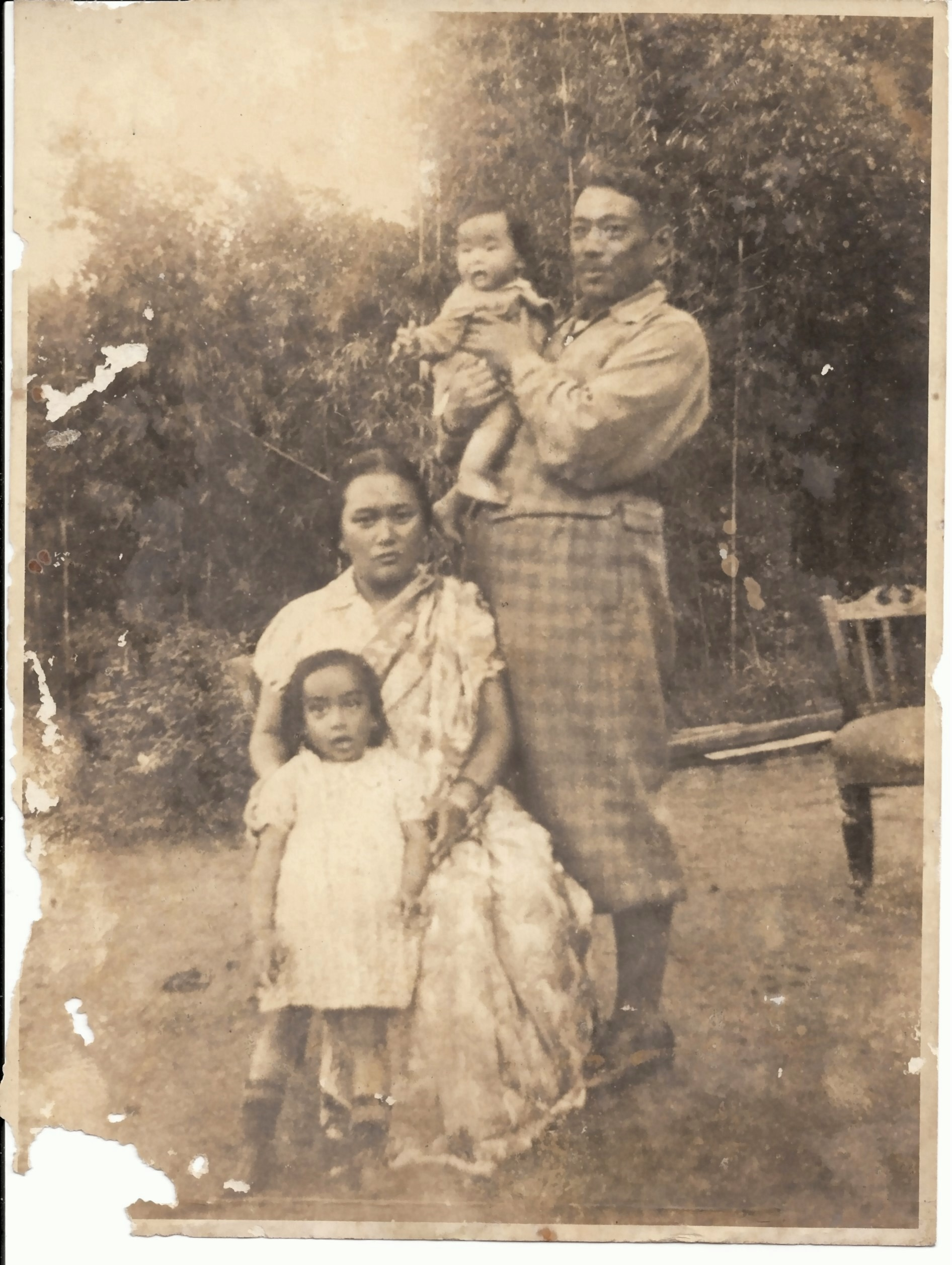
Raja Prasanna Dev Raikat with family.

The Raikut family was a princely family that controlled large estates in Jalpaiguri what is now West Bengal, India, first as subjects to the state of Koch Bihar, later as Zamindars to the Mughal rulers of Bengal, and then to British Raj. Their story parallels that of the Bardhaman Raj, from the same region.

== Origins: Koch Bihar ==
The Raikut family is a collateral branch of Koch dynasty which took control of the Kamata Kingdom in 1515. The family founder was Sisya Singha (earlier known as Sisu), brother of Biswa Singha who established the Koch dynasty. Sisya Singha held the umbrella during Biswa Singha's coronation and was made the Raikut (lit: chieftain of the fortress) and commander-in-chief of the Koch army. He was given the region called Vaikunthapur (present-day Jalpaiguri district) as appanage. He established his seat at Siliaguri or Silikhaguri (modern-day Siliguri).

The seat of the Raikut family was shifted to the present site in Jalpaiguri city by Jayanto Deb Raikat, who ruled during the years 1793–1800. The big pond which exits today near the palace was excavated at the time of Sarva Dev, who ruled from 1800 to 1847.

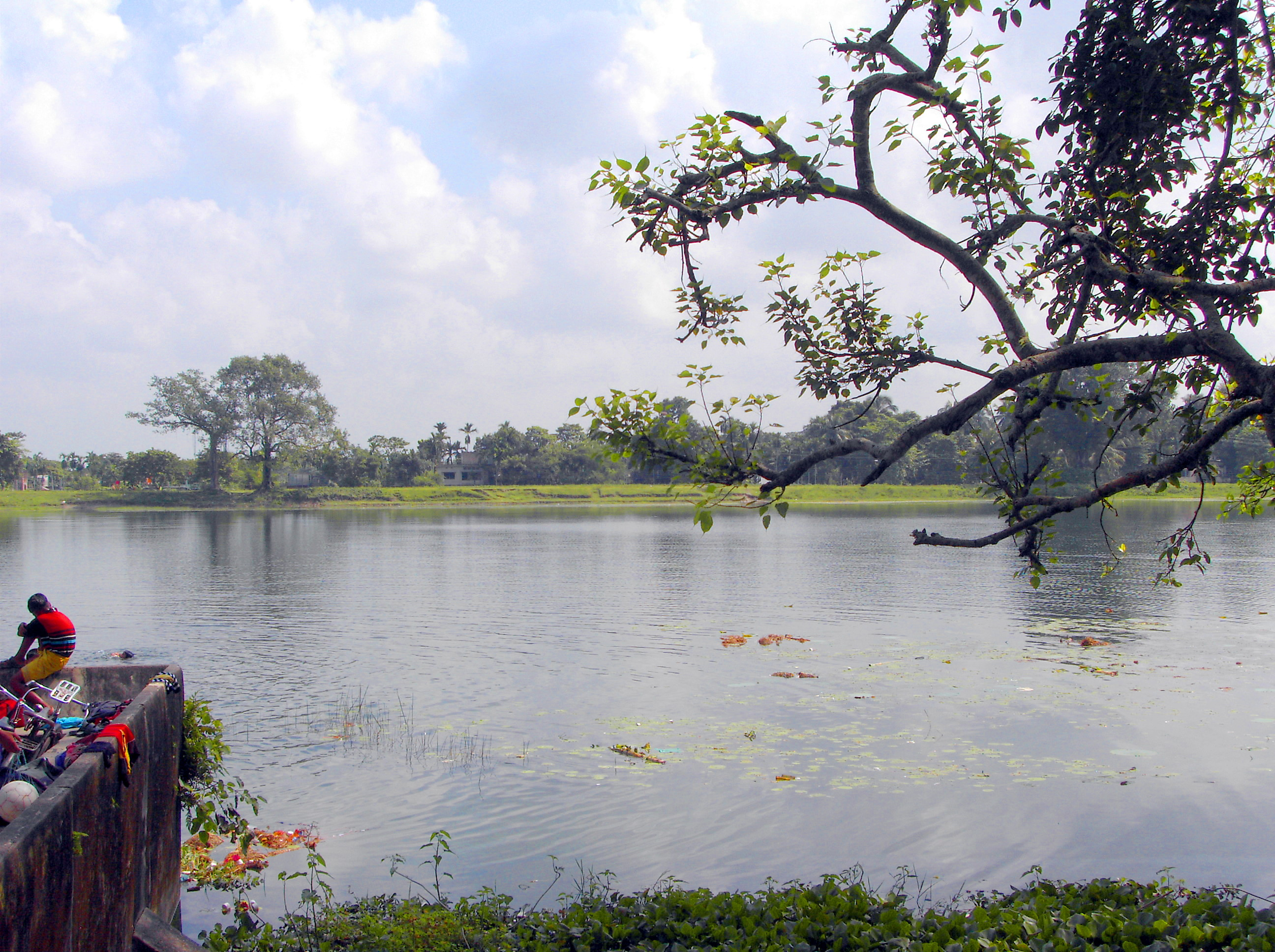
The large pond, near the Palace.

Baikunthopur Estate was not included in any Sarkar of Muslim division of the country. Although some accounts say that it transferred its allegiance to them and agreed to pay a nominal tribute. This is said to have signed in 1682 at the time of Svja Khan. After the Battle of Plassey, the Dewani of Bengal, Bihar and Odisha came under East India Company in 1765. This estate was then temporarily included in the Dewani, placed under Rangpur District and received the benefit of permanent settlement.

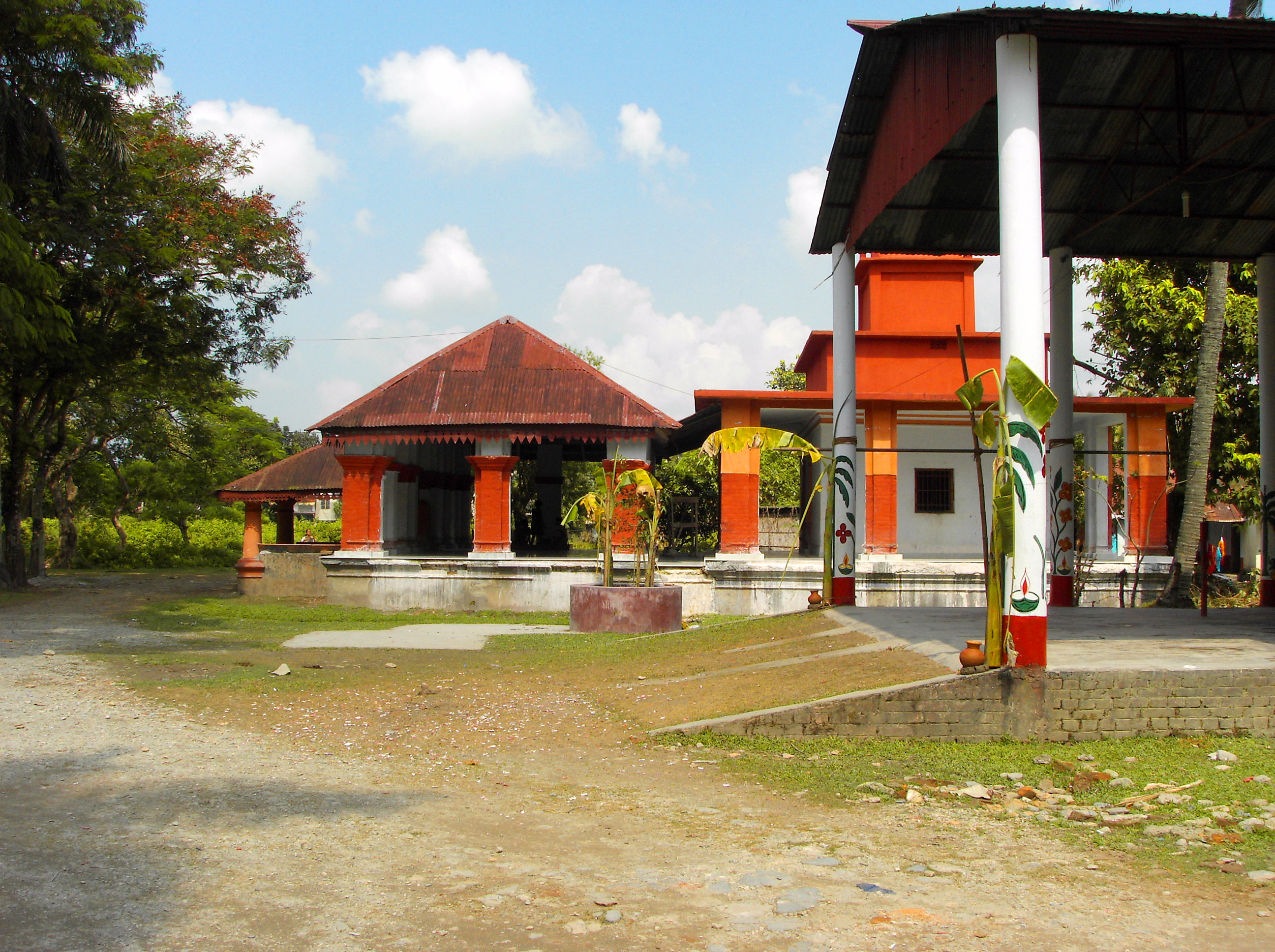
This is one of the oldest temples before the Raikut Palace.

The Rajas of Baikunthoupur paid tributes to the Maharaja of Cooch-Behar. In 1621, Mahi Dev Raikut, the Raikut of Vaikunthapur signified his independence by refusing to hold the umbrella over the Cooch-Behar Raja at the coronation of Birnarayan, and also refused to pay the annual tribute. Even after that, the Rajas of Baikunthopur, Bhuj Dev Raikut and Jagat Deb Raikut helped the Maharajas of Cooch-Behar in 1680, to drive out the Bhutias who attacked Cooch-Behar. But from 1687 onwards, the Rajas of Vaikunthapur and the Muslims repeatedly attacked Cooch-Behar. Satyanarayan (according to some "Santanarayan"), the then-Dewan of Cooch-Behar, defeated both of them and forced the Mughals to peace in 1771.

On the death of Maharajah Madan Narayan of Koch Bihar in 1680, with no immediate successor, Koch Bihar was attacked by the Bhutan army. The Raikuts of Baikunthapur sent troops and helped force the Bhutia army to retreat. The Raikats crowned Basudev Narayan (1680–1682 CE) as Maharajah and helped establish peace, before returning to their home. Two years later, the Bhutanese attacked again, captured the palace and massacred the royal family, including Basudev Narayan. The Raikuts Yogya dev and Bhuj dev intervened again, defeating the invaders in a fierce battle on the banks of the Manas River. The Raikuts then crowned Mahendra Narayan (1682–1693 CE), a five-year-old grandson of Pran Narayan, as the next Maharajah.

During the minority rule of Mahendra Narayan, Koch Bihar was unsettled. The lords of southern regions rejected Bihari rule, in place of direct tribute to the Mughal rulers as zamindars (landlords) of their territories. They accepted the authority of – and paid taxes to – Ibrahim Khan (ruler of Dhaka) and the Fauzdar of Ghoraghat. Even the Raikut princes of Baikunthopur and Pangar transferred loyalty to these powers, although perhaps only nominally. But from 1687 onwards, the Rajas of Baikunthopur and the Muslim rulers of Bengal repeatedly attacked Koch Bihar, now dominated by Bhutan.

The Faujdar of Rangpur, representing the Nawab of Bengal Shuja-ud-din (1727–1739), pressured the Raikuts to accept the suzerainty of the Nawab, sometime between 1736 and 1739. However, the Faujdar had to invade the territory in 1756 to enforce the claim. As late as 1772, the Raikuts were paying only Rs. 10,000 tribute, instead of the Rs. 30,651 agreed in 1763.

== Baikunthopur Estate ==
The Baikunthopur Estate was established by Siswa Singh, after defeating the King of Bhutan and Gour in 1522, covering an area of 328 square miles (850 km^{2}). His capital was at first built in today's Bodaganj in the thick forests near the Teesta river and in the Rajganj Block of Jalpaiguri district. It was shifted to the present site Jalpaiguri in the open plains by the thirteenth Raikat, Darpadev (1713–1726), in a sign of growing confidence.

The large pond near the palace was excavated at the time of Sarva Dev (1800–1847). Jion Gomasta Mohammedan from Dinajpur and a Rajbansi from Jalpaiguri were employed as contractors, and it is said that they were paid in cowries (conch shell), and not in coins.

== British acquisition ==
After the Battle of Plassey, the Dewan of Bengal, Bihar and Odisha came under the East India Company, in 1765. This estate was then temporarily included in the Dewan and was placed under Rangpur District and received the benefit of permanent settlement. In 1771, after the treaty of Bhutan with the East India Company, the British annexed Baikunthapur, and the Raikat was placed on the footing as a Zamindar and assessed a revenue of Rs. 30,000 per year. The Zamandaery was named Batrishazari. The motive seems to have been an attempt to stabilise the northern frontier of Bengal, then subject to raids by Gurkhas and Bhutias through the Raikat territories, but the policy was not immediately effective.

In 1773, Darpa Dev Raikat, the Raja of Baikunthopur, with the help of some bandits from Morang hills (Darjeeling and Nepal Terai), called sanyasis, and in collaboration with the Bhutias, continued attack on the territory of Cooch-Behar and the East India Company's property. Captain Stuart was sent to subdue the rising of the force. Captain Stuart defeated both Darpa Dev Raikat and the sanyasis and took possession of the city of Jalpaiguri. The letter of Captain Stuart addressed to PM Dacres, Chairman of the committee of the Rangpur circuit, on 3 February 1773, is reproduced below.

"At two in the afternoon I made a second march and took possession in the name of Honorable company of Jellpyegaurie, the fortress and Capital of Baikunthopur country, which the Rajas in the height of his consternation evacuated."

In 1789, a large body of sannyasis occupied Baikuntopur, whence they issued on their predatory excursions. They were defeated and practically starved out, as British soldiers closed all roads of exit. Within twelve months, 549 sannyasis were brought to trial in the court of Rangapur, with what results not exactly known, and the rest fled to Nepal and Bhutan.

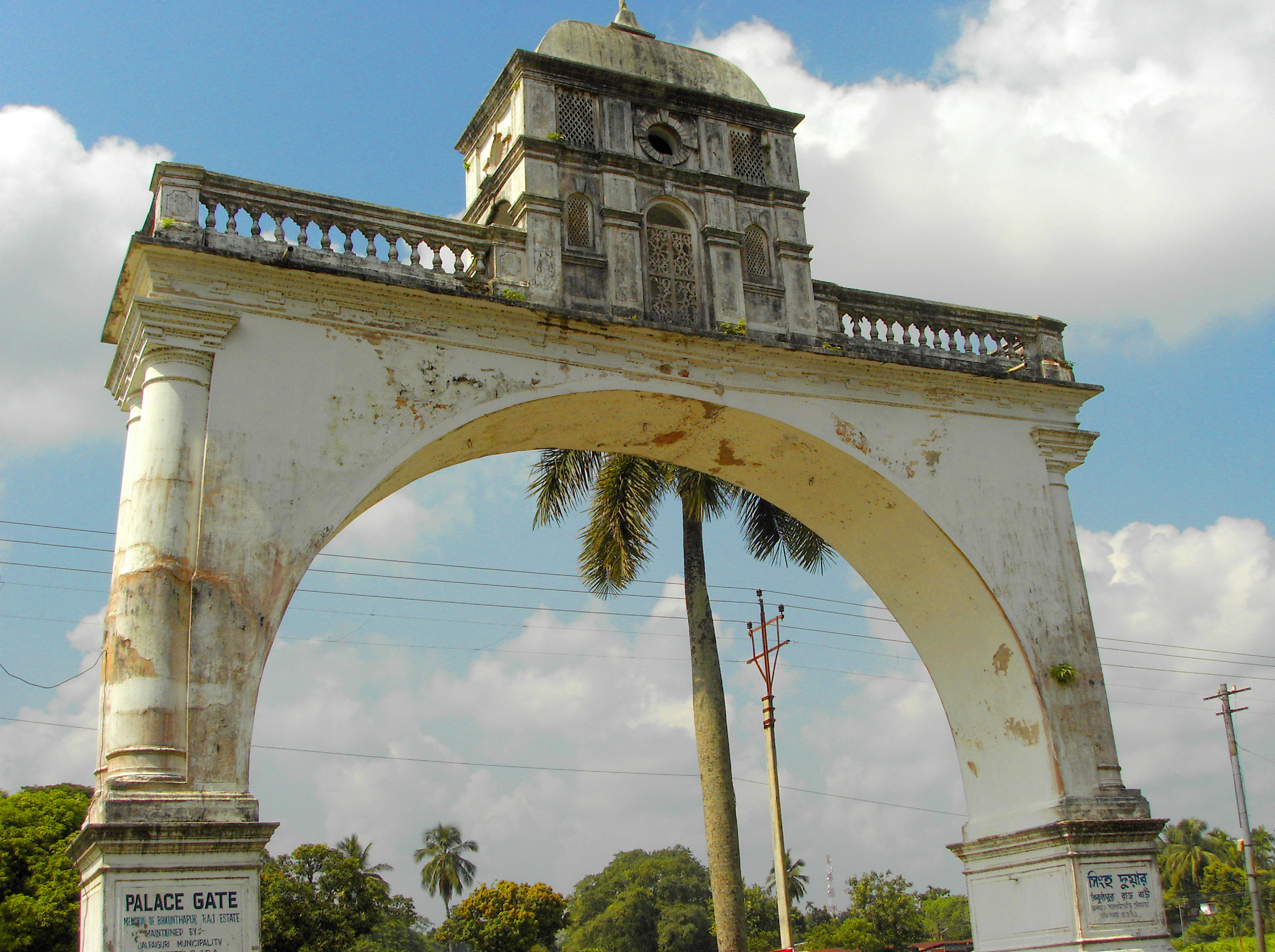
The Palace Gate, at present.

The independent Baikunthopur Estate ended with Darpa Dev Raikut, the 12th ruler, in 1774, after the reign of 230 years. The zamindari was abolished in 1955, after 180 years under the Bengal Estate Acquisition Act of 1954.

== Later history ==
In 1800, Sarva Dev Raikut, the 14th ruler after Shiva Singha, succeeded his father, Jayanto Dev. His title was disputed by his uncle Protap Dev Raikut, on the grounds that by family usages, a brother succeeded a brother in preference to the surviving sons. The case was brought up before the provincial (British) court in Murhidabad, but it was decided in favour of Sarva Dev Raikut (Surrup Deo).

In 1839, the British government in India complained to Bhutan that the Raikat of Baikunthopur had taken possession of the western Duars, and the Bhutan government had not responded. When Bhutan refused to offer compensation, on 6 September 1841, the British governor Auckland unilaterally ordered the occupation of Assam Duars, paying 10,000 rupees annually to Bhutan, in compensation.

Jalpaiguri district was formed on 1 January 1869, with Baikunthopur, western Duars (the portion of land between the river Tista and Sankosh) and the five Chaklas: (1) Patgram, (2) Devigunj, (3) Boda, (4) Pachaghar, and (5) Titalla within the zamindari of Cooch-Behar. Under the Radcliffe award of the partition of this district in 1947, these five Chaklas were transferred to East Pakistan. The present Jalpaiguri District consists of the old Baikunthopur Estate and the western Duars.

== Disputes over inheritance ==
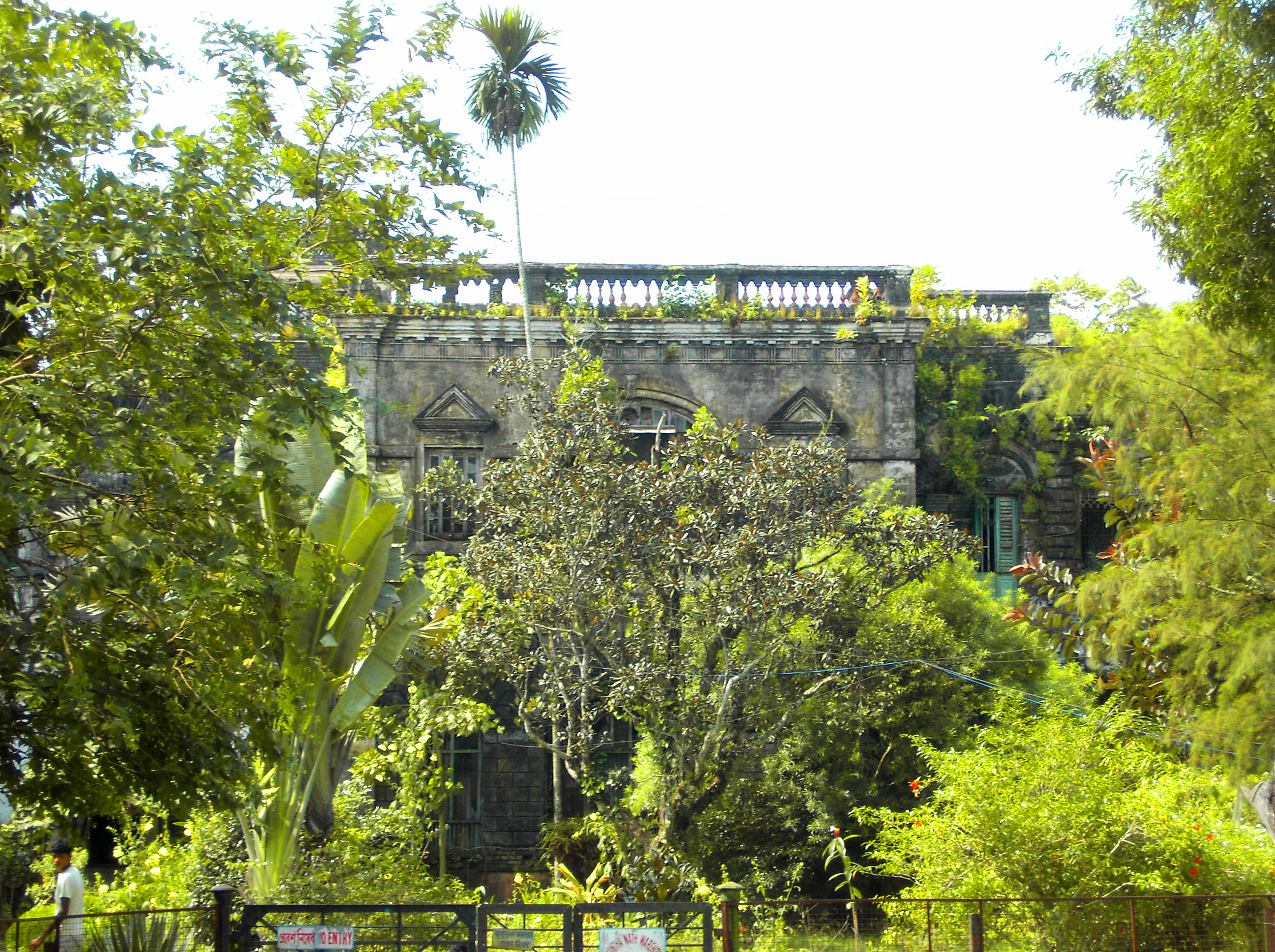
Present state of the palace.

Sarva Dev Raikut died in 1847 (according to Milligan). He left seven sons. Dogra dev Raikut was the eldest, but he could not inherit as he was stated to be the son of a concubine. Rajendra Dev Raikut, the 6th son, inherited the property, as his mother was married in Phul-Bio. His title was again disputed by the second son, Makaranda Dev Raikut, on the grounds that he was a legitimate son of Sarva Dev Raikut, as his mother was married in "Gandharbo" fashion. The mother of Makranda, being a woman, could not succeed according to customs of the family; however, the British Court of Rangpur decided in favour of Makranda as both. The Brahmo marriage, of which Rajendra was the son, and the Gandharbo marriage, of which Makranda was the son, were both legitimate marriages, and Makaranda being elder was to succeed Sarvo Dev. After the death of Makaranda, his eldest son Chandra Sekhar succeeded, but after Chandra Sekhar, his brother Jogendra Dev became Raikut. In fact, of the 12 raikuts who successively had possession of the Estate prior to Sarva Dev, they were succeeded by two brothers and one by a nephew.

After the death of Jogendra Dev Raikut, in March 1878, the 18th ruler of the dynasty, a succession case went up to the provincial (Privy) council of England, between Fanindra Dev Raikut, youngest son of Sarva Dev Raikat, and Rajeswar Das (Jagadindra Dev Raikut), minor adopted son and half-brother of Rani Jagadeswari, one of the three wives of late Jogendra Dev Raikat. Fanindra was popularly called "Bhola Saheb" Rajeswar Das (Jagindra Dev Raikut) and was actually a minor adopted son and half-brother of Rani Jagedeswari. However, the Privy council decided in favour of Fanindra Dev Raikut, and held that the adoption was invalid.

Raja Prasanna Dev Raikut, the last Raja of Baikunthopur in Jalpaiguri District, West Bengal, died intestate on 4 December 1946. He had four wives: Hirannaprava Devi, Rani Ashrumati Devi, Rani Runchi Devi, and Rani Deela Devi. Rani Deela Devi and Rani Runchi Devi belonged to the Lepcha tribe.

Rupendra alleged that the Raja had married her according to the Gandharba form. The suit was contested by Rani Asrumati and the agnatic relations who denied that there had been any marriage between the Raja and the mother of the respondent Rupendra. The suit was transferred to the High Court at Calcutta, by an order made on 12 April 1949, under clause 13 of its Letters Patent. The respondent Rupendra made an application to the High Court, in that suit for appointment of a receiver, but it was dismissed on 29 July 1952. There was an appeal from this order, but the records do not show that it succeeded. It appears that two agnatic relations, namely, Kumar Guru Charan and Kumar Jitendra filed suits in the High Court at Calcutta, each claiming title to the estate as the sole heir of the deceased Raja. All these suits are still pending.

After a long prosecution, the High Court of Calcutta dismissed the claim of Rupendra and declared the descendants of Rani Ashrumati Devi as the legal heir of the deceased Raja. Presently, most of the properties have undertaken by Government of West Bengal for restoration. Though, in one portion of the royal building, the family of Rani Ashrumati's descendants live and they only perform the royal family rituals and customs until today.

== Calcutta life ==
Hirrannaprova Devi, the first wife of Raja Prasanna Dev Raikut was not interested in the matter of the estate of the Jalpaiguri property. In Calcutta, Raja settled, so Hironnaprava along with his four sons, Satendra kumar, Birendra kumar, Sourendra kumar and Dhirendra kumar, came to Calcutta in the late 1920s.

== Family customs and rituals ==
The Raikuts identify themselves as Hindu kshatriya. Therefore, they had observed all the rites as Hindus in every aspect of lives without dismantling their indigenous connections. The Raikut rajas were great devotees of Lord Shiva, Durga and Manasa, prime Hindu deities. They observed the Durga Puja and Manasa-puja with the same overwhelming pomp. The mela held in the premises of Rajbari in the time of Manasa-puja is one of the famous celebration of the District from past few hundred years till now-a-days. It is generally held on the last day of Bengali month Shraban, i.e., middle of the month of July. Thousands of small craftsmen, artists, vendors came here to trade their articles in this course of time from all over the districts. Previously, the Mela lasts for a long joyous fortnight, but now-a-days it has cut short for only seven days. On the first day of Mela, it has been a declared local holiday for all the offices, schools and colleges of Jalpaiguri.

== Gallery ==
Raja Prasanna Dev Raikat and Rani Deela Devi in Darjeeling.

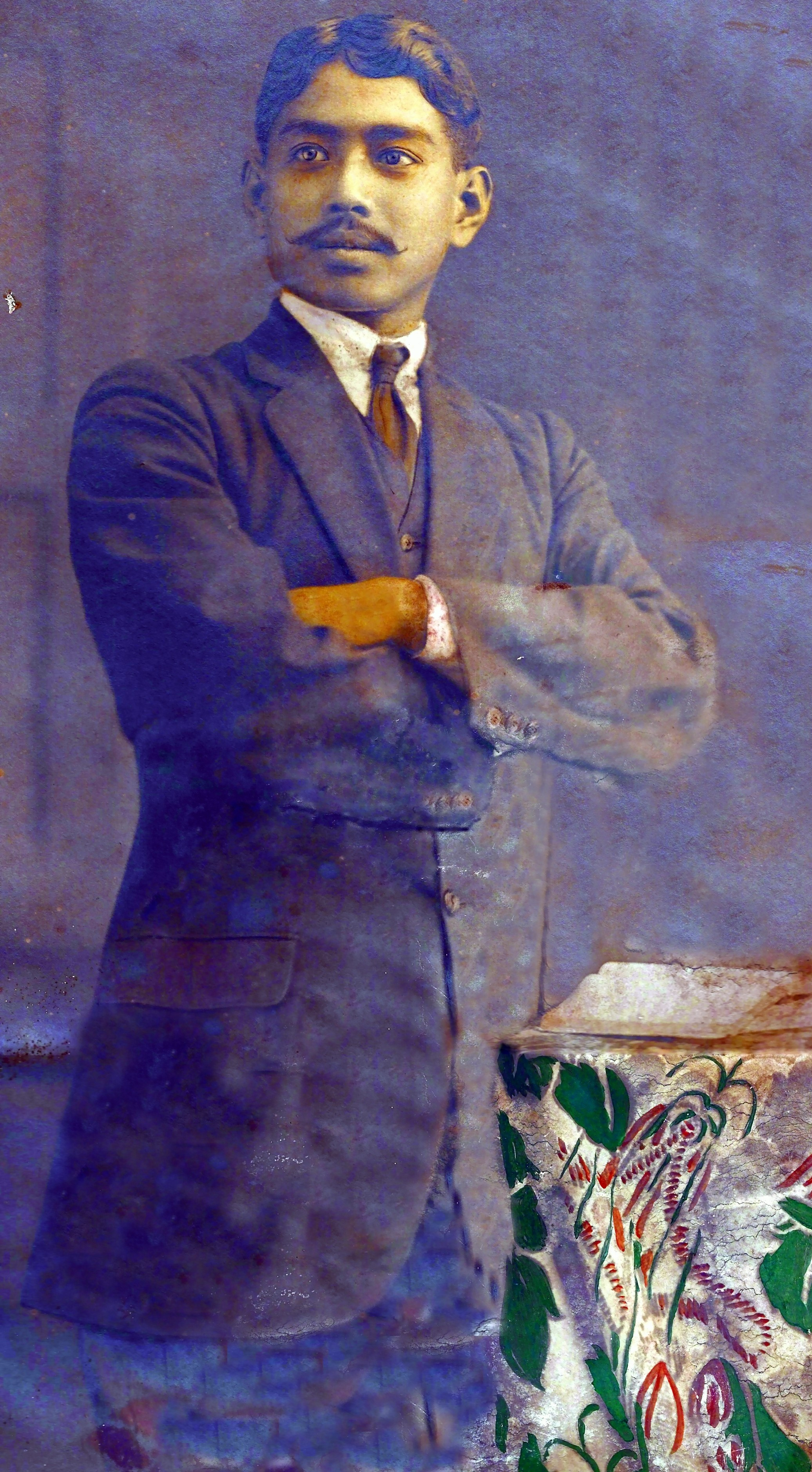
Raja Prasanna Dev Raikat.

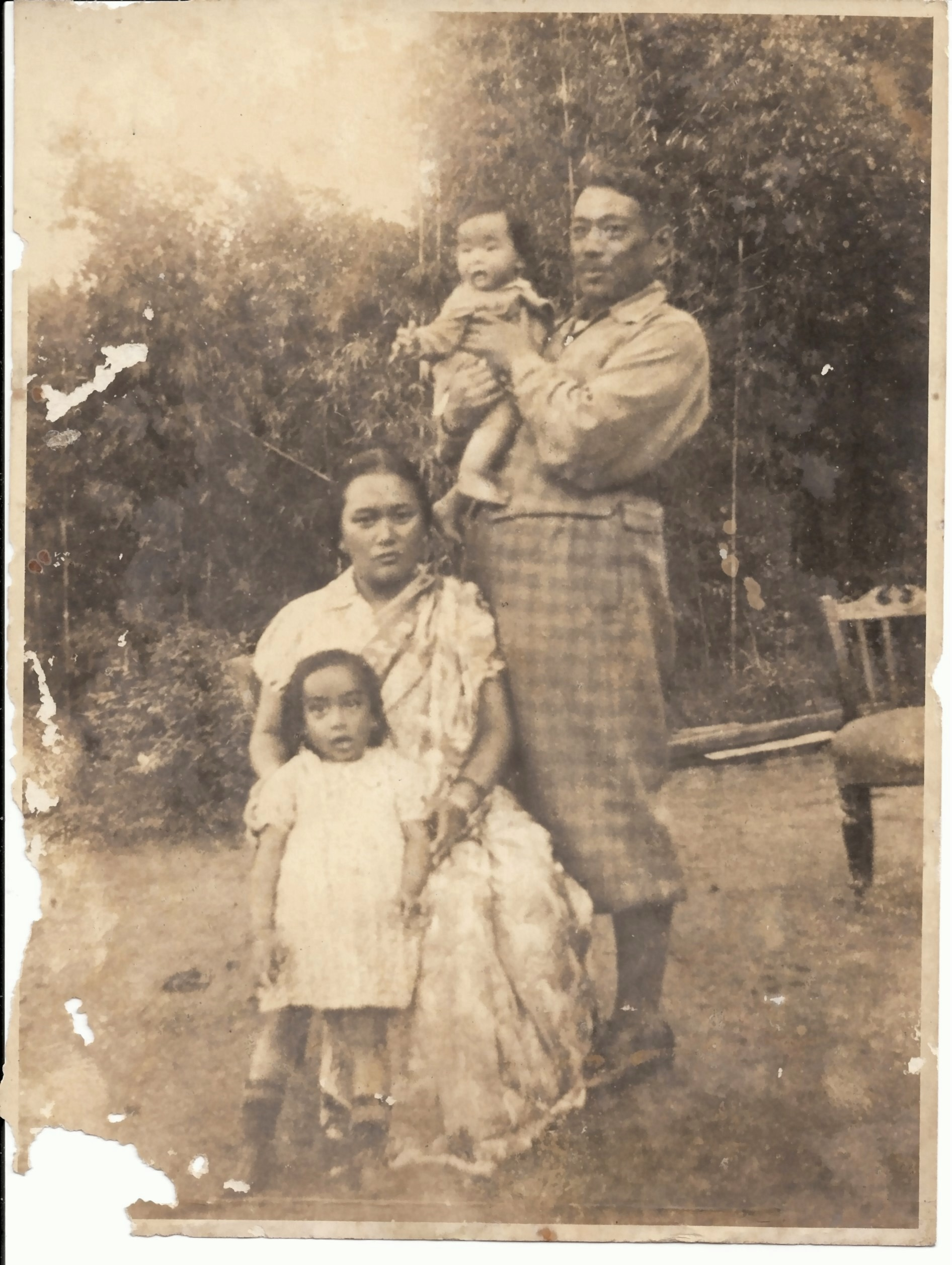
Raja Prasanna Dev Raikat with family.

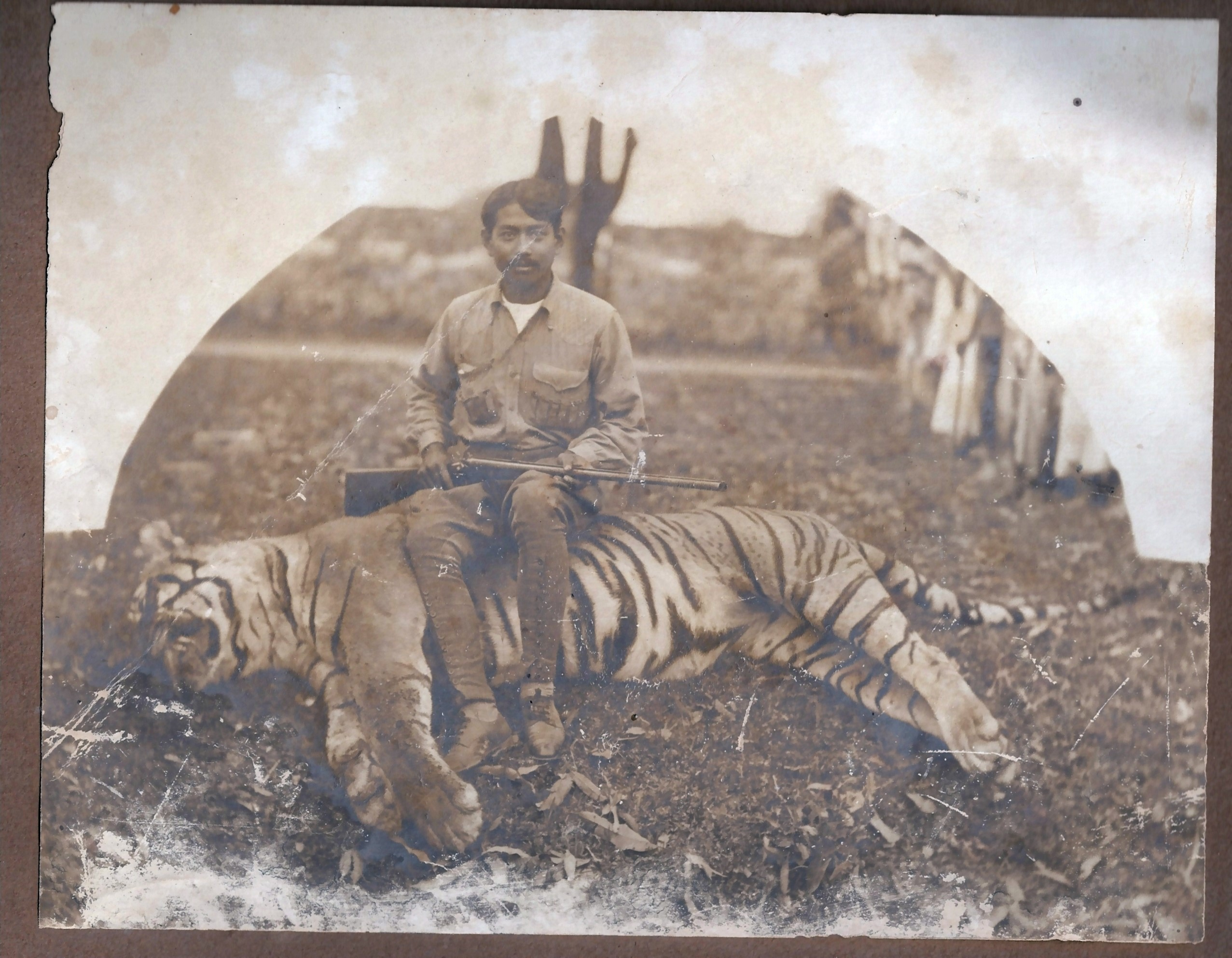
Raja Prasanna Dev Raikat after the hunt.
