= Biswa Singha =

16th-century ruler in South Asia

- Reign: 1515–1540
- Coronation: 1515
- Predecessor: None
- Successor: Nara Narayan
- Issue: Nara Narayan, Chilarai
- Dynasty: Koch dynasty
- Father: Hariya Mandal
- Mother: Hira

Biswa Singha (r. 1515–1540) was the progenitor king of the Koch dynasty of the Kamata kingdom. He was able to unify different Bodo tribes, replace the Baro-Bhuyans of Kamata kingdom, and establish a dynasty the remnant of which still exists today.

== Historical context of Biswa Singha ==
After break-up of the Kamarupa kingdom in the 12th century, its territories were divided among different kingdoms. To the east emerged the Chutia, in the central and south emerged the Kachari kingdoms. Between the Kachari and Chutia, the Ahom kingdom rose. In the west, there arose the Kamata kingdom. In the regions between the Kamata in the west and the Chutia and Dimasa kingdoms in the east was the region of the confederate Baro-Bhuyans landlords who formed the buffer. In 1498, Alauddin Hussain Shah the Sultan of Bengal attacked Nilambar, the then king of Kamata, and occupied it. He left the region in the hands of his son Danyal Husayn, who was attacked and defeated by a confederation of Bhuyan landlords led by Harup Narayan. The Bhuyans succeeded in removing the conquerors, but they failed to create a kingdom and instead maintained their independent fiefdoms.

In this political vacuum Biswa Singha managed to unify different tribal groups and establish the Koch dynasty in the seat of the erstwhile Kamata kingdom.

== Biography ==
=== Rise of Biswa Singha ===
Bisu, as he was then known, was born to Hariya Mandal of Mount Chikna in present-day Kokrajhar district of Assam, the head of twelve Mech families and Hira, the daughter of Hajo, a Koch leader in the later part of the 15th century. Bisu abandoned his father's legacy, received the political legacy of his grandfather, Hajo, and established himself as the chief of the eastern branch of the Koches in the Khuntaghat region and became a landlord, probably around 1509. As a landlord Bisu fought alongside the Bhuyans against the occupation of Kamata kingdom by Alauddin Husain Shah and thus learned their military tactics.

Bisu began his campaign around 1509 and successfully managed to unify the Mech, Koch, and Bhutias of Darrang, Karaibari, Atiabari, Kamtabari and Balrampur. The Bhuyan chiefs he defeated during his campaign were the Bhuyans of Ouguri, Kusum Bhuyan, Dighala Bhuyan, Kalia Bhuyan, the Bhuyan of Jhargaon, Kabilash Bhuyan, the Bhuyans of Karnapur, Phulaguri, and Bijni and finally the Bhuyan of Pandunath (Pandu at Guwahati). His campaign against the Karnapur Bhuyan was particularly difficult, and he could defeat him only with a stratagem during Bihu. His campaign caused problems for other adjoining Bhuyans, like those Gandharva Ray of Banduka and Sriram Khan of Sajalagram.

=== At Kamatapur ===
Brahman priest created a legend of Bisu being born as the son of Shiva to give legitimacy to his rule and bestowed on him the status of kshatriya varna and here he took the Hindu name Biswa Singha. With this new found position, the Koch royal family adopted the name – Rajbanshi. This happened in 1515, which is taken as the beginning of the rule of the Koch dynasty in Kamata. He began consolidating his power with a well thought out administrative system. He appointed his brother Sisu (Sisya Singha) as the yuvaraj, the descendants of who became the Raikut kings of Jalpaiguri. He created positions for twelve ministers called Karjis and recruited them from the twelve important Mech families of his tribesmen. Two of the most important Karjis and the yuvaraj (Raikot) formed a cabinet. A commander of a small standing army, the senapati, was created. After a census, he created a gradation of officers who controlled the population. Individual able-bodied males were called Paiks, with commanders Thakuria (over 20 Paiks), Saikia (over 100 Paiks), Hazari (over 1000 Paiks), Omra (over 3000 Paiks) and Nawab (over 66,000 Paiks). The only Brahmin appointee was the royal priest (raj purohit).

In order to maintain a tribe-centric policy, Biswa Singha instructed his ministers not to get brides from foreign people but instead from the Koch, Mech or Kachari tribes. He later appointed his sons in different public works, Nara Singha was in charge of the territory conquered from the king of Bhutan. Malladev (later Nara Narayana was the heir apparent; Sukladhwaj (later Chilarai), Gosain Kamal (son of Chandrakanti of Kamarupa) was in charge of public works.

=== Death ===
According to the Darrangraj Vamshavali written in the last quarter of the 18th century, Biswa Singha reigned for 25 years and died of sores; and according to the Kochbiharer Itihas he died of smallpox.

=== In Yogini Tantra ===
In Yogini Tantra, a 16th/17th century text describes Biswa Singha as the conqueror of Kàma(rupa) (Kamrup), Saumàra (Ahom) and Gaudapañcama (Gauda).

== Buffer state ==
Even though the restructuring of the Kamata kingdom was done in all earnest, the new administration was still tenuous. The Gaur rulers still had ambitions to conquer the Brahmaputra valley which brought them into conflict with the newly expanded Ahom kingdom. One such invasion was by Turbak, who attacked the Ahoms in 1532–1533, most likely passing through the Kamata kingdom. Turbak was summarily defeated, and the remnant of his army was pursued to the Karatoya river, the western boundary of the Kamata kingdom, by the Ahom general Tonkham Borgohain. At the end of this expedition, Tonkham Borgohain restored Biswa Singha at his seat of power at Kamata Kingdom to act as a buffer between the Ahom kingdom and the Gaur ambitions in Brahmaputra Valley.

An ambitious person, Biswa Singha could not bear the status of vassalage to the Ahom kingdom, and made an abortive attempt to invade the Ahom kingdom in about 1537. Due to logistical shortcomings, he had to abandon his ambitions, and instead paid a visit to the Ahom court, where he agreed to pay an annual tribute. This was unbearable to him, and his deathbed injunction to his successors were to remove this vassalage.

He invaded the kingdoms of Soumarpith, Bijni, Bidyagram and Bijaypur and was victorious. Next he attacked Bhutan and after victory made a treaty with Bhutan. Biswa Singha also acquired major portions of Gour, then ruled by Hossien Shah. On the request of his mother he shifted his capital from the Chikna Mountains to Hingulabas in the plains. During his reign Muslim invaders, including Turuk Khan and Nasrat Shah, the king of Gour attacked his kingdom numerous times but after facing defeat they were forced to retreat. His bravery and courage helped the Koch-Kamata Kingdom hold a strong base.

He sent his two son Nara Narayan & Sukladhaj (Chilarai) to a Sanskrit scholar named Brahmananda in Varanasi to introduce them to the ideals of higher caste Hindus. He later brought several priests from places like Kanauj, Mithila, Benaras and Puri (Srikshetra) to perform Brahminical rites that led to the sankristisation of the Koch royal family from tribalism.

== Legacy ==
Biswa Singha had the skill, intelligence and power which enabled him lay the foundation of a strong kingdom on the ruins of Kamarupa-Kamanta. He proved himself to be a successful conqueror and an efficient administrator. He had the qualities of a statesman which is evident from his relations with Ahoms. It was he, who crushed the strong power of Bhuyans in western Assam and established a strong centralised monarchy, which was destined to play a far more important role during the reign of his illustrious son Naranarayan.

== Notes ==
Biswa Singha Koch dynasty
Regnal titles
Preceded by none	Kamateshwar	Succeeded by Nara Narayan
