= Koch dynasty =

Indian dynasty of Assam and Bengal (1515–1949)

Koch Kingdom Koch Dynasty
- 1515–1949–1956
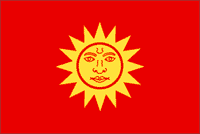
- Flag of Kamata Kingdom
- Status: historical kingdom
- Capital: Chiknabari; Hingulabas; Bijni; Dumuria; Jogighopa; Abhayapuri; Kamatapur (present-day Gosanimari); Cooch Behar
- Common languages: Kamrupic (Assamese, Kamtapuri); Koch; Garo; Mech; Sikkimese; Regional / local languages; Sanskrit (for religious and court usage)
- Religion: Hinduism; Other ethnic religion
- Government: hereditary monarchy
- Maharaja
  - 1515–1540: Biswa Singha
  - 1540–1587: Nara Narayan
  - 1581–1603: Raghudev
  - 1586–1621: Lakshmi Narayan
  - 1922–1947: Jagaddipendra Narayan
- Historical era: Early modern period
  - Established by Biswa Singha: 1515
  - Expansion: 1510–1577
  - Division into Koch Hajo and Koch Bihar: 1587
  - princely state of British India: 1775
  - Joined India Union: 1949–1956
- Currency: Narayani
Preceded by
Baro-Bhuyan
Succeeded by
Republic of India
Ahom kingdom
Mughal Empire
Kachari kingdom
- Today part of: India; Bangladesh; Bhutan

The Koch dynasty (/kɒtʃ/; 1515–1949) ruled parts of eastern Indian subcontinent in present-day Assam and Bengal. Biswa Singha established power in the erstwhile Kamata Kingdom which had emerged from the decaying Kamarupa Kingdom. The dynasty came to power by overthrowing the Baro-Bhuyans of the region, who previously revolted against the rule established by Alauddin Husain Shah.

The dynasty split into three among the descendants of Biswa Singha's three sons: two antagonistic branches Koch Bihar and Koch Hajo and a third branch at Khaspur. Koch Bihar aligned with the Mughals and the Koch Hajo branch broke up into various sub-branches under the Ahom kingdom. Koch Bihar became a princely state during British rule and was absorbed after Indian independence. The third branch at Khaspur (Khaspur kingdom) was absorbed completely into the Kachari kingdom. Raikat is a collateral branch of the Koch dynasty that claim descent from the Sisya Singha, the brother of Biswa Singha.

== Etymology ==
The name Koch denotes a matrilineal ethnic group to which Biswa Singha's mother belonged; and the king as well as most of the population of the kingdom (Kamata Kingdom) belonged to the Koch community.

== History ==
=== Historical background ===
After the fall of the Pala dynasty, a Bengali dynasty from Varendra, the kingdom fractured into different domains in the 12th century. Sandhya, a ruler of Kamarupanagara (present-day North Guwahati) moved his capital further west to present-day North Bengal in the middle of the 13th century and the domain he ruled over came to be called Kamata kingdom. The buffer region, between the eastern kingdoms and Kamata was the domain of the Baro-Bhuyans chieftains. Alauddin Husain Shah of Gaur removed Nilambar of the Khen dynasty in 1498, occupied Kamata and placed his son Danyal Husayn in charge. Within a few years the Baro-Bhuyans—led by one Harup Narayan of the Brahmaputra valley—defeated, captured, and executed Daniyal, and the region lapsed into Bhuyan confederate rule.

==== Emergence of the Koch power ====
It was in this context that a number of independent Koch tribes were united under a leader named Hajo, who occupied Rangpur and Kamrup. The Koches, spreading towards the southern plains, were able to ally with other tribal groups. Among various factors, the shift from slash-and-burn cultivation to settled cultivation and the breakdown of tribal clan-based relations are given as factors that contributed to the growth of Koch power.

As part of these alliances Hajo's daughter Hira married Hariya Mandal, a member of the Mech tribe from Chiknagram in present-day Kokrajhar district, though these ethnic identities are difficult to discern since there were frequent intermarriages. Bisu, born to Hariya and Hira, acquired the political legacy of his grandfather Hajo and established himself as the chief of the eastern branch of the Koches in the Khuntaghat region (present-day Kokrajhar district of Assam). It is thought that Bisu fought under the leadership of the Bhuyans as a landlord against the occupation of Kamata kingdom by Alauddin Husain Shah and thus learned their military tactics.

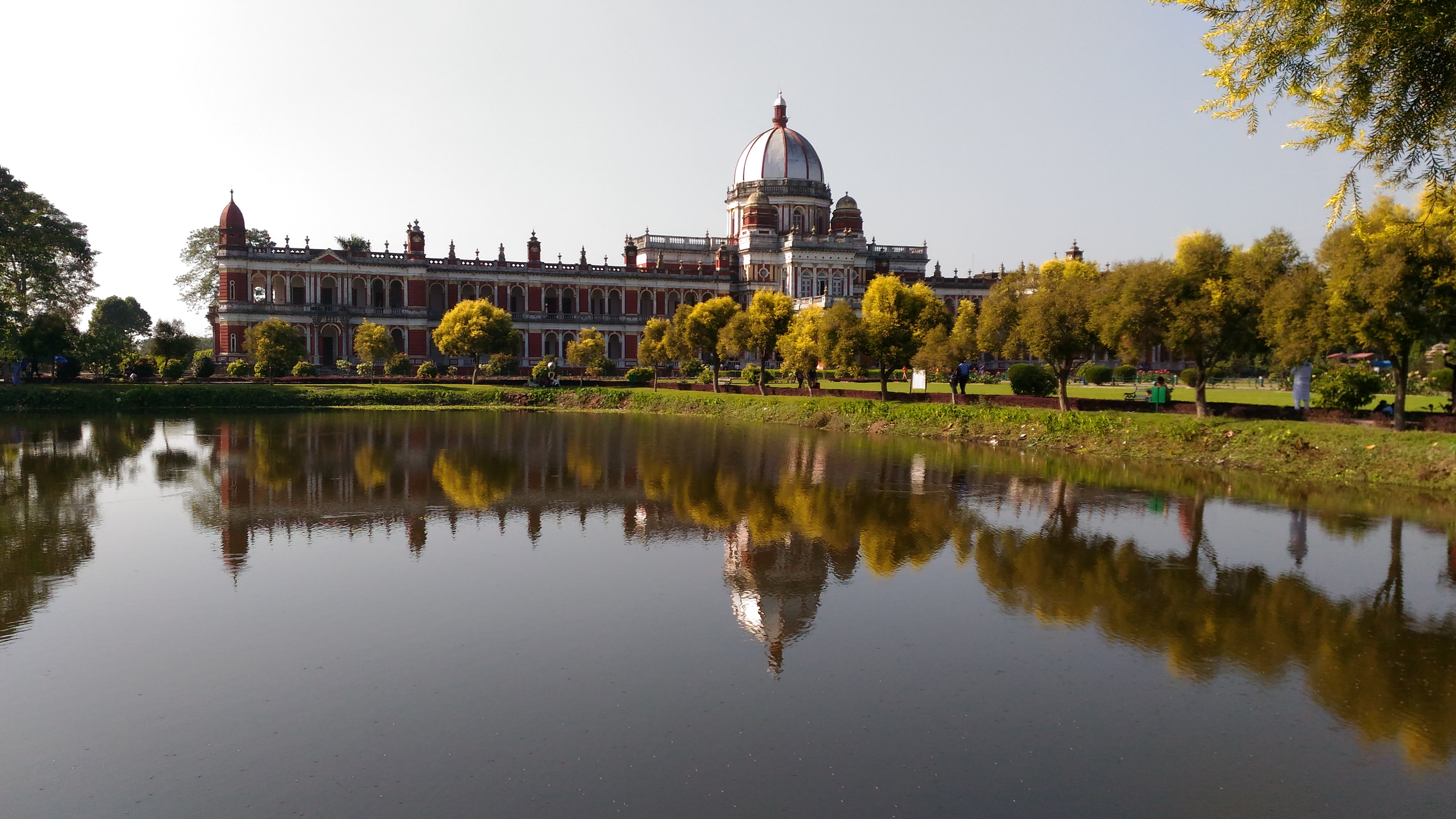
Cooch Behar Palace constructed during the reign of Nripendra Narayan

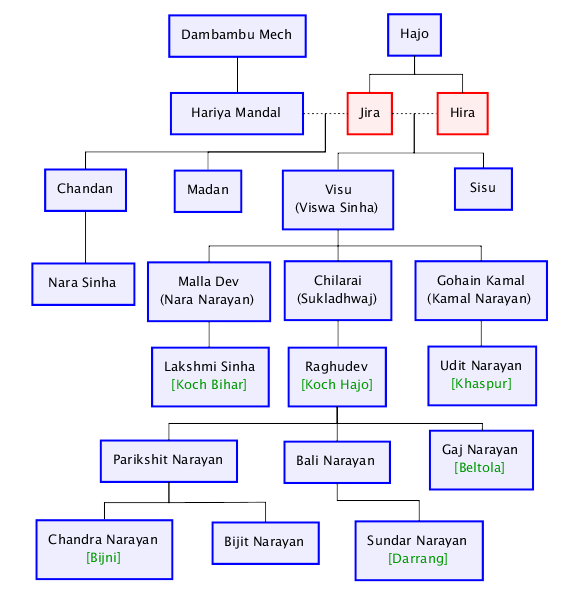
Origin of the Koch dynasty, based on the Darrang Raja Vamsavali

=== Consolidation of power under Bisu ===
He sought the alliance of tribal chiefs, against the more powerful Baro-Bhuyans and began his campaign around 1509. Successively, he defeated the Bhuyans of Ouguri, Jhargaon, Karnapur, Phulaguri, Bijni and Pandunath (Pandu, in Guwahati). He was particularly stretched by the Bhuyan of Karnapur, and could defeat him only by a stratagem during Bihu.

In some records Bisu moved his capital from Chikana to Hingulabas (near present-day Samuktala) and then finally to Kamatapur (now called Gosanimari) which is just a few miles southeast of the present-day Cooch Behar town—but since these movements were recorded much after the events the dates and rulers associated with these movements are not expected to be accurate and these movements represent the gradual movement of Koch power towards the southern plains of the Brahmaputra Valley. After subjugating the petty rulers, he announced himself the king of Kamata bounded on the east by Barnadi River and on the west by the Karatoya River in the year 1515.

The Koch dynasty in Kamata was one of several tribal formations that developed into statehoods around 15th century in northeast India—Ahom, Chutia, Dimasa, Tripura, Manipur, etc.

=== Sanskritisation ===
At his coronation Bisu adopted Hinduism and the name Biswa Singha. Nevertheless, he retained the Koch identity of his mother discarding the ethnic identity of his father. Later, Brahman pundits created a legend that lord Siva was the father of Biswa Singha to give legitimacy to his rule and conferred on him the status of the Kshatriya varna. According to the legend constructed at the time of coronation, Bisu was son of Siva and his tribe either the Koch or Mech people were Kshatriyas who ran away from the fear of extermination by the Brahman sage Parashurama and took shelter in Western Assam and Northern Bengal and later disguised themselves as Mlechchas.

This process of hinduisation was much slower in the lower strata of the society, the king Biswa Singha with his tribal origin claimed Rajbanshi kshatriya status, the lower class Koch took this name after the 18th century.

=== Zenith ===
Biswa Singha's two sons, Naranarayan and Shukladhwaj (Chilarai), the king and the commander-in-chief of the army respectively, took the kingdom to its zenith. During the reign of Nara Narayan, Koch Behar saw the propagation of eksarana-namadharma by Sankardev along with his two disciples Madhavdeva and Damodardev, which helped brought a cultural renaissance to the kingdom. The spread of this new religious movement was initially resisted by the Koch, Mech and Kachari people residing in the Koch-Kamata kingdom, for which Nara Narayan made an official order to recognise the different religious practices of the people residing in the kingdom, though by the end of the 18th century, the masses of the Koch population had absorbed considerable Hindu content.

Later, Nara Narayan made Raghudev, the son of Chilarai, the governor of Koch Hajo, the eastern portion of the country. After the death of Nara Narayan, Raghudev declared independence. The division of the Kamata kingdom into Koch Bihar and Koch Hajo was permanent.

== Branches ==
=== Rulers of undivided Koch kingdom ===
- Biswa Singha (1515–1540)
- Nara Narayan (1540–1586)

=== Rulers of Koch Bihar ===
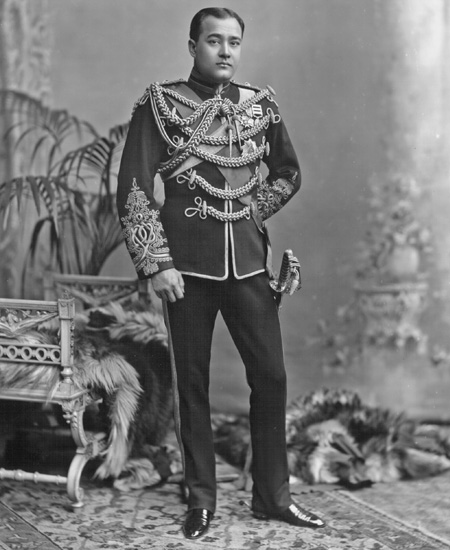
Maharaja Nripendra Narayan of Cooch Bihar

- Lakshmi Narayan
- Bir Narayan
- Pran Narayan
- Basudev Narayan
- Mahindra Narayan
- Roop Narayan
- Upendra Narayan
- Devendra Narayan
- Dhairjendra Narayan
- Rajendra Narayan
- Dharendra Narayan
- Harendra Narayan
- Shivendra Narayan
- Narendra Narayan
- Nripendra Narayan
- Rajendra Narayan II
- Jitendra Narayan (father of Gayatri Devi)
- Jagaddipendra Narayan (brother of Gayatri Devi)
- Virajdendra Narayan

=== Rulers of Koch Hajo ===
- Raghudev (son of Chilarai, nephew of Nara Narayan)
- Parikshit Narayan

=== Rulers of Darrang ===
The Mughal Subah, in alliance with Lakshmi Narayan of Koch Bihar, attacked Parikshit Narayan of Koch Hajo in 1612. Koch Hajo, bounded by Sankosh River in the west and Barnadi river in the east, was occupied by the end of that year. Parikshit Narayan was sent to Delhi for an audience with the Mughal Emperor, but his brother Balinarayan escaped and took refuge in the Ahom kingdom. The region to the east of Barnadi and up to the Bharali river was under the control of some Baro-Bhuyan chieftains, but they were soon removed by the Mughals. In 1615 the Mughals, under Syed Hakim and Syed Aba Bakr, attacked the Ahoms but were repelled back to the Barnadi river. The Ahom king, Prataap Singha, then established Balinarayan as a vassal in the newly acquired region between Barnadi and Bharali rivers, and called it Darrang. Balinarayan's descendants continued to rule the region as a tributary to the Ahom kingdom till it was annexed by the British in 1826.

- Balinarayan (brother of Parikshit Narayan)
- Mahendra Narayan
- Chandra Narayan
- Surya Narayan

=== Rulers of Beltola ===
- Gaj Narayan Dev (brother of Parikshit Narayan, ruler of Koch Hajo, brother of Balinarayan, first Koch ruler of Darrang).
- Shivendra Narayan Dev (Son of Gaj Narayan)
- Gandharva Narayan Dev (Son of Shivendra Narayan)
- Uttam Narayan Dev (Son of Gandharva Narayan Dev)
- Dhwaja Narayan Dev (Son of Uttam Narayan Dev)
- Jay Narayan Dev (Son of Dhwaja Narayan Dev)
- Lambodar Narayan Dev (Son of Jay Narayan Dev)
- Lokpal Narayan Dev (Son of Lambodar Narayan Dev)
- Amrit Narayan Dev (Son of Lokpal Narayan Dev)
- Chandra Narayan Dev (Son of Lokpal Narayan Dev) (died 1910 CE)
- Rajendra Narayan Dev (Son of Chandra Narayan Dev) (died 1937 CE)
- Lakshmipriya Devi (wife of Rajendra Narayan Dev) (reign:1937–1947 CE died: 1991 CE)

=== Rulers of Bijni ===
The Bijni rulers reigned between the Sankosh and the Manas rivers, the region immediately to the east of Koch Bihar.

- Chandra Narayan (son of Parikshit Narayan)
- Joy Narayan
- Shiv Narayan
- Bijoy Narayan
- Mukunda Narayan
- Haridev Narayan
- Balit Narayan
- Indra Narayan
- Amrit Narayan
- Kumud Narayan
- Jogendra Narayan
- Bhairabendra Narayan

=== Rulers of Khaspur ===
The Barak valley was obtained by Chilarai in 1562 from the Twipra kingdom during his expedition when he subjugated most of the major rulers in Northeast India and established the Khaspur state with a garrison at Brahmapur, that eventually came to be called Khaspur (Brahmapur→Kochpur→Khaspur). The Koch rule began with the appointment of Kamal Narayan (step-brother of Chilarai and Naranarayan) as the Dewan a couple of years after the establishment of the garrison. Kamalnarayan established eighteen clans of Koch families that took hereditary roles in the state of Khaspur and who came to be known as Dheyans (after Dewan). The independent rule of the Khaspur rulers ended in 1745 when it merged with the Kachari kingdom.

The rulers of the Koch kingdom at Khaspur were:

- Kamal Narayan (Gohain Kamal, son of Biswa Singha, governor of Khaspur)
- Udita Narayan (declared independence of Khaspur in 1590)
- Vijay Narayana
- Dhir Narayana
- Mahendra Narayana
- Ranjit
- Nara Singha
- Bhim Singha (his only issue, daughter Kanchani, married a prince of Kachari kingdom, and Khaspur merged with the Kachari kingdom.)

== See also ==
- Koch (caste)
- Rajbongshi people

== Gallery ==
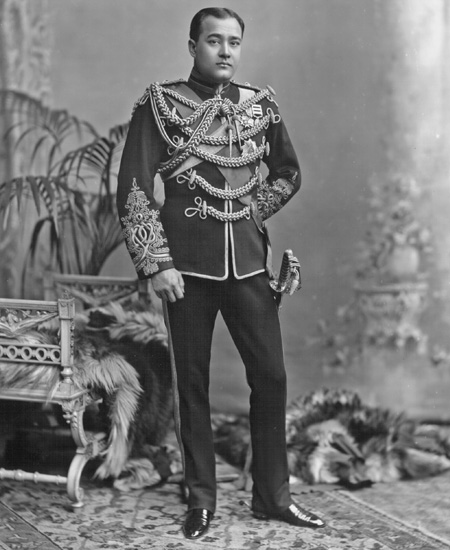
Shri Sir Nripendra Narayan, Maharaja of Cooch Behar.

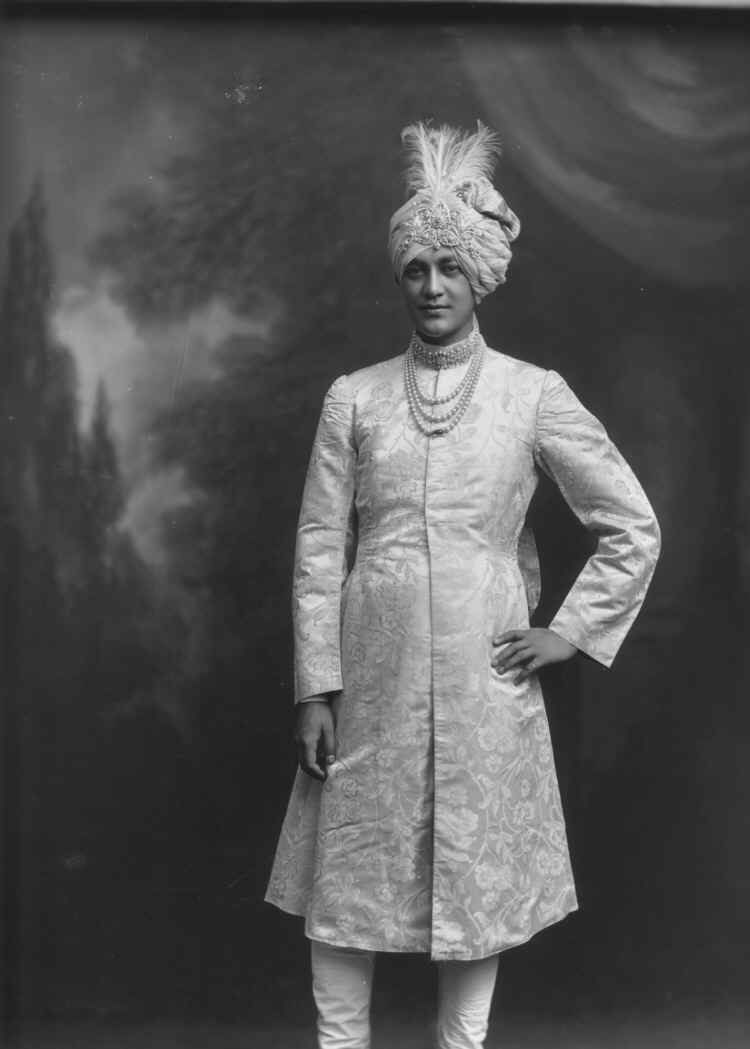
Maharaja Shri Sir Jitendra Narayan Bhup Bahadur, Maharaja of Cooch-Behar, KCSI, 1913.
