= Chilarai =

Koch Dynasty noble (1510–1571)

Bir Chilarai Koch
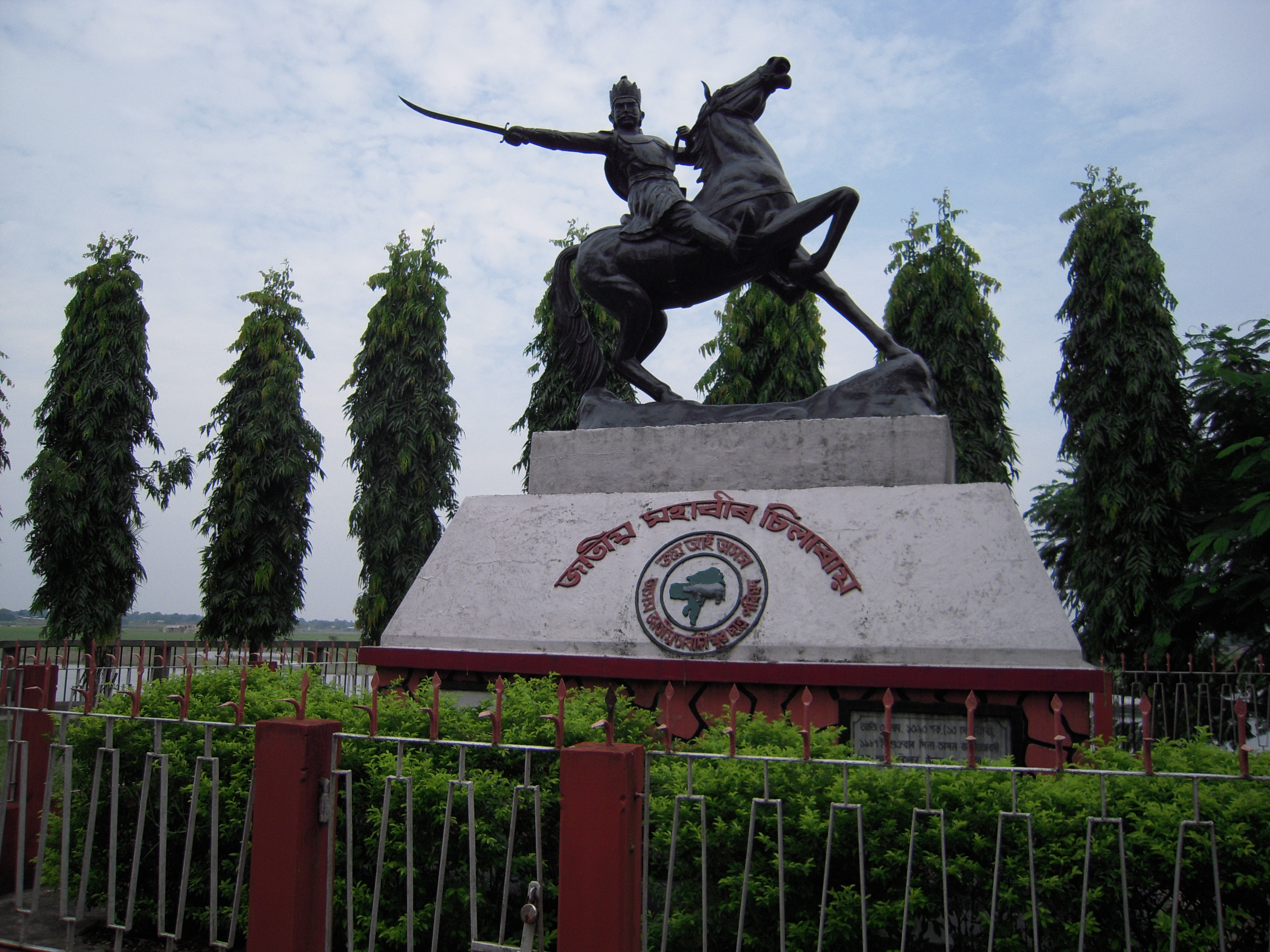
- Statue of Bir Chilarai at Dhubri, Assam
- Born: Sukladhwaja; 1510
- Died: 1571 (aged 60–61)
- Spouse: Kamalpriya
- Relatives: Biswa Singha (father); Nara Narayan (brother)
- Military career
- Allegiance: Koch dynasty
- Service years: 1563–1571 A.D.
- Rank: Commander-in-Chief
- Conflicts: Koch–Ahom conflicts; Koch-Jaintia War; Koch Invasion of Tripura; Koch Invasion of Sylhet

Sukladhwaja (popularly known as Bir Chilarai; 1510–1571 AD) was the 3rd son of Biswa Singha, founder of the Koch Dynasty in the Kamata Kingdom and younger brother of Nara Narayan, the second king of the Koch dynasty of the Kamata kingdom in the 16th century. He was Nara Narayan's commander-in-chief and finance minister (Dewan) of the kingdom. He got his name Chilarai because, as a general, he executed troop movements that were as fast as a chila (kite/Eagle).

== Military career ==
=== Confrontation with Manipur ===
Historical sources suggests that King Naranarayan and Chilarai have defeated the Ahoms. Ripu Singha, the king of Manipur did not resisted the Koch forces under Chilarai, after getting informed about the war between the Ahoms and Koch dynasty. The king surrendered to them and paid twenty thousands of silver rupees, one thousand of gold coins and forty elephants. Besides this, Naranarayan imposed an annual tribute of rupees twenty thousands, three hundred gold coins and ten elephants on the Manipuri king.

=== War with the Jaintia Kingdom ===
The Koch army then marches towards the Kingdom of Jaintia, consisted of the Jaintia Hills and north to the Barak River. Unlike the king of Manipur, the Jaintia king preferred to resist the Koch power and came into an armed conflict with them. He was killed in action during the war. Subsequently, his son ascended the throne and submitted to the Koch. He gave Chilarai a thousand horses, ten thousand silver coins and one thousand gold coins and one hundred special type of Jaintia swords called Khanga, as compensation for the war. The king also agreed to pay an annual tribute of ten thousand silver coins, seventy horses and three hundred Nakoidaos (a special kind of knife).

=== Invasion of Tripura ===
The Vamshavali states that after Chilarai's war with the Jaintia Kingdom, he marched towards Tripura Kingdom with 40,000 soldiers. Historical sources suggests that the king of Tripura was slain in the battlefield, and 18,000 of his soldiers were put to death. The battle fought at Langai in the southern border of Kachar. The dead king's brother surrendered to the Koch paying them ten thousand silver coins, one hundred gold coins and ten horses. He was installed on the throne on the condition of paying an annual tribute of nine thousand gold coins.

=== Invasion of Sylhet ===
Chilarai invaded Sylhet, which was under the rule of the Karrani dynasty of Bengal Sultanate during the reign of Sulaiman Khan Karrani. Sylhet was then administrated by a governor with the rank of Nawab, named Amil, under the allegiance of the Mughals and the Sultan of Bengal. After two days of constant battle, Chilarai rushed and beheaded Amil. Seeing the condition of Amil, his forces retreated away from the battlefield. Amil's brother submitted and paid a large amount of three lakhs of silver rupees, gold coins, horses and elephants to the Koch dynasty. After the victory in Sylhet, Chilarai was returning to his kingdom.

On his way, he defeated a small chiefdom named Dimrua. Panteshwar, the king of Dimrua was imprisoned and released later.

== Religious patronage and character ==
It was only due to his royal patronage that Sankardeva was able to establish the ekasarana-namadharma in Assam and bring about his cultural renaissance.

Several rulers, namely the then king of Manipur and the Khasi tribal chief (Viryyavanta), submitted to Chilaray. Chilaray and his army also vanquished and killed the Jaintia king, and kings of Tippera (Tripura) and Sylhet. Chilaray is said to have never committed brutalities on unarmed common people, and even those kings who surrendered were treated with respect. He was harsh to kings and soldiers who refused to surrender, but neither him nor his brother ever annexed territories or oppressed the common people. They only collected tributes from the vanquished kings. They even treated enemy prisoners kindly, and gave them land-grants to settle.

== Death ==
Chilaray died in 1571 of small pox on the bank of Ganges.

== Bir Chilaray Diwas ==
The birth anniversary of Mahabir Chilaray is organised by Government of Assam annually from 2005. The Government also declares this day as state holiday. It is celebrated on the Purnima of Magh Maah of Hindu Calendar.

== Bir Chilaray award ==
The Directorate of Cultural Affairs, Government of Assam instituted these awards in 2005. They comprise a shawl, a citation, and a cash award of Rs. 100,000
