= Narayanpur, Assam =

Narayanpur Narayanpur Chariali
- block/town
- Nickname: Chariali Town
- Location in Assam, India Narayanpur (India)
- Coordinates: 26°59′47″N 93°53′49″E
- Country: India
- State: Assam
- District: Lakhimpur

Population (2011 l a1)
  - Total: 135,641

Languages
  - Official: Assamese, English
- Time zone: UTC+5:30 (IST)
- PIN: 784164
- Telephone code: (91)3752
- ISO 3166 code: IN-AS
- Vehicle registration: AS-07

Narayanpur is a developmental block (place) located in the Lakhimpur district of the northeastern Indian state of Assam, within the North Lakhimpur subdivision. It falls under the Bihpuria constituency of the Assam Legislative Assembly and is served by the Narayanpur Police Station. The town of Narayanpur, situated at the center of the block, serves as the headquarters of the Deori Autonomous Council, the governing body of the Deori ethnic group. Narayanpur is also notable as the birthplace of Madhavdev.

== Etymology ==
Some scholars believe that the name "Narayanpur" is derived from the Koch garrison set up by Naranarayan during the Ahom-Koch conflict of the 16th century. But, this seems to be incorrect as there is mention of Narayanpur several times before this period. These include the Ahom Buranji (translated by G. C. Barua) and the biography of Madhavdev. The name might actually be derived from a previous dynasty of Narayan i.e. of Chutia kings.

== Geographic location ==
Narayanpur is a small town, situated at the coordinates 26°59′47″N and 93°53'49"E. It is about 54 km to the west of the district headquarters North Lakhimpur. Nearby towns are- Bihpuria to the east, Bandardewa to the north and Gohpur to the west.

== Transport ==
Narayanpur is connected by National Highway 15 to the district headquarters North Lakhimpur (about 54 km) and state capital Guwahati (about 337 km). It is also connected by Northeast Frontier Railway to North Lakhimpur and Guwahati. The nearest railway station is at Tatibahar (about 3 km). The nearest airport is Lilabari (IATA: IXI, ICAO: VELR) (about 58 km).

== Places of interest ==
It is the birthplace of several Baishnava gurus like Madhavdev, Haridev, Anirudhadev, Badala Padma Atta etc., Belaguri Sattra, Badala Sattra, Phulani Thaan, Bishnubalikuchi, Dahgharia Sattra, Budha Bapuchang, Maghnowa Dol, Dongia noi, Gohaikamal Ali, Radhapukhuri, Burhaburhi Pukhuri, Rangati Pukhuri, Naga Pukhuri, Pichala Nadi, Tulugoni jaan are some of the important historical places situated at Narayanpur.

Letekupukhuri/Ujiror Tol Rongajan - the birthplace of famous Vaishnav saint Mahapurush Madhavdev is about 15 km from Narayanpur.

Maghnowa Doul- a temple dating back to Ahom kingdom era is about 7 km from Narayanpur in Maghnowa village. Maghnowa Doul is an important religious and cultural site located in Narayanpur, Assam. It is primarily known for its association with Vaishnavism, which has a strong presence in the region, influenced by the teachings of Srimanta Sankardeva, the founder of the Bhakti movement in Assam.

Religious and Cultural Importance:

1. Vaishnavite Heritage: Maghnowa Doul is a sacred Vaishnavite temple, and like many such sites in Assam, it serves as a place of worship dedicated to Lord Vishnu. It holds a central role in the spiritual and cultural life of the Assamese people, especially in the Narayanpur area.

2. Magh Bihu Festival: The temple is particularly significant during Magh Bihu, an important festival in Assam. This festival, which marks the end of the harvesting season, is celebrated with much enthusiasm in Narayanpur and surrounding areas. Maghnowa Doul is a key site during the celebrations, where devotees gather for prayers, offerings, and cultural events.

3. Community Gathering: The temple acts as a center for religious and community gatherings, where people come together for satsangs (devotional gatherings), kirtans (devotional songs), and other spiritual activities. These events promote unity and a sense of cultural belonging.

4. Cultural Legacy: Maghnowa Doul, like other similar sites, contributes to the cultural richness of Narayanpur. It plays a key role in preserving the traditional practices and rituals of Assamese society, particularly those associated with Vaishnavism.

Conclusion:

Maghnowa Doul holds a place of great religious, cultural, and community significance in Narayanpur. It is a symbol of Assam's rich Vaishnavite tradition and serves as a focal point for the region's spiritual and cultural activities, especially during important festivals like Magh Bihu.

Petuwa Gosani Than, is a historical Than or place of worship during Chutia kingdom is at Dholpur, nearly 7 km from Narayanpur. [Phulani Than, a popular Namghar (Vaishnav temple of Krishna worship) is in the Narayanpur center. Popular believe is that people get their wishes fulfilled when pray in this temple. Panbari Bor Namghar is another important ancient Namghar situated in this region.

- Badala and Belaguri Satras established by Sankardeva is about 0.5 km and 1.5 km respectively from Narayanpur.

There are two big ancient ponds Radhapukhuri and Rangati pukhuri located near Narayanpur.

- Madhabdev Thaan (Leteku Pukhuri/Ujiror Tol Rongajan) is located at the near Borbali. It is the birthplace of Madhabdev (1489 AD). There are two big thaans adjacent to each other one Letekupukhuri other at Rongajan. Followers of both these thaans demand it to be the birthplace of Madhabdev.

The thaans have a huge collection of holy books, ancient manuscripts and cultural heritages.

- Maghnoa Doul is located at the Phulbari village and also known as Phulbari Doul. This is situated at the East side of the Pichola River and at the bank of Maghnoa Beel. Once it was a major place of worshiping Kali (goddess of power) and a pilgrimage place. Several Ahom kings are also known to have visited the place. During the Maan invasion the idol was kept hidden but was never returned to the Doul. It was established at the present location at Bor Kalika Thaan near Dholpur.

The Doul has a boundary wall of about 5 feet height. The main Doul is about 75 feet in height. Inside the Doul is the Bulani Ghar where the idol was used to be kept. The inside wall contains various sculptures. But due to the negligence of the government as well as the local people, most of the idols and valuable items had been stolen already. Recently the Archeological Department has done a repairing work to the Doul.

=== Khamti Village and Bapuchang ===
In 1843, the British controlled the Khamti Revolution in Sadia and settled few Khamti people at Narayanpur. They established this Buddha temple at Barkhamti. The Khamti village will be extensively discussed in the next section of this project. Its worthwhile to mention that this village contains some the Khamtis which are only left to a few thousand in number. The people are Buddhist by religion and have a rich cultural heritage.

The religious temple of the Khamtis is called the Bapuchang. It is same as the Buddhist temple or Buddha Bihar found among the Buddhist communities around the world. It is somewhat different from the normal Khamti houses. The raised platform is made of wood and the roof is made of thresh. The outer architecture resembles to the Buddhist temples of Myanmar. Buddha idols are kept inside the Bapuchang and it is regarded as a very holy place.

=== Deotola ===
The ancient idol of the Maghnoa Doul was hidden in a pond during the Maan invasion. The idol was later recovered from Gavoru Beel of Kherajkhat. As the idol was later established at the Bor-Kalaika Thaan, this place become known as Deotola (Deo- God, Tola- to lift). This place is at 8 km distance from Narayanpur.

=== Petua-Gosani Thaan ===
It took a long time for the British to take the control of the Lakhimpur region after they invaded Assam. This than was an old place of worshiping Kaali Goddess and was discovered by the British. It is located near Dholpur at Ganakdalani. The goddess of this is called Kesai-khaiti. In earlier times the Daphala people from Arunachal Pradesh used to come here for pilgrimage. Still, Durga puja is celebrated at this than regularly.

=== Belaguri Satra ===
This Satra was established in 1618 originally in Majuli Island- where the two great guru and disciples Sri Sri Sankardev and Sri Sri Madhabdev met each other for the first time. This Satra was transferred to Narayanpur and settled at Jorabari revenue village in 1947 AD. This Satra is very well known among the people of Assam. The "Chaali" dance of form is a famous traditional dance of Assam.

=== Bodula Satra and Phulani Than ===
This satra was established in Narayanpur in 1636 AD by Badala Padma Ataa who was a great follower of Mahapurush Madhabdev. It is said that Padma Ataa got the responsibility of the upper Assam under Madhabdev and established the Satra at the land of Jamadagni. Once upon a time this Satra was the center for the Baishnavism. Badala Padma Ataa was next to Sankardev and Madhabdev who took the great responsibility after the demise of these two holy figures. The Satra has a rich collection of ancient manuscripts.

The Phulani thaan was also established by Badala Atta in 1555 saka. This is an important religious place and a large no of followers visit this thaan annually.

=== Bishnu Balikunchi Satra ===
It is situated at the Dakua village, 8 km from Nagpur. The disciple of Kal Sanghati guru Bhabanipuria Atta, Sri Sri Anirudhadev was born at Dakua village near Narayanpur in 1553 AD. He established this Satra with the help of Bhabapuria Ataa in 1602 AD. Aniruddhadev died in this Satra. He was the holy person who turned the Moran and Motok people into Baishanivism.

=== Radha Pukhuri ===
Radhapukhuri Tank is situated at the Sawkuchi village near Narayanpur. It was constructed by the Chutia King Lakhminarayan in between 1400 and 1500 AD in the name of his wife ‘Radha’. Some scholars also argue that it was constructed by Queen Sarbeswari. But the construction work ended in halfway and hence it was named as Adhapukhuri (adha means half) which eventually changed to Radhapukhuri.

Presently this tank is used for fish breeding and cultivation by the Fisheries Department, Government of Assam.

=== Bhatoukuchi Thaan ===
Bhatoukuci Thaan is located at Kathani village near Dholpur. This was established by Keshabsaran Bhatoukuchia Ataa. According to Kathagurucharit he was born in 1605 and died in 1665. This thaan is still functioning in full fledge.

=== Akadohia Pukhuri ===
This big pond is situated at the Kachua village near Dholpur. A holy Brahmin guru called Akadoshi used to live near the pond and hence this name became famous. Bhatoukuci Thaan is located at Kathani village near Dholpur. This was established by Keshabsaran Bhatoukuchia Ataa. According to Kathagurucharit he was born in 1605 and died in 1665. This thaan is still functioning in full fledge.

=== Gohai-Kamal Ali ===
The Koch Kingdom was established at the early part of the 16th century. This kingdom was extended from Kortuaa River to Bornodi. Kochbihar (now in West Bengal) was made the capital of the kingdom and this road was made to fight with the Ahoms.

=== Ahotguri Satra ===
This satra is situated at Borbali Samua Gaon. It was established by Sri Ram Ata in 1683. Most of the disciples are Brahmin. The ancient manuscript of this Satra got spoiled during the flood in 1987. At present it has a collection of manuscripts by Sankardev Thakur Ataa and Sri Ram Ataa.

=== Madhabdev Kalakshetra ===
The government of Assam has announced in 2006 the construction of Madhabdev Kalakshetra at Badala Sattra at Narayanpur and the foundation stone has been laid down near Narayanpur. The Chief Minister of Assam, Tarun Gogoi, laid the foundation Stone of the Kalakshetra. The Madhabdev Kalakshetra was officially opened in May 2023.

=== Other attractions ===
Narayanpur is the birthplace of twelve holy gurus of Assam and hence regarded as a very holy place. It was the center of [Vaishnavism] during the era of [Madhabdev]. Apart from the religious and geographical attractions mentioned so far, it has an entire gamut of other attractions which have the full potential to become a tourist destination. Some of such attractions are Govind Mandir of Nepali people, Sakrahi Thaan, Dahgharia Satra, Sialmara Satra, Dharamgarh Ashram, Homora Thaan, Deberapar Satra etc.

== Economy ==
Greater Narayanpur area has very fertile land suitable for agricultural production- mainly Rice, Maah (Lentil), Potato, Onion, Garlic, Ginger, Tomatoes, Cauliflower, Cabbage, Brinjal and other vegetables. Different fruits like banana, berries, Mangoes, Coconuts, Tamol (Areca nuts) etc. are produced in abundance in the region. Fisheries play a significant role towards the socio-economic upliftment of the common people of Narayanpur development block. Till recent times, Muga (Assam silk) production was quite common rural cottage industry. Narayanpur has a Muga silkworm seed production unit under Central Silk Board, with its headquarters at Guwahati. However, the present condition of this seed farm does not seem to be very good.

== Education ==
Narayanpur has many reputed schools and educational institutes that have produced many successful personalities in various fields like education, media, medicine, engineering, administrative services, defence services etc. Madhabdev College and Narayanpur Higher Secondary school are situated near Narayanpur which caters for the higher education needs of the local population. Many professionals from Narayanpur are working in different fields all over India and many other countries. Writers and poets from Narayanpur have significant contribution to the Assamese literature.

Some notable educational institutions are:

Government institutes:

- Madhabdev University
- Narayanpur Higher Secondary School
- Dhalpur Higher Secondary school
- Harmoti Pichala High School
- Pichalaguri Higher Secondary School (Jarabari)
- Tatibahar High School
- Namani Subansiri Higher Secondary School
- Pichala National Academy

Private institutes:

- Sankardev Shishu Bidya Niketan
- Jigyasha Jatiya Vidyalaya
- Ekrit Academy
- Gyanjyoti Academy
- Sankardev Jatiya Vidyalaya

Private Computer-Technology Training institutes:

The first private computer training institute of the region was established in 1996. The name of this institute is "National Institute of Computer and Vocational Training Centre". There are a couple of IT institutes like CEC, EKRIT, APTECH, NBCE in Narayanpur.
