= Gungmindang =

- Hangul: 국민당
- Hanja: 國民黨
- RR: Gungmindang
- MR: Kungmindang

Gungminuidang
- Hangul: 국민의당
- Hanja: 國民의黨
- RR: Gungminuidang
- MR: Kungminŭidang

Gungminjeongdang
- Hangul: 국민정당
- Hanja: 國民政黨
- RR: Gungminjeongdang
- MR: Kungminjŏngdang
- sometimes known as "Gukmindang", "Gunkminuidang" and "Gukminjeongdang".

Gungmindang (Korean: 국민당), Gungminuidang (국민의당), or Gungminjeongdang (Korean: 국민정당), literally Nationalist Party (or People's Party/People Party) may also refer to:

== Korea (until 1948) ==
- Korean Nationalist Party (1928), political party in 1928.
- Nationalist Party, also known as Korean Nationalist Party, political party from 1945 to 1947.
- Korean Women's Nationalist Party, political party from 1945 to 1960.

== South Korea (1948-) ==
- Korea Nationalist Party, political party from 1949 to 1958.
- Democratic Nationalist Party (South Korea), political party from 1949 to 1955.
- People's Party (South Korea, 1963), political party from 1963 to 1964.
- Nationalist Party (South Korea), political party from 1971 to 1972.
- Korean National Party, political party from 1981 to 1987.
- Unification People's Party, political party from 1992 to 1994.
- People's New Party (South Korea), political party from 1997 to 1998.
- Democratic People's Party (South Korea), political party from 2000 to 2004.
- People's Party for Reform, political party from 2002 to 2004.
- People Party (South Korea, 2016), political party from 2016 to 2018.
- People Party (South Korea), political party since 2020.

== See also ==
- National Congress for New Politics, political party from 1995 to 2000.
- Participation Party (South Korea), political party from 2010 to 2011.
- Korea Vision Party, political party 2012.
- Gongsandang (disambiguation)
- Jinbodang (disambiguation)
- Kuomintang
- Minjudang (disambiguation)
- Nodongdang (disambiguation)
- Sinmindang (disambiguation)
