= Gongsan =

Gongsan may refer to:

- Gongsan-dong, neighbourhood of Dong-gu, Daegu, South Korea
- Palgongsan, mountain in southeastern South Korea
- Gongju, city in South Chungcheong, South Korea
- Gongsan-myeon, township in Naju, South Jeolla, South Korea; see list of townships in South Korea

People with the name Gongsan include:

- Deng Guangming (1907–1998), courtesy name Gongsan, Chinese historian

== See also ==
- Gongsandang (disambiguation)
- Gongsan Dam, dam in Daegu, South Korea
