= Gonghwadang =

- Hangul: 공화당
- Hanja: 共和黨
- RR: Gonghwadang
- MR: Konghwadang

Gonghwadang (Korean: 공화당) or Konghwadang literally the Republican Party, may refer to:

- Democratic Republican Party (South Korea)
- New Democratic Republican Party
- Our Republican Party (2017)
- Our Republican Party (2020)

== See also ==
- Jinbodang (disambiguation)
- Minjudang (disambiguation)
- Conservatism in South Korea
