= Dohak =

Dohak may refer to:

- Deyhuk, village also spelled Dohak, capital of Deyhuk District, Iran
- Dohak-dong, dong (neighbourhood) of Daegu, South Korea
- Mubarak Dohak, Malay royal in Negeri Sembilan

== See also ==
- Duhak, village in Bilaspur District, Himachal Pradesh, India
