= Sinmindang =

- Hangul: 신민당
- Hanja: 新民黨
- RR: Sinmindang
- MR: Sinmindang

Sinmindang (Korean: 신민당; lit. new democratic party) may refer to:

- New People's Party of Korea (16 February 1946–23 November 1946)
- New Democratic Party (South Korea) (1967–1980)
- New Korea Democratic Party (1985–1988), informally known as Sinmindang
- New United Democratic Party (1991), informally known as Sinmindang

== See also ==
- Liberalism in South Korea
- Conservatism in South Korea
- Jinbodang (disambiguation)
- Minjudang (disambiguation)
- Nodongdang (disambiguation)
