= New People =

New People may refer to:

- New People (Cambodia), Cambodians in Democratic Kampuchea
- The New People, 1969 US TV show
- Neues Volk, Nazi newspaper
- New People (political party), Russian political party
- New People (film distributor)

== See also ==
- New People's Party (disambiguation)
