= Gongsandang =

- Hangul: 공산당
- Hanja: 共産黨
- RR: Gongsandang
- MR: Kongsandang

Gongsandang (Korean: 공산당), literally Communist Party may also refer to:

- All Russia Communist Party of Korea (1919-1922)
- Communist Party of Korea (Sanghai) (1921-1922)
- Communist Party of Masan (1924-1925)
- Communist Party of Korea (1925-1928, 1945–1946)

== See also ==
- Jinbodang (disambiguation)
- Minjudang (disambiguation)
- Nodongdang (disambiguation)
