= Five Dynasties and Ten Kingdoms period =

Period of Chinese history (907–979)

Five Dynasties and Ten Kingdoms 907–960
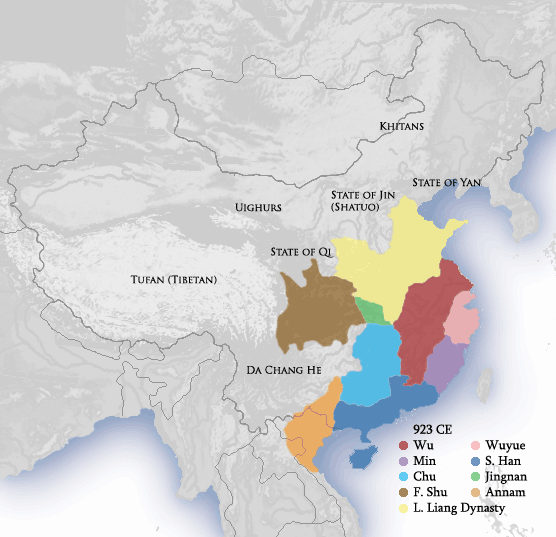
- The Later Liang (yellow) and contemporary kingdoms
- Traditional Chinese: 五代十國
- Simplified Chinese: 五代十国
Transcriptions
Standard Mandarin
- Hanyu Pinyin: Wǔ dài shí guó
- Wade–Giles: Wu^{3} tai^{4} shih^{2} kuo^{2}
- IPA: [ù.tâɪ.ʂɻ.kwǒ]
Yue: Cantonese
- Yale Romanization: Ng^{5} doi^{6} sap^{6} gwok^{3}
- IPA: [ŋ tɔj˨ sɐp̚˨ kʷɔk̚˧]

The Five Dynasties and Ten Kingdoms Period (Chinese: 五代十國) was an era of political upheaval and division in Imperial China from 907 to 979 AD. Five dynastic states quickly succeeded one another in the Central Plain, and more than a dozen concurrent dynastic states, of which the most powerful and influential ten were known as the ten kingdoms, were established elsewhere, mainly in South China. It was a prolonged period of multiple political divisions in Chinese imperial history.

Traditionally, the era is seen as beginning with the fall of the Tang dynasty in 907 and reaching its climax with the founding of the Song dynasty in 960. In the following 19 years, Song gradually subdued the remaining states in South China, but the Liao dynasty still remained in China's north (eventually succeeded by the Jin dynasty), and the Western Xia was eventually established in China's northwest.

Many states had been de facto independent long before 907 as the late Tang dynasty's control over its numerous fanzhen officials waned, but the key event was their recognition as sovereign by foreign powers. After the Tang collapsed, several warlords of the Central Plain crowned themselves emperor. During the 70-year period, there was near-constant warfare between the emerging kingdoms and the alliances they formed. All had the ultimate goal of controlling the Central Plain and establishing themselves as the Tang's successor.

The last of the Five Dynasties and Ten Kingdoms regimes was Northern Han, which held out until Song conquered it in 979. For the next several centuries, although the Song controlled much of South China, they coexisted alongside the Liao dynasty, Jin dynasty, and various other regimes in China's north, until finally all of them were conquered by the Yuan dynasty.

== Background ==
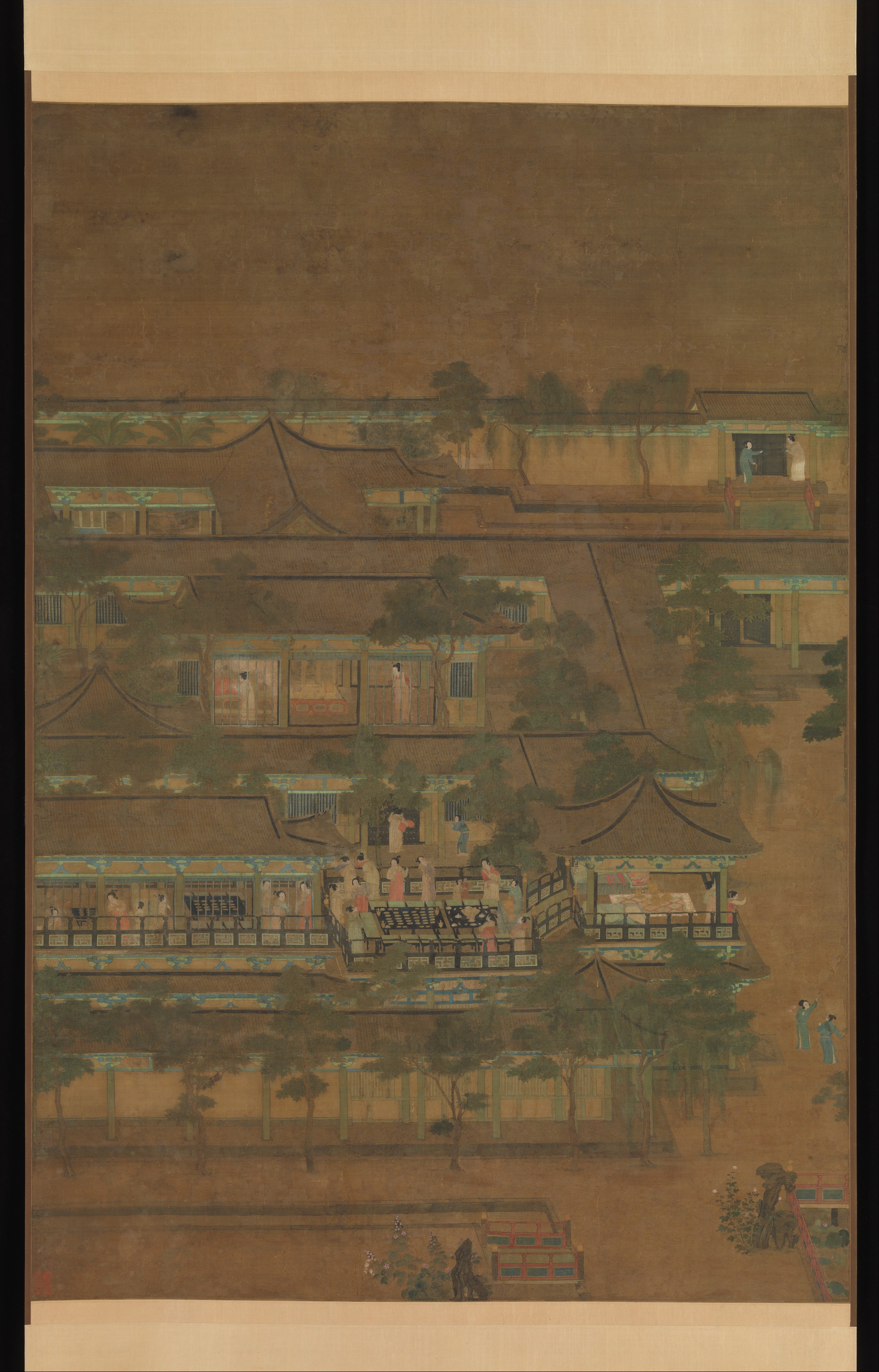
Palace Banquet by Anonymous, Five Dynasties and Ten Kingdoms period, 10th century

In the 8th century, the An Lushan (755–763 CE) and Huang Chao rebellions weakened the imperial government.

Due to the decline of Tang central authority after the An Lushan Rebellion, large regional administrations began to be superimposed over the old districts and prefectures that had been standard practice for the previous millennium, ever since the Qin dynasty (221–206 BCE). These administrations, known as circuit commissions, would become the boundaries of the later Southern regimes; many circuit commissioners became the emperors or kings of these states.

By the early 10th century, in the last decades of the Tang dynasty, the imperial government granted increased powers to the jiedushi (Chinese: 節度使), the regional military governors, who commanded de facto independence from its authority. They were not even appointed by the central court anymore, but developed hereditary systems, from father to son or from patron to protégé. They had their own armies rivaling the "palace armies" and amassed huge wealth, as testified by their sumptuous tombs.

The historian Hugh Clark has proposed a three-stage model of broad political trends during this time period:

- First Stage (880–910) — The period between the Huang Chao Rebellion and the formal end of the Tang dynasty, with chaotic fighting between warlords who controlled approximately one or two prefectures each.
- Second Stage (910–950) — The various warlords stabilize and gain enough legitimacy to proclaim new dynasties.
- Third Stage (950–979) — The forceful reunification of China by the Later Zhou dynasty and its successor the Song dynasty, and the demilitarisation of the provinces.

In this model, Southern China, divided into several independent dynastic kingdoms, was more stable than the North, which experienced constant regime change. Consequently, the Southern kingdoms were able to embark on trade, land reclamation, and infrastructure projects, laying the groundwork for the Song Dynasty economic boom. This economic shift to the south also led to a vast southward migration.

=== North ===
According to Nicholas Tackett, the three provinces of Hebei (Chengde, Youzhou, Weibo) were able to maintain much greater autonomy from the central government in the aftermath of the An Lushan rebellion. With their administration under local military control, these provinces never submitted tax revenues, and governorships lapsed into hereditary succession. They engaged in occasional war with the central government, or against each other, and Youzhou seemed to conduct its own foreign policy. This meant that the culture of these northeastern provinces started diverging from the capital. Many of the elites in post-Tang China, including the future emperors of the Song dynasty, came from this region.

The administrations of the Five Dynasties and the early Song Dynasty shared a pattern of being disproportionately drawn from the families of military governors in northern and northwestern China (Hebei, Shanxi, Shaanxi), their personal staff, and the bureaucrats who served in the capitals of the Five dynasties. These families had risen to prominence due to the unraveling of central authority after the An Lushan Rebellion, despite lacking esteemed ancestry. The historian Deng Xiaonan argued that many of these military families, including the Song imperial family, were of mixed Han Chinese-Turkic-Kumo Xi ancestry.

The term "Five Dynasties" was coined by Song dynasty historians and reflects the view that the successive regimes based in Kaifeng, controlled the Central Plain and possessed the Mandate of Heaven. The first of the Five Dynasties was founded by Zhu Wen, the rebel defector turned warlord who ultimately ended the Tang dynasty. The rest of the Five Dynasties as well as the Song dynasty all emerged from a military organization originally led by Shatuo Turks whose commanders replaced each other in frequent coup d'état. The Later Tang was founded by Li Cunxu, the son of Shatuo leader Li Keyong, who was the main military rival to Zhu Wen in the late Tang. The Later Jin founder Shi Jingtang was the son of a Shatuo commander in Li Keyong's army and became the son-in-law of the Later Tang general and emperor Li Siyuan, who was himself an adopted son of Li Keyong. The Later Han founder Liu Zhiyuan was a Shatuo officer under Li Siyuan and Shi Jintang. The father of the Later Zhou founder Guo Wei fought in Li Keyong's army and Guo served under Liu Zhiyuan. The father of Song founder Zhao Kuangyin served in the armies of Later Tang, Later Han, and Later Zhou. Zhao, also a professional soldier, rose through the ranks of the Later Zhou before seizing the throne in the Chenqiao Mutiny in 960, which ended the era of the Five Dynasties.

The Qing historian Wang Fuzhi (1619–1692) wrote that this period could be compared to the earlier Warring States period of ancient China, remarking that none of the rulers could be described as "Son of Heaven". The Five Dynasties' rulers, despite claiming the status of emperor, sometimes dealt with each other on terms of diplomatic equality out of pragmatic concern. This concept of "sharing the Mandate of Heaven" as "sibling states" was the result of the brief balance of power. After the reunification of China by the Song dynasty, the Song embarked on a special effort to denounce such arrangements.

=== South ===
The Southern regimes generally had more stable and effective government during this period. Even the rulers of the Southern states were almost all military leaders from the North with their key officers and elite forces also hailing from the North since the bulk of the Tang army was based in the North. The founders of Wu and Former Shu were 'rogues' from Huainan and Xuchang respectively, the founder of Min was a minor government staffer from Huainan, the founder of Wuyue was a 'rogue' from Hangzhou, the founder of Chu was (according to one source) a carpenter from Xuchang, the founder of Jingnan was a slave from Shanzhou and the founder of Southern Han was a southern tribal chief. The Southern kingdoms were founded by men of low social status who rose up through superior military ability, who were later scorned as "bandits" by future scholars. However, once established, these rulers took great pains to portray themselves as promoters of culture and economic development so as to legitimize their rule; many wooed former Tang courtiers to help administer their states.

The economies of each of the southern regions had prospered in the late Tang. Guangdong and Fujian were the sites of important port cities trading exotic goods, the middle Yangtze and Sichuan were centers of tea and porcelain production, and the Yangtze delta was a center of extremely high agricultural production and an entrepot for the other regions. The regions were economically interdependent. Sui and Tang's policies, while paying little attention to developing the South, gave the South room to innovate free of tight administrative controls. The dominant northern officials had been unwilling to serve in the South during the Tang, and so southerners were recruited by the Tang to serve in a local capacity under the "Southern Selection" supplemental system. These southern officials became the administrative core of the Ten Kingdoms and later dominated the bureaucracy by the mid-Song.

== Significant jiedushi ==
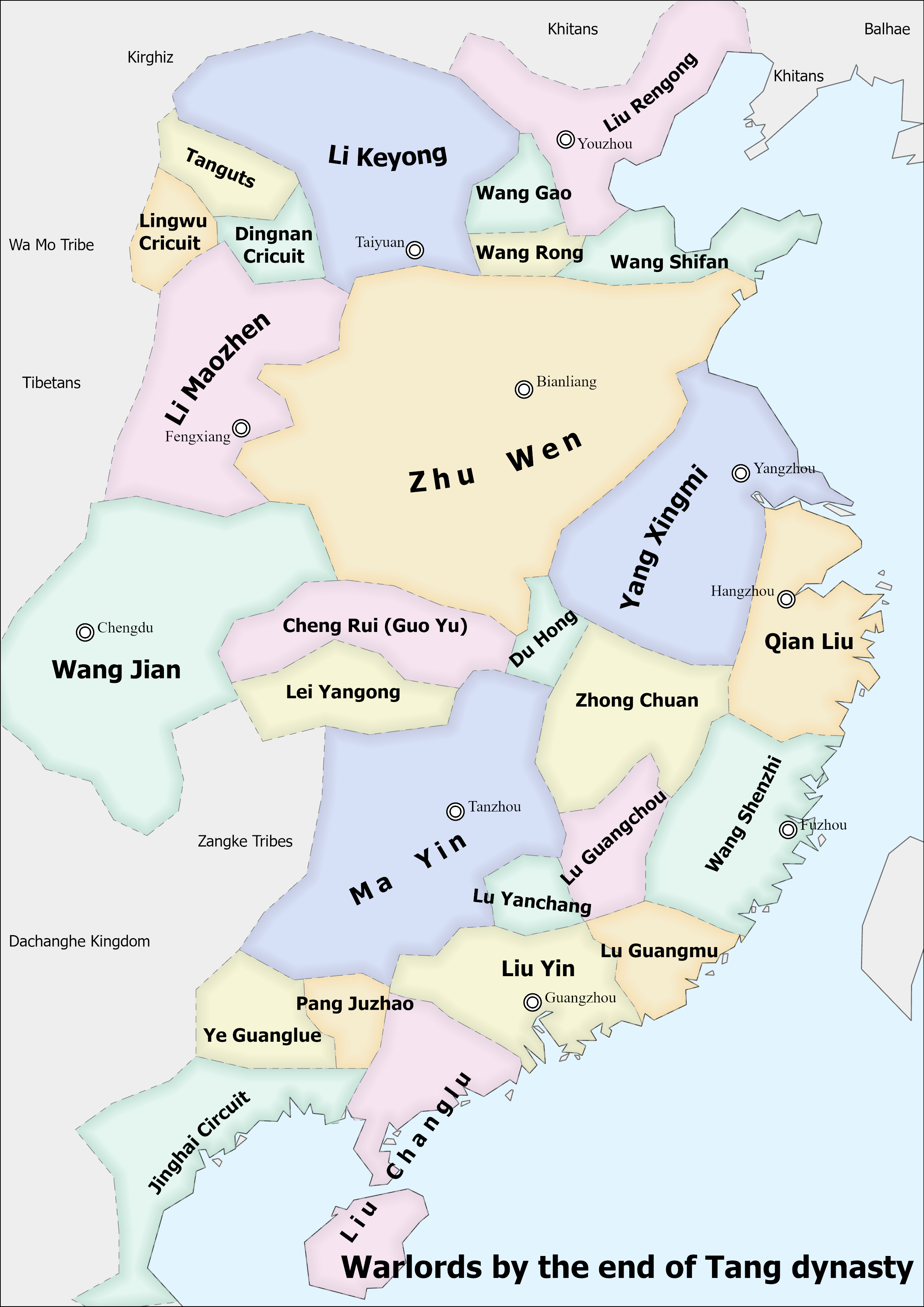
Map of warlords ("jiedushi") in 902, before the end of Tang dynasty

North China

- Wang Rong at Zhenzhou (modern Zhengding County, Hebei province)
- Wang Chuzhi at Dingzhou (modern Dingzhou, Hebei)
- Li Keyong and Li Cunxu at Taiyuan (modern Taiyuan, Shanxi), precursor to Later Tang
- Liu Rengong and Liu Shouguang at Youzhou (modern Beijing), precursor to Yan
- Li Maozhen at Fengxiang (modern Fengxiang County, Shaanxi province), precursor to Qi
- Luo Shaowei at Weibo (modern Daming County, Hebei province)
- Li Sigong at Dingnan circuit, precursor to Western Xia
- Zhang Yichao at Guiyi
- Zhu Wen at Bianzhou (modern Kaifeng, Henan), precursor to Later Liang

South China

- Qian Liu at Hangzhou (modern Hangzhou, Zhejiang), precursor to Wuyue
- Ma Yin at Tanzhou (modern Changsha, Hunan), precursor to Chu
- Wang Shenzhi at Fuzhou (modern Fuzhou, Fujian), precursor to Min
- Liu Yin at Guangzhou (modern Guangzhou, Guangdong), precursor to Southern Han
- Wang Jian at Chengdu (modern Chengdu, Sichuan), precursor to Former Shu
- Yang Xingmi at Yangzhou (modern Yangzhou, Jiangsu), precursor to Wu
- Gao Jixing at Jingzhou, precursor to Jingnan

== Five Dynasties ==
=== Later Liang (907–923) ===
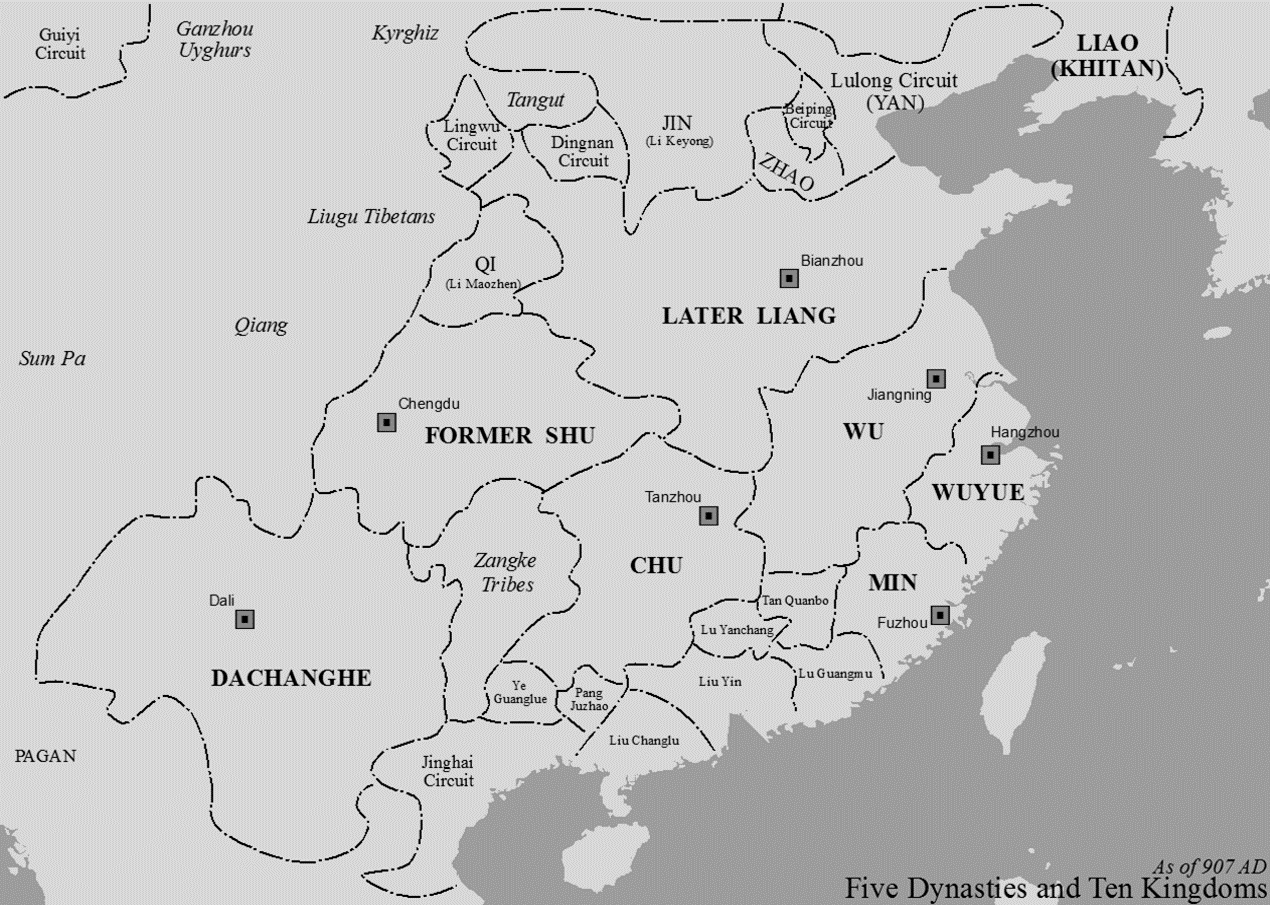
Later Liang in 907 CE

During the Tang dynasty, the warlord Zhu Wen was originally a member of Huang Chao's rebel army, he took on a crucial role in suppressing the Huang Chao Rebellion. For this function, he was awarded the Xuanwu Jiedushi title. Within a few years, he had consolidated his power by destroying neighbours and forcing the move of the imperial capital to Luoyang, which was within his region of influence. In 904, he executed Emperor Zhaozong of Tang and made Zhaozong's 13-year-old son Emperor Ai of Tang a subordinate ruler. Three years later, he induced the boy emperor to abdicate in his favour. He then proclaimed himself emperor, thus beginning the Later Liang.

=== Later Tang (923–936) ===
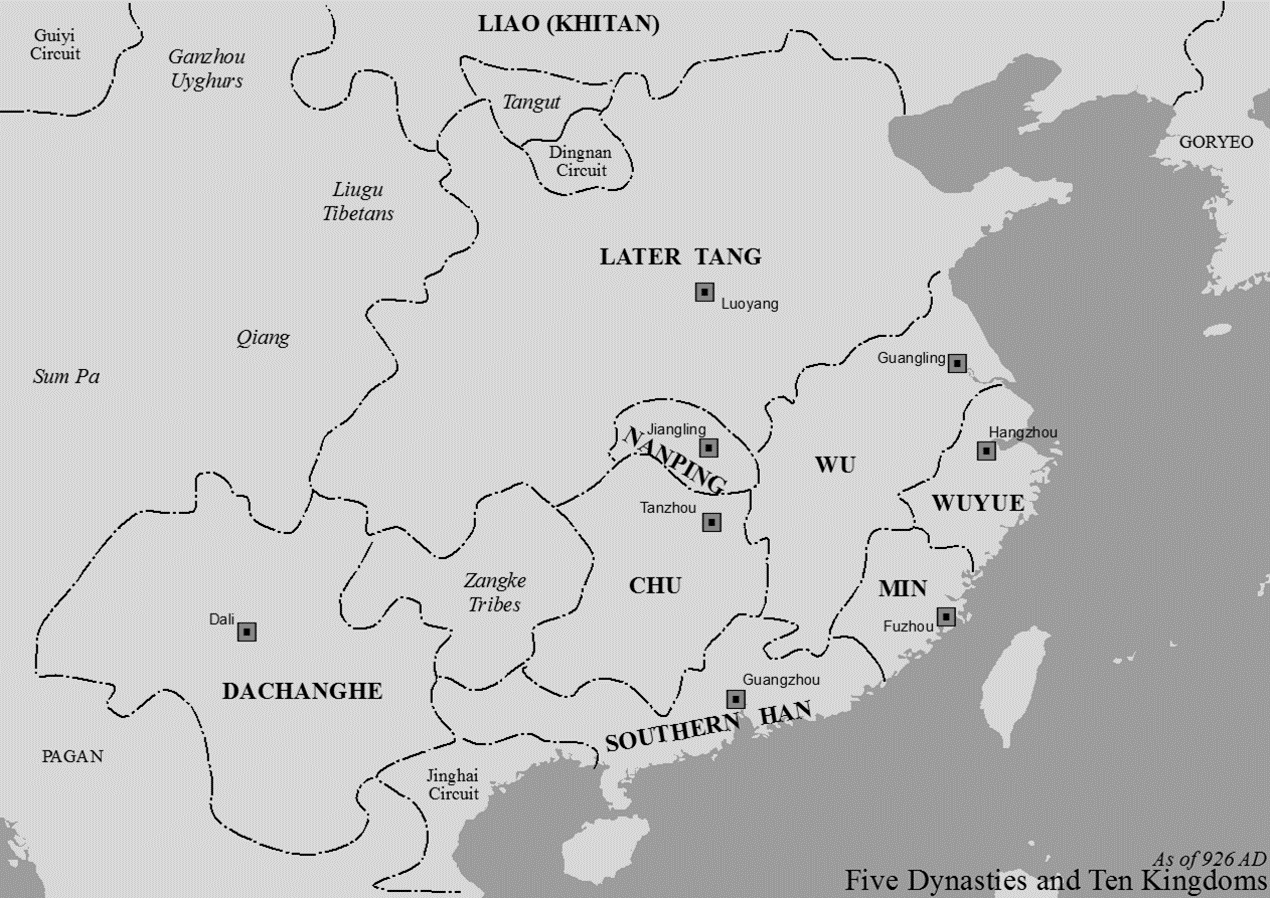
Later Tang in 926 CE

In the final years of the Tang dynasty, rival warlords declared independence in the provinces they governed—not all of which recognized the emperor's authority. Li Keyong was the jiedushi for the Hedong circuit in present Shanxi, forming a polity called Jin (晉). His son Li Cunxu and Liu Shouguang fiercely fought the regime forces to conquer northern China; Li Cunxu succeeded. He defeated Liu Shouguang (who had proclaimed a Yan Empire in 911) in 915, and declared himself emperor in 923; within a few months, he brought down the Later Liang regime. Thus began the Shatuo Later Tang—the first in a long line of conquest dynasties. After reuniting much of northern China, in 924 Cunxu received the submission of Shaanxi's Qi kingdom, and in 925 Cunxu conquered the Former Shu, a regime that had been set up in Sichuan.

=== Later Jin (937–947) ===
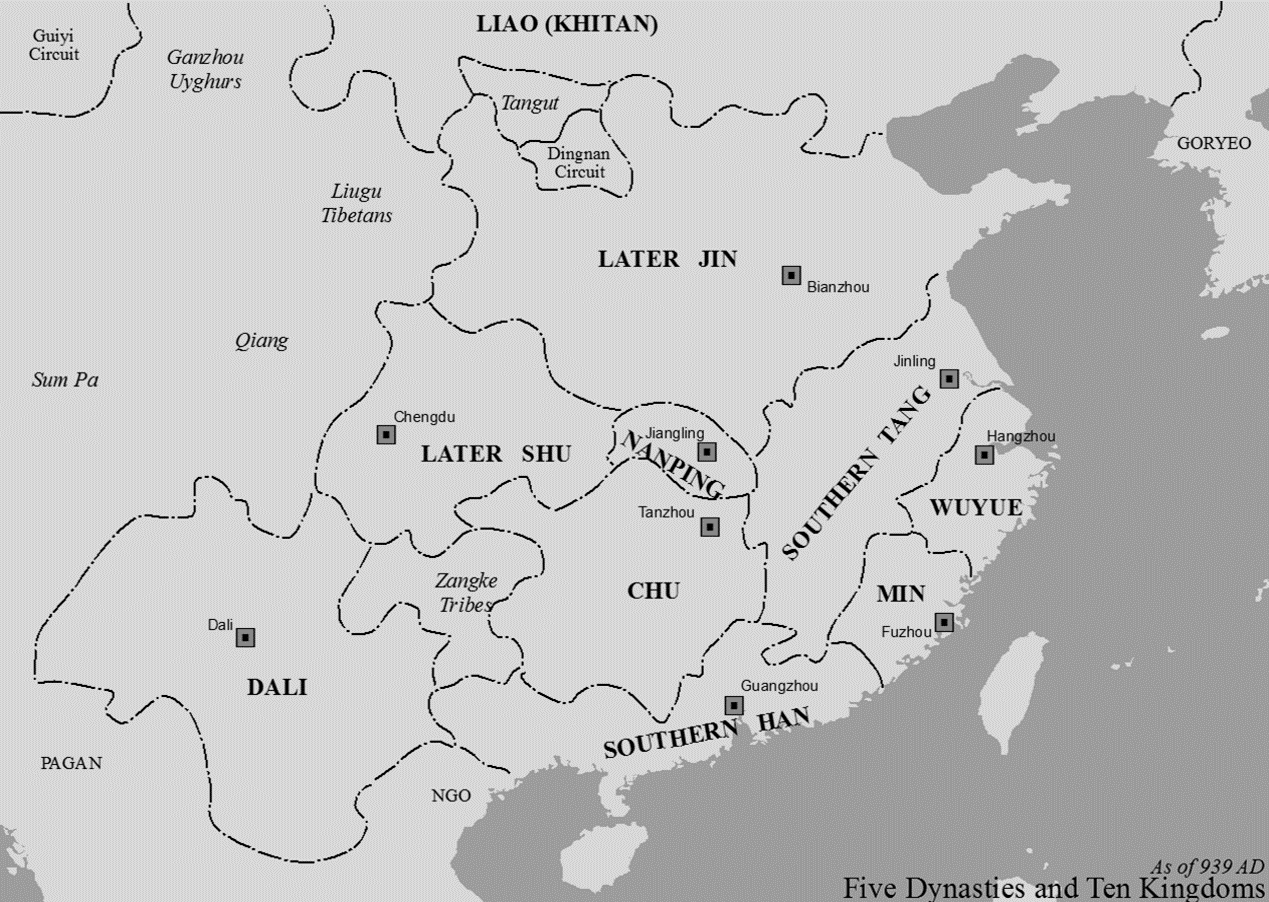
Later Jin in 939 CE

The Later Tang had a few years of relative calm, followed by unrest. In 934, Sichuan again asserted independence. In 936, Shi Jingtang rebelled against Li Congke, the fourth emperor of the Later Tang. Shi Jingtang, a Shatuo jiedushi from Taiyuan, was aided by the Khitan-led Liao dynasty in his rebellion. In return for their aid, Shi Jingtang promised annual tribute and the Sixteen Prefectures (modern northern Hebei and Beijing) to the Khitans. The rebellion succeeded, and Shi Jingtang became emperor in this same year.

Not long after the founding of Later Jin, the Liao came to regard the emperor as a proxy ruler for China. In 943, the Khitans declared war and within three years seized the capital, Kaifeng, marking the end of Later Jin. But while they had conquered vast regions of China, the Khitans were unable or unwilling to control those regions and retreated from them early in the next year.

=== Later Han (947–951) ===
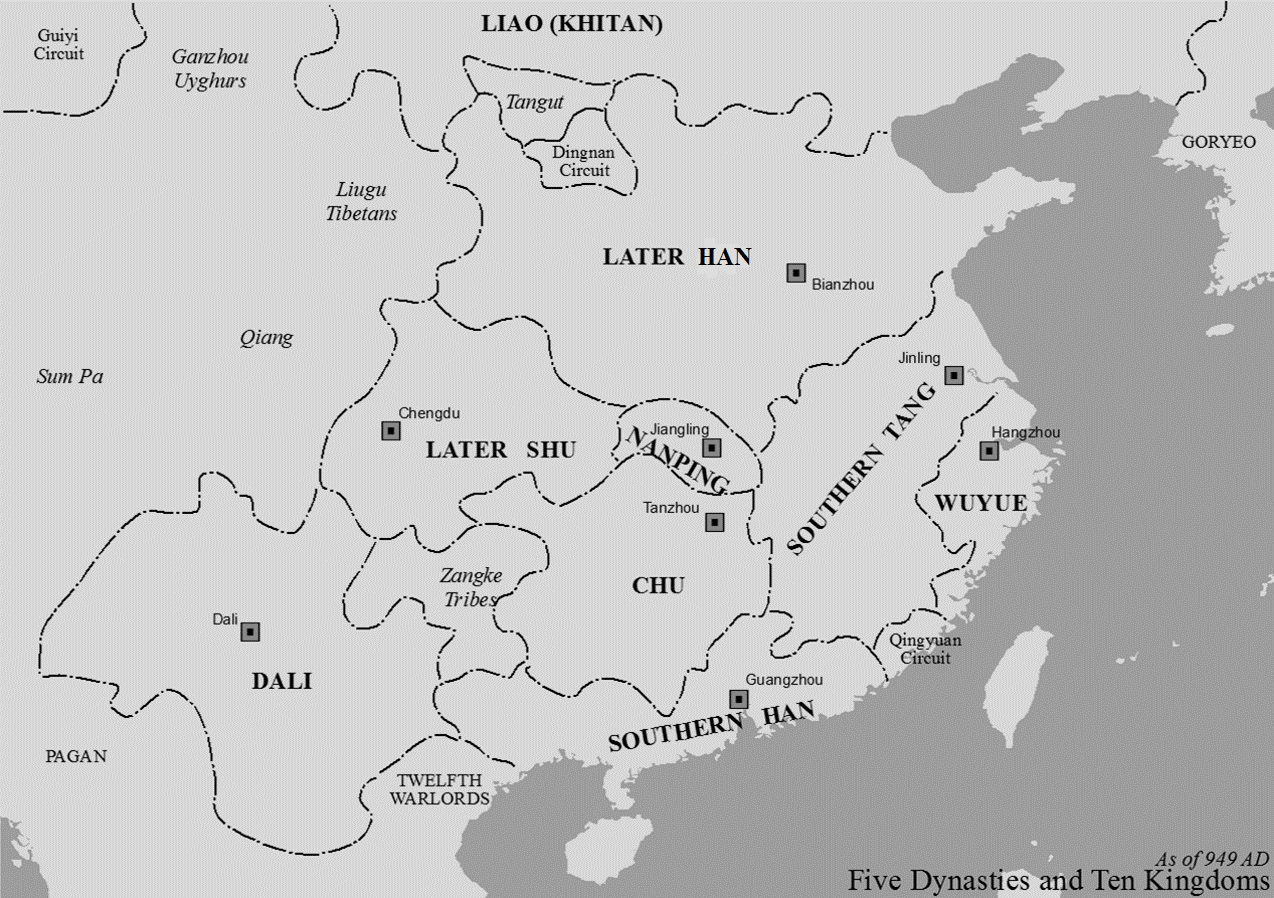
Later Han in 949 CE

To fill the power vacuum, the jiedushi Liu Zhiyuan entered the imperial capital in 947 and proclaimed the advent of the Later Han, establishing a third successive Shatuo reign. This was the shortest of the five dynasties. Following a coup in 951, General Guo Wei, a Han Chinese, was enthroned, thus beginning the Later Zhou. However, Liu Chong, a member of the Later Han imperial family, established a rival Northern Han regime in Taiyuan and requested Khitan aid to defeat the Later Zhou.

=== Later Zhou (951–960) ===
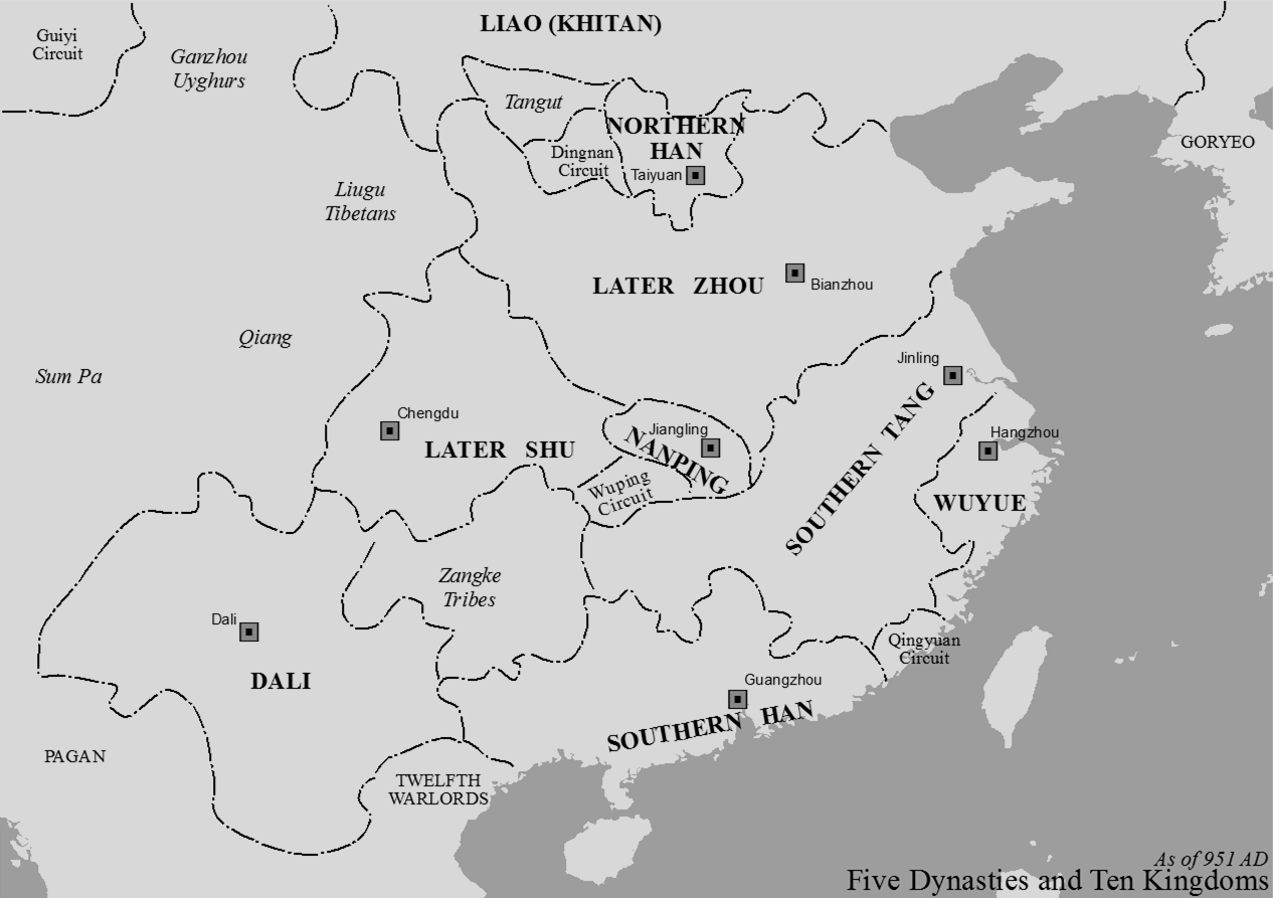
Later Zhou in 951 CE

After the death of Guo Wei in 954, his adopted son Chai Rong succeeded the throne and began a policy of expansion and reunification. One month after Chai Rong took the throne, Liu Chong, Emperor of Northern Han, allied with Liao dynasty to launch an assault on Later Zhou. Against the advice of Minister Feng Dao, Chai Rong decided to lead his army against the incursion. When Chai Rong engaged Liu Chong at Gao Ping (in modern Jincheng), two of Chai's generals, Fan Aineng and He Hui, fled from the battlefield along with their troops. At this critical moment, Chai Rong risked his life to break through the defense and crushed Liu's forces. After this campaign, Chai Rong consolidated his power. Between 956 and 958, forces of Later Zhou conquered much of Southern Tang, the most powerful regime in southern China, which ceded all the territory north of the Yangtze in defeat. In 959, Chai Rong attacked the Liao in an attempt to recover territories ceded during the Later Jin. After many victories, he succumbed to illness.

In 960, the general Zhao Kuangyin staged a coup and took the throne for himself, founding the Northern Song dynasty. This is the official end of the Five Dynasties and Ten Kingdoms period. During the next two decades, Zhao Kuangyin and his successor Zhao Kuangyi defeated the other remaining regimes in South China, conquering Northern Han in 979, starting the Song dynasty era in 982.

== Ten Kingdoms ==
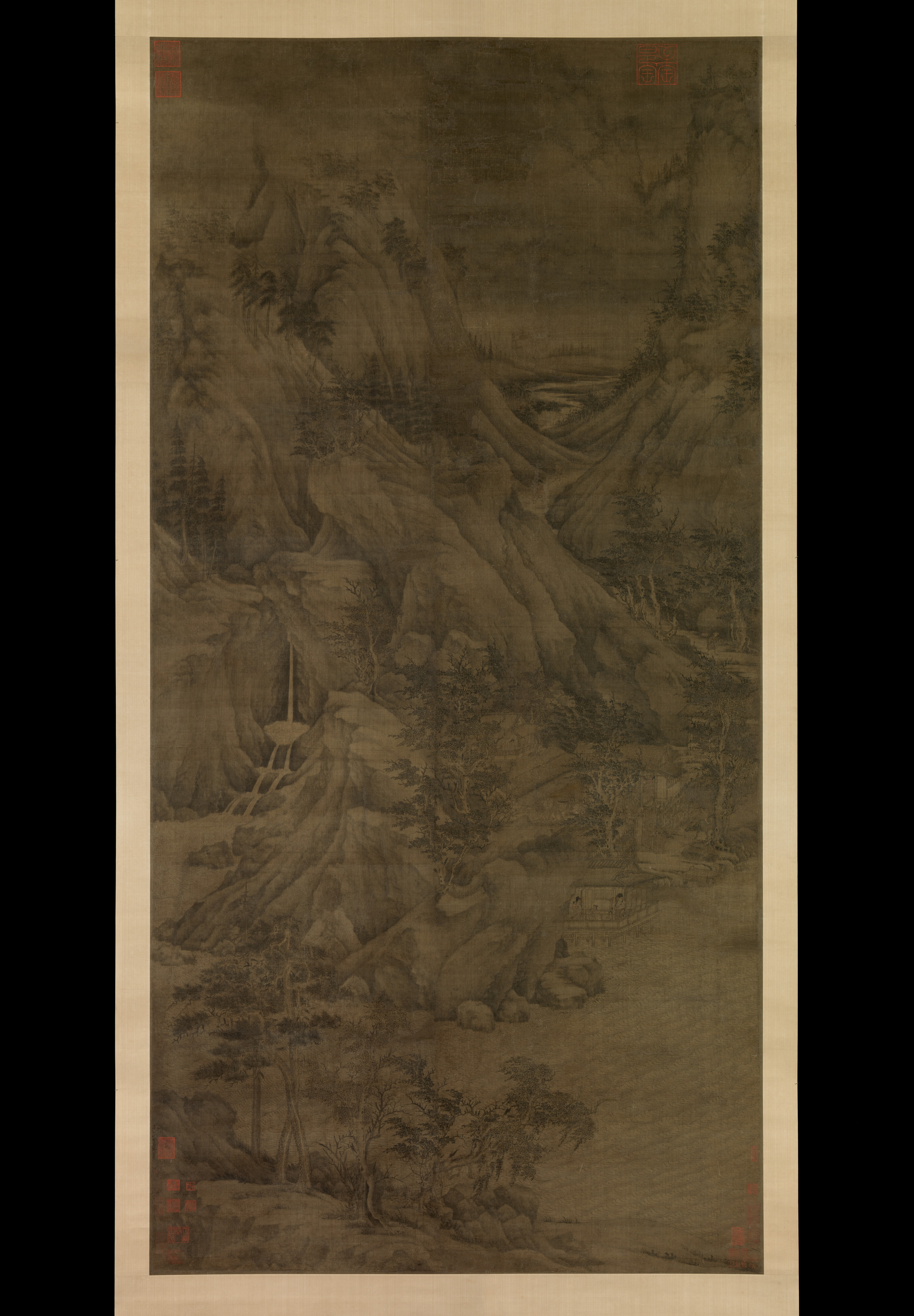
Riverbank by Dong Yuan (932–962)

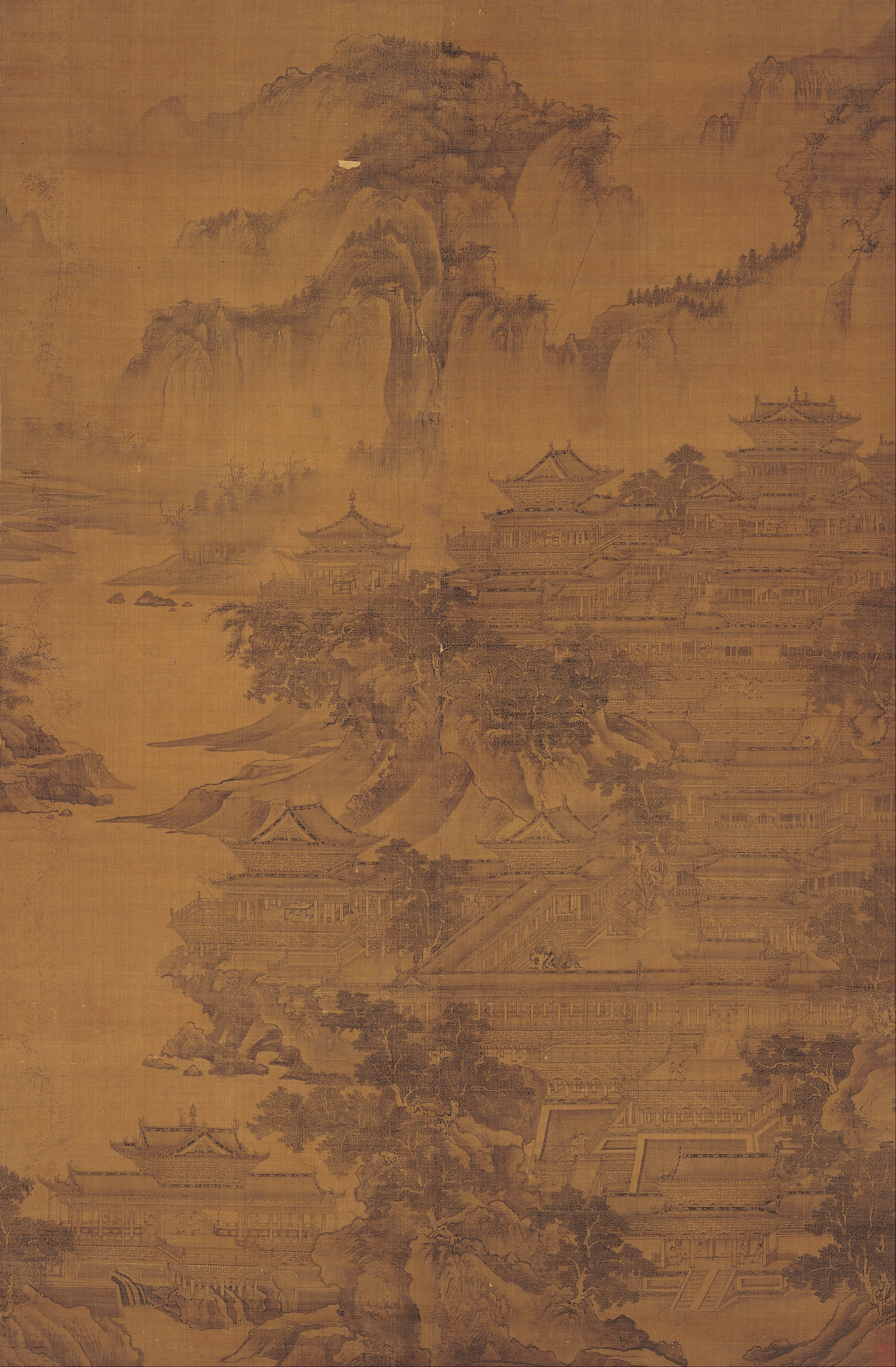
Summer Palace of Emperor Ming (明皇避暑宮) by Guo Zhongshu (929–977)

Unlike the dynasties of northern China, which succeeded one another in rapid succession, the regimes of South China were generally concurrent, each controlling a specific geographical area. These were known as "The Ten Kingdoms" (in fact, some claimed the title of Emperor, such as Former Shu and Later Shu). Each court was a center of artistic excellence. The period is noted for the vitality of its poetry and for its economic prosperity. Commerce grew so quickly that there was a shortage of metallic currency. This was partly addressed by the creation of bank drafts, or "flying money" (feiqian), as well as by certificates of deposit. Wood block printing became common during this period, 500 years before Johannes Gutenberg's press.

The Ten Kingdoms were:

- Yang Wu (907–937)
- Wuyue (907–978)
- Min (909–945)
- Ma Chu (907–951)
- Southern Han (917–971)
- Former Shu (907–925)
- Later Shu (934–965)
- Jingnan (924–963)
- Southern Tang (937–976)
- Northern Han (951–979)

Only ten are traditionally listed, hence the era's name. Some historians, such as Bo Yang, count eleven, including Yan and Qi but not the Northern Han, viewing it as simply a continuation of Later Han. This era also coincided with the founding of the Liao dynasty in the north, and the Dali Kingdom in the southwest.

Other regimes during this period include Zhao, Yiwu Circuit, Dingnan Circuit, Wuping Circuit, Qingyuan Circuit, Yin, Ganzhou Uyghur Kingdom, Guiyi Circuit and Xiliangfu.

=== Yang Wu ===
The Yang Wu (902–937) was established in modern-day Jiangsu, Anhui, and Jiangxi. It was founded by Yang Xingmi, who became a Tang dynasty military governor in 892. The capital was initially at Guangling (present-day Yangzhou) and later moved to Jinling (present-day Nanjing). The kingdom fell in 937 when it was taken from within by the founder of the Southern Tang.

=== Wuyue ===
The Wuyue was the longest-lived (907–978) and among the most powerful of the southern states. Wuyue was known for its learning and culture. It was founded by Qian Liu, who set up his capital at Xifu (modern-day Hangzhou). It was based mostly in modern Zhejiang province but also held parts of southern Jiangsu. Qian Liu was named the Prince of Yue by the Tang emperor in 902; the Prince of Wu was added in 904. After the fall of the Tang dynasty in 907, he declared himself king of Wuyue. Wuyue survived until the eighteenth year of the Song dynasty, when Qian Shu surrendered to the expanding dynasty.

=== Min ===
The Min (909–945) was founded by Wang Shenzhi, who named himself the Prince of Min with its capital at Changle (present-day Fuzhou). One of Shenzhi's sons proclaimed the independent state of Yin in the northeast of Min territory. The Southern Tang took that territory after the Min asked for help. Despite declaring loyalty to the neighboring Wuyue, the Southern Tang finished its conquest of Min in 945.

=== Southern Han ===
The Southern Han (917–971) was founded in Guangzhou by Liu Yan. His brother, Liu Yin, was named regional governor by the Tang court. The kingdom included Guangdong, Guangxi, and Hainan. It was finally conquered by the Song dynasty.

=== Ma Chu ===
The Ma Chu (927–951) was founded by Ma Yin with the capital at Changsha. The kingdom held Hunan and northeastern Guangxi. Ma was named regional military governor by the Tang court in 896, and named himself the Prince of Chu with the fall of the Tang in 907. This status as the Prince of Chu was confirmed by the Southern Tang in 927. The Southern Tang absorbed the state in 951 and moved the royal family to its capital in Nanjing, although Southern Tang rule of the region was temporary, as the next year former Chu military officers under the leadership of Liu Yan seized the territory. In the waning years of the Five Dynasties and Ten Kingdoms period, the region was ruled by Zhou Xingfeng. In 963, the region was annexed by Song dynasty.

=== Northern Han ===
Although considered one of the ten kingdoms, the Northern Han was based in the traditional Shatuo stronghold of Shanxi. It was founded by Liu Min (劉旻), formerly known as Liu Chong (劉崇), after the Later Han fell to the Han Chinese-led Later Zhou, in 951. With the protection of the powerful Liao dynasty, the Northern Han maintained nominal independence until the Song dynasty wrested it from the Khitans in 979.

=== Jingnan (also known as Nanping) ===
The smallest of the southern states, Jingnan (924–963), was founded by Gao Jichang, a former general of Liang. It was based in Jiangling and held two other districts southwest of present-day Wuhan in Hubei. Gao was in the service of the Later Liang (the successor of the Tang in North China). Gao's successors claimed the title of King of Nanping after the fall of the Later Liang in 924. It was a small and weak kingdom, and thus tried to maintain good relations with each of the Five Dynasties. The kingdom fell to advancing armies of the Song in 963.

=== Former Shu ===
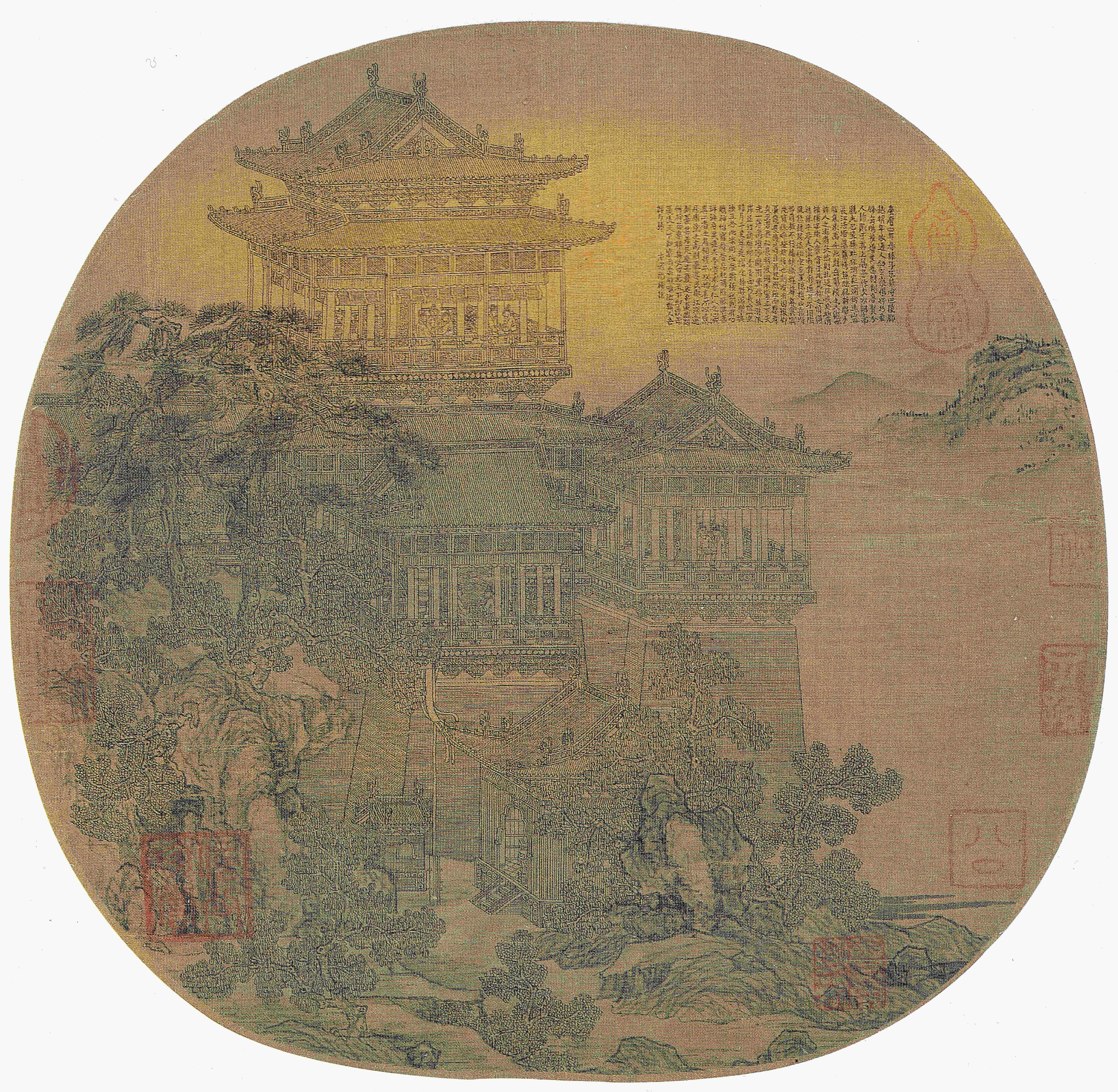
The Yueyang Tower by Li Sheng (fl. 908–925)

Former Shu (907–925) was founded after the fall of the Tang dynasty by Wang Jian, who held his court in Chengdu. The kingdom held most of present-day Sichuan, western Hubei, and parts of southern Gansu and Shaanxi. Wang was named military governor of western Sichuan by the Tang court in 891. The kingdom fell when his son surrendered in the face of an advance by the Later Tang in 925.

=== Later Shu ===
The Later Shu (935–965) is essentially a resurrection of the previous Shu state that had fallen a decade earlier to the Later Tang. Because the Later Tang was in decline and Li Cunxu was killed in a revolt, Meng Zhixiang found the opportunity to reassert Shu's independence. Like the Former Shu, the capital was at Chengdu and it basically controlled the same territory as its predecessor. The kingdom was ruled well until forced to succumb to Song armies in 965.

=== Southern Tang ===
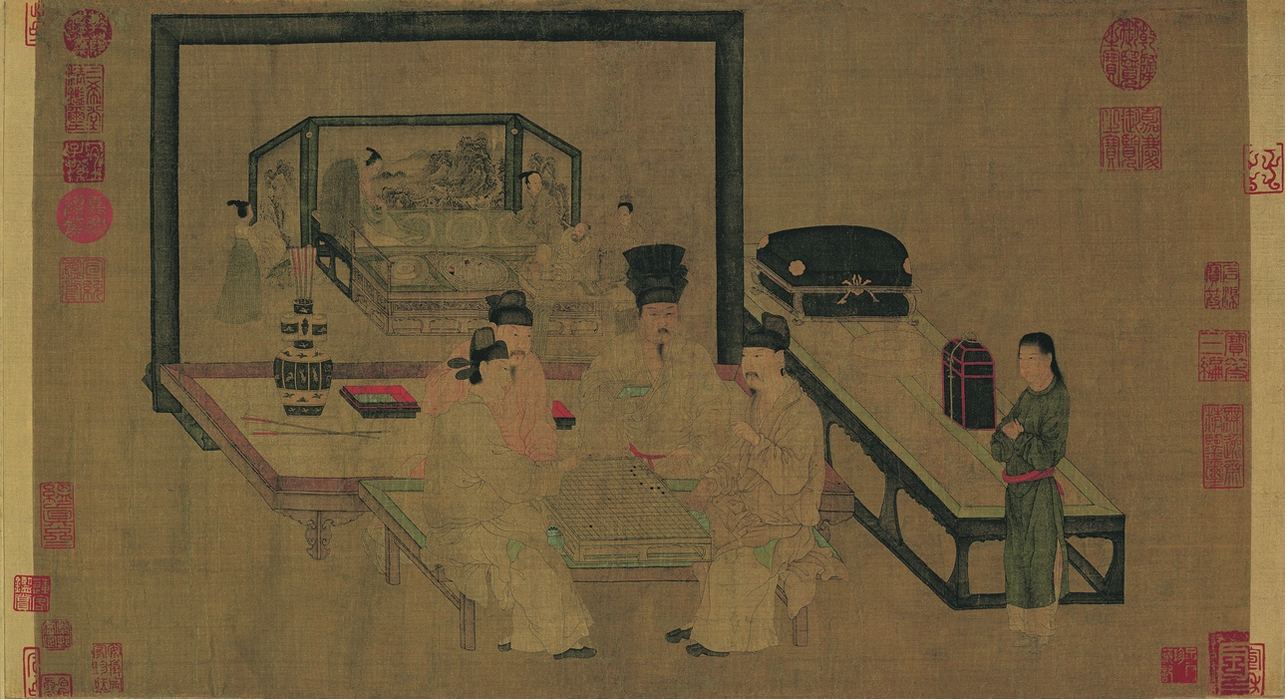
A painting depicting weiqi players by Zhou Wenju (fl. 942–961)

The Southern Tang (937–975) was the successor state of Wu as Li Bian (Emperor Liezu) took the state over from within in 937. Expanding from the original domains of Wu, it eventually took over Yin, Min, and Chu, holding present-day southern Anhui, southern Jiangsu, much of Jiangxi, Hunan, and eastern Hubei at its height. The kingdom became nominally subordinate to the expanding Song in 961 and was invaded outright in 975, when it was formally absorbed into the Song dynasty.

=== Transitions between the Ten Kingdoms ===
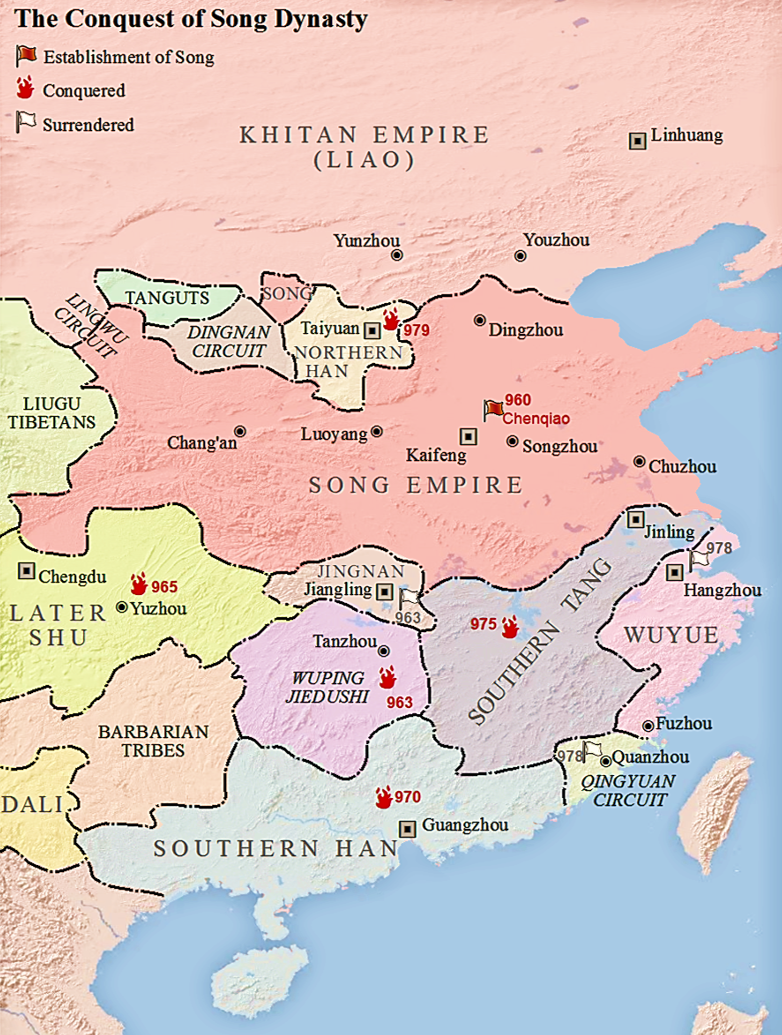
Song dynasty's conquest of China (960–979)

Although more stable than northern China as a whole, southern China was also torn apart by warfare. Wu quarreled with its neighbours, a trend that continued as Wu was replaced with Southern Tang. In the 940s Min and Chu underwent internal crises which Southern Tang handily took advantage of, destroying Min in 945 and Chu in 951. Remnants of Min and Chu, however, survived in the form of Qingyuan Jiedushi and Wuping Jiedushi for many years after. With this, Southern Tang became the undisputedly most powerful regime in southern China. However, it was unable to defeat incursions by the Later Zhou between 956 and 958, and ceded all of its land north of the Yangtze River.

The Song dynasty, established in 960, was determined to reunify China. Jingnan and Wuping Jiedushi were swept away in 963, Later Shu in 965, Southern Han in 971, and Southern Tang in 975. Finally, Wuyue and Qingyuan Jiedushi gave up their land to Northern Song in 978, bringing all of southern China under the control of the central government.

In common with other periods of fragmentation, the Five Dynasties and Ten Kingdoms period resulted in a division between northern and southern China. The greater stability of the Ten Kingdoms, especially the longevity of Wuyue and Southern Han, would contribute to the development of distinct regional identities within China. The distinction was reinforced by the Old History and the New History. Written from the northern viewpoint, these chronicles organized the history around the Five Dynasties (the north), presenting the Ten Kingdoms (the south) as illegitimate, self-absorbed and indulgent.

== Culture ==
The Five Dynasties and Ten Kingdoms period turned away from the international cultural mood of the Tang dynasty and appears as a transition towards the solidified national culture of the Song dynasty. Throughout the period, there was marked cultural and economic growth, rather than decline.

Several Northern dynasties originated in the northeast, and centralisation of the north led to a migration of provincial elites into the capital, particularly northeasterners, creating a new metropolitan culture. After the unification of China by the Song dynasty, the culture, arts and literature of the Southern states were incorporated into the new regime. The Song dynasty adopted a distinctively Southern Chinese cultural outlook. The preserved cultural traditions of Southern Tang, Wu Yue and Later Shu were used to rebuild the cultural landscape of the north. Southern libraries were transported north, Southeastern architecture was promoted in the new capital, and Southeastern Buddhist icons, clergy and relics were concentrated in the new capital so as to reintegrate these traditions into the imperial culture. This was distinct from the five Northern dynasties, who never supported extended monastic lineage networks but instead typically sought to restrict them and draw on their economic and military resources.

Although short, the period had cultural innovations in different areas. In pottery, "white ceramics" were developed. In painting, the "varied landscape" of China was inspired by Taoism. It emphasized the sacredness of mountains as places between heaven and earth and depicted the natural world as a source of harmony.

Art from the Five Dynasties and Ten Kingdoms period
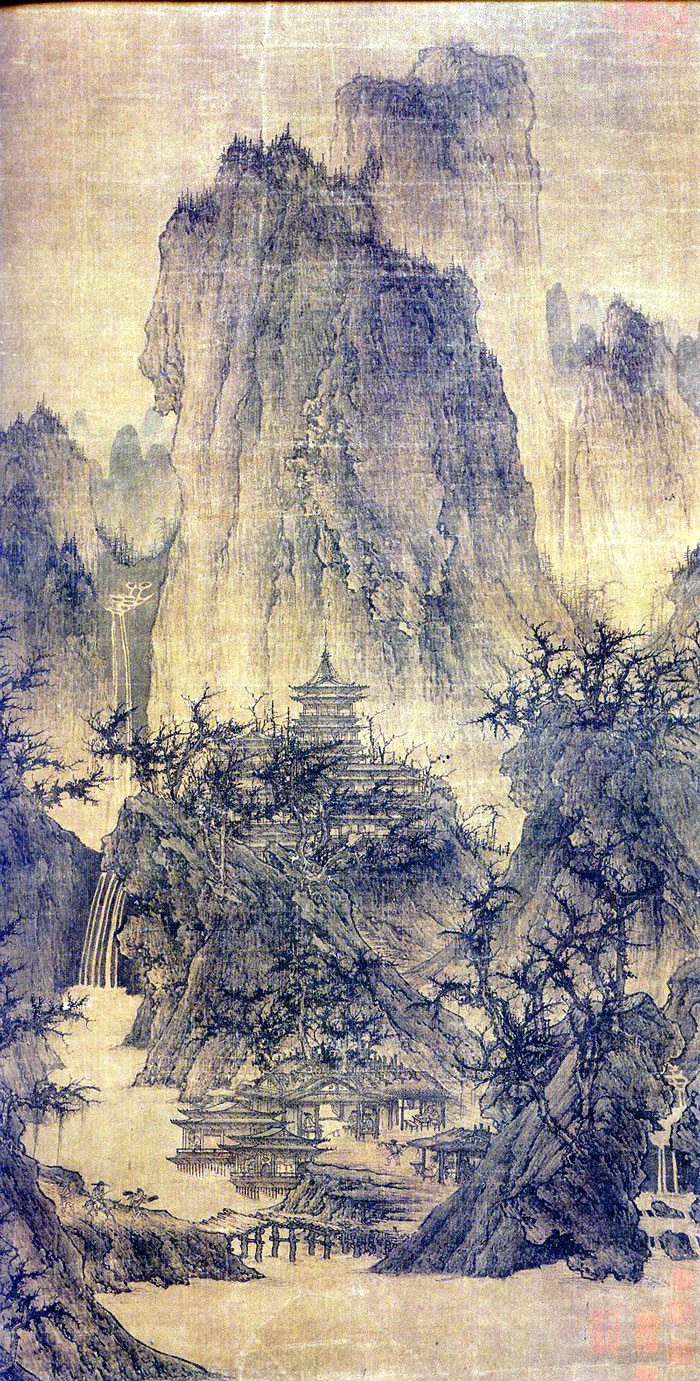
Painting by Chinese artist Li Cheng (c. 919–967)

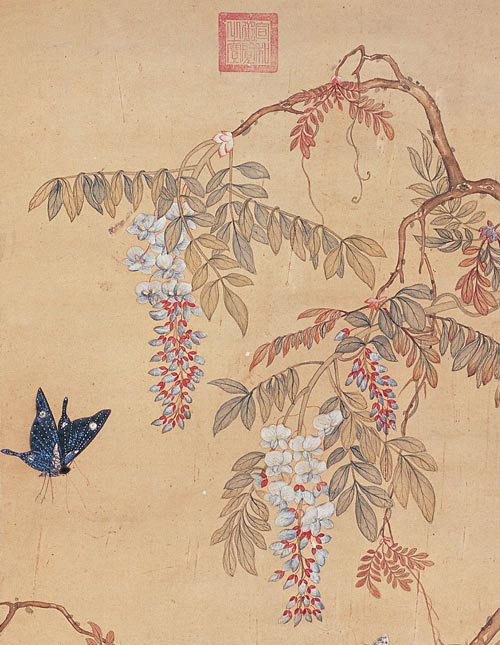
Butterfly and Wisteria Flowers, by Xu Xi (886–974)

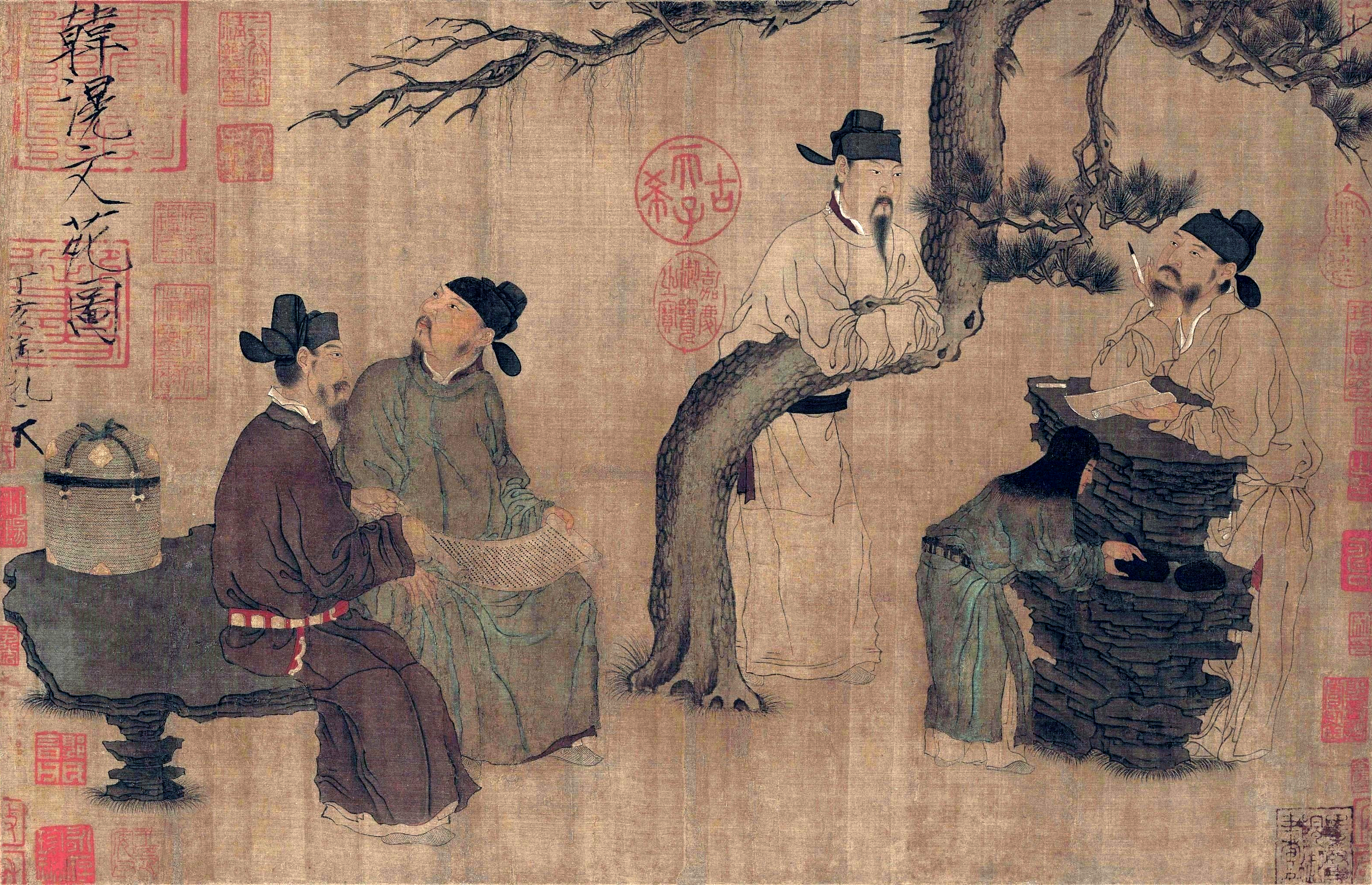
A Literary Garden, by Zhou Wenju
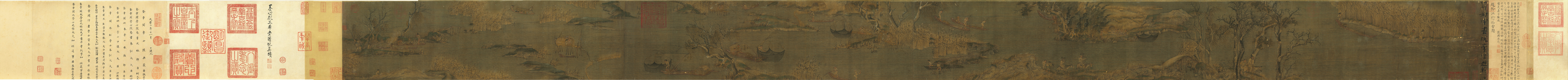
Early Snow on the River (五代南唐 趙幹 江行初雪圖); shan shui painting by Zhao Gan.

== Law ==
In later tradition, the Five Dynasties is viewed as a period of judicial abuse and excessive punishment. This view reflects both actual problems with the administration of justice and the bias of Confucian historians, who disapproved of the decentralization and militarization that characterized this period. While Tang procedure called for delaying executions until appeals were exhausted, this was not generally the case in the Five Dynasties.

Other abuses included the use of severe torture. The Later Han was the most notorious dynasty in this regard. Suspects could be tortured to death with long knives and nails. The military officer in charge of security of the capital is said to have executed suspects without inquiry.

The Tang code of 737 was the basic statutory law for this period, together supplemental edicts and collections. The Later Liang promulgated a code in 909. This code was blamed for delays in the administration of justice and said to be excessively harsh with respect to economic crimes. The Later Tang, Later Jin, and Later Zhou also produced recompilations. The Later Han was in power too briefly to make a mark on the legal system.

== See also ==
- Annam (Chinese province)
- Chinese sovereign
- Conquest of Southern Tang by Song
- Dali Kingdom
- Family trees of the emperors of the Five Dynasties
- Liao dynasty
- Old History of the Five Dynasties
- Tibetan Empire
- Timeline of the Five Dynasties and Ten Kingdoms
- Zizhi Tongjian

== Bibliography ==
- Davis, Richard L. (2014). From Warhorses to Ploughshares: The Later Tang Reign of Emperor Mingzong. Hong Kong: Hong Kong University Press. ISBN 978-988-8208-10-4. OCLC 904810968.
- Dudbridge, Glen (2013). A Portrait of Five Dynasties China: From the Memoirs of Wang Renyu (880-956). Oxford Oriental Monographs. Oxford: Oxford University Press. ISBN 978-0-19-967068-0.
- Gungwu, Wang (1963). The Structure of Power in North China During the Five Dynasties (PDF). Stanford University Press. doi:10.2307/2753999. JSTOR 2753999. S2CID 165283486.
- Hartwell, Robert M. (December 1982). "Demographic, Political, and Social Transformations of China, 750–1550". Harvard Journal of Asiatic Studies. 42 (2): 365–442. doi:10.2307/2718941. JSTOR 2718941.
- Hung, Hing Ming (2014). Ten States, Five Dynasties, One Great Emperor: How Emperor Taizu Unified China in the Song Dynasty. New York: Algora Publishing. ISBN 978-1-62894-072-5.
- Kurz, Johannes L. (2011). China's Southern Tang Dynasty, 937–976. Asian States and Empires. London: Routledge. ISBN 978-1-136-80956-9.
- Lorge, Peter Allan, ed. (2011). Five Dynasties and Ten Kingdoms. Hong Kong: Chinese University Press. ISBN 978-962-996-418-4. OCLC 748743890.
- Schafer, Edward H. (1954). Empire of Min: A South China Kingdom of the Tenth Century. Rutland, V: Tuttle Publishingt. OCLC 411661.
- Wang, Hongjie (2011). Power and Politics in Tenth-century China: The Former Shu Regime. Amherst, NY: Cambria Press. ISBN 978-1-60497-764-6.
- Xiu, Ouyang (2004) [1077]. Historical Records of the Five Dynasties. Translated by Davis, Richard L. New York: Columbia University Press. ISBN 978-0-231-50228-3.

Preceded by Tang dynasty	Dynasties in Chinese history 907–960	Succeeded by Song dynasty Liao dynasty
