= New People's Party (disambiguation) =

New People's Party is a Hong Kong political party established in 2011.

New People's Party may also refer to:

- New People's Party (South Korea), a short-lived South Korean political party from 3 September to 15 October 2017

== See also ==
- People's New Party, a former Japanese political party from 2005 to 2013
- Sinmindang (disambiguation)
  - New People's Party of Korea, a short-lived North Korean political party from 16 February to 23 November 1946
  - New Democratic Party (South Korea), a former South Korean political party from 1967 to 1980
