= Zhou Wenju =

Chinese painter

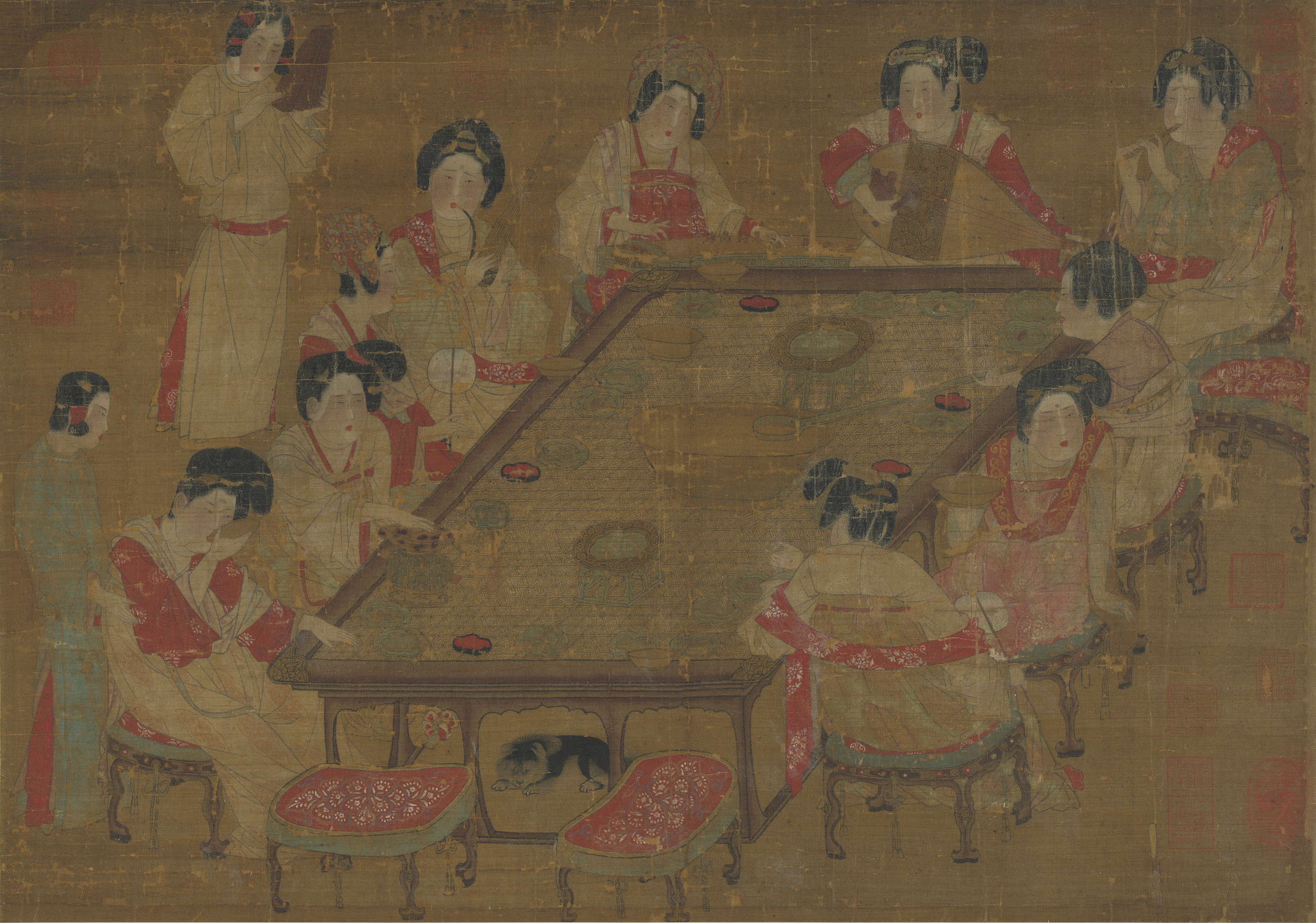

Zhou Wenju (Chinese: 周文矩) (fl. 942–961), also known as Chou Wen-chu, was a Chinese painter during the Five Dynasties and Ten Kingdoms period (907–960). His exact birth and death dates are not known.

Zhou was born in Jurong, and specialized in figure painting. He worked as a painter in attendance at the Painting Academy of the Southern Tang court. It is recorded that Zhou participated in executing a joint work at the banquet held by Emperor Yuanzong of Southern Tang on New Year's Day, 947. A follower of Zhou Fang in the Tang. Quite a few paintings are attributed to him, but none with much evidence. Most works attributed to him are later copies or misattributions. Four scroll monochrome copies before 1140 are a little plausible, one of which is in the Metropolitan Museum of Art.

== Gallery ==
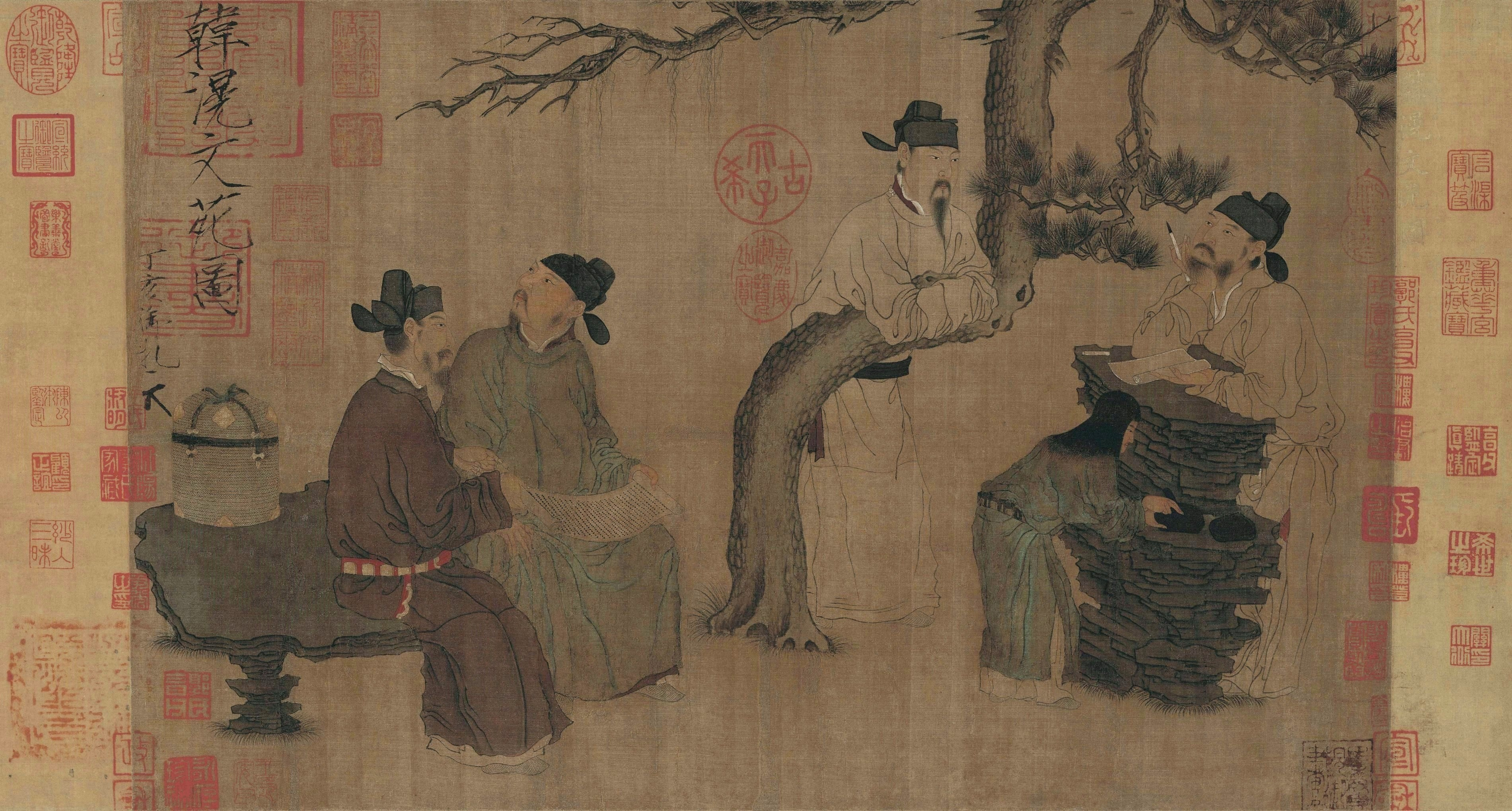
A Literary Garden (文苑图 Wenyuantu)

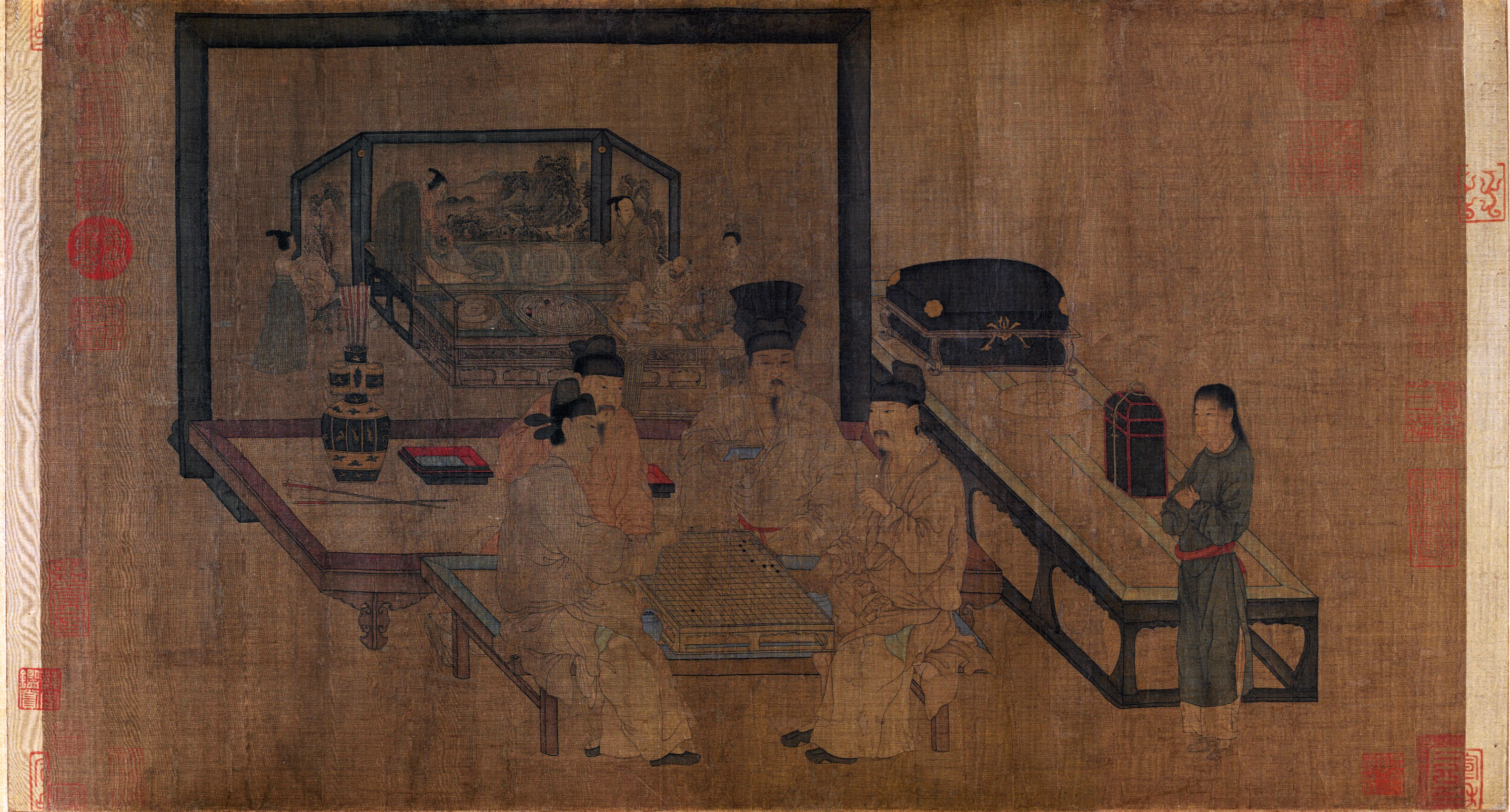
Chess Meeting with Double Screens (重屏会棋图 Zhongping Huiqitu), depicting Li Jing and his brothers playing weiqi

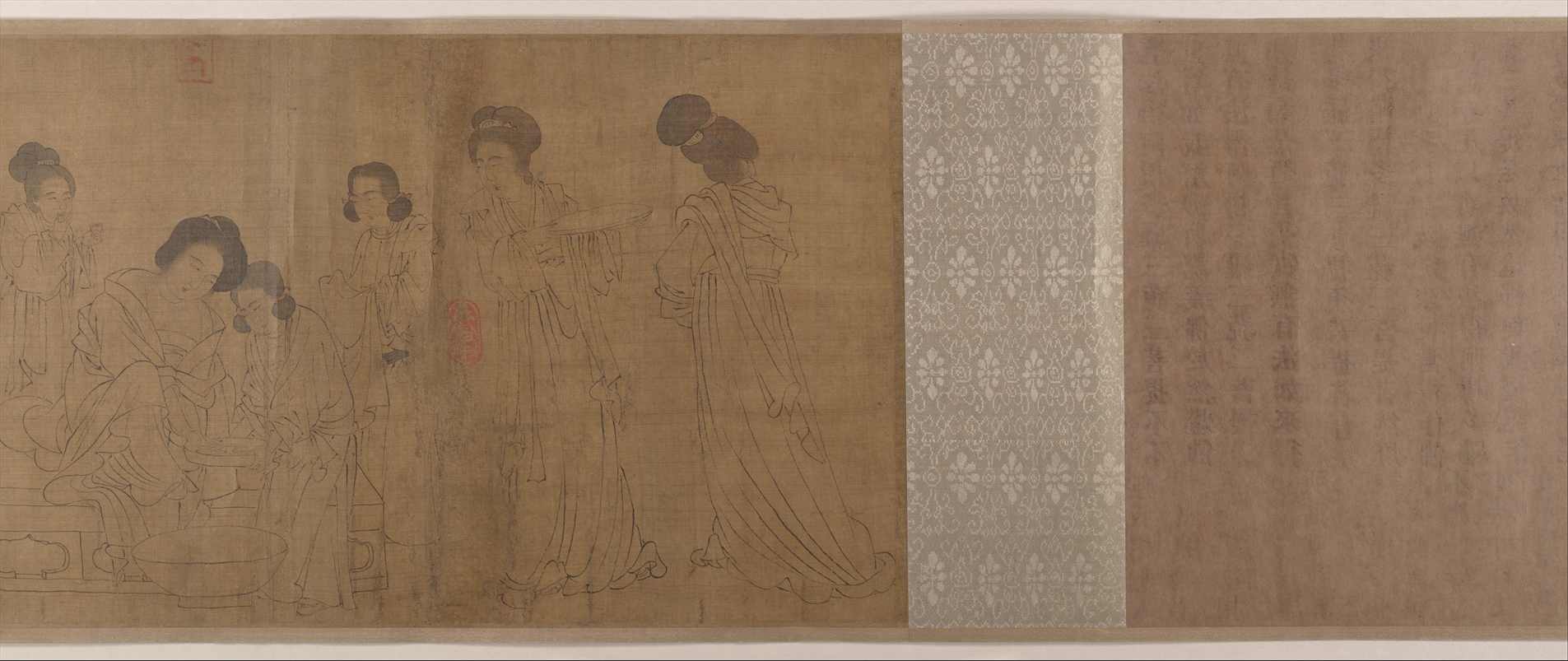
In the Palace (宫中图 Gongzhongtu), 12th century copy, section one.

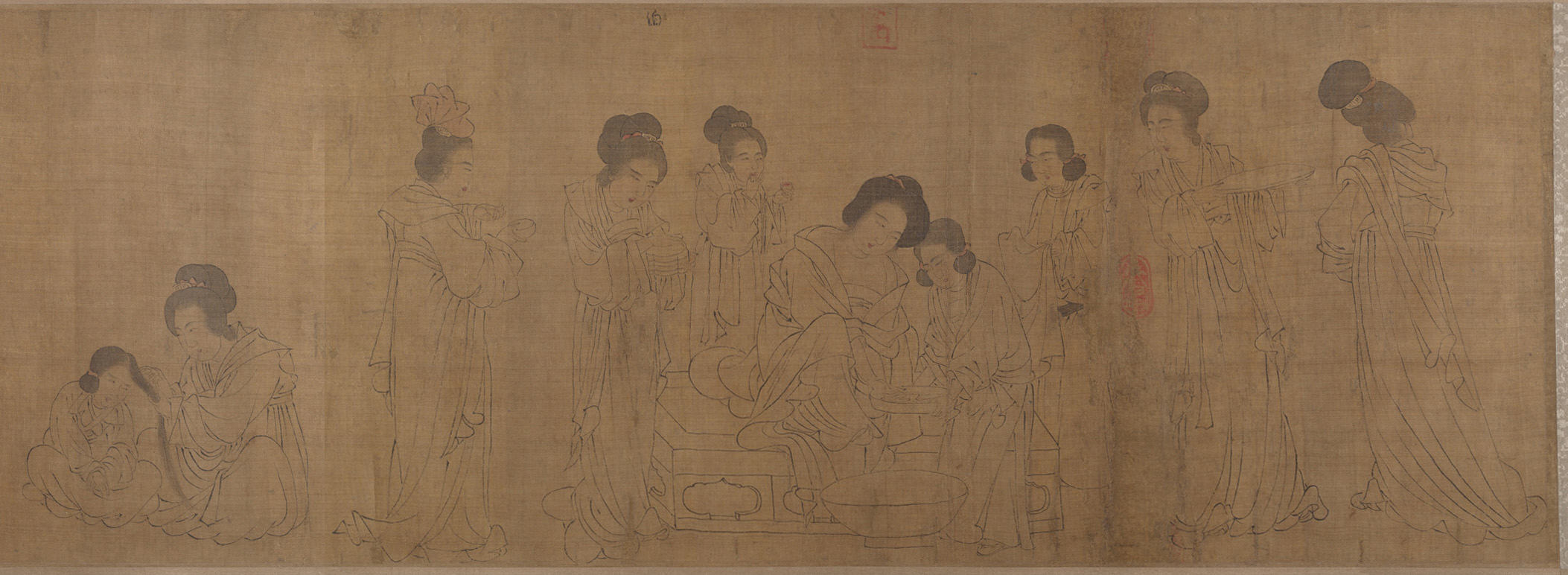
In the Palace, section two.

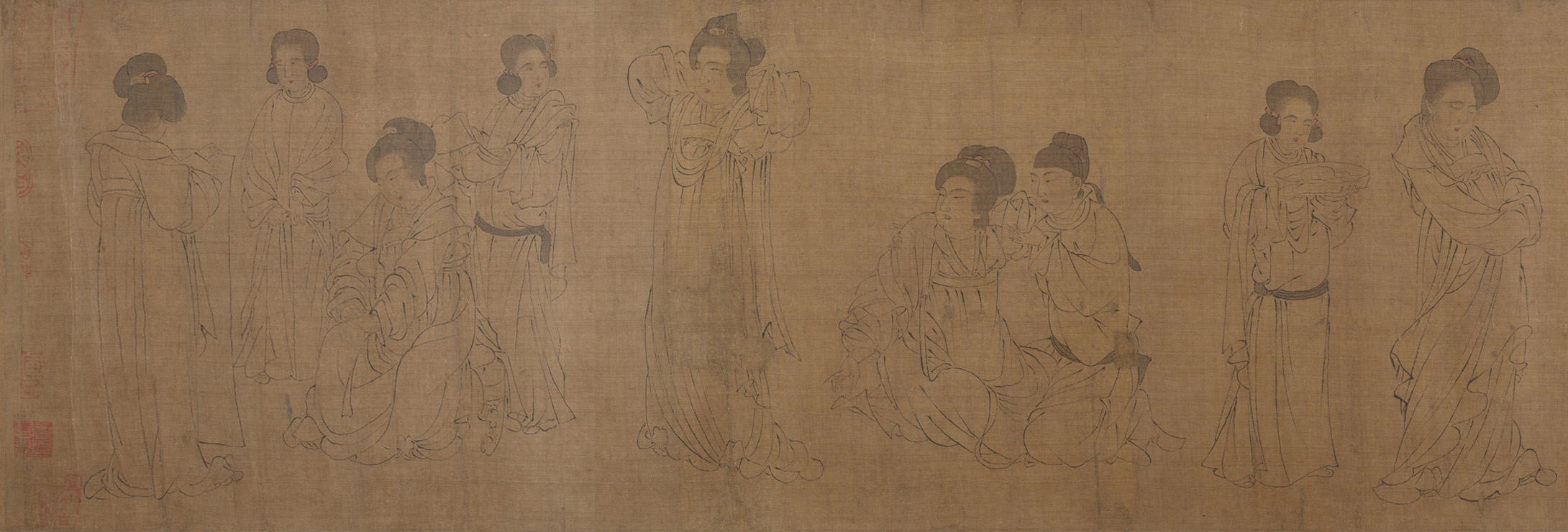
In the Palace, section three.

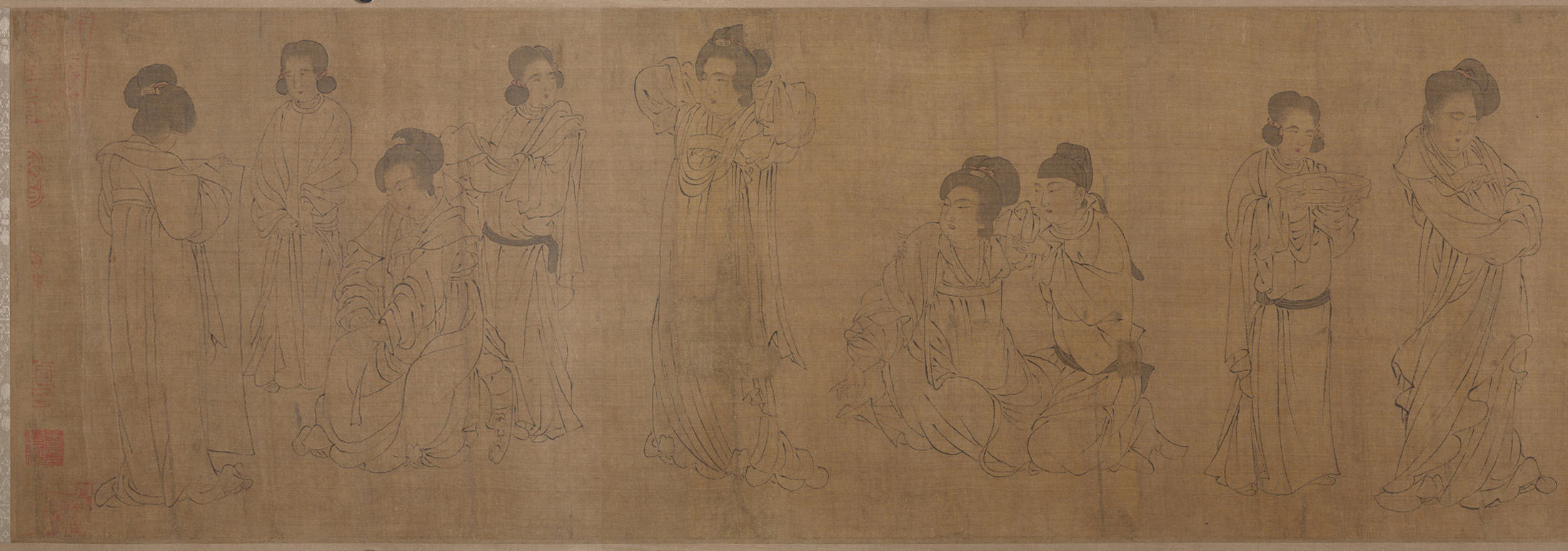
In the Palace, section four.

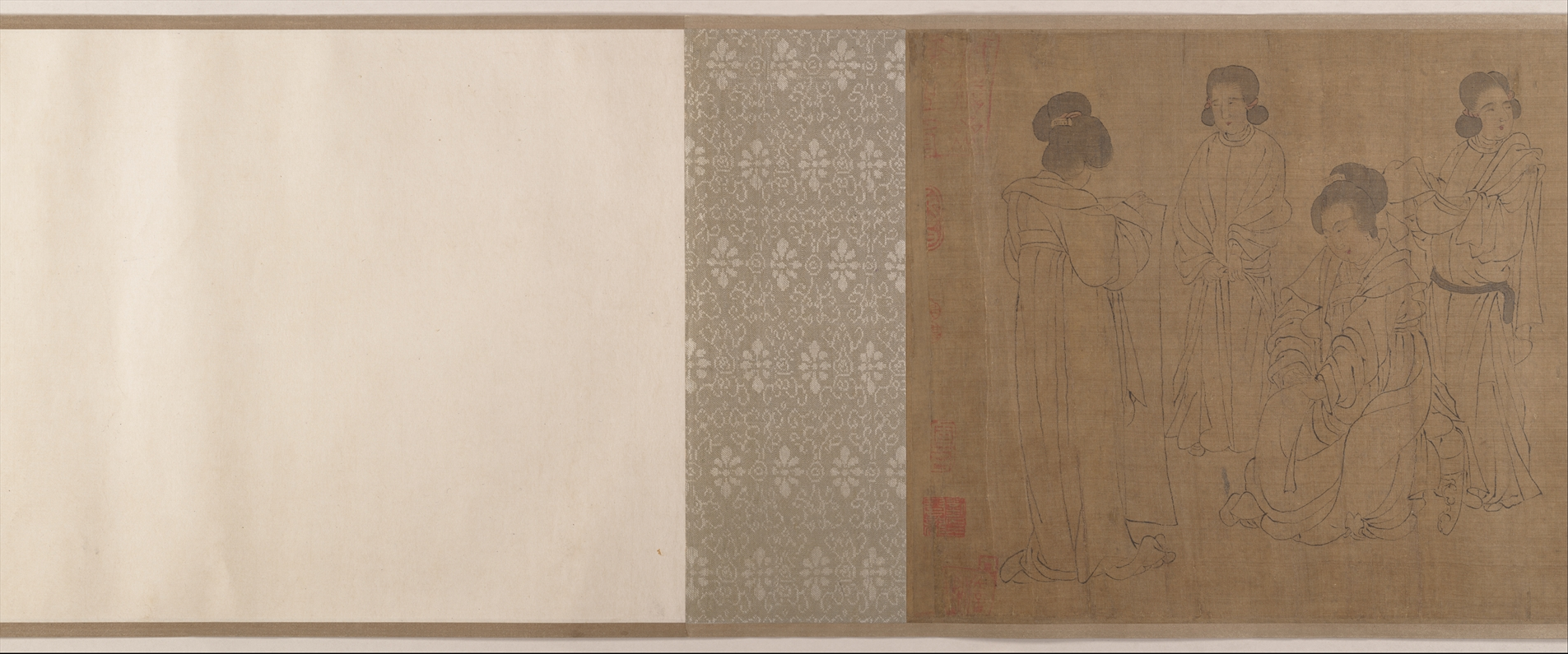
In the Palace, section five.
