= Deng Xiaonan =

Chinese historian (born 1950)

- 邓小南
- Born: June 1950 (age 76); Beijing, China
- Education: Peking University
- Father: Deng Guangming
- Scientific career
- Fields: History
- Workplaces: Centre for Research on Ancient Chinese History, Peking University

Deng Xiaonan (born June 1950) is a Chinese historian and the Boya Chair Professor at Peking University's Centre for Research on Ancient Chinese History. She is known for her research on Song history, Ancient Chinese bureaucratic systems and female history of the Tang and Song. She is currently serving as the director of the Institute of Humanities and Social Sciences of PKU.

== Early life ==
Deng was born in 1950 in Beijing. Her father is the noted Chinese academic Deng Guangming.

== Career ==
=== Education ===
Deng completed her undergraduate degree in Chinese history at Peking University in 1982. She graduated from her master's in 1985 from the same institution.

=== Academia ===
Deng became a lecturer in 1987. She became an assistant professor in 1991. She was made a professor in 1997.

Deng ran a 16-episode open-access class online with Yan Buke. Deng led the classes on Ancient Chinese governance and the Silk Road. As of 2016, the open class has had over 2,500 participants.

She attended Harvard University as a Coordinate Research Scholar specialising in Chinese History at the Harvard-Yenching Institute in 2014.

Deng has given lectures on women's development history and gender at Osaka City University, Academia Sinica in Taiwan and a United Nations workshop.

== Selected works ==
- Xiaonan Deng and Christian Lamouroux. "The "Ancestors' Family Instructions": Authority and Sovereignty in Song China." Journal of Song-Yuan Studies, no. 35 (2005): 79-97. https://www.jstor.org/stable/23496184.
- Xiaonan Deng and Christian Lamouroux. «Les "règles familiales des ancêtres". Autorité impériale et gouvernement dans la Chine médiévale». Annales. Histoire, Sciences Sociales, 3/2004 (59e année), p. 491-518.
- Xiaonan Deng. "Women in Turfan during the Sixth to Eighth Centuries: A Look at Their Activities Outside the Home." The Journal of Asian Studies 58, no. 1 (1999): 85–103. doi:10.2307/2658390
