= Duhak =

Human settlement in India

Coordinates: 31°41′N 76°59′E

Duhak is a village in Bilaspur District in Himachal Pradesh, India.

The village is about 15 km from the town of Ghumarwin and about 2 km from Berthin, which is the nearest place to purchase something.

Duhak has one middle school.
