= Deng Guangming =

Chinese historian

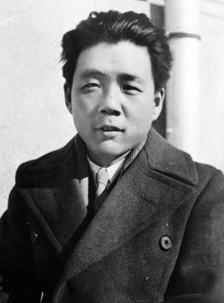
- Born: March 16, 1907; Linyin County, Shandong Province, China
- Died: January 10, 1998 (aged 90); Beijing
- Occupations: Professor of History (later Dean), Peking University
- Children: Deng Xiaonan
- Writing career
- Language: Chinese

Dèng Guǎngmíng (simplified Chinese: 邓广铭; traditional Chinese: 鄧廣銘, 16 March 1907 – 10 January 1998) was a Chinese historian who specialized in the 10th to 13th century Song, Jin and Liao dynasties.

Born in Linyi County, Shandong and known by the courtesy name Gongsan (恭三), Deng's principal works include:

- Outline of Chinese History • The Song, Liao and Jin Dynasties (中国史纲要•宋辽金史纲要)
- Wang Anshi's Political Reforms During the Northern Song Dynasty (北宋政治改革家王安石)
- Biography of Yue Fei (岳飞传)
- Biography of Xin Qiji (辛弃疾传)
- Biography of Chen Longchuan (陈龙川传)
- Chronicle of Xin Qiji's Life (辛稼轩年谱)
- Annotated Works of Xin Qiji (稼轩词编年笺注)
- Amended Institutional Function Records from the History of Song (宋史职官志考正)
- Amended Criminal Law Records from the History of Song (宋史刑法志考正)

== Life ==
=== Early life ===
Born to a relatively well-off family in Qijia Village (齐家庄), Linyi County, Deng entered a private school in 1913 at the age of six. In the autumn of 1920 he passed the entrance examination for the Lingao County Number One Advanced Primary School then three years later entered Shandong Number 1 Normal School where he "received enlightenment through real education". As this was the warlord era in China, a reactionary appointed new headmaster causing a school-wide protest strike. Deng joined in and was expelled in 1927. He sat the entrance exam for Peking, now Beijing University in 1931 but was not enrolled. Instead Deng entered the English Department at the Catholic University of Peking (now Fu Jen Catholic University). The following year he retook the entrance examination for Peking University and was admitted as a student.

=== University career ===
During his time at Peking University Deng met the two greatest influences on his academic career, Fu Sinian and Hu Shih, who were both his tutors. In his fourth year, Deng took an extra course taught by Hu on biographical studies. For his graduation thesis he wrote his Biography of Chen Longchuan (陈龙川传), a work that was highly rated by Hu and whose praise created a huge influence on Deng. After his graduation from the History Department in 1936 he remained at the university as Hu's assistant in the Humanities Research Institute whilst also acting as an assistant historiography teacher. Thereafter, Deng's main task together with Luo Ergang was to catalog the stone rubbings of successive dynasties stored in the university library. At the same time he assisted Qian Mu compile the Synopsis of Dynastic History (国史大纲). One year after graduation Deng had already decided that henceforth his life would be follow the path of academia

=== Early career and works ===
Amongst Hu Shih's comments on Deng's Biography of Chen Longchuan he wrote: "Literary sources on the friendship between Chen Longchuan and Xin Qiji are lacking and should be improved upon." This gave Deng his first opportunity to research Xin Qinji and as this was at the time of the invasion of China by Japan he decided as an act of patriotism to write a historical biography. Thereafter in 1937 Deng published his Chronicle of Xin Qiji's Life (辛稼轩年谱) together with the Annotated Works of Xin Qiji (稼轩词疏证) which were unanimously praised by Hu Shih, Chen Yinke and Xia Chengtao (夏承焘/夏承燾) amongst others and made the author's name.

Following the Marco Polo Bridge Incident on 7 July 1937 the War of Resistance against the Japanese began. Deng continued his research at the Beiping Library and with the assistance of Fu Sinian and Zhao Wanli (赵万里) completed a work containing Chronicle of Xin Qiji's Life (辛稼轩年谱), Annotated Works of Xin Qiji (稼轩词编年笺注) and Treasury of Xin Qiji's Writing and Poetry (辛稼轩诗文钞存). In August 1939 Deng travelled through Shanghai, Hong Kong and Hanoi to the newly established National Southwestern Associated University in Kunming, Yunnan Province. Here he became teaching assistant to Beijing University researcher Chen Yinke. In 1940, Deng followed Fu Sinian to Li Village, Nanxi County, Sichuan where from 1940 until Spring 1942 he received support from the board of directors of the Sino-British Boxer Rebellion Indemnity Fund (中英庚款董事会) and began his research into the History of Song. At this time he also completed and published Amended Government Functionaries Records from the History of Song (宋史职官志考正) and Amended Criminal Law Records from the History of Song (宋史刑法志考正).

In July 1943 on the recommendation of Fu Sinian, Deng became Assistant Professor of History at Fudan University, relocating to its temporary location in Beibei, Chongqing. Here his lectures on narrative Chinese history were welcomed by the students and two years later he became a full professor. During this period he wrote and published Biography of Chen Longchuan (陈龙川传), Chronicle of Han Shizhong's Life (韩世忠年谱) and Biography of Yue Fei (岳飞传) in succession.

=== People's Republic of China Era ===
At the end of the war in 1945, Deng returned to Beijing University and was appointed Secretary of the University acting on behalf of Fu Sinian. Not long afterwards he became a professor in the History Department. In 1949, Chiang Kai-shek requested that Fu Sinian and Hu Shih accompany him to Taiwan. Deng in turn was invited by his former tutors but he declined and instead remained in mainland China. Deng's appointment as Professor of History at Beijing University followed in 1950.

The 1950s were the golden era of Deng's academic career when between 1947 and 1957 he produced the largest quantity of his historiographical work. In 1958 he was criticized for his suggestion that the "four keystones" of Chinese historical education were chronology, institutional functions, historical geography and bibliography. Later Deng began to contribute to the compilation of the Outline of Chinese History • The Song, Liao and Jin Dynasties (中国史纲要•宋辽金史纲要).

Following the start of the Cultural Revolution in 1966, Deng was denounced as a "reactionary academic" and sentenced to forced labor at either Beijing University Re-education Camp or sent to a re-education village in the countryside where he "reformed through living in a cowshed". In October 1969 according to a decision by the army propaganda team he was sent to Poyang Lake in Jiangxi Province along with the rest of the teaching and administrative staff of Beijing University for "re-education through labor" which involved manual work in the fields.

When the Cultural Revolution ended with Mao Zedong's death in 1976 Deng became Dean of the History Faculty of Beijing University. From 1980 onwards he held successive posts as a member of the presidium of the China Historiography Association and President of the Chinese Song History Research Association. After 1982 he acted as a consultant to the China National Antiquarian Book Publishing Project and subsequently joined national working committees researching antiquarian books. In 1983 Deng established the National Ancient History Research Center at Beijing University of which he became Director and where he taught a large number of talented students. At the same time Deng's academic achievements continued to grow.

== Academic Honors ==
"In the 20th century, Deng initiated study and research into the History of Song and was the founder of the system of Song Dynasty historiography". From his 1937 publication of Chronicle of Xin Qiji's Life and Annotated Works of Xin Qiji onwards Deng conducted extensive and thorough research into the history of the political system of the Song Dynasty, its economic history as well as its degrees and legal regulations, academic and cultural history along with other topics. Historian Zhou Yilang (周一良) rated Deng as the "Number one Song Dynasty scholar of the 20th Century both in China and internationally."

== Partial list of works ==
- Deng, Guangming (2006). Jian Bozan (翦伯赞) (ed.). 中国史纲要 [Essential Chinese History] (in Chinese). Beijing University Press. ISBN 978-7-301-10720-1.
- —— (2007). 北宋政治改革家王安石 [Wang Anshi's Political Reforms During the Northern Song Dynasty] (in Chinese). Sdx Joint Publishing Company. ISBN 978-7-108-02648-4.
- —— (2009). 岳飞传 [Biography of Yue Fei] (in Chinese). Sanxi Normal University Press. ISBN 978-7-5613-4675-4.
- —— (2007). 辛弃疾传, 辛稼轩年谱 [Biography of Xin Qiji & Chronicle of Xin Qiji's Life] (in Chinese). Sdx Joint Publishing Company. ISBN 978-7-108-02647-7.
- —— (2007). 陈龙川传 [Biography of Chen Longchuan] (in Chinese). Sdx Joint Publishing Company. ISBN 978-7-108-02650-7.
- —— (1993). 稼轩词编年笺注 [Annotated Papers of Xin Qiji] (in Chinese). Shanghai Antiquarian Press. ISBN 978-7-5325-1469-4.

This article is based on a translation of 邓广铭 in Chinese Wikipedia
