= Gongsan Dam =

Dam in Jimyo-dong, Dong-gu, Daegu, South Kore

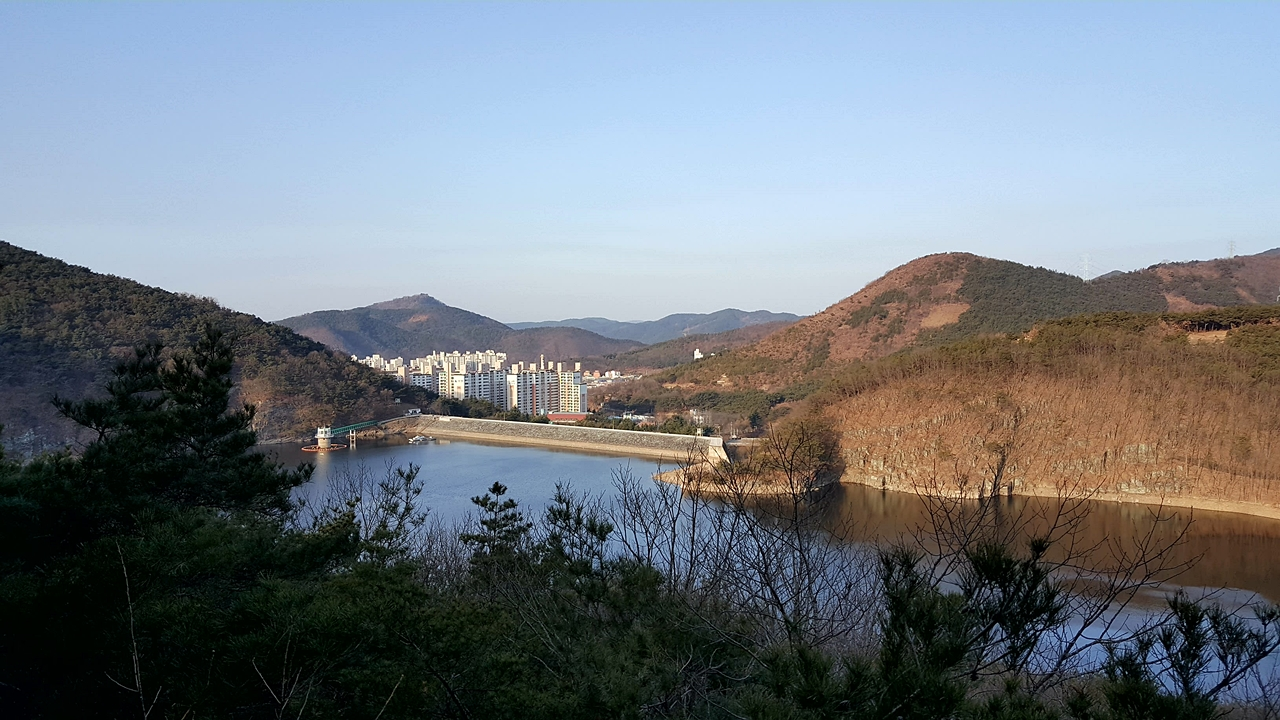
- Gongsan Dam in 2019

- Location within South Korea
- Official name: 공산댐 (Gongsan Daem)
- Country: South Korea
- Location: Jimyo-dong, Dong-gu, Daegu
- Coordinates: 35°56′35″N 128°38′56″E
- Purpose: Water supply
- Status: Operational
- Construction began: 1979
- Opening date: 1981
- Owner: Daegu Metropolitan City
- Operator: Daegu Metropolitan City Waterworks Headquarters

Dam and spillways
- Type of dam: Rockfill dam
- Impounds: Donghwacheon (동화천)
- Length: 239 m (784 ft)
- Elevation at crest: 101.2 m (332 ft)

Reservoir
- Creates: Gongsanji (공산지) or Gongsanho (공산호)
- Total capacity: 5.5×10^{6} m^{3} (4,500 acre⋅ft)
- Active capacity: 4.5×10^{6} m^{3} (3,600 acre⋅ft)
- Catchment area: 60.3 km^{2} (23.3 sq mi)
- Surface area: 0.380 km^{2} (94 acres)
- Normal elevation: 96.0 m (315.0 ft)

Gongsan Purification Plant (공산정수장)
- Operator: Daegu Metropolitan City Waterworks Headquarters
- Commission date: 1982
- Installed capacity: 40,000 to 55,000 m^{3}/d (1,400,000 to 1,900,000 cu ft/d)

- Gongsan Dam
- Hangul: 공산댐
- Hanja: 公山댐
- RR: Gongsan daem
- MR: Kongsan taem

Gongsan Dam (공산댐 ) is a dam in Jimyo-dong, Dong-gu, Daegu, South Korea. Built across the Donghwacheon stream flowing south from Palgongsan, the dam is responsible for securing the water supply for much of northern Daegu.

The dam's construction began in 1979 and was completed in 1981. Since then, the use of much of the surrounding land has been restricted, due to concerns that development might lead to a loss of water quality. Local residents have protested these restrictions from time to time.

Daegu City deployed drones over Gongsanji (공산지), the reservoir, to monitor water quality and environmental changes in 2022.

== See also ==
- List of dams
