= Gongsan-dong =

Coordinates: 35°56′24″N 128°38′21″E

- Hangul: 공산동
- Hanja: 公山洞
- RR: Gongsan-dong
- MR: Kongsan-dong

Gongsan-dong (Korean: 공산동) is an administrative dong (neighborhood) in Dong-gu, in northeastern Daegu, South Korea. It has an area of 83.78 km^{2}, most of which is vacant; its population is only 18,177. Slightly more than half of the people live in the dong's 38 apartment blocks.

The dong was first constituted in 1981. For much of the 1980s and 1990s, it was divided into two administrative dong, but these were reunited into Gongsan-dong in 1998.

Gongsan Dam, which supplies drinking water for much of northern Daegu, is also located within the boundaries of Gongsan-dong. Land use in much of the dong is restricted due to regulations protecting the water supply and natural environment.

== Legal dong ==
Because of the relatively low population density, Gongsan-dong encompasses a total of 14 legal dong. This is the reverse of the usual situation in urban areas, where legal dong are subdivided into numerous administrative dong.

- Jimyo-dong (智妙洞, 지묘동), site of the shrine of Sin Sung-gyŏm
- Dohak-dong (道鶴洞, 도학동), site of Donghwasa temple
- Neungseong-dong (능성동)
- Jinin-dong (진인동)
- Baegan-dong (백안동)
- Migok-dong (미곡동)
- Yongsu-dong (용수동)
- Sinmu-dong (신무동)
- Midae-dong (미대동)
- Nae-dong (내동)
- Deokgok-dong (덕곡동)
- Songjeong-dong (송정동)
- Sinyong-dong (신용동)
- Jungdae-dong (중대동)

== See also ==
- Geography of South Korea
- Subdivisions of South Korea
