= Nodongdang =

- Hangul: 노동당
- Hanja: 勞動黨
- RR: Nodongdang
- MR: Nodongdang

North Korean name
- Hangul: 로동당
- Hanja: 勞動黨
- RR: Rodongdang
- MR: Rodongdang

Nodongdang (Korean: 노동당) or Rodongdang (Korean: 로동당), literally Labor Party (or Workers' Party) may also refer to:

== Korea (1945-1948) ==
- Socialist Labour Party (Korea) (1946-1947)
- Workers' Party of North Korea (1946-1949)
- Workers' Party of South Korea (1946-1949)

== North Korea (1948-) ==
- Workers' Party of Korea (1949-)

== South Korea (1948-) ==
- Democratic Labor Party (South Korea) (2000-2012)
- Labor Party (South Korea) (2013-)

== See also ==
- Jinbodang (disambiguation)
- Minjudang (disambiguation)
