= Jinbodang =

- Hangul: 진보당
- Hanja: 進步黨
- RR: Jinbodang
- MR: Chinbodang

Jinbodang (Korean: 진보당), literally Progressive Party may also refer to:

- Progressive Party (South Korea), political party from 1956 to 1958.
- Youth Progressive Party, also known as the Socialist Party.
- Unified Progressive Party, political party from 2011 to 2014.
- Progressive Party (South Korea, 2017)

== See also ==
- New Progressive Party (South Korea), also known as the Labor Party since July 2013.
- Progressive Justice Party, also known as the Justice Party since July 2013.
- Minjudang (disambiguation)
- Nodongdang (disambiguation)
