= Minjudang =

- Hangul: 민주당
- Hanja: 民主黨
- RR: Minjudang
- MR: Minjudang

Minjudang (Korean: 민주당), literally the Democratic Party, may refer to:

== North Korea ==
- Korean Social Democratic Party

== South Korea ==
- Korea Democratic Party, 1945–1949
- Democratic Party (South Korea, 1955), 1955–1963
- New Democratic Party (South Korea), 1967-1980
- New Korean Democratic Party, 1984-1988
- Reunification Democratic Party informally known as Democratic Party (1987)
- Democratic Party (South Korea, 1990)
- Democratic Party (South Korea, 1991)
- Democratic Party (South Korea, 1995), 1995–1997, merged with Grand National Party
- Democratic Party (South Korea, 2000), 2000–2007, "New Millennium Democratic Party" and "New Politics Congress"
- Democratic Party (South Korea, 2007), 2007–2008, "Centrist Reformists Democratic Party"
- Democratic Party (South Korea, 2008), 2008–2011, "United New Democratic Party" and "United Democratic Party"
- Democratic Party (South Korea, 2011), 2011–2014, "Democratic United Party"
- Minjoo Party (2014), 2014–2016, merged with Democratic Party of Korea
- Democratic Party (South Korea, 2015), "New Politics Alliance for Democracy", then "Together Democratic Party"

== See also ==
- Conservatism in South Korea
  - Democratic Nationalist Party (South Korea)
  - Democratic Republican Party (South Korea)
  - Democratic Justice Party
  - New Korea Party
  - United Liberal Democrats
- Progressivism in South Korea
  - Democratic Labor Party (South Korea)
- Liberalism in South Korea
- Jinbodang (disambiguation)
- Nodongdang (disambiguation)
- Democratic Party (disambiguation)
