= Timeline of history of Assam =

Timeline of the History of Assam, the important dates in its history against important events elsewhere.

Year	Ancient Assam (350 - 1206)	Contemporaneous events	Date source
350	Pushyavarman establishes the Varman dynasty in Kamarupa		(Barpujari 1990:94)
636	Xuanzang visits the court of Bhaskarvarman in Kamarupa.		
650	Bhaskarvarman dies. End of Varman dynasty		
655	Salasthamba establishes Mlechchha dynasty in Kamarupa		
900	Brahmapala establishes Pala dynasty in Kamarupa		
c1100	Jayapala, the last Pala king removed by Ramapala of Pala empire		
1187	Birpal establishes Chutiya kingdom at Swarnagiri		
Year	Medieval Assam (1206–1826)	Contemporaneous events	Date source
	13th century		
1206	The first Muslim invasion, Bakhtiar Khilji is thwarted and his army destroyed. Beginning of the medieval period in Assam		
1228	Sukaphaa enters Assam		(Gogoi 1968:265)
1224	Ratnadhwajpal the second Chutiya king annexes the Kingdoms of Bhadrasena and Nyayapal		
1228	Chutiya kingdom expedition against Kamatapur		
1248	Ratnadhwajpal establishes his capital at Sadiya		
1252	Sukaphaa establishes capital at Charaideo		(Gogoi 1968:265)
1257	Sandhya, a ruler of Kamarupa, moves his capital west and thus established the Kamata kingdom.		
	14th century		
1362	Sikandar Shah attacks Kamata kingdom and weakens the ruler Indranarayan		
1392	Chutia king Satyanarayan's first land grant record in Habung. This is the first recorded land grant given to Brahmins in Upper Assam found till date.		(Neog 1977:816)
	15th century		
1449	Srimanta Sankardev is born		
1490	First Ahom-Dimasa battle. Ahoms defeated under Konkhra and pursued for peace.		
1498	Alauddin Hussain Shah of Gaur removes the last Khen ruler of Kamata kingdom	Vasco da Gama lands at Calicut	(Barpujari 1992:47)
	16th century		
1515	Viswa Singha establishes Koch political power and Koch dynasty		(Barpujari 1992:70)
1520	Ahoms defeated by Chutiya king Dharmadhwajpal		
1524	Chutiya kingdom partially annexed to Ahom Kingdom under Suhungmung, and placed under the rule of Sadiyakhowa Gohain.		(Gogoi 1968:287)
1527	Nusrat Shah's invasion, the first Muslim invasion of the Ahom kingdom, ends in failure.		(Barpujari 1992:133)
1532	Turbak attacks Ahom Kingdom, the first commander to enjoy some success.		
1533	Turbak defeated and killed. Ahoms pursue Gaur army to Karatoya river.		
1536	Ahoms destroy Dimapur, the capital of the Kachari kingdom		
1540	Nara Narayan succeeds his father to the throne of Kamata kingdom		
1563	Chilarai occupies Ahom capital Garhgaon, end with Treaty of Majuli.		(Barpujari 1992:79–80)
1568	Srimanta Sankardev dies		
1581	Nara Narayana divides Kamata kingdom into Koch Bihar and Koch Hajo (to be governed by Raghudev)		(Barpujari 1992:94)
1587	Naranarayana of Koch dynasty dies.		(Barpujari 1992:74)
1588	Raghudev, son of Chilarai and ruler of Koch Hajo declares independence		(Barpujari 1992:95)
	17th century		
1609	Momai Tamuli Borbarua restructures Paik system in Ahom kingdom.		
1609	Koch Bihar becomes a Mughal vassal		(Barpujari 1992:98)
1613	Koch Hajo is annexed by the Mughal Empire		(Barpujari 1992:103)
1615	Ahom-Mughal conflicts begin		(Barpujari 1992:148)
1637	Bali Narayan dies of natural causes, and Koch rebellion again Mughals collapse		(Barpujari 1992:161)
1639	Treaty of Asurar Ali signed between the Ahom kingdom and Mughal Empire		(Barpujari 1992:164)
1659	Ahoms take possession of Koch Hajo (up to Sankosh river). Koch Hajo was occupied by rulers of Koch Bihar earlier, who drove out the Mughal faujdar from Guwahati		(Barpujari 1992:165)
1662	Mir Jumla occupies Garhgaon, the Ahom capital		(Barpujari 1992:177–178)
1663	After Treaty of Ghilajharighat Mir Jumla returns to Dhaka, dies on the way		(Barpujari 1992:188–189)
1667	Ahoms wrest Guwahati and extend control up to Manas river; begins defence preparations		(Barpujari 1992:207)
1668	Mughals under Ram Singh I advance up to Guwahati to retake it		(Barpujari 1992:211)
1671	Ahoms win Battle of Saraighat and Ram Singh I retreats to Rangamati		(Barpujari 1992:227)
1679	Laluksola Borphukan deserts Guwahati		(Barpujari 1992:245)
1681	Gadadhar Singha becomes Ahom swargadeo		(Barpujari 1992:252)
1682	Ahoms win Battle of Itakhuli. End of Ahom-Mughal conflicts with Ahom win		(Barpujari 1992:253–256)
	18th century		
1714	Rudra Singha dies, and with him dies the Kachari, Tiwa, Jaintia etc. grand alliance to remove the Mughals from Bengal		(Gogoi 1968:503–507)
1769	First phase of Moamoria rebellion, Ahom capital falls but recaptured in April, 1770		
1783	Ahom capital Rangpur fell the second time to Moamoria rebellion. Rebel leaders strike coins in their names		(Baruah 1993:90)
1794	Captain Thomas Welsh restores Rangpur to Ahom king from Moamora rebels		(Baruah 1993:133)
	19th century		
1805	Ahoms come to terms with Sarbananda, the last Moamora rebel leader holding out in Bengmara (Tinsukia). Ahoms declare Sarbananda the Barsenapati of Matak Rajya		(Baruah 1993:164)
1817	The first Burmese invasion of Assam. Burmese occupation was complete by 1821		(Baruah 1993:213)
Year	Colonial Assam (1826–1947)	Contemporaneous events	Date source
1826	Treaty of Yandaboo signed between East India Company and King of Burma; end of Burmese and beginning of British occupation of Assam		(Barpujari 1992:363)
1861	Phulaguri Dhawa, the first peasant uprising against British rule was repressed		
1894	Patharughat raijmel fired upon, villagers tortured and property confiscated		(Guha 1977:53–54)
Year	Post Colonial Assam (1947-)	Contemporaneous events	Date source
1979	Assam agitation begins		
1985	Assam Accord signed. End of Assam agitation		
