= Rajpat =

Archaeological site in West Bengal, India

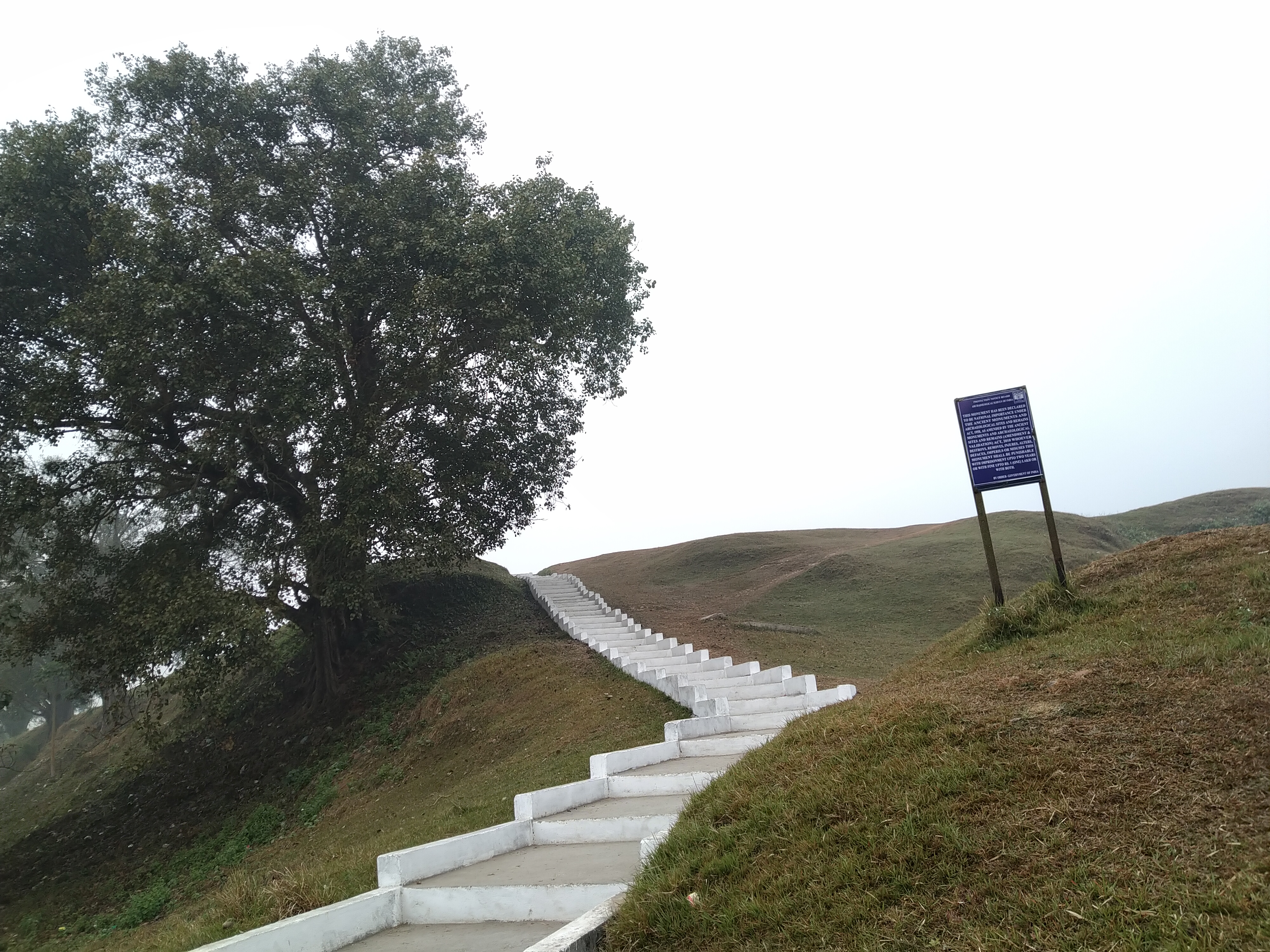
- Mound of Rajpat

- Location within West Bengal Location within India
- 26.1518°N 89.3502°E
- Type: Fort
- Periods: Pala Empire, Sena dynasty, Khen dynasty
- Location: West Bengal, India
- Region: Cooch Behar

History
- Built: 11–12th century AD
- Abandoned: 1498

Rajpat or Kamtapur Fort is an archaeological site in present-day Gosanimari in the Dinhata I CD block in the Dinhata subdivision of the Cooch Behar district in West Bengal, India.

== History ==
The site was originally a fortified settlement belonging to the 10th-11th century Kamarupa Pala era. The area was settled by the late 14th century as evident from the coin of Ghiyasuddin Azam Shah who invaded Kamata kingdom at the end of the 14th century. Later, the Khen dynasty replaced the weak rulers of the Kamata kingdom in the middle of the 15th century. There were only three Khen rulers. The last king, Nilambar expanded the kingdom to include the present Koch Bihar district of West Bengal, the undivided Kamrup and Darrang districts of Assam, northern Mymensingh, now in Bangladesh, and eastern parts of Dinajpur district. In 1498, its last capital at Gosanimari was attacked by the invading army of Alauddin Husain Shah of Bengal, bringing an end to the Khen authority.

== Geography ==
Places in the Tufanganj and Dinhata subdivisions (except Sitai CD block) in Cooch Behar district
CT: census town, M: municipal town, R: rural/ urban centre, H: historical/ religious centre
Owing to space constraints in the small map, the actual locations in a larger map may vary slightly

=== Location ===
Rajpat is located at 26.1518°N 89.3502°E

The Kamtapur Fort was spread from the Dharla River in the east to Godaikhora in the west, and from Sitalabas in the north to Silduar-Soawariganj in the south. The palace was in the centre of the fort and is now referred to as Rajpat.

Note: The map alongside presents some of the notable locations in the subdivisions. All places marked in the map are linked in the larger full screen map.

== The fort ==
The fort was surrounded by a horse-shoe type high earthen wall running for around 22 kilometres (14 mi) and was open only on the side where the Dharla River was there. Now, it is mostly around 30 feet high and 35 feet wide. It was higher and wider in earlier days. The fort had seven entrance doors. There was a 250 feet wide float all around it. There was a system of providing regular water for it. Various people visiting the fort in the earlier days had seen many roads, temples, ponds and other utilities. In 1808, Dr. Buchanan Hamilton, visited the place and saw many broken structures. He also saw two brick-built walls inside the earthen enclosures. He left behind a detailed report. Now, all one can see is a large mound strewn with broken pieces of structures. Many statues or interesting items found in the fort have been kept aside for visitors to see.

== Archaeological Survey of India ==
According to the List of Monuments of National Importance in West Bengal Rajpat is an ASI listed monument.

Excavations were carried out in 1998–2000, by the Archaeological Survey of India at the Rajpat Mound. Only a few antiquities and some pottery have been found. The pottery bears similarity with pottery made/ used in Assam, some of the antiquities indicate their belonging to the Pala-Sena period of the 11-12th century. The excavations do point to the place having come up before the Khen dynasty captured it.

== Rajpat mound picture gallery ==
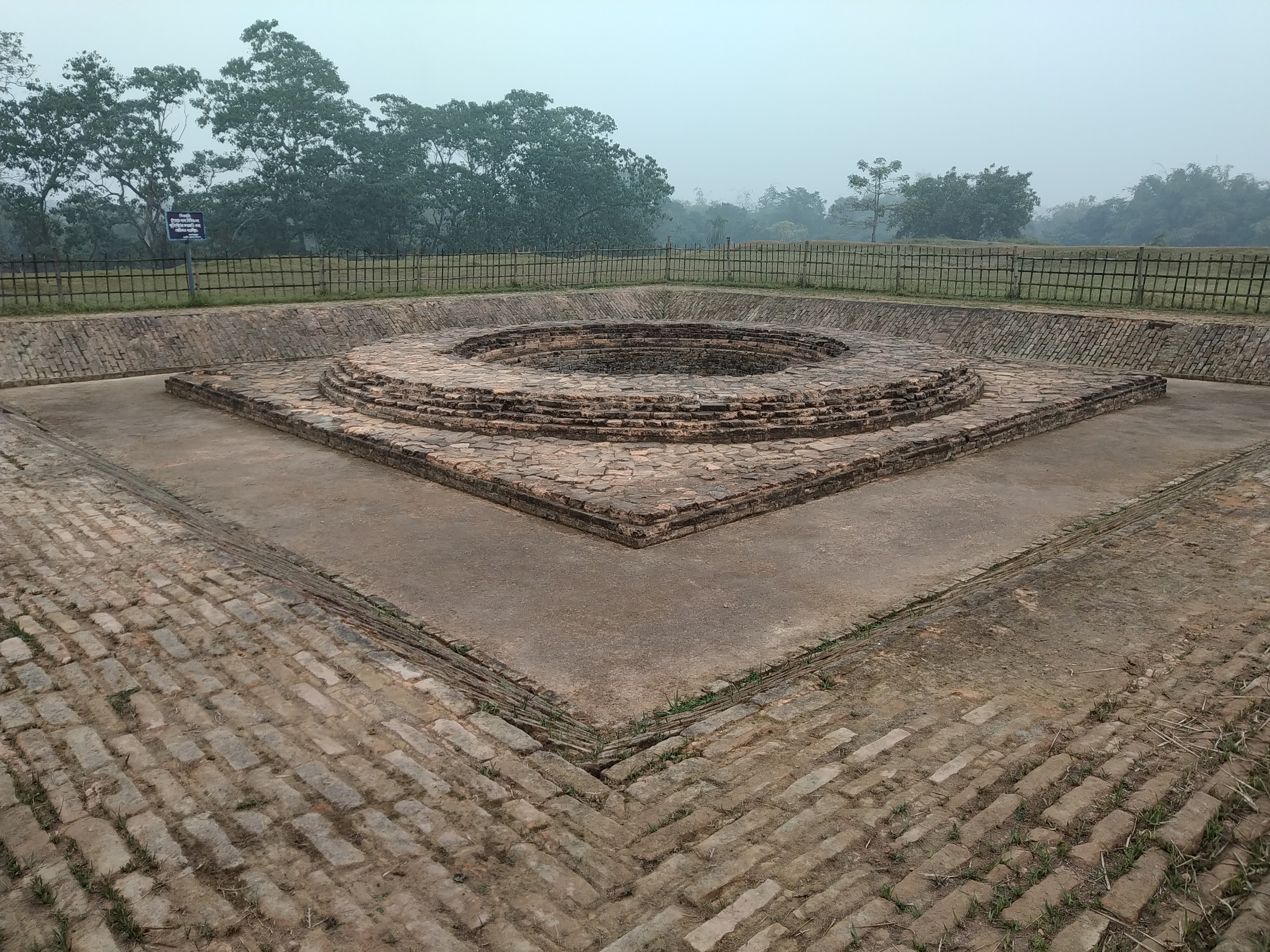

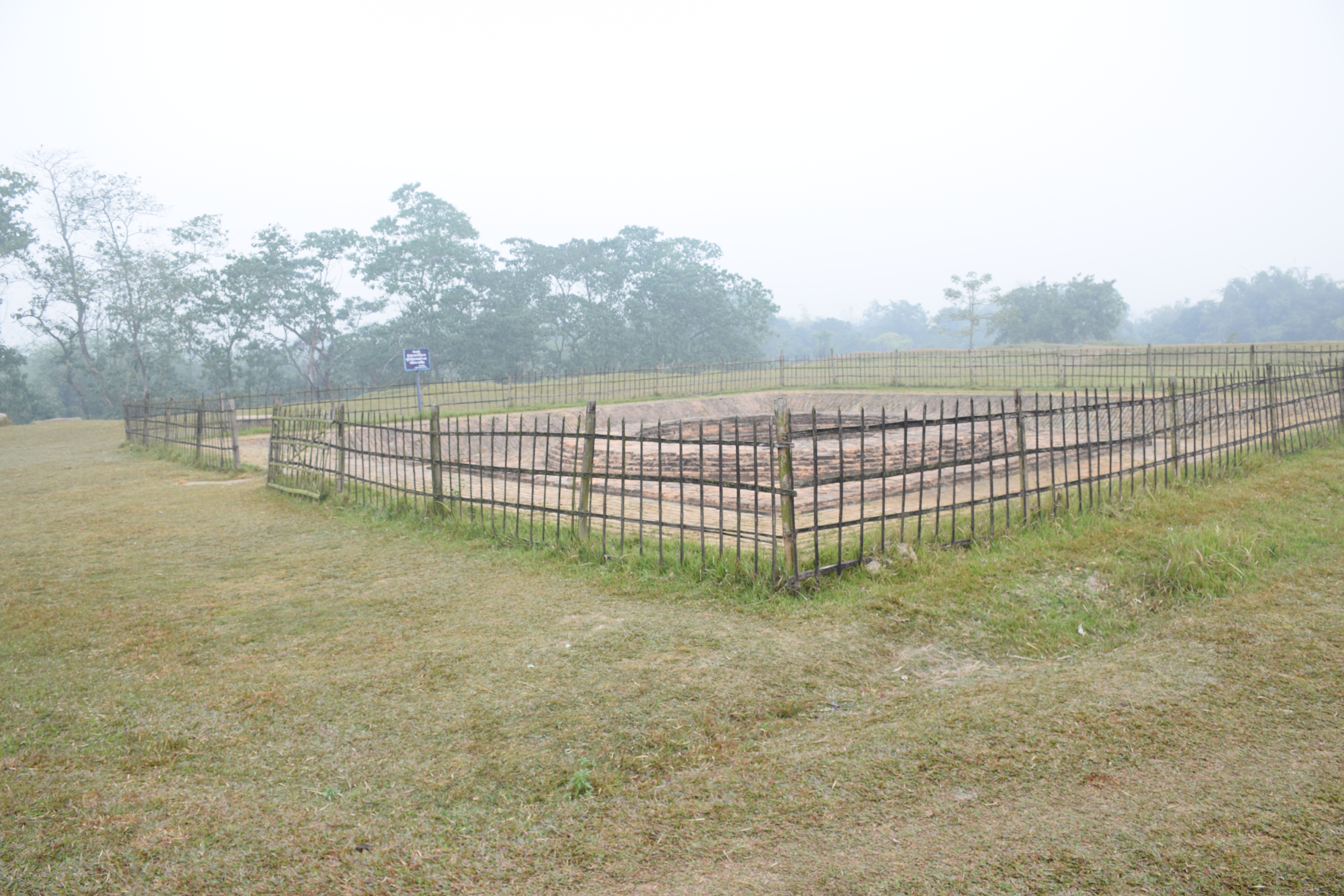

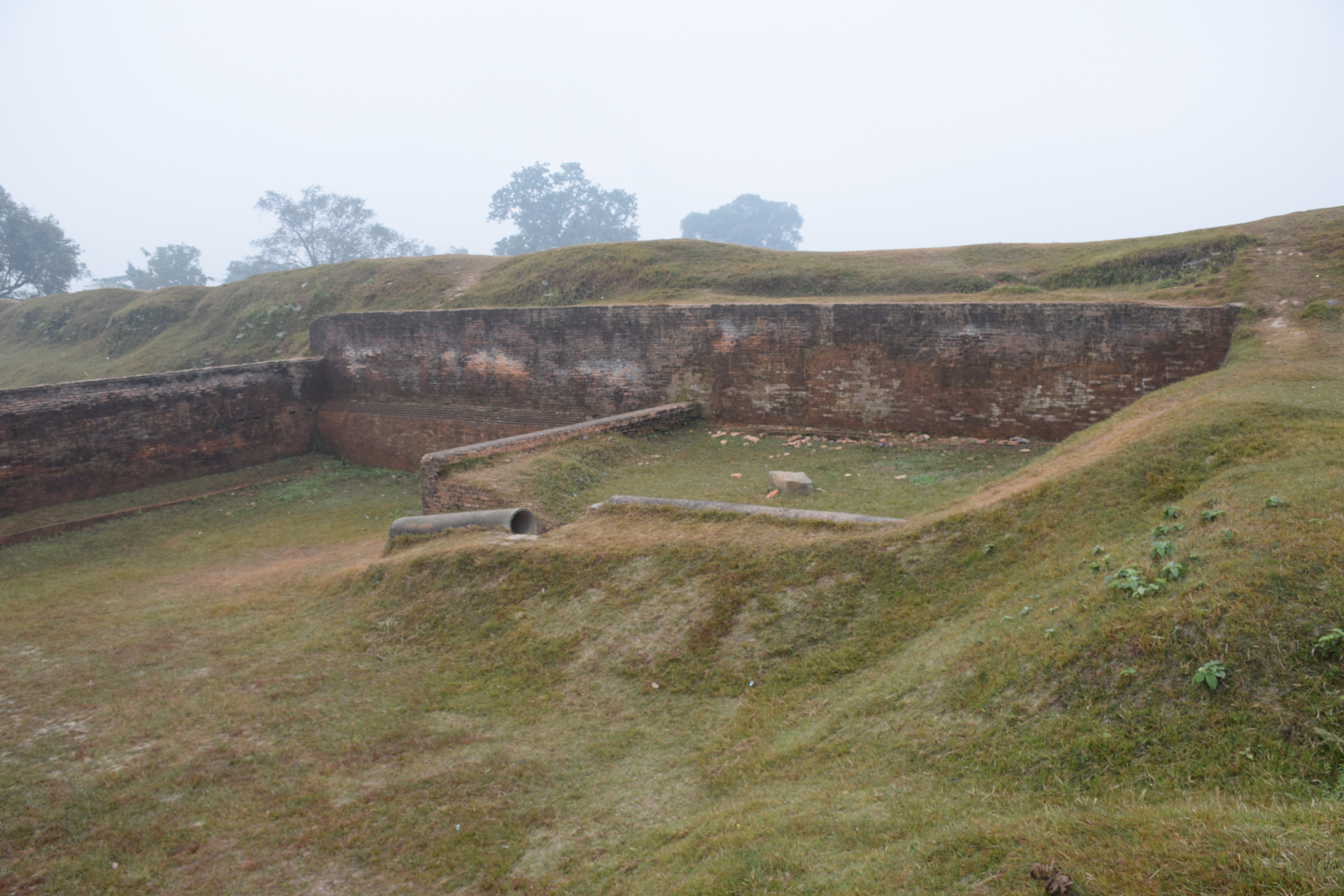

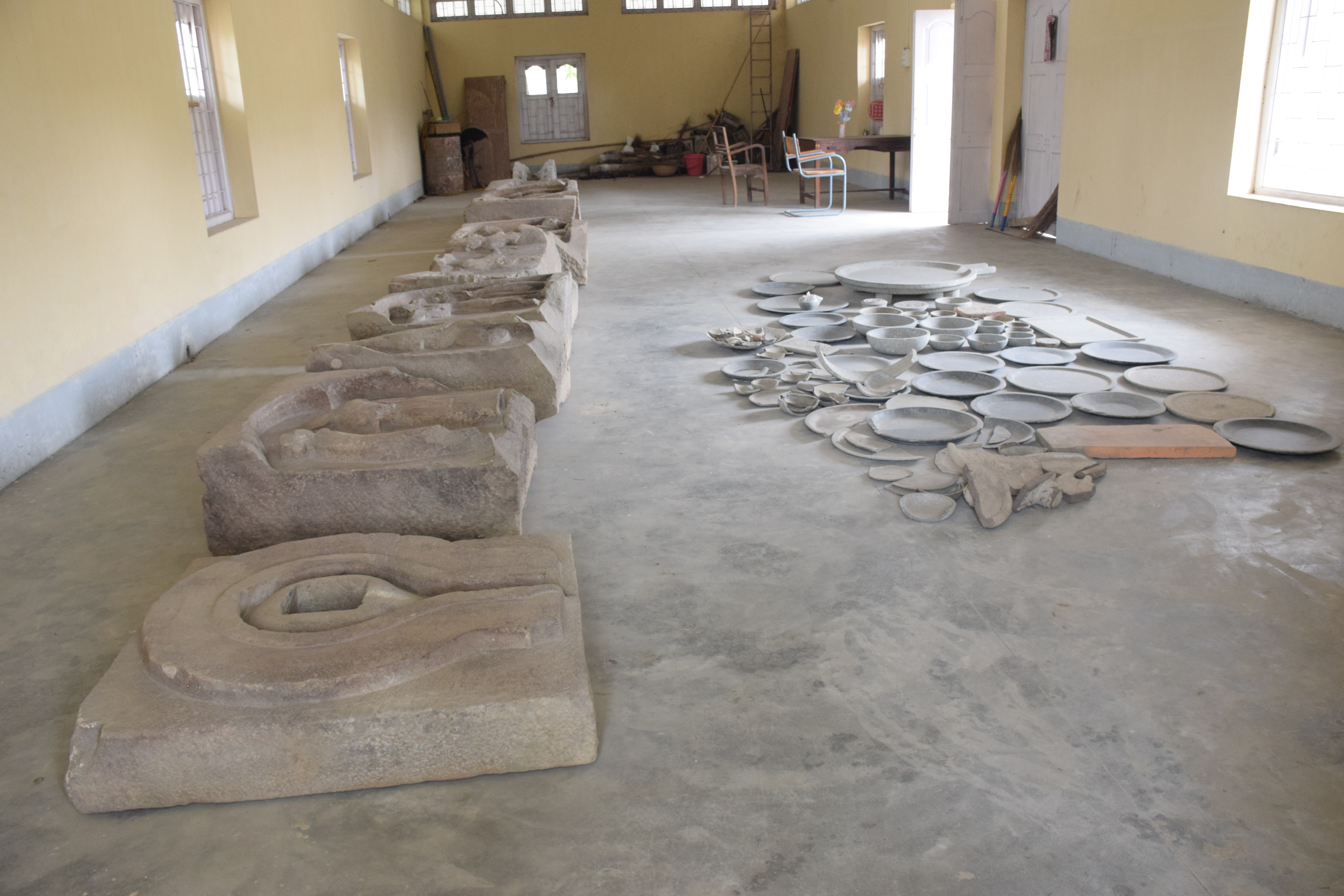

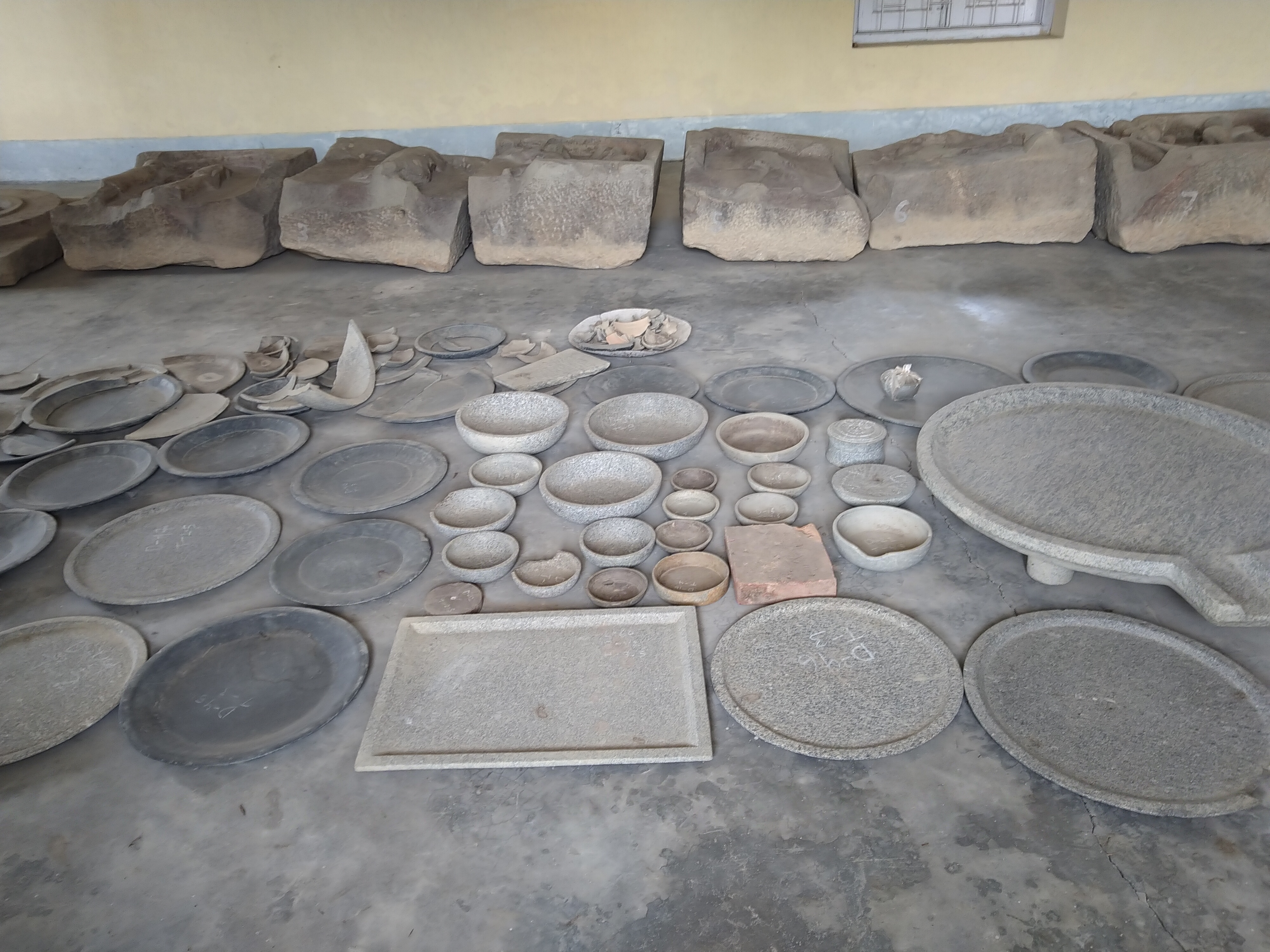

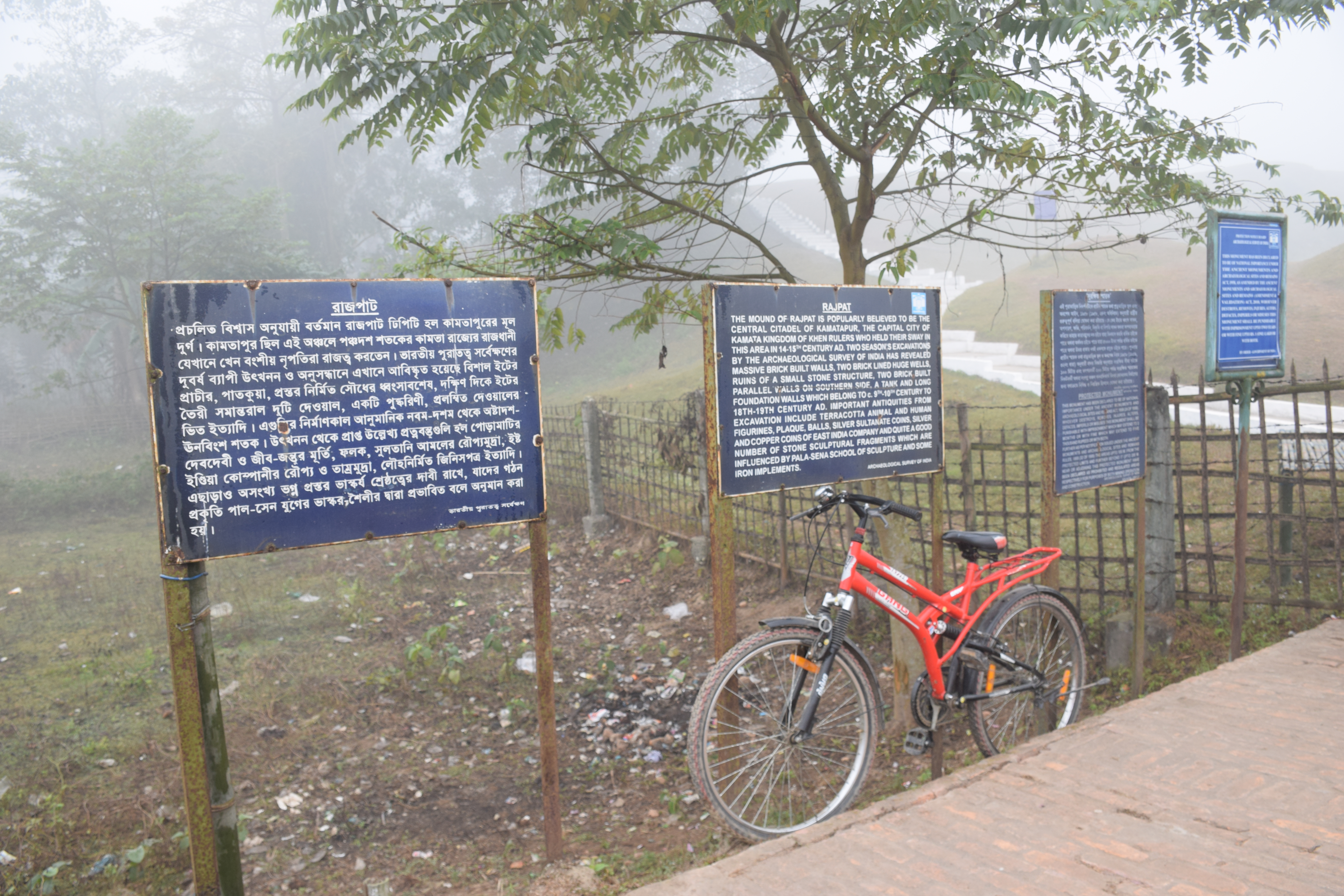
