= Bengal–Kamata War =

Late 15th century conflict in Bengal

Bengal Sultanate–Kamata Kingdom War
Date	1498
Location	North Bengal and Western Assam
Result	Bengal Sultanate's victory
Territorial changes	Bengal Sultanate annexes upto Hajo

Belligerents
Bengal Sultanate	Kamata Kingdom

Commanders and leaders
Hussain Shah; Shah Ismail Ghazi; Shahzada Danyal; Musundar Ghazi	Nilambar

Strength
~20,000 Cavalary; ~40,000 Infantry; ~100 ships	Large; ~15,000 cavalry ~50,000 infantry ~200 ships many war elephants and up to ~10,000 sailors/mariners

Casualties and losses
Low	Nearly the whole army

The Bengal Sultanate–Kamata Kingdom War was a late 15th century conflict between the Kamata Kingdom and the Bengal Sultanate. As a result of the conflict the Khen dynasty was overthrown and the Bengal Sultanate extended its domain up to the Hajo in what is present day western Assam by 1502. Nevertheless, the Sultanate administration was removed in about ten years by the Assamese Bhuyans led by Harup Narayan.

== Invasion ==
The conquest was instigated by Sachipatra, a Brahmin whose son was executed by King Nilambar for his promiscuity with the queen. In 1499, Sultan Alauddin Husain Shah dispatched an army under the command of Shah Ismail Ghazi to conquer Kamata. Ghazi's forces besieged the Kamatapur fort and destroyed the city. Hussain Shah imprisoned Nilambar of Kamata and ended the reign of the Khen dynasty. Though Kamatapur fell in 1498, Hussain Shah was able to annex up to Hajo not before 1502.

== Aftermath ==
The region was brought under the administration of Sultanate governors in Hajo. Hussain Shah minted coins with the proclamation "conqueror of Kāmrū, Kamata, Jajnagar and Urisa". He also publicly inscribed the victory at a stone in Malda. The Sultan appointed his son, Shahzada Danyal, as the governor of the newly conquered region; that reached up to Hajo and intended to expand to Central Assam. Daniyal later fell to the Assamese Bhuyans within Hussein Shah's lifetime and his rule ended.
