= Niladhwaj of Kamata =

King of Kamata from 1440 to 1460

Niladhwaj
- King

King of Kamata
- Reign: 1440–1460
- Predecessor: Mriganka
- Successor: Chakradhwaj
- Died: 1460
- Dynasty: Khen dynasty

Niladhwaj (reigned 1440–1460) was a king of the Kamata kingdom and founder of the Khen dynasty. He ruled from the city of Kamatapur (now called Gosanimari) and was succeeded by his son Chakradhwaj.

Niladhwaj of Kamata Khen dynasty
Preceded by Mriganka	King of Kamata; 1440-1460	Succeeded by Chakradhwaj
