= Danyal (Hussain Shahi dynasty) =

Danyal Dulal Ghazi
- Shahzādā-i-Bangālah

Governor of Bihar under Bengal Sultanate
- Reign: 1495–1498

Governor of Kamata under Bengal Sultanate
- Reign: 1498–
- Successor: Musundar Ghazi
- Born: Dānyāl bin Ḥusayn; Bengal Sultanate
- Died: Kamata Kingdom
- Spouse: Lal Bai (concubine)
- Issue: Musundar Ghazi
- House: Hussain Shahi
- Father: Alauddin Husain Shah
- Religion: Sunni Islam

Dānyāl, Prince of Bengal (Persian: شاهزاده دانیال بنگالی, d. 1500s), also known as Dulāl Ghāzī (Bengali–Assamese: দুলাল গাজী), was the eldest son of the Sultan of Bengal Alauddin Hussain Shah. He performed official duties and engagements on behalf of his father. In 1495, Danyal secured a peace treaty with the Delhi Sultanate in Bihar, and served as the regional governor of Bihar under the Bengal Sultanate. He was appointed as the governor of Kamata following its conquest in 1498.

== Early life and background ==
Danyal was born in the 15th-century into an aristocratic Bengali Muslim Sunni Syed family in the Bengal Sultanate. In 1494, his father Husain, the Wazir (prime minister) of Bengal, established a new ruling dynasty of the Sultanate after defeating Sultan Shamsuddin Muzaffar Shah. Danyal is thought to be the eldest son of Husain Shah. Among his seventeen or twenty-three other brothers and at least eleven sisters, Nasrat and Mahmud were future Sultans of Bengal.

== Crown Princeship ==
As the prince of the Sultanate of Bengal, Danyal played several important roles during his father's reign. Sikandar Lodi, the Afghan ruler of the Delhi Sultanate, led an expedition to Bengal in 1495 as a result of Danyal's father granting refuge to Hussain Shah Sharqi of the defeated Jaunpur Sultanate. Danyal was appointed by his father to command the Bengali army against Lodi's forces. The two armies faced off at Barh, and Danyal managed to conclude a treaty, thus saving Bengal from a possible invasion. The treaty made the town of Barh the official border of the two sultanates.

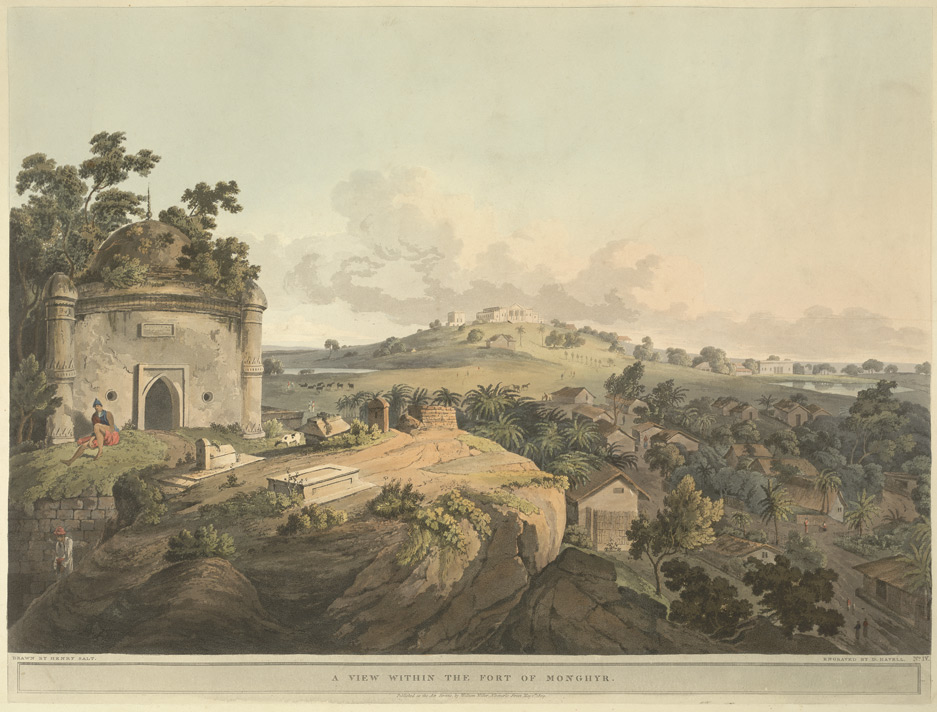
Danyal is credited for the construction of Shah Nafa's mausoleum in Munger.

In 903 AH (1497-1498 CE), Danyal was responsible for the construction of a vault at the Munger Fort in Bihar and an inscription commemorating this was hung on the eastern wall of the nearby Dargah of Shah Nafa (also known as Pir Nafa). There are also local legends about Danyal that are prevalent, and it is generally thought that Danyal ultimately constructed the dargah too.

In 1498, Shah Ismail Ghazi conquered Kamata by defeating King Nilambar of the Khen dynasty. Following the victory, Danyal's father appointed him as the governor of the newly conquered region; that reached up to Hajo and intended to expand to Central Assam.

On Eid al-Adha 905 AH (July 1500), Danyal constructed a congregational mosque in Bengal. During Danyal's governorship, his concubine Lal Bai established the town of Lalbazar in Kamatapur. Danyal governed Kamata for several more years until the Assamese Bhuyans led by Harup Narayan led a campaign against him. In this campaign, the Bhuyans seized and killed Danyal and his officers, thus ending the Sultanate's short rule over the territory some time before 1509. According to the Riyaz-us-Salatin, Musunder Ghazi succeeded Daniyal as governor of Kamata. The Assam Buranji also reiterates this claim, asserting that Musunder Ghazi was Daniyal’s son, and he had died before Bishwa Singha's ascension in 1515.

== See also ==
- List of rulers of Bengal
- History of Bengal
- History of India

== Bibliography ==
- Baruah, S L (1986), A Comprehensive History of Assam, New Delhi: Munshiram Manoharlal Publishers Pvt. Ltd.
- Nath, D. (1989), History of the Koch Kingdom, c. 1515–1615, Mittal Publications, ISBN 8170991099
- Sarkar, J N (1992). "Chapter IV: Early Rulers of Koch Bihar". In Barpujari, H. K. (ed.). The Comprehensive History of Assam. Vol. 2. Guwahati: Assam Publication Board.
- Sarkar, Jadunath, ed. (1973) [First published 1948]. "VII: The Husain Shāhī Dynasty". The History of Bengal. Vol. II: Muslim Period, 1200–1757. Patna: Academica Asiatica. OCLC 924890.
