= Kamteswari Temple =

Temple in Coochbehar

Kamteswari temple
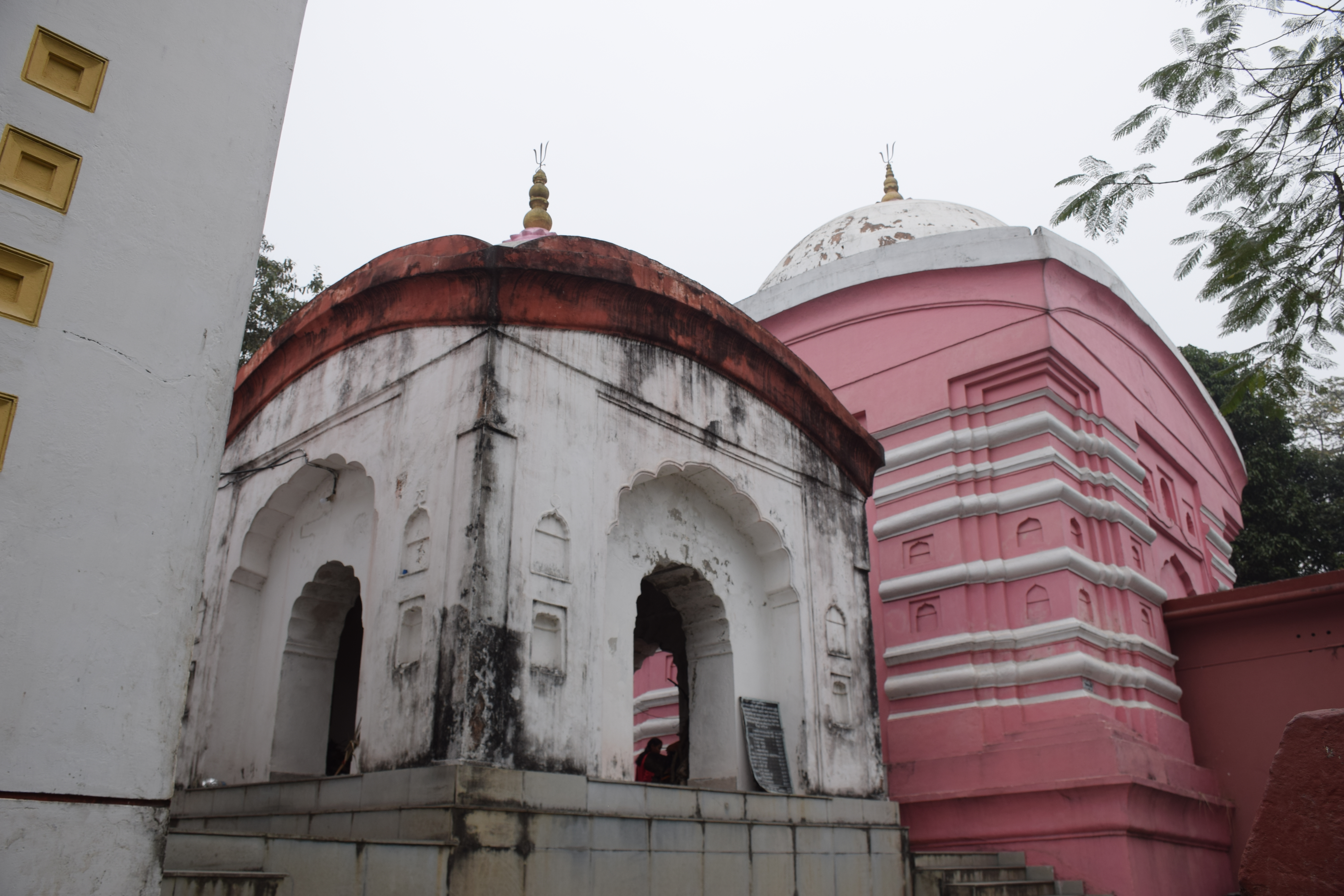
- Gosanimari Kamteshwari Temple

- Location within West Bengal Location within India

Religion
- Affiliation: Hinduism

Location
- Location: Gosanimari
- State: West Bengal
- Country: India
- Interactive map of Kamteswari temple
- Coordinates: 26.1414°N 89.3632°E

Kamteswari Temple is a Hindu temple dedicated to Hindu goddess Kamteswari. It is located at Gosanimari in the Dinhata I CD block in the Dinhata subdivision of the Cooch Behar district in West Bengal, India.

== Geography ==
Places in the Tufanganj and Dinhata subdivisions (except Sitai CD block) in Cooch Behar district
CT: census town, M: municipal town, R: rural/ urban centre, H: historical/ religious centre
Owing to space constraints in the small map, the actual locations in a larger map may vary slightly

=== Location ===
Kamteswari temple is at 26.1414°N 89.3632°E.

It is about 8 kilometres (5.0 mi) from Dinhata railway station.

Note: The map alongside presents some of the notable locations in the subdivisions. All places marked in the map are linked in the larger full screen map.

== The temple ==
There have been various opinions about who built the temple, because both the Khen and the Koch dynasties were worshippers of goddess Kamteswari(KārttiKamātakṣenaṃkarī). It is now accepted that the original temple was destroyed and the present temple was built by Maharaja Pran Narayan of the Cooch Behar State in 1665.

The main temple roof has been built in the Bengal char chala style having a curved cornish with a circular dome atop. There are two entrances to the temple, the main entrance being on the west and another on the north. There is a nahabatkhana at the main entrance to the temple. The temple is 14 metres (46 ft) high and has a square base of 9.9 metres (32 ft).

Deities inside the temple are two Shiva lingas, an idol of Brahma, a Shalagram/ Narayan shila, an idol of Gopal made of ashtadhatu (alloy of eight metals) and a bronze idol of Surya. There is another Surya idol of the Pal-era on the northern wall of the temple and a Vishnu idol, also of the Pal era, in the south-eastern corner of the temple. Both the latter idols have been brought from somewhere else and placed here. There is another Shiva linga in the south western part of the temple.

The Kamteswari temple is a state protected monument.

== Kamteswari temple picture gallery ==
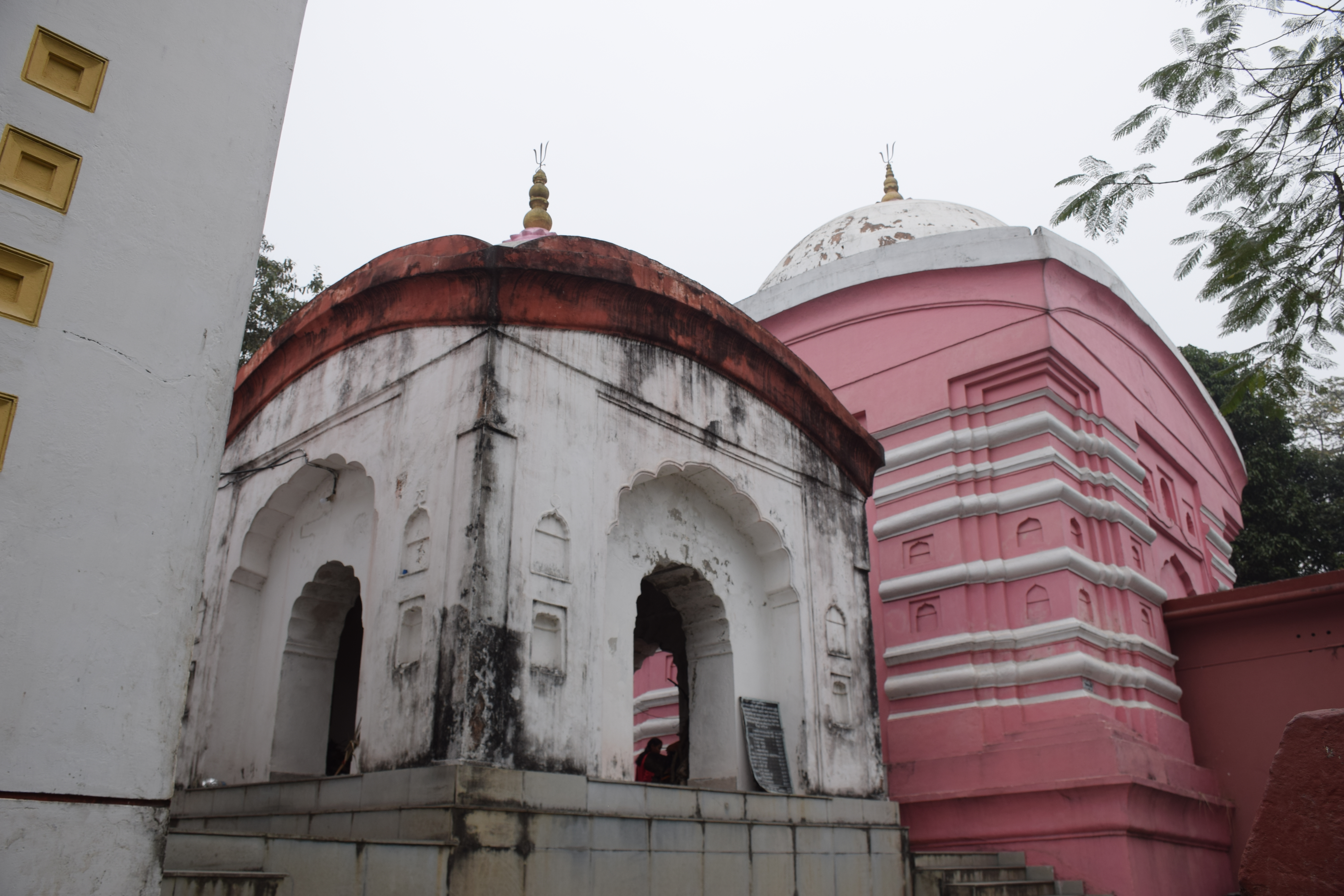

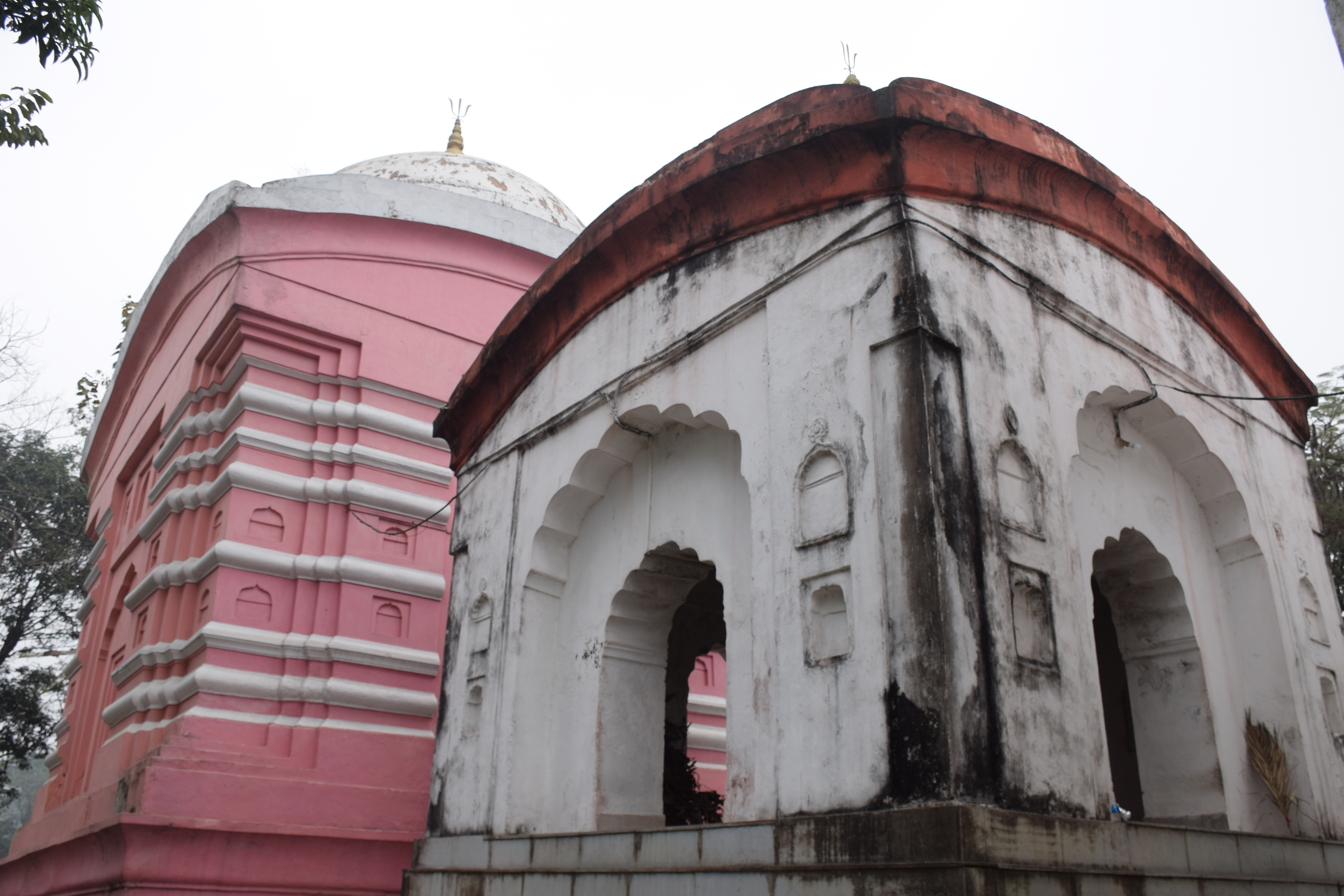

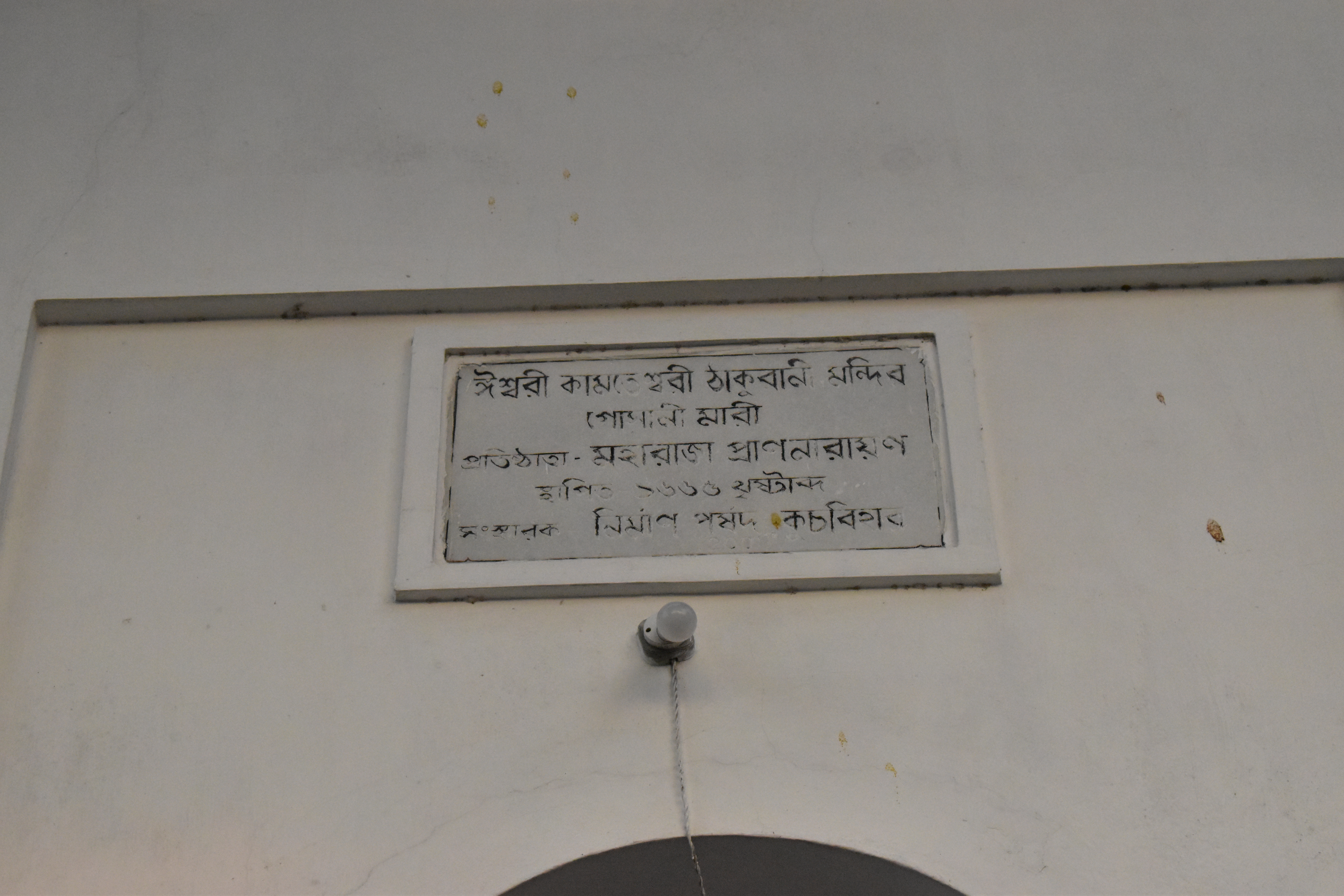

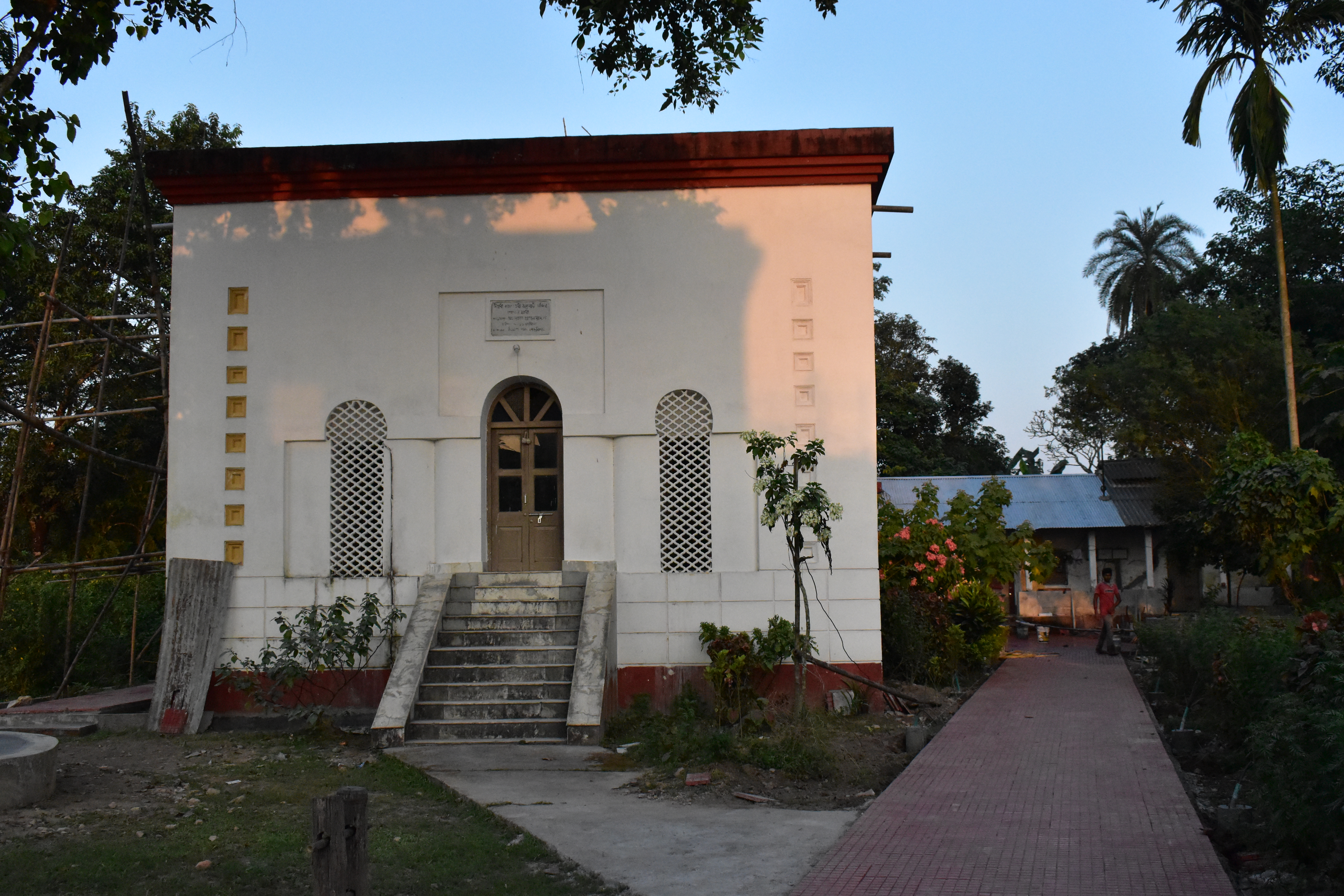

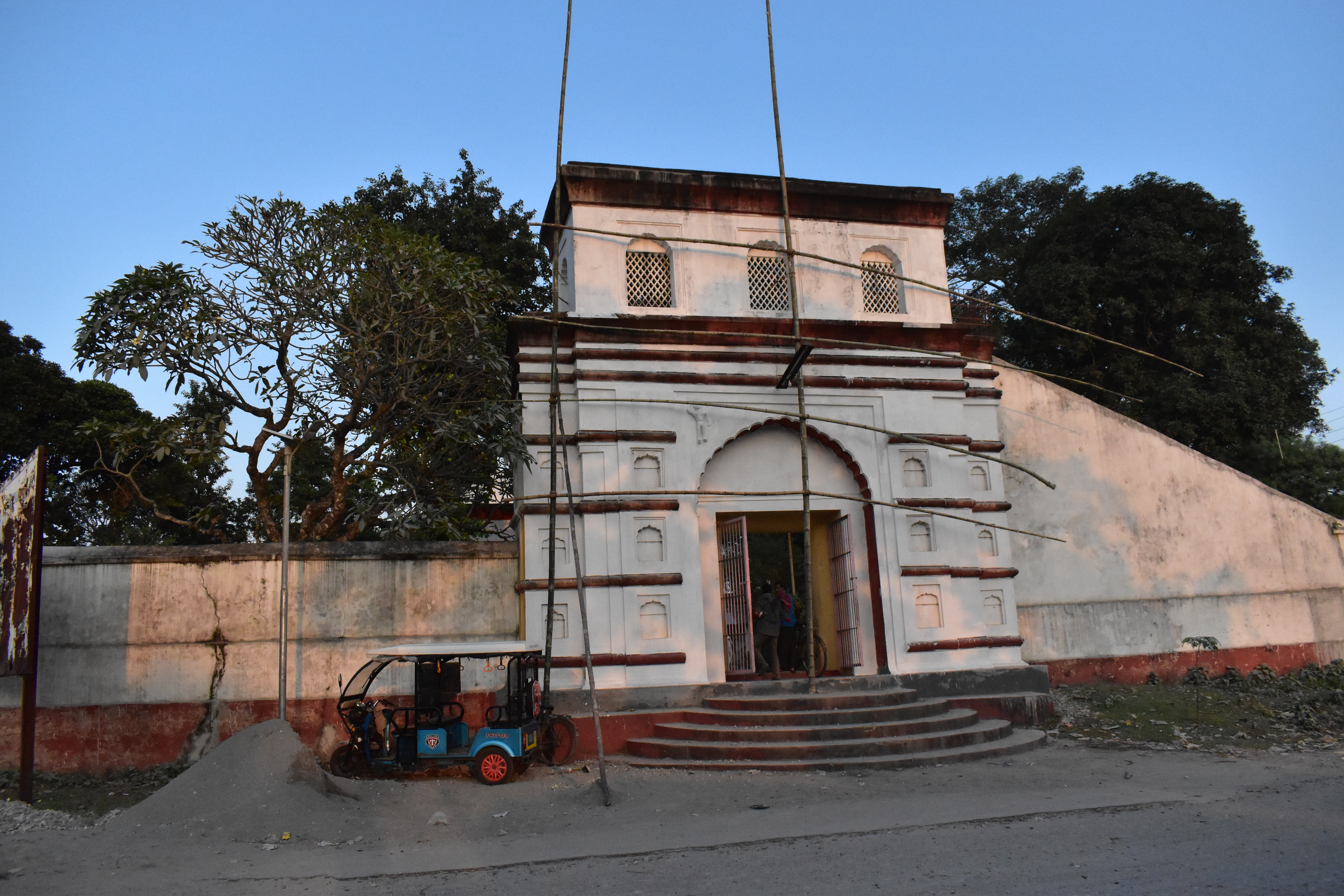
