= Raijmel =

Raijmel (Assamese: raij (people), mel (meeting)) is a people's meeting in Assam, an old political and social institution that originated in medieval times. The word raij is derived from rajya, which was originally an administrative or a fiscal unit in some parts of medieval Assam. Since these meetings could encompass more than one village, they were politically more potent than the village panchayat. Raijmels played an important role in peasant organization and uprisings in colonial Assam, especially during the uprisings at Phulaguri (1861),Rangia(1893–94), Lachima(1894) and Patharughat (1894). In present-day Assam, villagers continue to meet in raijmels.
