= Undivided Goalpara district =

Former district of Assam in British India

The Undivided Goalpara district is an erstwhile district of Assam, India, first constituted by the British rulers of Colonial Assam.

== Establishment ==
=== Historical background ===
The region was part of Kamarupa in the first millennium, subsequently a part of Kamata kingdom and finally Koch Hajo in the late 16th century. But after beginning of Ahom-Mughal conflicts (1619-1682), it became a part of the Bengal Subah of the Mughal Empire; though it was in Ahom control for about three years around 1658, it was not a regular part of Ahom territory. Under the Mughals, it was constituted as Sarkar Dhekuri, and it passed into East India Company control along with Bengal in 1765 and it fell under the Rangpur administration. As a part of the East India Company's frontier policy a special administrative region, called "North-Eastern Parts of Rangpur", was constituted sometime after 1816, with David David Scott appointed as its Civil Commissioner in January 1822.

=== Constituting Goalpara ===
In anticipation of a rapture with the Burmese, the eastern frontier was placed under a military command, with David Scott appointed as an Agent of the Governor-General to oversee the political aspect of the Northeast Frontier and the Assam affairs. Within the first month of the First Anglo-Burmese War (March 1824), the regions to the east of Rangpur, Kamrup and Darrang (under the erstwhile Ahom kingdom, then under Burmese occupation). By October 1824, the newly acquired region came under administrative control of David Scott, the Chief Commissioner of "North-Eastern Parts of Rangpur" and the historical grouping of the Goalpara, Kamrup and Darrang (largely congruous to the erstwhile Koch Hajo) called Western Assam (later Lower Assam) became apparent. The Burmese abandoned the Ahom capital Rangpur, Assam in 1825 and following the Treaty of Yandabo of February 1826, the whole of the Ahom kingdom, except the Sadiya and the Bengmara i.e the areas under Matak kingdom (1805–1839), fell under direct British control and came to be called Eastern Assam. Western and Eastern Assam were placed under two commissioners, the Senior and Junior Commissioners, with the Senior Commissioner having certain overriding powers over the Junior Commissioners. The Junior Commissionership was abolished in 1828.

In March 1833 the erstwhile "Northeast Rangpur" was constituted as the Goalpara district. At the end of the Bhutan War or (the Duar War) in 1865 the British took complete control of the Duars, and the portions adjoining Goalpara were added to it.

== Demography ==
#	District	Hindu Population	Hindu%	Muslim population	Muslim%	Total Population
1	Bongaigaon	359,145	48.61%	371,033	50.22%	738,804
2	Chirang	320,647	66.50%	109,248	22.66%	482,162
3	Dhubri	388,380	19.92%	1,553,023	79.67%	1,949,258
4	Goalpara	347,878	34.51%	579,929	57.52%	1,008,183
5	Kokrajhar	529,068	59.64%	252,271	28.44%	887,142
	Undivided Goalpara District (Total)	1,945,118	38.40%%	2,865,504	56.57%%	5,065,549

== See also ==
- Goalpara district
- Kamatapur Autonomous Council
