= Chakradhwaj of Kamata =

Chakradhwaj
- King
- Reign: 1460–1480
- Predecessor: Niladhwaj
- Successor: Nilambar
- Born: not known
- Died: 1480
- Dynasty: Khen dynasty

Chakradhwaj (reigned 1460–1480) was a Khen ruler of the Kamata kingdom in Assam. He was the son of the founder of the dynasty, Niladhwaj, and was succeeded by his son Nilambar.

Chakradhwaj of Kamata Khen dynasty
Preceded by Niladhwaj	King of Kamata; 1460-1480	Succeeded by Nilambar
