= Gosanimari =

- Village
- Location in West Bengal Location in India
- Coordinates: 26.032°N 89.484°E
- Country: India
- State: West Bengal
- District: Cooch Behar

Population (2011)
  - Total: 6,410
- Time zone: UTC+5:30 (IST)
- Vehicle registration: WB
- Lok Sabha constituency: Cooch Behar
- Vidhan Sabha constituency: Sitai
- Website: coochbehar.gov.in

Gosanimari (also known as Khalisa Gosanimari) is both a village and an archaeological site in Dinhata I CD block, in the Dinhata subdivision of the Cooch Behar district of West Bengal, north-eastern India. The name of this site was taken from the modern grampanchyat name of the Dinhata subdivision.

== Geography ==
Places in the Tufanganj and Dinhata subdivisions (except Sitai CD block) in Cooch Behar district
CT: census town, M: municipal town, R: rural/ urban centre, H: historical/ religious centre
Owing to space constraints in the small map, the actual locations in a larger map may vary slightly

=== Location ===
Gosanimari is located at 26.032°N 89.484°E.

=== Area overview ===
The map alongside shows the eastern part of the district. In Tufanganj subdivision 6.97% of the population lives in the urban areas and 93.02% lives in the rural areas. In Dinhata subdivision 5.98% of the population lives in the urban areas and 94.02% lives in the urban areas. The entire district forms the flat alluvial flood plains of mighty rivers.

Note: The map alongside presents some of the notable locations in the subdivisions. All places marked in the map are linked in the larger full screen map.

== Excavation ==
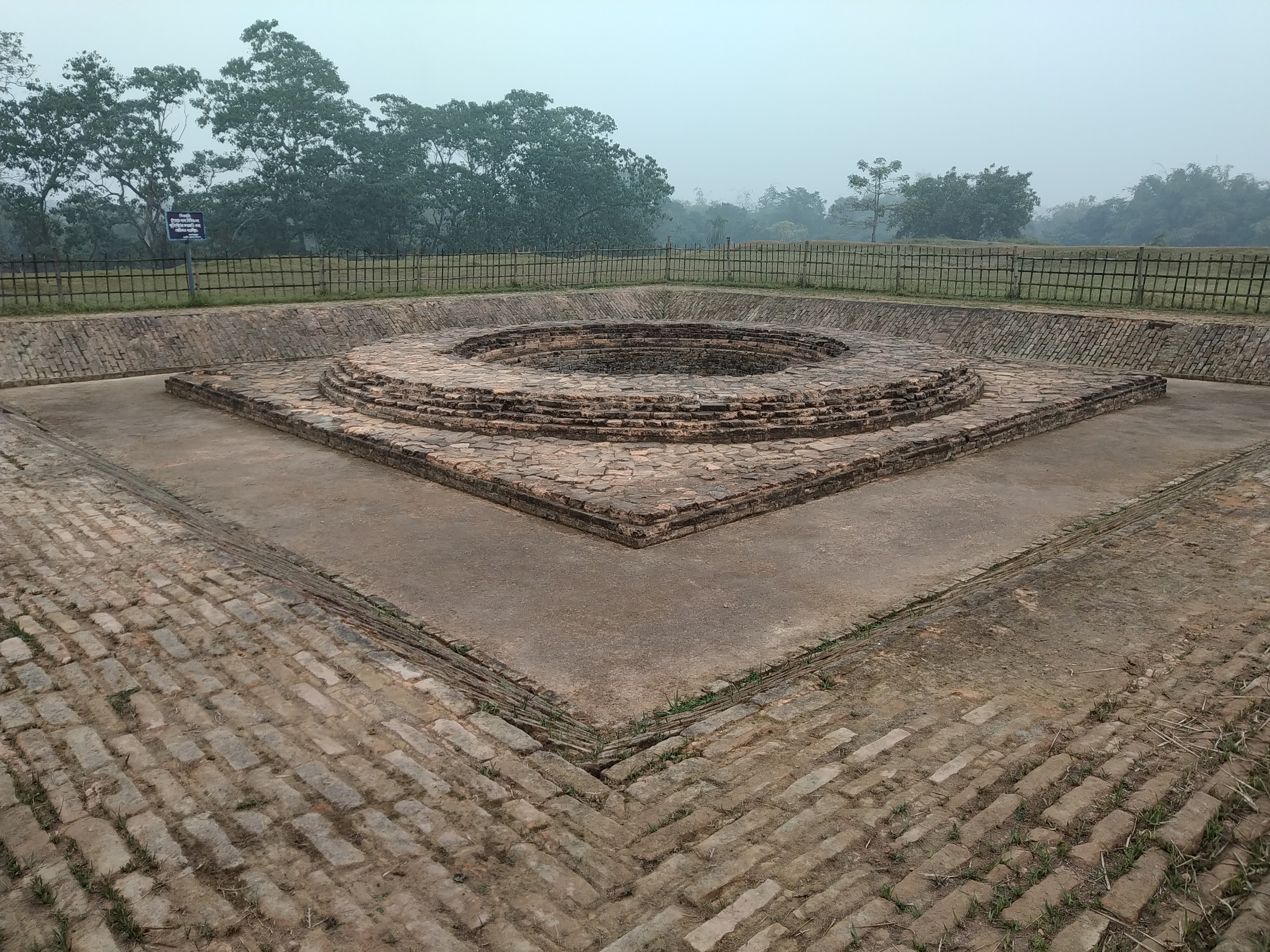
A fountain in the mound at Rajpat

=== Excavation Site ===
The site contains ruins of Rajpat which is speculated to have served as the capital of Kamata kingdom, although carbon dating of material from the fort as well as the stylistic dating of the sculptures shows that it was originally built in the 10th century during Pala Kamrupa rule.

=== Excavation history ===
Dr. Buchanan Hamilton in 1808 had left a vivid description along with a sketch of the mound and site which still hold good in authenticity. According to Dr. R.D. Banerjee, Kamata kingdom stood as buffer between western Kamrupa and the Bengal Sultanate in the 15th century CE. He is of the opinion that the Khens might have built Gosanimari, but it is also possible that these Mongoloid people only used the ruins of fortification which had been built several centuries earlier. After the independence Archaeological Survey of India took over the responsibility of this site.

=== Findings ===
It is believed parts of the ancient kingdoms important temples and buildings are now buried under a large grass grown mound. So far two large stone wells have been excavated, along with a large stone walls and a number of idols too. Pottery work includes vases, bowls, basin, dish, beaker etc. The facial and physiognomical delineation indicate the idols are the products of c. 11th and 12th century AD and influenced by Pala-Sena school of art. Carbon dating of material from the fort shows that it was originally built in the 10th century during Pala Kamrupa rule

== Rulers ==
In 1260, it became the seat of power of Kamata ruler Sandhya, who shifted his capital from Kamarupanagara (present-day North Guwahati) due to the frequent clashes he faced from the Kacharis from the south-east border in what is modern-day Assam. Later it was held by the Khen dynasty until 1498 AD, when Hussein Shah of Gaur unsurp power by defeating Nilambar of Kamata. From the early 16th century, it was ruled by the Koch dynasty founded by Biswa Singha.

When the English came along they Anglicized the term Koch to Cooch, hence the name Cooch Behar State.

== Culture ==
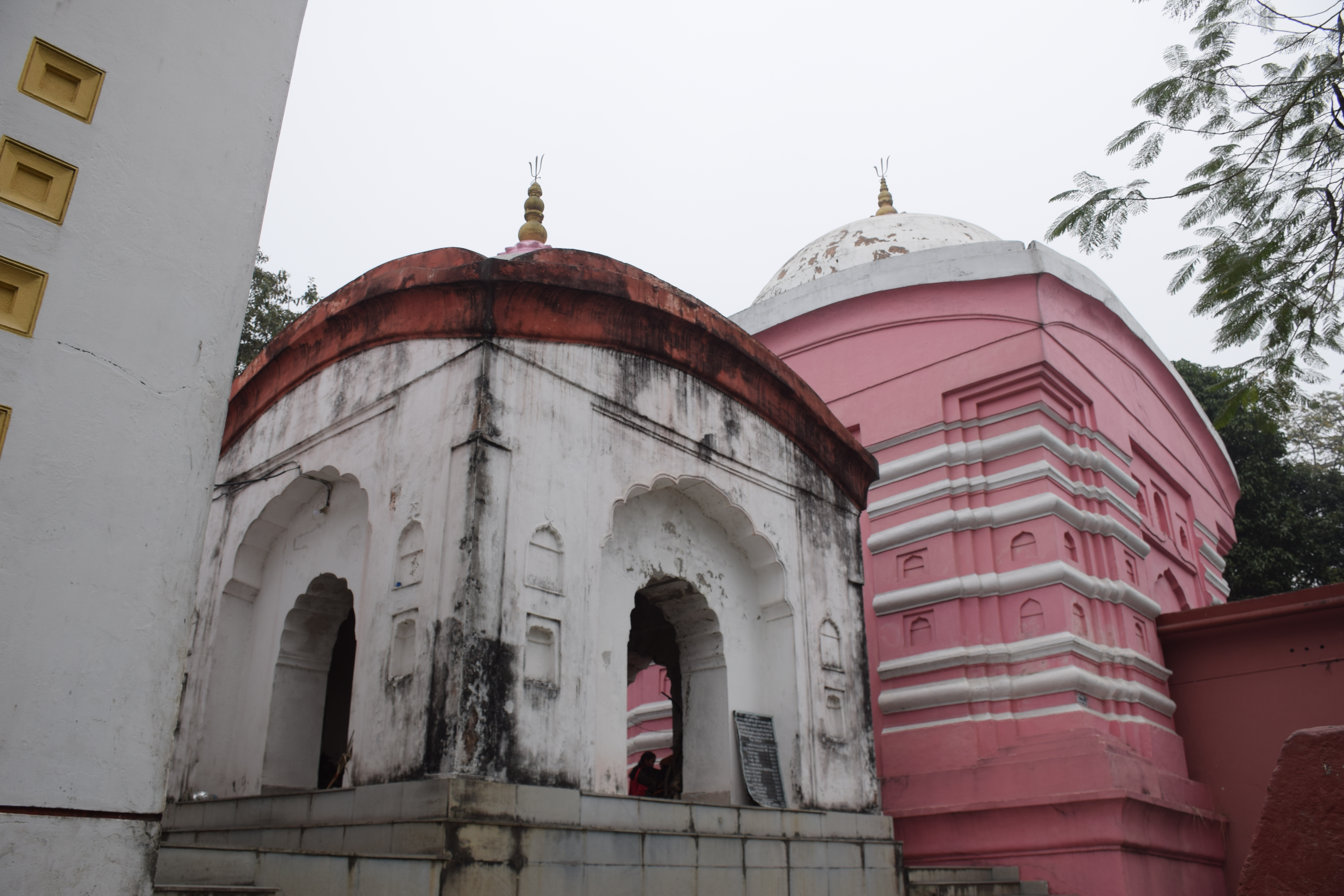
Kamteswari temple

The Kamteswari temple was built by Maharaja Pran Narayan in 1665.

== Demographics ==
As per the 2011 Census of India, Khalisa Gosanimari had a total population of 6,410. There were 3,295 (51%) males and 3,115 (49%) females. There were 788 persons in the age range of 0 to 6 years. The total number of literate people in Khalisa Gosanimari was 3,993 (71.02% of the population over 6 years).

== Healthcare ==
Gosanimari Block Primary Health Centre, with 30 beds at Gosanimari, is the major government medical facility in the Dinhata I CD block.
