= Kamata Kingdom =

Medieval Kingdom in Assam and nearby areas

- c. 1257–1587
- Capital: Kamarupanagara (present-day North Guwahati); Kamatapur (present-day Gosanimari)
- Common languages: Early Assamese (eastern part), Proto Kamta (western part)
- Religion: Hinduism
- Historical era: Late Medieval period
  - Established by Sandhya: c. 1257
  - Durlabh Narayan receives Candivara: unknown
  - Sasanka seizes power: unknown
  - Niladhwaj establishes Khen dynasty: unknown
  - Alauddin Hussain Shah defeats the last Khen ruler: 1498
  - Biswa Singha forms the Koch dynasty: 1515
  - Division of Koch dynasty into Koch Hajo and Koch Bihar: 1587
Preceded by	Succeeded by
Pala dynasty (Kamarupa)	Koch Bihar Bengal Sultanate; Koch Hajo
- Today part of: India (North Bengal, Lower Assam); Bangladesh

The Kamata Kingdom Assamese: কমতা ৰাজ্য, romanized: ˈkʌmətɑ; in the eastern Sivalik Hills, emerged in western Kamarupa probably when Sandhya, a ruler of Kamarupanagara, moved his capital west to Kamatapur sometime after 1257 CE. Since it originated in the old seat of the Kamarupa kingdom, and covered most of the western parts of it, the kingdom is also sometimes called as Kamarupa-Kamata.

It covered a region corresponding to present-day undivided districts of Kamrup, Goalpara, Jalpaiguri, and Cooch Behar district in India and Rangpur and northern parts of Mymensingh in Bangladesh. The rise of the Kamata kingdom marked the end of the ancient period in the history of Assam and the beginning of the medieval period. The last rulers were the Khens, who were later displaced in 1498 by Alauddin Hussain Shah, the ruler of the Bengal Sultanate. Though Hussain Shah developed extensive administrative structures, he lost political control to a confederation of Baro-Bhuyan within a few years.

In 1515, Biswa Singha removed the Baro-Bhuyan confederacy and established the Koch dynasty. The Koches were the last to call themselves Kamateshwar (the rulers of Kamata), but due to the far-reaching extensive influence and expansions the kingdom is sometimes called the Koch Kingdom. In the following century the kingdom split in Koch Bihar and Koch Hajo. The eastern kingdom, Koch Hajo, was absorbed into the Ahom kingdom in the 17th century. The western portion of the Kamata kingdom, Koch Bihar continued to be ruled by a branch of the Koch dynasty and later merged with the Indian territory after the independence of India from the British domain. The boundary between Koch Bihar and Koch Hajo is approximately the boundary between West Bengal and Assam today.

== Rulers of Kamata kingdom ==
The political history of the Kamata kingdom region prior to the rise of the Koch dynasty remains uncertain and is largely reconstructed from traditions and scattered sources. Historians have relied on limited epigraphic evidence alongside later literary works, genealogical traditions, and retrospective chronicles, resulting in reconstructions that remain tentative.

=== Early rulers ===
Sandhya, was a ruler of Kamarupanagara, the capital of the erstwhile Kamarupa. After withstanding an attack from Malik Ikhtiyaruddin Iuzbak in which Iuzbak was killed (1257) Sandhya moved his capital to Kamatapur, near present-day Cooch Behar town. Sandhya styled himself Kamateswara and the kingdom came to be known as Kamata.

==== List of early Kamata rulers ====
- Sandhya
- Sindhu Rai
- Rup Narayan
- Singhadhwa

=== Middle rulers ===
Pratapdhvaj was a minister of Singhadhvaj when he usurped power. At his death, his cousin Dharmanarayan seized power. He was challenged by Pratapdhvaj's son Durlabhnarayan and they decided to settle. Durlabhnarayan assumed power Kamrup, Goalpara, Jalpaiguri, Koch Bihar, along with the capital Kamatapur, while Dharmanarayan retained Rangpur and Mymensingh. As part of the settlement, Durlabhnarayan received from Dharmanarayan the custody of fourteen families of Brahmans and Kayasthas, one among whom was Candivara, the great-great-grandfather of Sankardev. The court poets of Durlabhnarayan (Hema Saraswati and Harivara Vipra) and Indranarayan produced literary works that are considered to be the first examples of Early Assamese.

Separately, an epigraphic record, from 1428, of a king named Durlabhnarayan (mentioned as son of Dharmanarayan), found in Sadiya-Chepakhowa, mentions that his grandfather Ratnanarayana (identified with Satyanarayana from late 14th century), after defeating the enemies of Kamdeva, became the king of Kamatapura which might indicate that the eastern region of Sadhaya was politically connected to the western region of Kamata.

==== List of middle Kamata rulers ====
- Pratapdhvaj
- Dharma Narayan
- Durlabh Narayan
- Indra Narayan

=== Baro-Bhuyan rule ===
The invasion of Assam by Sikandar Shah (1357–1390) weakened Indranarayan. Though Sikander Shah had to retreat from central Assam because of an attack on Bengal by Firuz Shah Tughlaq, Indranarayana was sufficiently damaged that a Bhuyan from Darrang, Arimatta, was able to usurp power.

- Sasanka (Arimatta)
- Gajanka
- Sukranka
- Mriganka Jungal Balahu

=== Khen dynasty ===
The Khen dynasty, of Kheng-Bhutanese origin, replaced the weak rulers of Kamata kingdom following Arimatta in the middle of the 15th century. Niladhvaj Khen, the first king, united several Baro-Bhuyan chieftains of the area and removed the last of Arimatta's successors—Mriganka. There were only three Khen rulers:

- Niladhwaj
- Chakradhwaj
- Nilambar (c. 1498)

The last king, Nilambar expanded the kingdom to include the present Koch Bihar districts of West Bengal and the undivided Kamrup and Darrang districts of Assam and northern Mymensingh in Bangladesh as well as eastern parts of Dinajpur district, though he was removed by Alauddin Husain Shah in 1498.

=== Bengal Sultanate rule ===
Alauddin Hussain Shah, a Sultan of Bengal, removed the last Khen ruler in 1498. This followed a long siege that likely started in 1493 soon after Alauddin's ascension and ended in a treacherous win with 24,000 infantry, cavalry and a war flotilla. Alauddin destroyed the city and eventually annexed the region up to Hajo by 1502, removed the local chieftains, and established military control over the region. He established his son Shahzada Danyal as an administrator and issued coins in his own name as the "conqueror of Kamru and Kamata ...". This rule was short since the Baro-Bhuyans rose up in revolt soon after and exterminated Sultanate rule.

- Danyal (1498-????)

Nevertheless, the Muslim rule had lasting effects. Hussein Shah's coins continued to be used till 1518, when the Koch dynasty began consolidating their rule. Ghiasuddin Aulia, a Muslim divine figure from Mecca, established a colony at Hajo. His tomb, which is said to contain a little soil from Mecca, now called "Poa Mecca" ("a quarter Mecca"), is frequented by Hindus and Muslims alike.

=== Baro-Bhuyan Interregnum ===
Alauddin Hussain Shah's representative in Kamata, his son Shahzada Danyal and his officers, was seized and killed by the Baro-Bhuyans of the region and the region lapsed into their confederated style of governance till the Koches took over. Though it is not known when the Baro-Bhuyan rule began, historians estimate that Biswa Singha's campaign against the Baro-Bhuyans began in 1509.

=== Koch kingdom ===
- Biswa Singha (1515–1540)
- Nara Narayan (1540–1587)

The Kamata kingdom then passed into the hands of the Koch dynasty, with Biswa Singha consolidating his control over the Bara-Bhuyans one after another and establishing the Koch dynasty with its dominion from the Karatoya River in the west to the Barnadi river in the east. In the 1581 Raghudev, the son of Chilarai and the nephew of Nara Narayan, affected a split in the kingdom—Koch Hajo and Koch Bihar. Though Raghudev had accepted the suzerainty of his uncle, the two parts of the original Kamata kingdom split for good in 1587 when Naranarayan died, the boundary between them forming roughly the administrative boundary between the present-day Assam and West Bengal.

Koch Hajo, the eastern kingdom, soon came under attack from the Mughal, and the region went back and forth for between the Mughal and the Ahoms, finally settling with the Ahoms. Koch Bihar, the western kingdom, first befriended the Mughals and then the British, and the rulers maintained the princely state till the end of the British rule.

==== Administration system ====
Yuvaraj: Biswa Singha appointed his brother Sisu as the Yuvaraj. The descendant of Sisu became the Raikat kings of Jalpaiguri.

Karjis/Karzis: Biswa Singha appointed twelve minister from his tribesman to form a Karjee, this position was hereditary. Two important Karjee and Yuvaraj form a cabinet.

Senapati: Commander of a standing army.

==== Paik System ====
Paik: Individual male

- Thakuria: in charge of over 20 paiks.
- Saikia: in charge of over 100 paiks.
- Hazari: in charge of over 1000 paiks.
- Omra: in charge of over 3000 paiks.
- Nawab: in charge of over 66,000 paiks.

== See also ==
- Koch–Ahom conflicts
- Bengal Sultanate-Kamata Kingdom war
