= Phulaguri Uprising =

Agrarian uprising against the British Raj

Phulaguri Dhawa
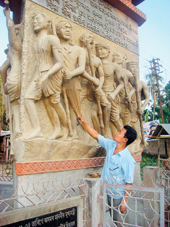
- The Phulaguri Dhawa memorial
Date	October 1861
Location	Phulaguri, Assam
Result	Uprising suppressed

Belligerents
(British Empire) British Raj	Phulaguri farmers and fishermen

Commanders and leaders
Lieutenant G B Singer; Major Henry Hopkinson; Major Campbell	

Casualties and losses
3	54

The Phulaguri Uprising (also Phulaguri Dhawa/Dhewa) was an agrarian uprising in Phulaguri village in the Brahmaputra Valley, in October 1861 against the new income and farm taxation policies of the British Indian Empire following the Indian Rebellion of 1857. The murders of Lieutenant G B Singer and two police constables on 18 October 1861 led to mass reprisals in which at least 54 Assamese farmers were killed.

== Background ==
The British Raj was charged all of the expenses the East India Company and the British Crown supposedly bore to suppress the Indian Rebellion of 1857. The British Crown also sought to recover all of the compensation paid to the shareholders of the East India Company when it ceded all Indian territory to the crown.

The income and licence taxes imposed on Indian citizens as a result caused hardships in the Brahmaputra Valley too, where crops, fisheries, fodder, timber and trees on which silkworms feed were all taxed. A ban in 1860 on poppy cultivation made matters worse. The British had earlier encouraged poppy cultivation, to help them export opium to China. After the Opium Wars ended with the Treaty of Tientsin they no longer had a market for it. The British move to taxation of betel leaf and areca nut farming was the final spark for the farmer revolt.

== Uprising ==
The situation became especially tense in Nowgong, whose deputy commissioner at the time, Lieutenant Herbert Sconce, dealt peremptorily with mass protests outside his office. A large group of farmers had marched on 17 September 1861 to petition him for redressal of their tax grievances. He refused to meet with them, so 15-20 of them burst into his chamber, and were arrested.

The farmers returned on 9 October 1861 for another demonstration. Rather than meeting them, Sconce again dismissed them with vague reassurances that there were no plans to tax betel farms. Unable to make headway through discussions with the British bureaucracy, the farmers organised a meeting of their own, called raijmel (people's assembly), in which they conducted long debates culminating in a consensus on the next steps that was binding on all participants.

When Sconce heard of the raijmel, he sent a police force to arrest the organising leaders. On 15 October 1861, a police force of five arrived in Phulaguri to find one thousand locals amassed in the assembly. They refused to disperse and instead forced the police to retreat.

Sconce ordered reinforcements to the area, and 13 additional policemen, including the Nowgong Daroga, arrived in Phulaguri on 16 October 1861. Farmers were still travelling to join the raijmel, and the participants swelled to three or four thousand, a few hundred being armed with lathis. Sconce sent another police party to assist the Daroga.

On 17 October 1861, the police were unable to persuade the meeting to dissolve, despite assuring their leaders that they'd get an audience with Sconce. The daroga reported its inability to make headway, and Sconce responded by sending Lieut G B Singer, Assistant Commissioner in Nowgong, with 20 more policemen. Singer arrived in Phulaguri on the 18th, and found the meeting in progress again. He discussed the situation with their spokesman, Jati Kalita, telling him that the meeting was illegal, and the farmers could write a petition to the authorities on their issues. He asked the crowd to disarm and disperse.

Singer ordered the policemen to begin collecting the lathis and he attempted to snatch some from the protestors himself. In the ensuing melee, Singer tried to disarm a farmer called Mora Singh, when a fisherman, Babu Doom, struck him on the head with a lathi. Other policemen were also beaten; they fled, leaving Singer defenceless. The lieutenant was beaten again and thrown into the Kolong river.

Sconce learnt of the disaster in the evening, and fearing a full-scale assault on Nowgong, split the remaining police force in the town into two halves, one sent to Phulaguri to retrieve Singer's body and the other to protect the Nowgong treasury. On 19 October 1861, the police force that reached Phulaguri fired on the farmers when they attacked it.

== Battle ==
Fortuitously for the British, Major Henry Hopkinson, the agent of the North East Frontier Governor General and Assam Commissioner, was in Tezpur, on board a steamer. Learning of the uprising on 19 October, Hopkinson requisitioned the steamer and with the help of fellow-passenger Major Campbell, recruited a force from the 2nd Assam Light Infantry to leave immediately for Nowgong. Hopkinson himself sailed to Gauhati, obtained reinforcements under a Captain Chambers, and reached Nowgong on 23 October 1861.

Meanwhile Campbell's force had already been attacked by the Phulaguri farmers. On 24th, Sconce and Campbell arrived in Phulaguri and in the ensuing battle on the banks of the Kolong, killed 39 farmers with another 15 succumbing to their injuries later. 141 farmers from Phulaguri and the neighbouring regions were imprisoned in temporary jails built out of bamboo poles. The armed forces garrisoned at Phulaguri for six months and forced the residents to provide for their food and shelter.

== Aftermath ==
Lakshman Singh Deka, Sangbar Lalung and Rangbar Deka were executed in Nowgong for their alleged roles in Singer's murder. Six others – Rupsing Lalung, Sibsing Lalung, Narsing Lalung, Hebera Lalung, Babu Doom Kaibarta and Banamali Kaibarta – were sentenced by the Calcutta High Court to transportation for life, two banished for 14 years and one was to undergo rigorous imprisonment for 7 years.

Sconce was criticised for his handling of the situation, demoted to Assistant Commissioner and transferred to Kamrup district.
