= Sandhya (ruler of Kamarupa) =

First ruler of Kamata Kingdom

- Gaudeshwar (Victor/Lord of Gaur)

1st King of Kamatapura
- Reign: 1228 – 1260 CE
- Predecessor: unknown
- Religion: Hinduism

Gaudeshwar Raja Sandhya was the ruler of Kamarupa in north-eastern India in the present-day state of Assam. He founded the Kamata Kingdom when he moved his capital west to Kamatapur (present-day Gosanimari) sometime after 1257 CE.

== Accession ==
He ascended the throne of Kamarupa in 1228 as a vassal of the Delhi Sultanate, when Nasiruddin Mahmud, the eldest son of Sultan Shamsuddin Iltutmish, had killed his predecessor in 1228 AD. However, after Nasiruddin Mahmud withdrew from Kamrup, Sandhya stopped paying tribute and declared independence.

== War with Lakhnauti ==
In 1229, after the death of Nasiruddin, Sandhya drove the Muslims out of his territory and captured territory until Karatoya River. After that, to avenge the previous defeats, he invaded the western border of Gaur (Lakhnauti) and annexed regions across the Karatoya into his kingdom. In retaliation, Malik Ikhtiyaruddin Yuzbak the governor of Bengal under Delhi Sultanate attempted an invasion on Sandhya's domain in 1257. However, Sandhya resisted the invasion, captured and executed Malik Ikhtiyaruddin Yuzbak.

== Establishment of the Kamata Kingdom ==
After this attack, Sandhya moved his capital from Kamarupanagara (present-day North Guwahati) to Kamatapur in present-day Cooch Behar district. He established a new kingdom called the Kamata Kingdom.

== See also ==
Yuzbak Khan's invasion of Kamarupa
