= Jungal Balahu =

Tiwa King of Kamata kingdom in Assan, Northeast India

Jungal Balahu was a legendary king in medieval Assam. The kingdom was in present-day Raha, Assam ruled by members of his dynasty. A statue of Jungal Balahu is erected in Jungal Balahu Garh. It is a tourist destination,

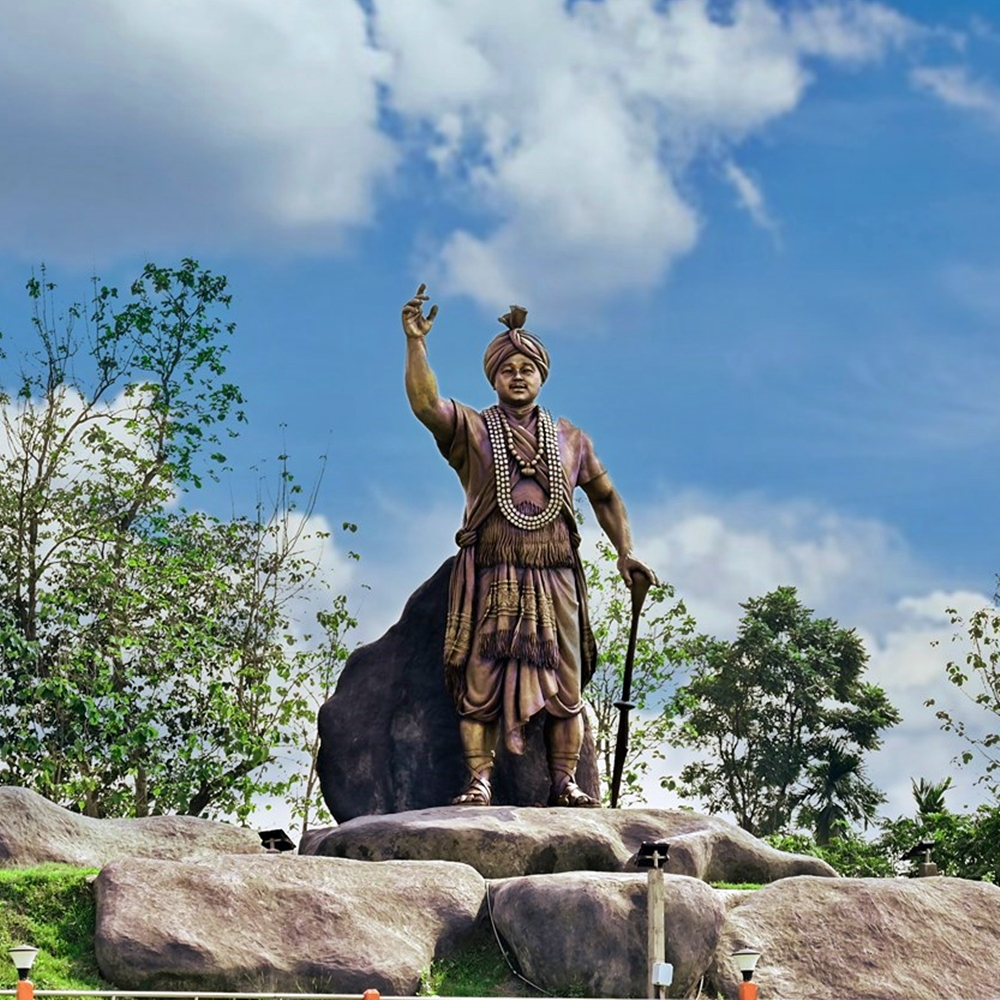
Jungal Balahu statue near Raha, Assam

== Early life ==
Balahu, also known as Mriganka in 1415-1440, was son of Gangawati and the legendary ruler Arimatta.

There are many legends about Arimatta. He is said to be the son of Chandraprabha/Khonchari and Pratap Singha/Mayamatta. This is described in Deo Langkhui.

== Last Kamata Kingdom ruler ==
Balahu died of drowning in the Kolong River where he was taking a bath. His wife Xukomola was the daughter of Naga king Fa Badchah. She conspired with her father and hid the divine sword of Balahu that made him invincible. He defeated all nearby kingdoms.

== Notes ==
- Narasimha and Emenyouin : African Literature Comes of Age, 1988, p 1-3
- Richard M Dorson : Folklore and Folklife, 1972, p-2
- Padmanath Gohain Barua : Assam Buranji Buranji
- Pratap Chandra Choudhury: History of Civilization of the people of Assam to the 12th century AD, p26
- Dharma Singh Deka : Rahar Regoni, Jyotirekha Nagaon, 1980
- Maneswar Dewri : Tiwa Janajati aru Bhasar Itihas, Tribal Research Institute, Guwahati, Assam, 1991
