= Nilambar =

Last ruler of the Kamata Kingdom In Assam

- Kāmateshwar
- Reign: 1480–1498
- Predecessor: Chakradhwaj
- Successor: Alauddin Husain Shah
- Died: c. 1498
- Dynasty: Khen dynasty
- Religion: Hindu

Nilambar or Nīlambara (reigned 1480–1498) was the last Khen ruler or Kamadeswar of the Kamata kingdom in Western Assam and North Bengal. He ruled from the city of Kamatapur (now called Gosanimari).

== Rule ==
Nilambar was the son of Chakradhwaj (1460–1480) and assumed the throne on the death of his father. He was a successful warrior and is regarded as the most powerful king of his lineage. He expanded the kingdom to include the present districts of Cooch Behar in West Bengal and northern Mymensingh in Bangladesh. He also conquered the Undivided Kamrup and Darrang districts of Assam and the eastern parts of Dinajpur.

Nilambar was interested in communication across the kingdom and invested in a road building program. One of the roads later formed part of the trunk route between Cooch Behar, Rangpur and Bogra.

== Defeat ==
Nilambar was defeated by the Sultan of Bengal, Alauddin Husain Shah, in 1498. Husain Shah invaded the Kamata kingdom with 24,000 infantry, cavalry and a war flotilla, defeated the Kamata forces and captured Kamatapur after a long siege. In the traditional account, the invasion was instigated by Sachipatra, a disgruntled Brahmin minister whose son had been killed by the king for licentious behavior. It is said that he escaped the battlefield alive and was never heard of again.

== Cultural references ==
The fall of Nilambar is the subject of an epic poem written by Hitesvar Barbaruva. It is regarded as the most powerful and easy-flowing blank verse in Assamese.

Nilambar Khen dynasty
Preceded by Chakradhwaj	King of Kamata; 1480-1498	Succeeded by Alauddin Husain Shah
