= Khen dynasty =

Medieval Hindu dynasty of Assam (India)

Khen dynasty Khen dynasty
- unknown–1498 CE
- Capital: Kamatapur (present-day Gosanimari)
- Common languages: Assamese
- Religion: Hinduism
- Government: Monarchy
- Maharaja
  - unknown: Niladhwaj
  - unknown: Chakradhwaj
  - unknown – c. 1498: Nilambar
- Historical era: Medieval India
  - Established: unknown
  - Disestablished: 1498 CE
Preceded by	Succeeded by
Kamata Kingdom#Baro-Bhuyan rule	Koch dynasty

The Khen dynasty (also Khyen dynasty) of Assam was a late medieval dynasty of the erstwhile Kamata kingdom. After the fall of the Pala dynasty of Kamrupa, the western region was reorganized into the Kamata kingdom when Sandhya moved his capital from Kamarupanagara to Kamatapur in about 1257 due to mounting dangers from the east and the west. Sandhya styled himself Kamateswara and the kingdom came to be known as "Kamata". The Khen dynasty at a later period took control of the kingdom.

== Origin ==
According to Gosani Mangala (1823), the Khen rulers had a humble origin, implying that they were probably local chieftains who rose to power after the fall of the Palas. Ethnically, the Khen rulers belonged to a Tibeto-Burman ethnolinguistic group. The ethnicity of Khen is not known precisely but may have been associated with Khyen of the Indo-Burmese border or Kheng from the mountains.

Though there is no contemporary historical evidence, some data from eighteenth-century's Gosanimangal claim that a boy named Kanta Nath became the Khen ruler Niladwaj, who hailed from a poor family in Taluk Jambari on the bank of Singimari. Other sources claim Kanta Nath to be a migrant from Tripura. They worshipped Kamatashwari (also called Chandi or Bhavani), thus providing a break from the earlier dynasties that drew their lineage from Narakasura, the son of Vishnu.

== Fall ==
In 1492–93 CE, Shamsuddin Muzaffar Shah of Bengal invaded and conquered at least parts of the Kamata kingdom, and subsequently issued coins bearing the title Kamata Mardan. The kingdom of Kamatapura finally fell to Alauddin Husain Shah in 1498. But Hussein Shah could not rule the kingdom— Bhuyan chiefs of the region defeated the invaders in 1505. Soon, control of the Kamata kingdom passed into the hands of the Koch dynasty.

== Rulers ==
- Niladhwaj
- Chakradhwaj
- Nilambar

== See also ==
- Kamarupa
- Kamata Kingdom
- History of Assam
- Ahom–Mughal conflicts
- List of rulers of Assam
- List of Hindu Empires and Dynasties
