= Bhardhora Borphukan =

Borbarua of the Ahom Kingdom (service year 1679-80)

Phu kon Lung Bhardhora Borphukan Bhatdhora Borphukan

Borphukan of the Ahom Kingdom
- In office 1677–1680
- Monarchs: Sudoiphaa; Sulikphaa
- Preceded by: Laluksola Borphukan
- Succeeded by: Bandar Borphukan

Personal details
- Born: Lan Ron Kop Ahom Kingdom
- Died: 1680
- Children: Madho
- Parent: Momai Tamuli Borbarua (father)
- Relatives: Lachit Borphukan (brother); Laluksola Borphukan (brother); Marangi Borbarua (brother); Lao Deka (brother); Datukari (brother); Pakhori Gabharu (sister); Ramani Gabharu (niece)

Bhardhora Borphukan (died 1680), also Bhatdhora Borphukan was the son of famous Ahom noble and statesman Momai Tamuli Borbarua, and also known as the brother of Ahom General Lachit Barphukan and Laluksola Borphukan. He was posted as Borphukan at Kaliabor after his brother Laluk Sola Borphukan hand over the control of Guwahati to Muhammad Azam Shah.
