= Marangi Borbarua =

Borbarua of the Ahom Kingdom (service year 1679-80)

Phu ke Lung Marangi Bobarua

Borbarua of the Ahom Kingdom
- In office First term (1674-74) – Second term (1677-80)
- Monarchs: Sujinphaa aka Shura Singha; Sudoiphaa Parbatia Roja; Sulikphaa aka Ratnadhwaja Singha (Lora Roja)
- Preceded by: Lasai Debera Borbarua
- Succeeded by: Kirkiria Borbarua; Dihingia Alun Borbarua

Personal details
- Born: Lan Bolik aka Lan Bolin; 1624 CE Garhgaon, Ahom Kingdom
- Died: 15th November, 1685 CE
- Children: Moloka; Nasao; Sopa; Abhakatia
- Parent: Momai Tamuli Borbarua (father)
- Relatives: Laluksola Borphukan (brother); Lachit Borphukan (brother); Bhardhora Borphukan (brother); Lao Deka (brother); Datukari (brother); Pakhori Gabharu (sister); Ramani Gabharu (niece); Baduli Borphukan (uncle)

Marangi Borbarua (1624–1685) aka Marangial Borboruah was the son of Ahom noble and statesman Momai Tamuli Borbarua. He was the brother of Ahom General Lachit Barphukan and Laluksola Borphukan He was posted as Marangikhowa gohain, governor of the Marangi province in the Ahom kingdom during the time of the Battle of Saraighat. Later he was posted as Borbarua at the time of Ahom king Sudoiphaa and Sulikphaa. He had set up his office of the Barbaruah in Marangial, Deberapar.

Haribar, was a descendant of Marangi Borbarua and an associate of Gomdhar Konwar, the leader of the first independence uprising of Assam in 1826-28. He was near the Marangial Namghar in Toratoli Deberapar and was in charge of a thousand soldiers of the Morangial Naga hills Fort. The first battle between the Assamese freedom fighters and the British soldiers took place on 30 October 1828 at the house of Haribar near the oldest Namghar in the village of Marangial in Deberapar.

== Sources ==
- Barbaruah, Hiteswar (1981). Ahomor Din (in Assamese). Guwahati: Publication Board of Assam.
- Barua, Harakanta (1930). S K Bhuyan (ed.). Āsāma burañjī, or a history of Assam, from the commencement of the Ahom rule to the British occupation of Assam in 1826 A.D., being an enlarged version of the chronicle of Kasinath Tamuli-Phukan. Department of Historical and Antiquarian Studies (DHAS).
- Bhuyan, S K, ed. (1968). Tunkhungia Buranji (2 ed.). Guwahati: Lawyers Book Stall.
- Gait, Edward A (1926), A History of Assam (2 ed.), Calcutta
- Gogoi, Padmeswar (1968). The Tai and the Tai Kingdoms. Guwahati: Department of Publications, Gauhati University.
