= Mir Jumla's invasion of Assam =

Mughal-Ahom war (1662-1663)

Invasion of the Ahom Kingdom
- Part of the Ahom–Mughal conflicts
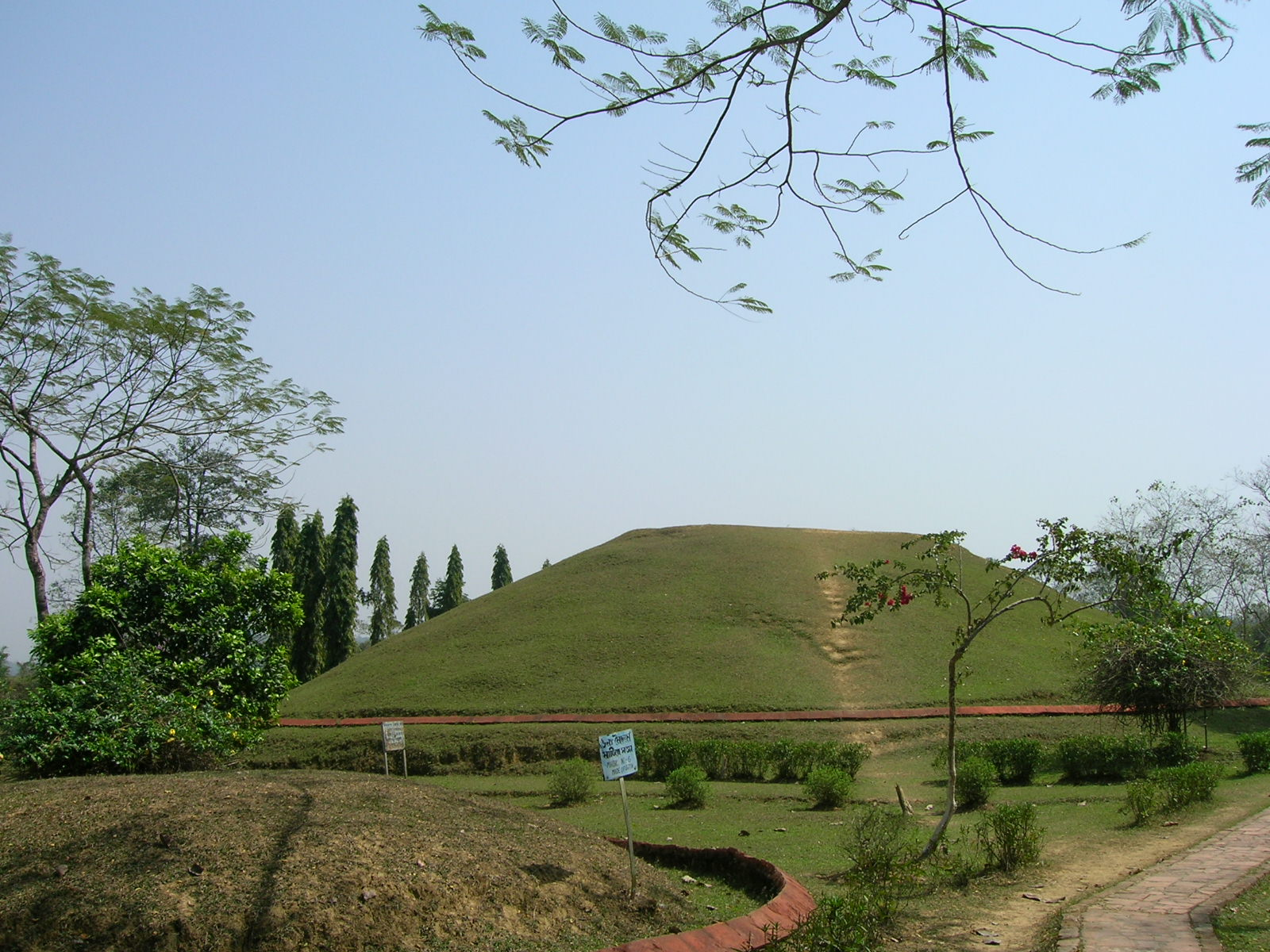
- According to spoken accounts, approximately 10 Moidams were damaged by Mir Jumla II's army.
Date	4 January 1662 – 23 January 1663 (1 year, 2 weeks and 5 days)
Location	Brahmaputra Valley, Ahom Kingdom
Result	See § Aftermath

Belligerents
Mughal Empire; Bengal Subah; Awadh Subah	Ahom kingdom

Commanders and leaders
Mir Jumla; Diler Khan	Sutamla

Strength
30,000 cavalry 12,000 infantry 323 war boats	--

Mir Jumla's invasion of Assam, between 4 January 1662 and January 1663, was the most intrusive of all Mughal invasions of the Ahom Kingdom in the 17th century. Led by Mir Jumla II, the subahdar of Bengal during the reign of Aurangzeb, the Mughals managed to occupy the Ahom capital of Garhgaon. Nevertheless, the distressed Mughal forces barely managed to return with a face-saving treaty. The Ahoms agreed to a vassal status with a tributary arrangement akin to the ones the Mughal Empire had with the Rajputs; but Mir Jumla died en route to Dhaka, and the Ahoms pushed the Mughal garrisons out of Assam within four years—when Ahom forces took control up to the Manas river in December 1667.

== Background ==
The Kamata kingdom under the Koch dynasty split in 1581 into Koch Bihar, which lay to the west of the Sankosh River and Koch Hajo, which lay between the Sankosh in the west and the Kameng River in the east—starting a bitter rivalry between two branches of the dynasty. Meanwhile, the Mughals were able to bring Bengal under some semblance of authority by 1583, though it was still being challenged by the Baro-Bhuyan of Bengal led by Isa Khan. The rivalry and conflicts between the two Koch domains continued to be hot driving Koch Bihar into Mughal vassalage and Koch Hajo to align first with Isa Khan, and when that disappeared, with the Ahoms. Eventually the Mughals under Islam Khan marched against Koch Hajo, removed Parikshit Narayan, the then ruler, and took control of his territory in 1613, bringing them into direct confrontation with the Ahoms. At this point the Koch Hajo region (or called Kamrup) ended up not with the Koch Bihar ruler but with the Mughals—and nearly took over complete control of Koch Bihar itself.

The Mughals called the newly acquired territory Villayat Koch Hajo and established four sarkars: (1) Kamrup, (2) Dhekuri, (3) Dakhinkul, and (4) Bangalbhum. The local peasants, till then under the Paik system and now without a local ruler, revolted against the Mughal system imposed on them, and gained some recognition under a peasant leader called Sanatan.

=== Struggle for Kamrup ===
The Mughals now cast its imperial eye on the riches of the entire Brahmaputra valley and planned to take over the Ahom kingdom next. But the first expedition under the command of Aba Baqr in 1615 was unsuccessful, with the Ahoms routing the Mughals at the Battle of Samdhara (1616).

The Ahoms then started a proxy war (1616–1620) against the Mughals in Kamrup but when it failed to drive them out they changed course to prepare for a more direct campaign. The campaign, which began in March 1636 primarily under Bali Narayan, a scion of the Koch dynasty and the ruler of Darrang under the Ahoms, ended in December of the same year with the Ahoms gaining possession of most of Kamrup. This was followed immediately by a Mughal counter-campaign in December 1637 under Mir Zeiuddin and Allah Yar Khan—and by April 1638 they defeated Bali Narayan at Barpeta, recovered Hajo, defeated the Ahoms at Kajali and then began planning to take the Ahom kingdom itself. In this second attempt into the Ahom kingdom, the Mughals were aided by the ruler of Koch Bihar, Pran Narayan, but in the final battle at Duimunisila, the combined Mughal and Koch forces were defeated and this ended with the Treaty of Asurar Ali, signed between Allah Yar Khan and Momai Tamuli Borborua, which fixed the Ahom-Mughal border at the Bornadi River, the original eastern boundary of Koch Hajo. Allah Yar Khan was appointed the faujdar at Hajo, and though there were disputes, they were settled diplomatically by Allah Yar Khan on the Mughal side and Momai Tamuli Borborua on the Ahom side.

=== Ahoms take old Koch Hajo ===
After Shah Jahan fell sick in 1657 Shah Shuja, the Bengal Subahdar and a claimant to the Mughal throne, left Bengal with his entire army and naval forces to participate in the war of succession leaving Sarkar Kamrup exposed. Pran Narayan, the ruler of Koch Bihar and a Mughal vassal, declared independence and moved to occupy Kamrup. His minister-general, Bhavnath Karji, came from the west and encamped at Hajo oppressing ryots and Muslim women. The Ahoms, led by Borbarua Tangsu Handikoi advanced from the east. Squeezed between the two advancing forces, the Koch from the west and the Ahoms from the east, Mir Lutfullah Shiraji, the then faujdar at Guwahati, fled to Jahangirnagar in early 1659, bringing the Koch and the Ahoms face to face. The Koch proposed a division of Kamrup but the Ahoms refused. The Ahoms then advanced against the Koch under the command of three Phukans up to the Sankosh in the west and south up to Hatshila, thus occupying the old Koch Hajo territory of Parikshit Narayan.

The Ahoms then evacuated the Mughal population in the newly occupied region to the Ahom kingdom, and installed a scion of the Koch dynasty who promised to bring a rapprochement between the Ahoms and the Koch powers as the king of the newly acquired territories.

== Prelude to invasion ==
Aurangzeb rewarded Mir Jumla for his service in the Battle of Khajwa, which Aurangzeb won against Shuja; and when Shuja began his retreat to Bengal Aurangzeb charged Mir Jumla with his pursuit. At Tanda Shuja took his last stand and then escaped to the Arakan—when Aurangzeb received this news he appointed Mir Jumla the Subahdar of Bengal in June 1660—in his farman Aurangzeb wanted Mir Jumla to conquer Assam and Arakan after settling the administration in Bengal. Mir Jumla is said to have persuaded Aurangzeb to conquer Assam first to use as a base in future campaigns against Burma (Myanmar) and China. According to Sarkar, Mir Jumla was motivated both by imperialist design as well as Islamic zeal.

The Koch and Ahom rulers immediately sought peace—but Mir Jumla understood that it was a ruse to buy time to prepare for war. In 1661 Mir Jumla sent Raja Sujan Singh against the Koch and Rashind Khan against the Ahoms; but neither of them could move far. Sujan Singh's advance stopped at Ekduar due to the rainy season.

When Rashid Khan advanced against the Ahoms their forward commanders abandoned Hatishala and Baritala and retreated to the Manas river. Rashid Khan, fearing a snare, halted at Rangamati for reinforcements from Mir Jumla. At his camp he received an Ahom envoy inquiring him why he is attacking the Ahoms, which he sent to Mir Jumla. Mir Jumla let the envoys know that he would not invade the Ahom kingdom if the Ahom king handed over Kamrup, a daughter with a suitable tribute, and if it refrained from further aggression. Though Mir Jumla did not receive a reply then, he did receive the Ahom position after he had started his campaign—the Ahom king was not obligated to hand over the territory to the Mughals since he had acquired it from the Koch and not from the Mughals.

Mir Jumla, who had arrived in Golconda from Persia seeking fortune, and who rose through the ranks to become a general, now amassed an army to invade Assam himself. His party was accompanied by Dilir Khan, as is the Mughal custom of sending two generals in campaigns, and a force 12,000 cavalry, 30,000 infantry, powerful artillery, a flotilla of 323 warships, Europeans consisting of Dutch gunners manning ghurabs with mounted guns, Portuguese naval officers, English fighters, Muscovites and Armenian horsemen.

== Invasion of Koch Bihar ==
Mir Jumla's Invasion of Assam
Some key locations:
1 Khizirpur
2 Baritala
3 Hatshila
4 Koch Bihar
5 Rangamati
6 Jogighopa
7 Pancharatna
8 Saraighat
9 Pandu
10 Simalugarh
11 Samdhara
12 Kaliabor
13 Kukurakata
14 Lakhau
60 Garhgaon
61 Tipam

Mir Jumla and the Mughal force left Khizrpur on 1 November, 1661. From Baritala, instead of taking the well-guarded Ekduar route or the narrow jungle-lined Khuntaghat path, Mir Jumla chose a little-known unguarded route along a low embankment, discovered by his scouts even as his fleet secured the waterway from Ghoraghat to the Brahmaputra. On 13 December the Koch guards fled as Mir Jumla and Sujan Singh neared the border. Pran Narayan escaped to Kathalbari at the foot of the hills of Bhutan while the minister fled to Maurang. Mir Jumla entered the capital without resistance on 19 December 1661 and annexed Koch Bihar—he established a faujdar with 1,400 cavalry and 2,000 musketeers, the revenue was fixed, and the name of Koch Bihar was changed to ‘Alamgirnagar’. The Raja's son embraced Islam and offered to arrest his father. His minister-general Bhavnath, who had marched into Kamrup, was imprisoned. But Mir Jumla couldn't capture the Raja who was protected by the Dharmaraja of Bhutan. Mir Jumla didn't pursue any further—on 4 January 1662, he left for Assam leaving behind Isfandyar Khan as the acting Faujdar to defend Alamgirnagar with troops and weapons.

=== Pran Narayan's recovery of Koch Bihar ===
The people of the Koch capital resented the Mughal revenue system. Within a few months during the rainy season Pran Narayan killed Mohammed Salih, the mansabdar who had opposed him at Kathalbari, cut off the supplies to Isfandyar Khan who escaped to Ghoraghat, and when the permanent Faujdar, Askar Khan, tried to, he was unable to recover it. The invasion of the Koch Bihar country thus ended without any gain for the Mughals.

== Invasion of Kamrup ==
Mir Jumla left a part of troops with Isfandiyar Khan at Koch Bihar and began his march into Assam on 4 January 1662—he reached Rashid Khan's camp at Rangamati via Khuntaghat—he now added Rashid Khan's troops to his own. Unfamiliar with the terrain, Mir Jumla let the Brahmaputra river guide him; as his fleet moved along the Brahmaputra, led by Ibn Hussain, his army moved along the northbank, with Dilir Khan in the vanguard. Dilir Khan and Mir Murtaza were responsible for building the road across the forests, reeds, marshes, and rivers along which the rest of the army followed. Progress was slow—four or five miles a day.

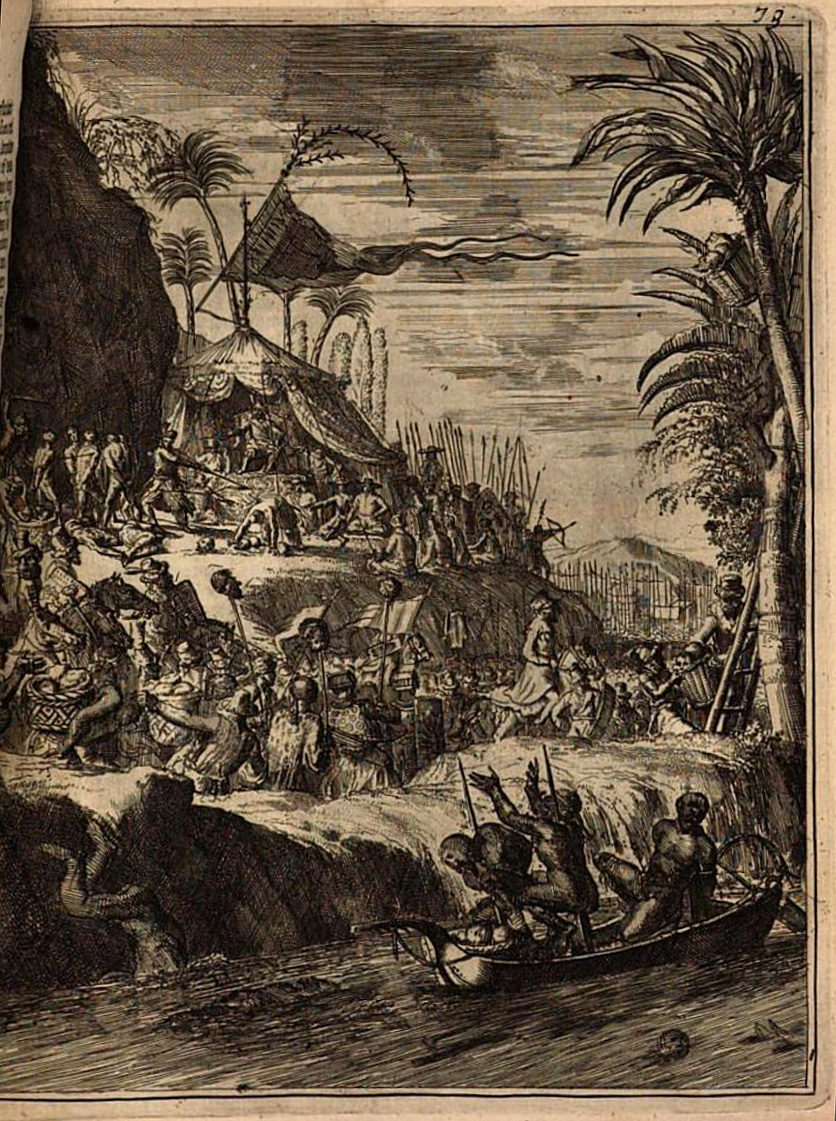
Battle of Mogul Mir Jumla with Assam, 1661-62.

=== Ahom strategic fortifications ===
The Brahmaputra valley is narrow with the river running east to west and hills and mountains on north and south quite close to the river except in central Assam. The Ahoms, thus created a chain of twin forts straddling the river at strategic places so that invaders would have to face a chain of forts along the river. There were three such major twin forts: (1) Jogighopa and Pancharatan just west of Manas; (2) Saraighat and Pandu just west of Barnadi, and (3) Samdhara and Simalugarh just east of the river Bharali. Each of these forts generally were placed on higher strategic grounds with a natural defense—river, forest, or hills—surrounding it partly. Man-made barriers were walls and ramparts on higher ground, or mud on lower ground. The approaches were usually had holes in the ground with pointed bamboo stakes (panjis) for horses to fall into, ditches with water, and ditches with bamboo stakes. The walls of these forts were generally made of mud, and had cannons mounted on them. The first two pairs were newly built.

The Jogighopa fort was commanded by Baduli Phukan and its southern counterpart by the Phul Barua Phukan and Lahan Phukan, Saraighat by Pikchai Chetia and Pandu by Rajasahur Borphukan, Samdhara by Banrukia Borgohain and Simalugarh by Ghora Konwar Phukan, and helped by the Buragohian, Borpatrogohain, Namanial Rajasahur Borchetia, Charing Raja (the future king), and Rup Handikoi.

=== Ahom troubles ===
Even as the Ahoms were arrayed to defend against Mir Jumla's invasion, trouble arose for the Ahoms. Dissatisfied with the Tangsu Handikoi Borbarua's appropriating the spoils of capturing Koch Hajo, the Ahom king Sutamla deputed Manthir Bharali Barua inquire and mete out punishments with powers higher than the Borphukan's, who was then the commander of Pandu. The Bharali Barua's actions caused dissent within the ranks of the forward commanders, especially the Borphukan; and forward commanders from Manas river abandoned their posts.

=== Fall of Manas river forts ===
Mir Jumla reached Jogighopa on 17 January 1662 and occupied it without a fight on 20 January 1662 since the Baduli Phukan, the Ahom commander, abandoned it. Buranjis give multiple reasons why Baduli Phukan abandoned the fort—one version suggests that this was because of the disaffection of the forward commanders arising out of Manthir Bharali Barua's activities, whereas another suggests an outbreak of cholera. The southbank fort, Pancharatan, under the commands of Phul Barua and Ahatguria Lahan Phukan gave fight but it was overcome; and both these forces retreated to Samdhara.

=== Fall of Bornadi river forts ===
Leaving Ataullah in command of the Jogighopa fort, Mir Jumla crossed the Manas river and then advanced east in three formations—Mir Jumla and the main Mughal force along the north bank, the fleet along the river, and a section of the troops under Sayyid Nasiruddin Khan along the south bank. The Ahom king sent reinforcements to the Bornadi forts, but they did not reach their destination in time. Soon after taking Hajo Mir Jumla reached Guwahati on 4 February 1662 where he instructed Rashid Khan to go around and encircle the Saraighat fort and the Ahom forces could barely evacuate in the middle of the night. The fort on the south bank, Pandu under the Rajasahur Borphukan, too evacuated and both the Bornadi river forts were lost to the Ahoms without offering any resistance to the Mughals and Mir Jumla occupied Guwahati, the capital of Kamrup, after 5 February 1662.

Mughal forces then took Beltola in a night attack, massacred the soldiers, and accepted the submission of the Koch ruler of Darrang, an Ahom vassal. Mir Jumla established a thanadar at Guwahati and began his march into the heart of the Ahom kingdom on 7 February 1662. At this point the Ahom forces were in disarray.

== Invasion of Ahom kingdom ==
Sutamla tried to regroup his forces under a new order of battle: he placed the north bank army under the command of the Banrukia Borgohain and assisted by Kenduguria Borpatrogohain, Baduli Phukan, Tipam Raja, and Dihingia Rajkhowa; the south bank army under the command of Ghora-konwar Nyaysodha Phukan to be assisted by Banhgarhia Burhagohain, Namanial Rajasahur Borchetia, Rup Handikoi, Sadiyakhowa Gohain, Charing Raja, and others; he dismiised his father-in-law Garhgaiya Rajasahur from the Borphukan-ship because of his failure to resist the Mughals at Pandu and replaced him with another father-in-law, the Namanial Rajasahur, but asked him to help in the south bank. He also designated some other commanders at various forts.

Mir Jumla advanced east with the main army along the north bank, but then suddenly, in a two-day operation (15 and 16 February 16162), moved his entire army to the south bank at Borsola midway between Guwahati and Samdhara. This caused great confusion in the Ahom camps—the Ghora Konwar Phukan in command at Simalugarh asked for reinforcements from the Banrukia Borgohain commanding the Samdhara on the northern bank, but the Borgohain, suspecting a stratagem, refused to lower the strength of his forces. The Mir, now in the plains of Nagaon, was shown around by the agents of the Banhgarhia Rajasahur, smarting at losing the Borphukanship. Here, the ruler of Dimarua, an Ahom vassal, submitted to the Mughals. Mir Jumla reached within striking of Simalugarh on 20 February 1662.

=== Battle of Simalugarh and Ahom retreat from Samdhara ===
Mir Jumla reached Simalugarh on 20 February 1662 and observing the strength of the fort decided on a siege instead of storming. The Mughals were subjected to around the clock artillery fire. Dilir Khan and some of Mir Jumla's men were able to put up stockades close to the fort and fend of sallies, and there was a stalemate. On the midnight of 25 February Dilir Khan, guided by an Assamese went around the fort with a section of the artillery and 1,500 horsemen even as Mir Murtaza and Miana Khan's men continued to pound the front. Dilir Khan was discovered, and attacked from the fort by a rain of arrows, but he and his men were able to scale the wall, upon which the under-manned Ahoms scattered and the fort fell to the Mughals.

The fall of Simalugarh so disheartened the Samdhara fort that Banrukia Borgohain, who was in command, destroyed his munitions and abandoned it. Mir Jumla occupied the fort without a fight and placed a garrison there under Kishen Singh. Atan Burhugohain, who was at Simalugarh, moved back to the capital for consultation. The Mughals now have ventured past the Bharali river for the first time in history. Mir Jumla then took Kaliabor, the seat of the Borbarua at the time of Momai Tamuli Borbarua, easily before 2 March; and having placed Sayyid Nasiruddin Khan as the faujdar, pressed further east.

=== Naval battle at Kukurakata ===
Mir Jumla left Kaliabor on 2 March 1662 marching upstream. At a certain point the banks of the river Brahmaputra becomes hilly, and the land forces had to turn away from the river. On the night of 3 March the land forces were about six miles away from the Mughal ships, numbered around 100, moored at Kukurakata. The Ahoms, under the Borgohain, attacked the Mughal ships, hoping to cut off the Mughal land forces from their supply lines. The Mughal ships were primarily with European sailors, which were then under Munawwar Khan with the commander Ibn Hussain away. The Ahom ships, numbering in the 700-800's started firing at the small number of Mughal forces, but the larger Ahom ships were less maneuverable and were swept downstream by the strong Brahmaputra currents. The European sailors were experts and desperate and their leaders worked well with the Mughal admirals to effectively stand off the initial attack. Mir Jumla, hearing the cannonade, sent in a small contingent under Muhammad Mumin Beg Ekkataz Khan, who sounded the war horn upon his arrival at Kukurakata. The Ahoms, on hearing the horn, thought reinforcements had arrived and began to scatter. As they tried to escape, on foot as well as by ship, they were captured—about 21,000 men, 300 ships, and 400 big guns. The Ahom attack ended disastrously, and the Ahom naval forces were unable to recover from this loss.

With the defeat of the Borgohain's forces, the primary defensive responsibilities fell on the Burhagohain, with the assistance of Baghchowal Khamon Rajmantri, the Naobaicha Phukan and the Chengmun Phukan.

=== Fall of Lakhau ===
Mir Jumla then reached Salagrah, which too was abandoned; and here Mir Jumal received a peace offer, which he refused to entertain. The Ahom king then sent his envoy, Sanatan Kataki, to his commanders—the Borgohain of the northern army and the Nyaysodha Phukan of the southern army—to converge on Lakhau and defend it. Sanatan Kataki was captured by the Mir Jumla's forces but the Ahom commanders did get the message. The Borgohain moved his army to the southern bank in a single night and provided a joint defense, but the Ahom armies were not able to withstand the Mughal attack and Mir Jumla, guided by Ahom deserters, took Lakhau on 8 March.

=== Sutamla's flight from Garhgaon ===
With the fall of Lakhau, the Ahom kingdom's last of its conventional defense ended and Sutamla's only option was flight. He gathered whatever goods he could carry with him in a thousand boats and fled, accompanied by the Borbarua and the Borphukan, first to Charaideo and then to Taraisat. The three dangarias then removed from Garhgaon what the king could not remove, though not all could be removed. Sutamla then consulted with his high officers at Taraishat and determining that the situation was impossible he retreated further inland into Tipam, which is about a 14-days journey away from his capital Garhgaon.

=== Mir Jumal's march into the Ahom capital ===
Mir Jumla left Lakhau on 12 March 1662, taking along with him a number of Assamese deserters. He left his naval fleet behind since the Dihing river was too narrow. Mir Jumla's route included Dergaon (13/14 March), Gajpur (15 March), and Trimohani (16 March). From Trimohani, he marched along the Dikhau and entered the abandoned Garhgaon palace of the Ahom king Sutamla on 17 March 1662.

== Ahom war council ==
At Raishat (Taraishat), Sutamla held a war council that was attended by most high officers and military commanders. Here, the king decided to first send out a peace proposal to Mir Jumla, and then the council drew up a plan on strategy, the divisions of forces, tactics, methods of attack, and the management and governance of the civil population.

=== Ahom guerrilla warfare: daga-juddha ===
Atan Burhagohain, who was appointed the Burhagohain in January of that same year after the natural death of the previous Buragohain, then developed a set of unique defensive methods that came to be called daga-juddha locally, which were akin to modern-day guerrilla tactics used in asymmetric warfare. He instructed his men to kill but not to get themselves killed. Thus, his soldiers would not openly confront Mughal forces but rely on surprise attack, night raids, ambushes, targeting supply lines, ammunition depots and preventing Ahom provisions from falling into Mughal hands. Against Mughal personnel they wantonly killed isolated smaller groups or they impaled captured Mughal soldiers with a small spiked iron implement that could not be retracted and released them, only for the soldiers to die a slow and horrible death back in their camps. These methods, used eventually by all other Ahom commanders, caused the Mughals to become fearful and though these methods did not directly cause the Mughals to leave Assam, they wore the Mughal soldiers down.

== Mughal occupation of the Ahom capital ==
Garhgaon Region
Some key locations:
1 Lakhau
2 Dergaon
3 Gajpur
4 Trimohani
5 Tiru
6 Mathurapur
7 Charaideo
8 Salaguri
9 Teok
60 Garhgaon
61 Tipam
62 Namrup
63 Solaguri

=== War spoils and pillage ===
Mir Jumla gained an enormous amount of war spoils. He gained possession of 82 elephants, the most valuable item, 300,000 rupees and articles from the palace, 675 big guns, 1343 zamburaks, 1,200 ramchangis, 6,570 matchlocks, about 12 tons of gunpowder, and other powders, 7,828 iron shields, and immeasurable amounts of saltpetre, iron, sulphur, and lead, Mir Jumla also trawled tanks for zamburaks, matchlocks, and other weapons. At Lakhau and Trimohani, two Ahom dockyards, he took possession of 100 bacharis and 1000 sea-going warships. Furthermore, food grains in reserve for the king and his officials, enough for a few years, also fell into Mir Jumla's hands that became crucial later during the rainy season. He also pillaged some temples (Kamakhya temple, Luna Chamari, Jogi Ismail, and Dergaon) and the burial mounds (Moidams) of past Ahom kings, recovering goods worth about 90,000 rupees. He considered the spoils and pillages as imperial property and entrusted Mir Murtaza with their safeguard. The riches were transported to Dhaka, the capital of the Bengal Subah, as reported by contemporary sources.

=== Mughal military governance ===
Mir Jumla established military commands at the strategic locations swiftly. He established two faujdars: Guwahati (Muhammed Beg) and Kaliabor (Sayyid Nasiruddin Khan) and a number of thanadars: Jogighopa (Ataullah), Kajali (Hasan Beg Zanganah), Samdhara (Sayyid Mirza), Dergaon (Ali Reza Beg), Gajpur (Anwar Beg), Trimohani (Mir Nurallah), and Namdang (Muhammad Muqim). Lakhau became a naval and primary military base, under Ibn Hussain. A number of other military officers and zamindars from Bengal were attached to Lakhau to help control the Ahoms in Majuli.

In addition to these garrisons Mir Jumla placed Garhgaon, with the Ahom palace and captured riches, under Mir Murtaza and he moved to Mathurapur after just three days at Garhgaon to plot the capture of more territory the Ahom king. Both Garhgaon and Mathurapur were protected by out outposts: Salpani (Miara Khan), Deopani (Ghazi Khan), bank of the Dihing northeast of Garhgaon (Jalal Khan Dariabadi), and Abhoypur (Adam Khan).

Though these garrisons were created, their lines of communication were precarious, and susceptible to Ahom surprise attacks, and the Ahoms did attack these lines till the advent of the rains, which arrived earlier than usual in 1662.

Mir Jumla used severe methods on captured Assamese to induce them to switch sides and join him. He offered his Dutch soldiers fifty rupees for every dead and a hundred rupees for each captured. Recalcitrant prisoners were whipped and then beheaded but those who either helped him or remained neutral were treated kindly.

=== Mughal civil governance ===
Though Mir Jumla was able to establish military command centers he failed to remove or capture the Ahom king, he failed to win over the local population, or establish a settled and stable government. The peasants of the Ahom kingdom too deserted their homes and moved to the hills as the Mughal forces advanced and the Naga peoples, who controlled the hills, accommodated them. During the rainy season, when the Mughals were confined to their camps and under attack from the Ahom forces, the peasants came down from the hills to harvest their ahu crop, and then returned to the hills.

Mir Jumla tried to negotiate with high Ahom officers and lure them to his side. He sent feelers first to the Borgohain, and then to Manthir Bharali Baruah, promising to leave the kingdom in their hands, but he did not succeed.

While initially militarily successful winning the Battle of Kalibor and occupying the Ahom capital, the invasion bogged down the Mughal army placing strain on supplies and limiting movement. Mir Jumla faced threats desertion from portions of his army in Assam since the monsoon season interrupted supplies, but the army survived.

== Ahom counter offensive ==
When the rains started the Ahoms, who were in retreat, began their offensive moves. They divided themselves into five groups: one group went to Majuli to attack Lakhau; the second group remained in the Gajpur-Tromohani area; the third group moved to Kalia hills, south of Chinatali; the fourth group to Dimau-Salaguri area northeast of present-day Sibsagar district; and the fifth group to Taukak-Barhat at the Naga foothills.

=== Ahoms take Gajpur and break Mughal supply lines ===
The rains flooded the plains, some of it aided by the Ahoms building trenches and embankments rendering the Mughal cavalry, which the Ahoms had no answer for, ineffective in the muddy and marshy land. The Ahoms avoided pitched battles; instead they focused on cutting off communication and disrupting supply lines. Communication between even Garhgaon and Mathurapur became impossible without military escorts because of Ahom guerrilla attacks. On 10 May the Bhitarual Phukan killed the thanadar Anwar Beg and overran Gajpur, an important thana protecting the supply between Lakhau and Garhgaon/Mathurapur. Another concerted effort on Dergaon, yet another thana between Lakhau and Garhgaon, failed when the commander, the nephew of the Bargohain, fell in battle.

The Mughal admiral Ibn Hussain sent a flotilla under Ali Beg to reinforce Gajpur, but it was overwhelmed by the Ahoms before it could reach Gajpur and it had to retreat to Bansbari, between Dergaon and Gajpur. An attack on Lakhau by the Bhitarual Phukan failed, and Ibn Hussain was able to secure Mughal positions eventually.

=== Mir Jumla's failure to reestablish lines ===
Mir Jumla appointed Sarandaz Khan Uzbeg the new thanadar for Gajpur, and tasked him with restoring communication with Lakhau, but he could not advance beyond Teok (between Trimohani in the east and Gajpur on the west) on account of the floods. Mir Jumla sent ships under Mohammad Murad to aid Uzbeg, but his flotilla was captured by the Ahoms on 23 May and he fled to Tromohani by land. Mir Jumla then sent Farhad Khan on 27 May, but he too could not advance further than Teok. Farad Khan and Sarandaz Khan Uzbeg then decided to retreat to Trimohani, but the Ahoms had built trenches and ditches and flooded them by joining them to the Dihing river and blocked their path to Trimohani. The Bhitarual Phukan encircled the retreating Mughal group with small boats; the contingent was trapped but survived on slaughtered cavalry horses and oxen. A relief party from Mir Jumla, under Muhammad Mumin Beg Ekkataz Khan, could not advance beyond Trimohani and another planned relief under Dilir Khan using elephants had to be given up. The trapped Mughal contingent under Farhad eventually broke free following a stratagem worked by the Bundela Raja Sujan Singh and reached Trimohani on 6 June.

=== Mir Jumla isolated in Garhgaon and Mathurapur ===
Farhad Khan's failure to go beyond Teok and reach Gajpur, leave alone Dergaon or Lakhau, meant that now the Ahoms controlled all roads, and waterways between Trimohani and Lakhau. Mir Jumal withdrew all thanadars and outposts—Adam Khan barely managed to reach Mathurapur, and all others withdrew to Garhgaon—and the Ahoms recovered their territories east of Lakhau except for Garhgaon and Mathurapur. The Ahom control of the supply route was so complete that Delhi, receiving no news from Mir Jumla, gave up all hopes and assumed that the entire Army had perished.

With Mir Jumla's army now trapped, Sutamla came away from Namrup and camped at Solaguri, which was about four-days away from Garhgaon, to better direct his commanders. He appointed Baduli Phukan as the Neog Phukan (commander of all Ahom forces). He created a six-mile long embankment along the Dilli river between the southern hills and the Dihing river. He attacked Mathurapur repeatedly at night, but after a crushing defeat from Diler Khan, the attacks stopped. The Ahoms under Chakra Gohain, the Charing Raja, attacked Garhgaon but he failed to take it, thwarted by Sujan Singh.

=== Siege of Garhgaon ===
Baduli Phukan, and new Neog Phukan, then focused on a siege of Garhgaon. Mir Jumla deputed Farhad Khan to join Mir Murtaza in its defense. The Ahoms attacking at night, were able to wound Farhad Khan on 8 July and take over half the fortifications, but were unable to hold on to the gains and fell back. The Ahoms made repeated attempts on 12, 15, 17, and 18 July without success. Mir Jumal then sent Rashid Khan to replace Farhad Khan who was able to disperse the entrenched Ahoms on 23 July and vanquish the siege.

=== Epidemic and Mughals under siege ===
The garrisons of the Mughal forces entrapped in Garhgaon and Mathurapur faced severe discomfitures. Of the 173 paddy heaps the Mughal army had control over at the beginning of the rainy season, only 16 could be saved from flood and the Ahoms and as a result the Mughal soldiers had to survive on coarse rice. Essential luxuries guaranteed to the soldiers—wheat, dal, ghee, salt, sweetmeats, etc.—became scarce. Initially boiled beef was available, and when that became unavailable the soldiers had to slaughter horses, camels, and elephants. Other goods, such as opium and tobacco, which the soldiers were depended on, became scare too causing general distress in the ranks.

A cholera epidemic broke out in August that affected both the Ahoms and the Mughal garrison in the Mathurapur area initially. Hundreds were dying daily and since the dead could not be given proper burial the corpses floated down the rivers and contaminated drinking water as far away as Lakhau. Diler Khan's troops lost two-third of its strength to this epidemic. Finding it unbearable, Mir Jumal moved those able-bodied to Garhgaon on 17 August, leaving the infirm behind. The Mathurapur contingent then infected the Garhgaon contingent. In this epidemic the Ahoms too lost a large section of the population, estimated to be about 2,300,000. The famine-like situation and the epidemic was so desperate that those in Garhgaon ate leaves and grass. These conditions had a strong demoralizing effect on the ranks, though Mir Jumla stood firm in his resolve to capture the Ahom king.

== Final stalemate ==
By 20 September 1662 the floods had receded and the fearsome Mughal cavalry, though depleted, was mobile again. Ibn Hussain, the admiral at Lakhau, reoccupied Dergaon on 5 September after Bhitarual Phukan had abandoned it; and Mir Jumla dispatched Abul Hassan to reconnect with the Mughal navy; Abul Hassan occupied Gajpur first and then reached Dergaon. And with the logistic chain re-established with Lakhau, Abul Hassan was able to deliver news and letters from Mir Jumla to Aurangzeb; and in return provisions eventually reached the Mughal army at Garhgaon—the first on 24 October and the second on 31 October accompanied by Abul Hassan. With the Mughal situation much improved and ready to move the Ahom king retreated to the Namrup hills.

== Aftermath ==
With the end of the monsoon conditions would once more enable the imperial army to effectively campaign. Ahom was further weakened by the defection of several nobles and releasing that they could not endure another season of campaigning Ahom sued for peace. The Treaty of Ghilajharighat was concluded, with the following terms:

1. Jayadhwaj Singh to send his six-year-old daughter named Ramani Gabharu to the Imperial harem.
2. Twenty thousand tolas of gold, six times this quantity of silver and forty elephants to be made over at once.
3. Three hundred thousand tolas of silver and ninety elephants to be supplied within twelve months.
4. Six sons of the chief nobles to be made over as hostages pending compliance with the last mentioned condition.
5. Twenty elephants to be supplied annually.
6. The country west of the Bharasi river on the north bank of Brahmaputra, and of the Kallang on the south, to be ceded to the Emperor of Delhi.
7. All prisoners and the family of the Baduli Phukan to be given up.

Sarkar's analysis is that Mir Jumla achieved peace with honour, indeed being rewarded by the emperor. Pratyay analyses that the treaty terms were enough to save the face of Mir Jumla.

Hostages and gold were exchanged on 5 January 1663. There were further rounds of negotiations as a proposed hostages had died from smallpox in since the treaty had been negotiated. Mir Jumla settled for the hostages that he had received, as well as the gold and elephants and announced to his army that they would leave Assam on 10 January.

The march out of Ahom was meticulously planned, with the treasures both secured by treaty and those plundered from Garhgaon secured. Road construction enabled the army to move at good pace through the jungle, with it wide enough to allow passage by six horsemen together.

Upon reaching Lakhau, dispute arose with the Ahoms wishing that the border followed the 1638 treaty, while Mir Jumla insisted that the newly concluded treaty was followed. After the border demarcated according to the 1663 treaty, the army continued on to Pandu arriving on the 11th of February where arrangements were made to administer the re-captured territory of Kamrup, where despite a worsening illness Mir Jumla appointed Rashid Khan its faujdar and Muhammad Khalil Bakhshi, and placed the hostages in charge of the former. Five hundred men and forty warships were left with Rashid Khan to defend the reconquered territory.

During the return march Mir Jumla's fever worsened, and he delegated much active command to Diler Khan, before he died on 30 March.

Mir Jumla's Ahomese adversary - the King Sutamla died soon after in 1663. The territorial acquisitions of Mir Jumla were short-lived, the subsequent Ahomese King Chakradhwaj Singha, used the peace to strengthen Ahom militarily and economically given the destruction it had suffered during the invasion of Mir Jumla before hostilities resumed in 1667 during which the Ahomese would successful reverse many of the dissatisfactory border changes imposed by the treaty of Ghilajharighat.
