= Sulikpha =

Ahom king from 1679 to 1681

Sulikphaa
- Chaopha Swargadeo of Ahom Kingdom

Ahom King
- Reign: 1679 – 12 August 1681
- Predecessor: Sudoipha
- Successor: Gadadhar Singha
- Born: Sarugohain c. 1665; Ahom kingdom
- Died: 1681 (aged 16); Namrup, Ahom kingdom
Names
- Lora Raja Ratnadhwaj Singha
- House: Samuguria
- Dynasty: Ahom dynasty
- Religion: Hinduism

Sulikpha (born Sarugohain; c. 1665 – August 1681), known by the Hindu name Ratnadhwaj Singha, and also referred to as the Lora Raja, was Ahom King from 1679 until his deposal in 1681.

He was only 14 years of age when Laluksola Borphukan, the Ahom viceroy of Guwahati and Lower Assam, raised him to the throne, after deposing the former king, Sudoipha. Due to his young age at the time of his accession, he was generally known as Lora Raja or the Boy-king. His reign was characterized by the atrocities committed by Laluksola Borphukan, who held the real authority behind the throne, in his name. The most notorious act which occurred during his reign was the mutilation of Ahom princes belonging to different phoids or clans of the Royal Ahom Dynasty.

While most of the Ahom princes suffered mutilation, Prince Gadapani, the future king Gadadhar Singha, from the Tungkhungia branch of the Royal Ahom Dynasty, escaped, due to the efforts of his illustrious wife, Joymoti Konwari, who refused to divulge any information regarding her husband's whereabouts even in face of the tortures inflicted by the henchmen of Lora Raja. After Laluksola Borphukan was assassinated in court intrigues, the nobles at Kaliabar decided to get rid of the incompetent Lora Raja and put an able prince on the throne. Prince Gadapani, who was living incognito at a place called Rani in Kamrup at that time, was nominated for the throne. Sulikpha was deposed and exiled to Namrup, only to be executed later on.

== Ancestry and accession ==
Sulikpha was a descendant of the Samuguria branch of the Ahom Dynasty. His early name was Sarugohain. He was the grandson of Narayan Tipam Raja, who was the younger brother of the former Ahom king Suhung. In 1679 CE, after having some differences with Atan Burhagohain, the prime-minister of the Ahom kingdom, Laluksola Borphukan, the Ahom Viceroy of Guwahati and Lower Assam, decided to seize power in the Royal Court at Garhgaon. He therefore held treasonable correspondence with the Mughal Subedar of Bengal Subah, Muhammad Azam Shah, son of the Mughal Emperor Aurangzeb, who had already married his niece Ramani Gabharu, alias Rahmat Banu, the daughter of the Ahom king Jaydhwaj Singha, in February 1679, in order to take possession of Guwahati. In return, Borphukan sought assistance from the Mughal prince against Atan Burhagohain, to which the prince readily agreed. In March 1679, Borphukan surrendered Guwahati to the Mughals, and himself marched to the capital, Garhgaon. Atan Burhagohain and his supporters were taken captive. Borphukan initially came to terms with King Sudoipha, but when the king later tried to arrest him for his treasonable act of negotiating with the Mughals, Borphukan deposed the monarch. The original ambition of Borphukan was to declare himself king, but he feared opposition from the orthodox section of the Ahom nobility and Ahom priests, since by the customs of the Ahom kingdom only the members of the Royal Ahom Dynasty, the direct descendants of the first Ahom king, Sukapha, were eligible for the throne. Therefore, in order to maintain control in the court and also to satisfy the other nobles, Borgphukan decided to install a prince whom he could control at will. In October 1679, he fetched 14-year-old Prince Sarugohain from Samaguri, and made him king at Barnaosal. The Ahom priest named the new king Sulikpha, while the Hindu priest named him Ratnadhwaj Singha. On account of his youth at the time of his accession, he was commonly known among the people as Lora Raja or the Boy-King.

== Reign ==
=== Laluk consolidates power in the Royal Court ===
After the accession of Sulikpha to the throne, Laluksola Borphukan became Rajmantri Phukan, or Prime Minister, vested with executive power over the whole administration. Laluk then appointed his supporters to positions of responsibility. Sandikoi Neog was appointed Dakhinkulia Phukan; Bandar Chetia Phukan made Deka Phukan; Bihparua made Neog Phukan; and Jatakari Hazarika named Bhitarual Phukan. Dihingia Kari Deka and Anka, both related to Laluk, were sent down to Kaliabar with the rank of Phukans. Laluk appointed his own younger brother Bhatdhara as Borphukan and sent him down to Kaliabar. Another brother of Laluk, Marangi, was appointed Borbarua. Laluk dismissed many old officers and appointed new ones in their place.

To cement the friendship of the royal house of Samuguri to which Sulikpha or Lora Raja belonged, with the Lukhurakhun clan of which Laluk Rajmantri Phukan was a member, the latter's daughter, who was bald-headed, was given in marriage to Lora Raja, as well as Bhatdhara's daughter. Laluk's daughter was only five years old, and Bhatdhara's daughter, described as being on the verge of youth, was twelve. These matches between minors were intended to increase Laluk's hold on the monarch, and also to serve as a medium through which Laluk would receive prompt intimation of what was going on at the palace.

The new king, Lora Raja, frequently complained about illness, so astrologers were consulted in the matter. The royal astrologers suggested the monarch should change his residence to a healthier place. Accordingly, Lora Raja set up his residence at a place called Meteka. Laluk Rajmantri Phukan fixed his abode in its immediate vicinity. He mounted guns on the wall of his compound and lived with great vigilance and caution. The Phukans and other officers had to attend the court of the Swargadeo and the Rajmantri Phukan and pay their obeisance to both.

=== Execution of Atan Burhagohain ===
Immediately after consolidating his hold on the court, Laluk Rajmantri Phukan proceeded to execute his archrival Atan Burhagohain, who was held captive in Kaliabar. During the reign of the former ruler, Sudoipha, he had been unable to obtain the approval of the monarch for the execution of Atan Burhagohain. Besides, at that time Laluk had not fully consolidated his power, and the execution of a popular and respected leader like Atan Burhagohain would place Laluk in bad odour with the nobles and the masses. But after Lora Raja became king Laluk's position was very much strengthened, and therefore he renewed his plan for the destruction of Atan Burhagohain. “A number of men, including the Burhagohain, are confined at Kaliabar”, said Laluk. “What is Your Majesty’s intention with regard to these prisoners?” Lora Raja, who understood the drift of Laluk's question, had no alternative but to order their execution.

Two emissaries, Metekatalia Khona Chaudang Barua of the Borgohain family and Rangason Chaorak Saikia of the Banchengia Borpatrogohain family, were dispatched to Kaliabar to carry out the order of execution. Atan Burhagohain and his elder brother Naobaisa Phukan were put to death in the garden of Solal Gohain in Kaliabar. Langkham Deka, son of Atan Burhagohain, was taken as a prisoner to his family residence at Bahgara near Garhgaon, where he was subsequently put to death under the orders of the king. Meanwhile, one Dighala, son of Sukulahudu Burhagohain, was appointed as the new Burhagohain of the Ahom kingdom.

=== Embassy from the Mughal Subedar of Bengal; Laluk dons the Regalia ===
After successfully capturing Atan Burhagohain and his supporters, Laluk sent messages to the Mughal prince Muhammad Azam expressing his intention of becoming king of the Ahom kingdom and seeking military assistance from the Mughals. Laluk also sent many gifts and presents to Muhammad Azam and his wife Ramani Gabharu, alias Rahmat Banu, who happened to be his own niece. But before the messengers arrived in Dacca, the Mughal headquarters of Bengal, Prince Azam left for Rajputana under the orders of his father, Emperor Aurangzeb. The new Mughal Subedar, Nawab Shaista Khan, who happened to be the brother of the famous Mumtaz Mahal and the uncle of Aurangzeb, received the envoys sent by Laluk. Owing to disturbances in Rajputana and Deccan, Shaista Khan was unwilling to send a fresh military expedition to Assam. He therefore sent his own envoy Govindram along with a letter addressed to Laluk, in which Laluk was addressed as the King of Assam. This was a great occasion for Laluk Rajmantri Phukan, since Mughal envoys from the Subedar of Bengal arrived in Assam with letters and gifts specifically addressed to him, but not to the monarch, a very rare action. Laluk Rajmantri Phukan dressed himself for the occasion in the robes and ornaments worn by Ahom monarchs and decided to receive the Mughal envoy at a place called Sakbari. He removed from the royal storehouse the canopy used by the kings for the ceremony of receiving foreign ambassadors. Laluk dressed himself in the royal attire, sat under the royal canopy and thus received the Mughal envoy Govindram at Sakbari. The envoy delivered the gifts and presents sent by Shaista Khan to Laluk Rajmantri Phukan and read out the contents of the letter, in which Laluk was addressed as the king of Assam. Laluk also turned over presents and letters to his envoy Bhusan Kandali Kataki to be delivered to Nawab Shaista Khan. The Assamese envoy left for Dacca in the company of the Mughal envoy Govindram.

=== Mutilation of the princes of the Royal Ahom Dynasty ===
After the Sakbari ceremony receiving the Mughal envoy, Laluk Rajmantri Phukan decided to take measures to realize his ambition of becoming the king of Assam. He was aware that even though he had been recognized as Raja of Assam or king of Assam by the Mughal Subedar of Bengal, it was difficult to declare himself king, as the orthodox section of the Ahom nobility and common people would always consider the descendants of King Sukapha the rightful heirs to the throne of Assam. He also knew that Lora Raja was a mere puppet whom he could remove at will, but the other princes of royal blood, all descended from King Sukapha, would always be an obstacle to fulfilling his goal of ascending the throne. Therefore, Laluk proposed before Lora Raja to mutilate the limbs of all the able-bodied princes belonging to the Royal Ahom dynasty. The Ahoms considered their king of divine origin and the person of the monarch sacred, and any noticeable sear or blemish, even a scratch received in play, a pit of smallpox, or a wound received in action, was a bar to succession. In support of his proposal Laluk argued that in the presence of this numerous body of princes, each of whom was a potential center for insurrection and a rallying point for miscreants and rebels, no Ahom king could sit on the throne safely. After obtaining consent from Lora Raja, Laluk instituted a vigorous search for the princes and dispatched emissaries to different quarters to scour the villages and princely establishments. Those whom Laluk's agents could lay their hands on were captured and either killed, or released after mutilation, thereby disqualifying them for succession. In order to escape from the hands of Laluk's agents, most of the princes left their homes, lived in disguise in the houses of their relatives and friends, wandered incognito in remote districts, or even crossed the borders of Assam.

=== Gadapani’s flight and Jaimati’s self sacrifice ===
The principal target of Laluk Rajmantri Phukan’s campaign of massacring princes was Gadapani of the Tungkhungia royal family, first, because he was the son of Gobar Roja, who had sat on the throne, thereby making his son Gadapani’s claim just and unassailable; second, because Prince Gadapani was admired for his personal vigour and energy, thereby rendering his candidature readily acceptable to the nobles and officials.

Being fully aware of Laluk’s designs against him, Prince Gadapani left his ancestral home at Tungkhung and roamed from place to place as a fugitive, assuming a disguise when necessary. His two sons Lai and Lechai, aged about fourteen and twelve, were kept in a retreat in the Naga Hills out of fear of Laluk Rajmantri Phukan, who would not spare the lives of even minor princes. The agents of Laluk Rajmantri Phukan reported to their master their inability to trace Gadapani or obtain any information about his whereabouts. Laluk could not feel secure until he knew precisely the movements and intentions of Gadapani. His emissaries, led by one Gidagathi Hazarika of Dakhinpat, instituted a more vigorous search for Gadapani and came upon his wife Jaimati, who they thought must be aware of her husband's refuge. It is not certain whether Jaimati really knew Gadapani’s precise whereabouts, as Gadapani used to move from one place to another. Still, when questioned about Gadapani she pleaded her ignorance of his movements. Gidagathi Hazarika was not satisfied with the answer, and he inflicted tortures on Jaimati to elicit information from her about her husband. The princess stuck to her old plea of ignorance and replied to the increasing tortures with silence and patient forbearance. She was pregnant at the time, and she finally died in the midst of her tortures.

=== Assassination of Laluk ===
The incompetence of Lora Raja and the autocratic behavior of Laluk Rajmantri Phukan created a lawless situation in the Ahom kingdom. The government was now on the verge of collapse, life and property were insecure, and the Mughals, who were the masters of Guwahati and Lower Assam, pushed the border eastwards into the Ahom kingdom. The people in general realized the necessity of restoring the country to peace and order. The Tai Ahom priests, the Deodhais, who considered themselves to be the guardians of the throne and of the peace and prosperity of the kingdom, now took action. They thought that the gods were indignant with Assam because they had not been duly propitiated for a long time. The Deodhais therefore advised Lora Raja to offer human sacrifices to the Kechaikhaiti, alias Tamreswari Mandir, or the copper temple at Sadiya. The Bar-deodhai or chief priest said to the king, “We should offer some human sacrifices to the temple at Sadiya, since the miseries of the country and of the people do not seem to come to an end.” The king asked Laluk Rajmantri Phukan to search for suitable men to be offered as sacrifices at the copper temple in Sadiya.

A bear now entered the compound of Laluk Rajmantri Phukan and killed two of his men. One Bhotai Deka Saikia, a Kalita by caste, from Nagaon, one of Laluk's retainers, killed the bear with his sword. Having seen such courage on the part of Bhotai, Laluk thought of sacrificing him at the copper temple in Sadiya. Having heard of this, Bhotai consulted with two of his colleagues, Madhav Tamuli and Aghona Kachari, saying, “If strong and healthy men are annually sacrificed to the goddess, then how will it be possible for good Hindus to survive?” They then conspired against their master Laluk Rajmantri Phukan and obtained support from one of the prominent ministers, Dighala Burhagohain. The three men took into their confidence several women serving in Laluk's household. With their assistance they entered Laluk's sleeping apartment by night and stabbed him to death when he was fast asleep. The ladies of the house raised a hue and cry, but they were silenced by the threat of immediate decapitation. Angara, Thokola and Jagara, the three sons of Laluk Rajmantri Phukan, were summoned to their father's residence, together with the Jatakaria Phukan, on the pretext of a faked invitation, and killed by Bhotai and his adherents. They also put to death Chungi Hazarika. Laluk's brother Marangi Borbarua initially escaped, but was afterwards captured by Dighala Burhagohain and imprisoned in his brother's Hatishall or elephant stall. These events took place on Tuesday, the tenth of Agrahayan, 1602 Saka, or November 24, 1680 CE.

=== Anarchy in the Capital ===
Bhotai Deka and Madha Tamuli received universal applause for putting Laluksola Borphukan to death and thereby ridding the country of a common foe and a very sinister influence. They were hailed as patriots and saviours. Encouraged by their success, the two leaders began to dictate the affairs of the capital, and no one dared to oppose their plans and actions. They brought in the personal contingent of the deceased Laluk Rajmantri Phukan and fixed their headquarters in his residence, which had all the attributes of a fortified garrison. The immediate supporters of the monarch could not view with complacency the growing influence of Bhotai and Madha, and the royalists encamped inside the palace enclosure, ready to encounter the forces of Bhotai and Madha if necessary. The two leaders then began to appoint officers of their own. Gidagathi Hazarika was appointed Borphukan, and Holou, grandson of Pikchai Chetia, as Gargayan Deka Phukan. These high-handed actions on the part of Bhotai and Madha militated against the authority of the Swargadeo, but no harsh measures could be adopted, as the two leaders were the idols of the people. Lora Raja's advisers therefore proposed to deal with Bhotai and Madha with consideration and tact. The Phukans attending on the monarch sent two envoys, Madhabcharan Kataki and Ananta Kataki, to ask Bhotai and Madha to come to the palace and offer their submission to His Majesty. Bhotai Deka at first refused the invitation, as he suspected some trap for him and his supporters. But after much persuasion by his comrades, who were threatened with slaughter if he refused the king's invitation, he accepted it. The king sent Gargayan Sandikoi Phukan to escort Bhotai Deka and his adherents to the palace. The insurgents first released Marangi Borbarua and then went to the palace. They were arrested on approaching His Majesty, however. They were then allowed to kneel down before the Swargadeo and solemnly affirm their allegiance, whereupon they were set at liberty. Bhotai Deka Saikia and Madha Tamuli were dismissed from their respective offices, however, and sent home without further punishment. Marangi Borbarua fell prostrate at the feet of the Phukans and begged for mercy. He was let off after having his ears clipped. In obedience to the orders of the king, Bhotai Deka left the capital and proceeded to his home in Nagaon. As he was sailing down to Kaliabar, his boat was sighted by Hulou Deka-Phukan, who signaled to the oarsmen to steer Bhotai's boat toward his own barge. The Phukan transferred Bhotai to his boat and told the king it was inadvisable to allow Bhotai to be at liberty unmutilated. After obtaining the king's permission, Hulou Phukan cut off Bhotai's ears and nose, put out one of his eyes, and let him return to his home in Nagaon.

Laluk’s younger brother Bhatdhara was serving in the office of Borphukan at Kaliabar when his brother was assassinated and all the above events were taking place in the capital. Bhatdhara thereupon fled Kaliabar and sought refuge in Mughal-ruled Guwahati. He requested military aid from the Mughal Subedar of Bengal against the Ahom kingdom, but his requests were turned down, as the Mughals lacked enough military force in the region to invade the Ahom kingdom and wage a new war with the Ahoms. Meanwhile, Lora Raja, after receiving intelligence of Bhatdhara's flight from Kaliabar, appointed Bandar Lanmakharu Chetia as the new Borphukan and instructed him to take charge of the office of Borphukan at Kaliabar.

After the series of events mentioned above, Lora Raja, on the advice of his ministers, shifted his residence from Meteka to Garhgaon, the capital of the Ahom kingdom.

=== Gadapani declared king at Kaliabar ===
Meanwhile, Prince Gadapani, after his flight from Tungkhung, wandered from place to place disguised as Naga, as a petty trader, and sometimes as an ordinary cultivator. He wandered through the Naga hills, Darrang, Nagaon and Kamrup. Finally he sought refuge in the house of a Garo woman at a place called Rani in Kamrup, wearing the garb of a common peasant and working in the fields like an ordinary cultivator. By 1681, internal conflicts among various factions of nobles had weakened the Ahom kingdom. Lora Raja was too young and immature to have any control over his ministers, who often influenced his decisions and actions. The weakness of the Ahom kingdom was visible to the neighbouring hill tribes, who often raided the border villages of the Assamese people. Even the Mughals stationed in Guwahati often encroached on Ahom territory, and tried to interfere in the affairs of the Darrang kingdom, which was a vassal state under the Ahoms.

Frustrated by the inability of Lora Raja to deal with these problems, some of the Ahom nobles began to search for a capable prince for the throne. Two Ahom officers, Chenkak Gargayan Sandikoi Neog Phukan and Khamrak Charingia Phukan, who were serving under Bandar Borphukan in Kaliabar, rose to the occasion. They simultaneously established contact with Gadapani and with other prominent nobles of the royal court. The following nobles and officials of Garhgaon accordingly left for Kaliabar: Dighala Burhagohain, Laithepena Borgohain, Champa Paniphukan, Dihingia Alun Borbarua, Chenglai Phukan and Namdangia Phukan. They declared their object to be the expulsion of the Mughals from Guwahati, and thus they obtained from the monarch everything necessary for the success of their expedition. But after reaching Kaliabar the nobles and the officials from Garhgaon held meetings with Gargayan Sandikoi Phukan and Khamrak Charingia Phukan with the object of appointing a strong prince to replace Lora Raja. Gargayan Sandikoi Phukan and Khamrak Charingia Phukan supported the claims of Prince Gadapani to become king in the place of Lora Raja. All the nobles accepted the proposal except Bandar Borphukan. Even though Bandar Borphukan had married Prince Gadapani's sister, so that they were related, Bandar Borphukan initially opposed the elevation of Gadapani to the throne. Bandar Borphukan’s spiritual guru or mentor, Chota Banamali Bapu, the Satradhikar Gosain or religious head of Dakhinpat Satra or monastery, was also the spiritual mentor of Lora Raja. Therefore, Chota Banamali Bapu tried his best to dissuade Bandar Borphukan and others from rising against Lora Raja. But when all the nobles declared their support for Gadapani, Bandar Borphukan, with no other alternative, accepted Gadapani's claim to the throne. Therefore, on Thursday, the 20th of Sravan, 1603 Saka, or 5 August 1681 CE, Gadapani was declared king by the nobles at Kaliabar.

== Deposition and execution ==
The nobles of Kaliabar then sailed up the Brahmaputra in swift boats, taking with them the newly appointed sovereign Gadapani. Having heard of the march of Gadapani and the Kaliabar nobles towards Garhgaon, Ramdev Deka Gosain, the deputy Satradhikar or religious head of Dakhinpat Satra or monastery, tried to persuade the Phukans to abandon the project, to no avail. On the arrival of the Kaliabar fleet at Dakhinpat, Chota Bananali Gosain met Bandar Borphukan and asked him to give up the idea of conferring kingship on Prince Gadapani, pointing out that the Borphukan and Lora Raja were fellow disciples of the Dakhinpat Satra, and that one should protect the interest of the other. The Borphukan pleaded his inability to accede to the request on the ground that Gadapani was supported by the whole body of nobles, and he alone as an individual could not deviate from the unanimous decision of his colleagues. Angered by Borphukan’s refusal, Banamali Gosain cursed Borphukan, saying his power would disappear and he would lose his rank. In return, the Borphukan also cursed the Gosain, saying that the power and influence of Gosain would also end. Lora Raja prepared to resist, but he had no real supporters, and as the nobles of Kaliabar and Gadapani advanced towards the Capital his army melted away. The nobles of Kaliabar, along with Gadapani, reached Garhgaon on Thursday the 27th of Sravan, 1603 Saka, or 12 August 1681 CE. The same day they deposed Lora Raja and re-affirmed their allegiance to Gadapani, who now assumed the name Gadadhar Singha. Sulikpha or Lora Raja was taken to Namrup on the pretext of being made Namrupia Raja, but he was put to death shortly afterwards.

== Legacy ==
Sulikpha was only fourteen years old when he was made the king of the Ahom Kingdom by Laluksola Borphukan; thus the real power behind the throne was Laluksola Borphukan. Most of the atrocities committed during the reign of Lora Raja were done by the orders of Laluk Borphukan; it is unlikely that Sulikpha or Lora Raja, who was very young and lacked experience, could have issued such notorious orders. But since the orders were issued in his name, the common people and some of the contemporary historians considered Sulikpha or Lora Raja as the chief motivator of all the notorious acts committed during his reign, especially the order to mutilate the princes of the Royal Ahom Dynasty and the torture and death of Joymoti Konwari, wife of Prince Gadapani. As a result, any reign of terror or dictatorship is always compared with the reign of Lora Raja in later Assamese literature.

The only recorded work constructed during the reign of Lora Raja was Dauki Ali.

Lora Raja ultimately succumbed to the politics of the time and suffered the fate of his predecessors. The end of Lora Raja's reign and the beginning of the reign of Gadadhar Singha ushered in a new era of peace and prosperity in the Ahom Kingdom. The kingdom not only emerged stronger, but also recovered Guwahati and Lower Assam from the Mughal invaders and lasted for another 145 years.
