= Sudaipha =

Ahom king from 1677 to 1679

Sudoiphaa
- Chaopha Swargadeo of Ahom Kingdom

Ahom King
- Reign: 1677 – October 1679
- Predecessor: Sujinpha
- Successor: Sulikpha
- Born: Khamcheo; Ahom kingdom
- Died: October 1679; Charaideo, Ahom kingdom
- Spouse: daughter of Atan Buragohain; Daughter of Laluksola Borphukan; Daughter of Mecha; Daughter of Halwa
Names
- Parvatia Raja Tej Singha
- House: Parvatia
- Dynasty: Ahom dynasty
- Religion: Hinduism

Sudaipha or Sudoipha (born Khamcheo; died October 1679), known by the Hindu name Tej Singha, was Ahom King from 1677 until his deposal in 1679.

After deposing king Sujinpha, Atan Burhagohain, the Prime Minister of Ahom Kingdom, installed Sudaipha in the throne. Sudaipha's reign witnessed the end of the ministerial dictatorship of Atan Burhagohain and rise of Laluksola Borphukan, the Ahom Viceroy of Guwahati and Lower Assam, as the real authority behind the throne. In order to gain absolute authority in the Royal Court, Laluksola Borphukan, treacherously surrendered the garrison of Guwahati to Mughals, and held Atan Burhagohain and other nobles as captive. Sudaipha's effort to reestablish his authority and bring the ambitious Laluk Sola Borphukan to justice for his treachery against his country and collaboration with the foreigners, finally led to his own deposition and execution by the ambitious minister.

== Ancestry and early life ==
Sudaipha belonged to the Parvatia line of Royal Ahom Dynasty. His early name was Khamcheo. He was the grandson of Parvatia Deka Raja, who was the son of Prince Sukrang, founder of Parvatia line of Royal Ahom Dynasty and grandson of Ahom king Suhungmung. During his early life as a prince, he was engaged in agricultural activities, living at his residence near Charaideo hills.

== Accession ==
In 1677 CE, conflict broke out between the reigning monarch Swargadeo Sujinpha and Atan Burhagohain, the Prime-Minister of Ahom kingdom. A civil war ensued between both sides, in which Atan Burhagohain emerged victoriously. The king was deposed and later executed. The nobles pressed Atan Burhagohain to assume sovereign power, but the Premier refused the offer stating that only members of Royal Ahom Dynasty, the direct descendant of first Ahom king Sukapha, were eligible for the throne. Also the Tai-Ahom priestly clans, the Deodhais, and the Bailongs, who considered themselves as the guardian of the throne, strongly opposed the elevation of any person of non-royal blood as the king. Therefore, the Premier instituted a vigorous search for a prince worthy of occupying the exalted office of a sovereign. He found prince Khamcheo suitable for the office of king and placed his proposal in front of the other nobles. The nobles consented with the choice of Atan Burhagohain and agreed to accept his nominee as the king. Khamcheo was brought from his residence at Charaideo hill and the nobles and other officers paid their homage to the new monarch. The coronation ceremony of the new king, the Singarigharutha ceremony, took place at Chunpora Nagar, in which the Tai-Ahom priest conferred him the Ahom name Sudaipha, while the Hindu priests conferred on him the title Tej Singha. He was commonly known as Parvatia Raja from the fact of his residence at Charaideo Parvat (literally in the Assamese language it means mountain or hill). On ascending the throne, Sudaipha performed the Rikkhvan ceremony, the Tai-Ahom ceremony for obtaining long life and offered sacrifices to Hindu god Shiva as well as to the Ahom gods.

== Reign ==
=== Rising influence of Atan Burhagohain ===
Sudaipha, soon after his elevation to the throne, married a number of wives from the families of his supporters in order to strengthen his political alliance with the bonds of family attachment. Atan Burhagohain's daughter became the Barkunwari; and Laluk Borphukan's daughter the second consort or Parvatia Kunwari. The king also married the daughters of Mecha Borbarua and Bhatdhara Phukan, and the sister of Betmela Phukan. Soon after the accession of Sudaipha the commanders of Guwahati, who had helped Atan Burhagohain in the deposition of previous monarch, Sujinpha left the capital for resuming, charge at their respective posts. They however placed 5000 men at the disposal of the Burhagohain to enable him to meet any eventual crisis. Meanwhile, Dighala Gohain, the surviving son of Sujinpha was finally caught at a monastery in Sologuri, by a royal officer named Tepartalia Ram Phukan. Dighala Gohain's eyeballs were extracted, and he died in consequence. Sudaipha expressed his gratefulness to Atan Burhagohain for having secured the throne for him, though the premier himself could have taken possession of it if he had so desired. The king gave valuable presents to the Burhagohain consisting of sedans, carpets, swords, golden trays and ornaments, elephants and horses, lands in Charaideo hill, and an estate in Dulung with eighty servitors. The monarch issued an order to the effect that the estates settled on Atan Burhagohain should be enjoyed in perpetuity by him and his descendants as long as members of Sudaipha's family remained in occupation of the Ahom throne. The wife of the Burhagohain was honoured by the monarch with the gifts of Kekora-dola, a sedan which could be used only by the king and the leading nobles.

=== Appointment of new officials ===
The assumption of office by the new monarch was followed by a partial overhauling of the official personnel which was carried out on the advice of Atan Burhagohain who naturally wanted to promote his adherents to power. The major changes were as follows:- Kola Patar was appointed Borpatrogohain in place of Ramcharan, dismissed from office; Japang Sen Gohain was appointed Borgohain in place of Laluk Guimela, dismissed; Mecha Rajkhowa, son of Rangachila Duara Phukan, was appointed Borbarua, in place of Kirkiria, transferred to Guwahati as Deka Phukan; Atan Burhagohain's elder brother was appointed Naobaicha Phukan in place of Mad-nokhowa; Dilihial Dighala Gohain was appointed Bhitarual Phukan. The following officers were appointed as Phukans: Betmela, son of Kalanchu; Phulbarua's son, Miri Sandikoi's son; and Bhatdhara at Guwahati.

=== Trouble in relations with the nobles ===
The relations between Swargadeo Sudaipha and Atan Burhagohain proceeded on a cordial basis for some time. But troubles began to emerge, disrupting relationship between the monarch and Atan Burhagohain. According to the custom of the Ahoms it was necessary for the Burhagohain, the Borgohain, and the Borpatrogohain to pay their homage to the new king and his chief consort by prostration repeated seven times. Sudaipha received the homage in due form, but when the Burhagohain and his two colleagues approached the seat of the Barkuanri or Chief Queen, who happened to be the daughter of Atan Burhagohain, she left her seat being unwilling to see her father kneeling down before her. The nobles then left the room there being no one in that place to receive their allegiance and homage.

The king took the Burhagohain to task, saying,-"The Dangarias paid their homage to me in the usual form; but why did they retire to their residences without kneeling down before the Barkonwari or Chief Queen? They have thus violated a significant and time honoured custom of the land. They have made me king because I am a descendant of the royal family. What am I here for if the Dangarias renounce the old customs of the country? Let them select any one as their overlord, and I shall retire to my village to live there as I did in the past." To this the Burhagohain replied,-"We have made him the dispenser of our bodies and of our minds, and we have knelt down before him accordingly. We went to pay our homage to the queen as required by the custom, but she left her seat on our approach. Whom are we to salute in an empty place? This has been our only transgression; otherwise we are not the men to relinquish the usages of the past. Let His Majesty appoint another day for the salutation ceremony, and we shall proceed accordingly to pay our homage."

Sudaipha rebuked the Chief Queen as well for the un-queenly demeanour shown by her in her unwillingness to receive the obeisance of her father; she was described by her royal consort as the daughter of "a king-making and king unmaking rebel". The king also gave vent to his suspicious about a possible move on the part of her father and his two henchmen, Ram Phukan and Betmela Phukan, to set up a new monarch. The queen reported the whole matter to her father, the Burhagohain, and he felt extremely mortified.

The Burhagohain then invented a double-edged device to get over the delicate situation. The Queen kept before her a raised tray on which was placed the sacred book Ratnavali and received her father's salutation in that position. The queen's filial conscience was eased by the thought that her father's obeisance had been paid to the sacred manuscript, and not herself; while the exacting monarch construed the salutation as being meant for his consort which thus removed his grievance against the Burhagohain.

But things does not seem to run smoothly for king Sudaipha as another trouble emerged, centering Mecha Borbarua. Mecha Borbarua had a number of wives from the royal family, first, the widowed Parvatia Kuanri or consort of king Ramdhwaj Singha. Then he married two other widowed queens. His own daughter who had been married to Sudaipha became a favourite of her husband in supersession of the other consorts. Proud of his royal connections Mecha began to show discourtesy to Atan Burhagohain. He never visited the premier's residence and ridiculed the nobles who paid court to Atan Burhagohain.

Being convinced of the habitual arrogance of Mecha the premier held consultations with Ram Phukan and Dighala Phukan, and dismissed him forthwith from his office, and appointed Chakrapani Tar-Sologuria Rajkhowa as Borbarua. The matter was reported to Swargadeo Sudaipha for approval. The king observed that the reference should have been made before the dismissal of Mecha and the appointment of Chakrapani as his successor. The monarch however was not willing to interfere with the new appointment as it was an accomplished fact. The king said,-"Now that the Gohain does not like Mecha he may be sent away to the village where he can live by ploughing his fields". Mecha was then ordered to go to his village in Dihing.

=== Murderous assault on the king ===
Despite few disputes, the relation between king Sudaipha and Prime-minister Atan Burhagohain was cordial. But some of the close associates of Atan Burhagohain were not happy at the behavior of the king. Previously, Sudaipha rebuked his Chief Queen or Barkuanri, who happened to be the daughter of Atan Burhagohain, as the daughter of "a king-making and king unmaking rebel". The queen accordingly had reported the matter to her father, the Burhagohain, who felt sad at the remarks of the king. Even though Atan Burhagohain forgive the king for his behavior, some of the close associates of Atan Burhagohain, prominently Tepartalia Ram Phukan and Betmela Bhitarual Phukan, became anxious at the king's remark on Burhagohain. They interpreted is as the opinion entertained by the king about the Premier and his adherents. The king, they thought, could at any time come upon them and caused their destruction and ruin. They blamed Atan Burhagohain for nominating princes who always prove hostile in the long run. Secret consultations were held between Ram Phukan and Betmela Phukan and the latter's son Chikan Tamuli. The Tamuli, who was a personal attendant of king Sudaipha, undertook to see to the annihilation of his royal master. The support of Betmela's sister who was a junior consort of the monarch was enlisted for the execution of the plan. The chronicles were mute as to whether Atan Burhagohain had been cognizant of or promoted this design.

As prearranged Chikan Tamuli entered the palace at night by crossing the earthen wall situated behind the rows of the rear apartments. He crawled into the king's bed-chamber, and put out the light. His aunt removed the cloth which covered the king's person and exposed it to the blows of the assassin. Chikan Tamuli then inflicted four blows on the body of the king with his axe-shaped dao, one on the head, another on the left arm, a third on the back, and a fourth on the palm of the right hand. The king had meanwhile woke up, and he raised his left hand to resist further blows, and lost the thumb in consequence. The inmates of the palace then got up from their sleep, and there ensued great uproar and commotion. The assassin had meanwhile escaped leaving the weapon in the king's bathroom.

Having heard of the attack Prime-Minister Atan Burhagohain and the Phukans tightened the watch in the palace, and engaged expert physicians to attend to the wounds which were rapidly healed, and Sudaipha soon returned to his normal health and disposition. Chikan Tamuli fled down to Guwahati during the course of the same night. The ministers questioned the monarch about the features of the assassin so that he might be identified and traced. The king was not able to give precise and full details as the attack had been made after the light had been extinguished. From what little he could see he described the man as being pockmarked and dark complexioned. The description fitted in with the Jadu Tamuli, an attendant of Mecha Ex-Borbarua; and Betmela Phukan confirmed the suspicions by pointing out that on the day before the assault the Phukan had seen Jadu Tamuli on the road, but the Tamuli avoided the contact by darting off into an adjoining lane, and that the Tamuli was an intimate friend of the principal door-keeper of the palace who was found missing. The Burhagohain and the nobles concluded that the assault had been engineered by the dismissed Borbarua and accordingly emissaries were sent to arrest his person. But the daughter of Mecha, who was a royal consort of the king, informed her father about the approaching danger. Mecha accordingly fled to Guwahati in a fishing boat, concealed in a pile of nets. At Guwahati, Mecha met his old friend Laluksola Borphukan and the other officers to whom he dilated the happenings at the Capital Garhgaon. The Phukans in their turn guaranteed full protection to Mecha.

Meanwhile, the emissaries dispatched to Dihing to capture Mecha came back with the report of the Ex-Borbarua's flight to Guwahati. It was represented by the nobles as a confirmation of Mecha's guilt to the king. An envoy, named Kalia Kataki was sent to Guwahati to bring up Mecha, but the Phukans stationed at Guwahati refused to part with him. They informed the king that the culprit would be found somewhere at the capital if the Ministers and officials instituted proper enquiry. Another messenger, Ramkrishna Kataki was sent to Guwahati to bring Mecha, with threats of severe punishment if his mission failed. The nobles of Guwahati reaffirmed their determination not to make over Mecha. The envoy, Ramkrishna Kataki sought refuge from the Phukans of Guwahati fearing punishment from Atan Burhagohain and the king for his failure, to which the Phukans agreed and detained him at Guwahati.

Back in the capital, Garhgaon, Atan Burhagohain and other nobles tried to convince Swargadeo Sudaipha about Mecha's involvement in his assassination attempt. The king, however, held that the attack could not have been made by men from Dihing without the connivance and support of confederates living at the capital, as the entrances to the palace were vigilantly guarded at night. Jadu Tamuli was found at the house of the principal door-keeper of the palace and both were arrested. They were then subjected to severe torture with a view to extort their confessions, but no incriminatory information came out of their lips. Atan Burhagohain and the other nobles sought permission from Swargadeo Sudaipha to execute Jadu Tamuli and other suspects, which Sudaipha had given much against his will, as he was still not determined regarding their involvement in his assassination attempt. Jadu Tamuli was beheaded with his brothers and relatives, along with the principal door-keeper and other guards for their negligence of duty.

=== Envoy from Jaintia ===
In accordance to the friendly relation that had existed between Assam and Jaintia Kingdom, the ruler of Jaintia sent his envoy, Bijoyram Kataki with presents and gifts to Swargadeo Sudaipha. The envoy was duly escorted to the capital, where he had communication with the king and the nobles in which he stated about the determination of Jaintia king to maintain the age-old friendly relation with the Swargadeo of Assam. Sudaipha, on his part sent gifts and presents for Jaintia king and handed it over to Bijoyram Kataki.

=== Mughal Prince Azam demands restoration of Guwahati ===
In the middle of 1676 CE, Raja Ram Singh I of Amber, had returned to Delhi being unsuccessful in his attempt to reoccupy Guwahati for Mughals, after his defeat in the Battle of Saraighat. Emperor Aurangzeb appointed his son Muhammad Azam or Sultan Azamtara as the Subedar of Bengal. One of the tasks imposed by Emperor Aurangzeb on Sultan Azamtara was the recovery of Guwahati which Ram Singh I had failed to achieve. On his way to Dhaka, the Mughal headquarters in Bengal, Prince Azam halted at Rajmahal with 100,000 horses and 300 elephants. Previously, Prince Azam had married Ramani or Nangchen Gabharu alias Rahmat Banu Begum, the daughter of Ahom king Swargadeo Jaydhwaj Singha, who happened to be the niece of Lachit Borphukan and Laluksola Borphukan. In September 1677 CE, he sent his envoy to Laluksola Borphukan demanding the restoration of Lower Assam and Guwahati to the Mughals. In his message to Laluksola Borphukan, he warned of dire consequence, in case of refusal by the Ahoms, giving reference to the number of horses and elephants in his army, an example of his military strength. As per official procedure, Laluksola Borphukan forwarded the message to Swargadeo Sudaipha and Prime-minister Atan Burhagohain. The demands of Mughal prince Azam was rejected along with a sharp reply from Prime-minister Atan Burhagohain which said-"The territories referred to by the Sultan do not belong to the Mughals. They were enjoyed by those on whom God is pleased to bestow them for the time being. The prince's claim is therefore unjust and improper, and has been made without much deliberation. He also made mention of horses and elephants in order to give us an impression of his military strength, but these animals do not deserve any mention whatsoever, for horses may be horses to him, but to us they are as useless as deer, for they cannot shoot arrows nor can they fire guns."

=== Laluk Sola Borphukan solicits foreign aids ===
The refusal of Laluksola Borphukan and the Phukans of Guwahati to hand over Mecha, who was accused of the assassination attempt on the king, soured the relationship between Atan Burhagohain and Laluksola Borphukan. The immediate adherents of Atan Burhagohain urged him to take action against the Borphukan, but Atan Burhagohain refused to sanction any strict action against Laluksola Borphukan as he feared a possible outbreak of war with the Mughals, as such he did not want to create any rift among the Ahoms in such a critical juncture. Meanwhile, in Guwahati, Mecha and Marangi Dolakasharia Barua, a brother of Laluksola Borphukan, reported the Borphukan about the high handed actions of Atan Burhagohain and his adherents. They informed Borphukan about the intentions of Atan Burhagohain and his adherents as hostile and pointed out the danger to the safety of Laluksola Borphukan. The Borphukan, after listening to these reports realized the necessity of making himself strong and powerful to thwart the designs of Atan Burhagohain and his adherents against him. He held secret consultation with his two brothers, Bhatdhara Phukan and Marangi Barua for their future course of action. They decided to seek Mughal aid in order to strengthen their position. Laluksola Borphukan dispatch messengers to Mughal prince Muhammad Azam, the Subedar of Bengal, through his uncle Baduli who had fled Assam and settled in Mughal Empire, due to his collaborations with Mughals against Ahom king Swargadeo Jaydhwaj Singha. In his letters, Laluksola Borphukan expressed his willingness to evacuate the garrison of Guwahati on the condition that the Mughals must install him as the king of Assam. Prince Azam, who was related to Laluksola Borphukan owing to his marriage to Borphukan's niece Ramani Gabharu or Rahmat Banu Begum, agreed to this proposal and replied,-"I have taken this solemn vow that I shall without fail make my Moma-sahur or maternal uncle-in-law the Borphukan King of Assam." He also promised to pay four lakhs rupees in return for the evacuation of the stronghold of Guwahati. Laluksola Borphukan kept his communications with the Mughals secret from his subordinate officers and outwardly expressed his concern among them about the ministerial dictatorship of Atan Burhagohain.

=== Chintamani Rampart ===
Despite Laluksola Borphukan's efforts to keep his collaboration with Mughals secret, some of his subordinate officers came to know about it. The Paniphukan or the Admiral of Ahom navy and Miri Sandikoi Phukan reported the matter to Atan Burhagohain. The Burhagohain realized the seriousness of the situation, but he did not want to create an alarm among the Ahom nobles. He therefore expressed his opinion diplomatically as follows-‘The Borphukan is a wise man; why should he act like this? The men who informed my agents at Saraighat must have spoken falsely.' Atan Burhagohain immediately held counsel with Swargadeo Sudaipha and said-‘The elder son of Duara Phukan has fled to Saraighat out of the fear in connection with the murderous assault on the King. I have also heard many rumours about the state of affairs there. If we slip from our stronghold at Guwahati and Samdhara, there is no other place to rest upon.' The Premier proposed to construct another line of fortification near the capital Garhgaon in the event of possible Mughal invasion. The proposed rampart was to touch Dighmuria village near the Brahmaputra river at one extremity and Murkata, Soraguri and Tulasijan near Gabharu Parvat or hill on the other. Swargadeo Sudaipha gave his approval to the proposed plan. The construction of the rampart proceeded in full swing during the early part of the year 1678 CE. The king named the rampart Laimati-garh but it became popularly known as Chintamani-garh. The fortification passed through some highly populated villages, due to which there were some discontent among the affected people, who had opposed the construction.

=== Surrender of Guwahati by Laluksola Borphukan to the Mughals ===
Meanwhile Laluksola Borphukan and other royal officers at Guwahati heard about the construction of Chintamani rampart. Laluksola Borphukan raised this issue to obtain support of other Phukans and Ahom nobles residing at Guwahati against Prime-minister Atan Burhagohain and said- ‘We are stationed at Guwahati always prepared to repel the attacks of our enemies. For whom then has the rampart been constructed in the heart of the kingdom? It must be meant for us.' The other Ahom Phukans and nobles supported Laluksola Borphukan and jointly decided to negotiate with the Mughals with the object of surrendering Guwahati to them. In the meantime the Laluksola Borphukan's messengers to Mughal prince Azam returned and reported their success in the mission. Prince Mohammad Azam Shah, in the meantime, obtained permission from his father Emperor Aurangzeb to invade Assam. He issued orders to Nawab Mansur Khan, the Faujdar of the Mughal outpost of Rangamati, a place near the frontier of Ahom Kingdom to proceed to Guwahati and take delivery of the fortification of Guwahati from Laluksola Borphukan. Nawab Mansur Khan was also accompanied by Baduli Phukan, the uncle of Laluksola Borphukan. Back in the capital Garhgaon, Atan Burhagohain got the information about the recent developments. Hiding his concern, he replied diplomatically - "It is well and good that I have been informed. If such a juncture actually takes place I shall myself go down to Guwahati as well as other men. Let anybody come, whether he be the Emperor or his son, why should we give up Guwahati?" He then dispatched the Khanikar Barua, the officer in charge of construction of buildings and bridges, to ascertain the facts. In the meantime, the Mughals conspiring with Laluksola Borphukan came as far as Agiathuti with a view to capture Guwahati. The Pani-phukan and the Miri-Sandhikai Phukan reported all the details of the situation to Atan Burhagohain through the Khanikar Barua, saying,-‘Nobody seemed to believe in us though we reported the matter so many times. Now, Baduli has actually come; let the Burhagohain now do what he can.' The Mughals under Mansur Khan and Baduli Phukan abstained from entering into Guwahati for three days suspecting that the Assamese might be hiding somewhere in the hills and come upon them unawares. Laluksola Borphukan then assured the Mughals by sending one of his messenger to persuade them to enter Guwahati without any hesitation. Mansur Khan and Baduli Phukan then sailed up to Guwahati and took possession of the town and its fort on 26 February 1679 CE. According to some historical records, Ramani Gabharu alias Rahmat Banu Begum, the consort of prince Muhammad Azam Shah, also the niece of Laluksola Borphukan, tried to stop her uncle from surrendering the fortification of Guwahati to the Mughals. In her message she indirectly hinted her uncle not to commit such heinous act of betrayal to his country. Baduli Phukan, the uncle of Laluksola Borphukan, who had long been associated with the Mughals, also criticized his nephew for betraying his own country and surrendering the strong fortifications at Guwahati to the Mughals.

=== Atan Burhagohain taken captive ===
After having evacuated Guwahati, Laluksola Borphukan sailed up towards Kaliabar, located in Nagaon District of Assam. He then sent report to Swargadeo Sudaipha about the entrance of the Mughals into Guwahati, obviously concealing the part he had played in the game. But Swargadeo Sudaipha and Atan Burhagohain got the information about the treachery of Laluksola Borphukan, from some of the Burhagohain's loyalist at Guwahati. Swargadeo Sudaipha immediately ordered the three Dangarias, the Burhagohain, the Borgohain and the Borpatrogohain to suspend work at Chintamani rampart and to march Guwahati instead at the head of an adequate force. Atan Burhagohain now face a complex twofold situation. While it was necessary to curb the treacherous activities of Laluksola Borphukan; it was still more imperative to oust the Mughals from Guwahati. The contingent sailed down the river, and halted at Biswanath, in present-day Sonitpur District for sometime in order to form an accurate estimate of the situation.

Meanwhile Laluksola Borphukan heard about the royal force stationed at Biswanath under the leadership of Atan Burhagohain. He realized that a direct attack on Burhagohain's forces would result in failure. Therefore, he devised a clever plan to weaken Burhagohain's forces. He sent a message to Atan Burhagohain advising him to stay at Biswanath and send up his subordinate Phukans to Kaliabar to join his forces in an attack upon the Mughals at Guwahati. Atan Burhagohain failed to detect the real motive of the wily Laluksola Borphukan. The expulsion of Mughals being the primary objective of the expedition of the Burhagohain, he readily compiled with the Borphukan's requisition and dispatched to his camp Govinda Phukan, Betmela Phukan and Tepartalia Ram Phukan together with their soldiers and provisions. When the three commanders arrived at the Borphukan's camp at Kaliabar, he took them inside on the pretext of having a conference and divested them of the soldiers under their commands. Tepartalia Ram Phukan, Betmela Phukan and Govinda Phukan were imprisoned at Duimunisila and later, they were beheaded in a village in Samdhara near Kaliabar.

When Atan Burhagohain heard about these developments at Kaliabar, he immediately ordered his troops to sail down the river towards Kaliabar. Laluksola Borphukan also similarly sailed up to encounter the royalist party. A fierce battle raged between both sides at Duimunisila in which Atan Burhagohain's forces were defeated and his principal adherents were captured. Atan Burhagohain tried to escaped to Naga hills by crossing the river Brahmaputra. But he was caught on his way, along with his elder brother, the Naobaicha Phukan. The two brothers were confined at Duimunisila and guards were posted to keep watch over them. Later the Borgohain and the Borpatrogohain were also taken captive by Laluksola Borphukan. Laluksola Borphukan then fixed his headquarters at Kaliabar, where he began to act in an independent manner totally ignoring the authority of king Sudaipha, appointing and dismissing officers at will.

=== Sudaipha assured by Laluksola Borphukan ===
After seizing the person Atan Burhagohain, Laluksola Borphukan and his supporters marched towards the capital Garhgaon. King Sudaipha was deeply alarmed and being afraid he fled to his ancestral village in Charaideo hills. He sent a message through Dulia Barua in which he said,-"I was earning my bread by ploughing land. They brought me here and gave me the title of a king. I do not know anything. If they want to do anything towards me let them come here and do it. They alone will share the sin or virtue as the case may be." Having received this message from the Dulia Barua at Chinatali, the Guwahati nobles, led by Laluksola Borphukan sent a reassuring reply to Sudaipha denying sinister intentions against him. They said,-"The Swargadeo is not justified in speaking to us in this way. The people have been subjected to unnecessary harassment by the construction of the rampart in the heart of the kingdom. We have captured the Burhagohain and have come up in quest of those who have revolted against His Majesty. It is significant that we have left Guwahati which resembles a casket of gold. What is the good of fighting with our external enemies if enemies inside the country are allowed to act as they choose? If we cannot settle up these matters, what is the good of our remaining at Guwahati, separated from our women and wives, and eating coarse rice in our meals? We have come to mete our punishment to the rebels, and to pay our respects to His Majesty." This reassuring message from the Guwahati nobles induced Sudaipha to return to Garhgaon.

Laluksola Borphukan proceeded to the capital and had an audience with the King. He explained the reason of evacuating the garrison of Guwahati due to dissatisfaction of the people against the maladministration of Atan Burhagohain and his adherents. He also blamed the Burhagohain of ignoring the authority of the king and wielding power at will. The king also gave his consent with the views of Laluksola Borphukan, describing his inability to take action against Atan Burhagohain. The Borphukan requested the monarch to pass death sentence on the Burhagohain, but other nobles interceded on behalf of the latter stating reasons that execution of Atan Burhagohain might cause discontent among the people. Meanwhile, Chikan Tamuli, the real culprit of the assassination attempt on the king was caught and executed. The aunt of Chikan Tamuli, who was a junior consort of Sudaipha and had assisted in the assassination attempt was also taken prisoner and put to death.

Laluksola Borphukan, after obtaining permission from the king, appointed his brother Marangi as Borbarua, his son Thokola as Dekaphukan, Dilihial Dighala Gohain-Phukan as Burhagohain, Mecha as Bhitarual Phukan and Ramdhan Tamuli as Naobaicha Phukan. In appreciation of the promises of loyalty and support made by Laluksola Borphukan and his colleagues, Swargadeo Sudaipha gave them rich presents, consisting of ornaments and cloths, whereupon they returned to Kaliabar to resume charge of their respective commands.

=== Embassy to Mughal Prince Azam in Bengal ===
Laluksola Borphukan advised king Sudaipha of sending an embassy to Dhaka offering the Swargadeo's felicitations to Mughal prince Muhammad Azam Shah, then Subedar of Bengal, who was in sense the son-in-law of the king of Assam as he had married late Ahom king, Swargadeo Jaydhwaj Singha's daughter Ramani Gabharu alias Rahmat Banu Begum. Accordingly, Sudaipha sent envoys, accompanied by epistles and presents, who left Garhgaon on 5 June 1679 CE. But the real motive of Laluksola Borphukan was different from what he had expressed in front of the monarch. He sent with the official envoys secret messages of his own reviving his claim for the kingship of Assam and accordingly seeks military aid from the Mughals for his purpose.

=== Sudaipha attempt to reassert his authority ===
The reconciliation between Swargadeo Sudaipha and Laluksola Borphukan transpired to be momentary and superficial as far as the monarch is concern. Even though, he allowed the Borphukan to leave Garhgaon with professions of friendship and good-will, but after his departure to Kaliabar the king instituted measures for the capture of Laluksola Borphukan, and for the rehabilitation of the government. Mecha Bhitarual Phukan, who had outwardly supported Laluksola Borphukan became confidant of the monarch. "Who is this man," exclaimed Sudaipha, "that he surrenders Guwahati to the Mughals, imprisons my Burhagohain and my Phukans, and dismisses and appoints my officers?" It was proposed to engage Kirkiria Phukan, brother of Mecha, to arrest Laluksola Borphukan. But Kirkiria Phukan expressed his inability to arrest the Borphukan by himself alone and seek assistance from the Capital. Sudaipha accordingly appointed the son of Garhgayan Sandikoi Phukan as Neog and sent him to Kaliabar with instruction to assist Kirkiria Phukan in capturing Laluksola Borphukan. Even then, Kirkiria Phukan could not muster his courage to arrest Laluksola Borphukan and express his inability to fulfill His Majesty's commands.

Back in the capital Garhgaon, Sudaipha began to crack down on the supporters of Laluksola Borphukan. He arrested Marangi Borbarua and Ramdhan Naobaicha Phukan. They were accused by Swargadeo Sudaipha as follows, "The beautiful land of Kamrup is my dominion, and it has been acquired by us with great difficulty and suffering. Under whose orders did you relinquish such a territory in favour of Mughals? Besides, who appointed you to these high offices? It appears that the slaves of Lukhurakhuns have become all in all, and I am nobody!" Marangi and Ramdhan were necked out of the court, and then chained with iron fetters and imprisoned in the Hatisal or Elephant stall. The king also sent men to arrest Dihingia Alun Khangia, but the latter came to know about it and escaped to Kaliabar, where he informed Laluksola Borphukan about the happenings at the capital. Meanwhile, Marangi also managed to escape to Kaliabar, where he informed his brother about the hostile attitude of the king. In order to confirm the King's hostile attitude towards Laluksola Borphukan and his adherents, Bhatdhara Phukan, another brother of Laluksola Borphukan, pretended to support the monarch against his own brother. He informed Sudaipha through a messenger named Ram Saraswati Kataki that he would capture his brother Laluksola Borphukan provided he would be appointed to the consequent vacancy in the office of Borphukan. Sudaipha failed to see through the hoax and made promise on the line of Bhatdhara's proposal. Bhatdhara communicated the whole matter to his brother Laluksola Borphukan who now became confirmed in his belief that the king was determined to effect his destruction.

== Overthrow and execution ==
Laluksola Borphukan and his colleagues marched towards Garhgaon to frustrate Sudaipha's attempts to arrest them. The Borphukan, meanwhile arrested Kirkiria Phukan for his collaboration with the king against him. Borphukan's forces fixed their camp at the Sakbari dockyward. Sudaipha opposed the insurgents in an armed conflict, but his soldiers were defeated with heavy casualties. Sudaipha took shelter in the palace.

The Guwahati Phukans and Rajkhowas, led by Borphukan stationed at Sakbari, decided to depose Swargadeo Sudaipha and Borphukan's brother Marangi was sent with a party of men to execute the decree. Marangi saluted Swargadeo Sudaipha with a golden tray in his hand, and said, "O, Swargadeo, please leave the throne." Sudaipha in his fury kicked the tray, and began to curse the Lukhurakhuns (the Ahom clan from which Laluksola Borphukan and his brothers hailed), describing them as a cabal engaged in the game of making and unmaking kings. He also hinted at the treacherous move of the Lukhurakhuns to seize the kingship of Assam, and he predicted their destruction as a punishment for their treachery. Sudaipha was forcefully deposed and placed as house-prisoner at the palace. The two close supporters of Sudaipha, Mecha and his brother Kirkiria were then blinded, and banished to a place called Nikari.

In October 1679, Prince Sarugohain of the Samuguria branch of Royal Ahom Dynasty, only 14 years old, was placed on the throne at Sakbari dockyard. The new king assumed the Ahom title Sulikpha, while the Hindu Brahmins conferred him the title Ratnadhwaj Singha. A few days later, the deposed monarch Sudaipha was taken to Charaideo hill for execution. On the eve of his approaching end, Sudaipha thrust into his mouth a morsel of rice and quickly spat it back, saying, "Let there be famine in the land as a punishment for this injustice and cruelty." He was then put to death by being made to drink poison. His two sons were also executed under the orders of the new king which was obviously inspired by Borphukan. The daughters of Mecha and Halwa who were the consorts of Swargadeo Sudaipha were also put to death.

== Legacy ==
The town of Boka was built during the reign of Sudaipha. The construction of a Sil Sako or a stone bridge is also mentioned but whereabouts is not known. Sudaipha was a disciple of Dakhinpat Satra or Vaishnavite Monastery and took the Satradhikar or head of the monastery, Banmali Gosain as his spiritual and religious mentor.

Sudaipha came to throne of the Ahom Kingdom in a troubled time, when the real power lies in the hands of the ministers, who often indulged in power struggle among them to obtain supremacy over each other and the kings became mere puppets at the hand of their ministers. Sudaipha's reign witnessed the intense power struggle between Prime-minister Atan Burhagohain and Laluksola Borphukan, in which the latter emerged victorious, but at the price of surrendering Lower Assam and Guwahati to the Mughals. Sudaipha, in spite of his weak position, never hesitated to voice his views and concerns in front of the ministers. One can observe how defiantly he proposed his resignation from his kingship, when he thought that the prime-minister Atan Burhagohain and other nobles broke the age-old customs by not bowing to his Chief Queen or Barkuanri. Regarding the treacherous conduct of Laluksola Borphukan, who surrendered Lower Assam and Guwahati in favour of Mughals for his own selfish purpose, Sudaipha, in spite of his weakness, had sense enough to realize the seriousness of the situation brought by the Borphukan's high-handedness and autocracy. His efforts to establish the royal authority over administration and to arrest the ambitious Laluksola Borphukan for his crime against the country, finally led to his own deposition and nemesis.
