= Gadadhar Singha =

Ahom king from 1681 to 1696

Gadadhar Singha Supatphaa
- Swargadeo
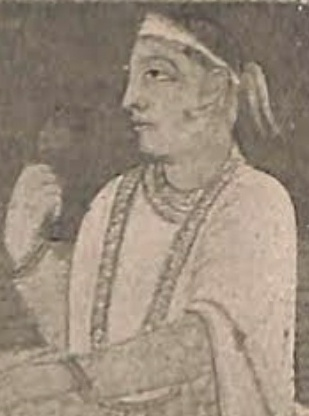

Ahom King
- Reign: 1681 – 28 February 1696
- Predecessor: Sulikpha
- Successor: Rudra Singha
- Born: Gadapani Konwar; Ahom kingdom
- Died: 28 February 1696; Ahom kingdom
- Wives: Joymoti Konwari; Dalimi
- Issue: Rudra Singha; Lechai Gohain
Names
- Burha Raja Sri Srimant Gaddadhar Singh Maharaja
- House: Tungkhungia
- Dynasty: Ahom dynasty
- Father: Gobar Roja
- Mother: Siddhiswari
- Religion: Ahom religion Shaktism

Gadadhar Singha (born Gadapani Konwar; died 28 February 1696), also known as Supatpha, was Ahom King from 1681 until his death in 1696.

He established the rule of Tungkhungia royal house of Ahom kings, whose descendants continued to rule till the climactic end of the Ahom kingdom in 1826. He was a son of Gobar raja, a descendant of Suhungmung, and who had become king for twenty days. Gadadhar Singha stabilized the Ahom kingdom, which was going through a long decade of political turmoil and instability. This period saw the ruthless power grab of Debera Borbarua and Laluksola Borphukan's abandonment of Guwahati to the hands of Mughals and oppression via Sulikpha alias Lora Roja.

Soon after his ascension to the throne, he retook Guwahati and permanently wrested out the Mughals from Assam following the Battle of Itakhuli and established a strong rule of 'blood and iron'. Later during his reign he came in conflict with the Vaisnavite Satras or monastery and persecuted them for a while. He died in 1696 and was succeeded by his son Rudra Singha.

== Kinship ==
Gadapani wielded the authority of a sovereign, and piloted the government through hazardous adventures. He was the son of a reigning monarch, Gobar Roja. The latter was the grandson of Swargadeo Suklenmung Gargayan Raja, who in his turn was the son of Suhungmung Dihingia Raja. By his presence, Gadapani commanded the respect of all who came near him. He was reputed for his stature, vigour, intelligence and valour. Stories are still current about the size of his rings, the richness of his diet, and his appetite. He is said to have strangled a wild buffalo into inaction by merely twisting its horns as it rushed to attack him.

== Reign ==
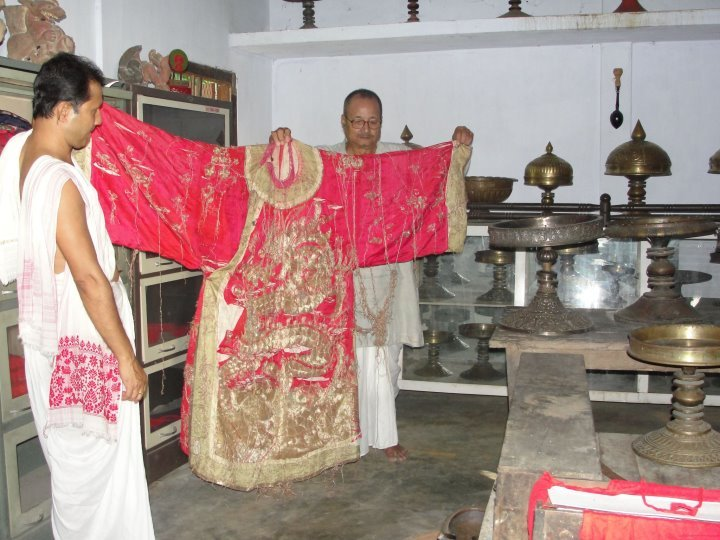
Royal Robe of Gadadhar Singha in Bengenaati Satra

Supatpha, known as Langi Gadapani konwar, was the son of Gobar Gohain who was made the king by Debera Borbarua in 1675. Gobar Raja was the king for only 20 days and was executed after the fall of Debera Borbarua at the hands of the forces of Atan Burhagohain. After Laluk Sola Borphukan had Atan Burhagohain murdered in 1679, he installed Sulikpha Lora Roja as the king and tried to become the de jure ruler of the Ahom kingdom. He began a campaign to target Ahom princes who were eligible for the throne. To escape this, Supatpha became a fugitive, hiding in the Naga hills. The area that Supatpha had fled, maybe somewhere near present-day Mon district is, that was inhabited by the Konyak Naga. During this time his wife Joymoti Konwari, was tortured and killed by the henchmen of Sulikpha and Laluk Sola Borphukan. The first act of the reign of Gadadhar Singha was the stamping out of the possibilities of disloyal manoeuvres on the part of the nobles. In March 1682, Gadadhar Singha was formally crowned. The Majumdar Barua wrote his name with a golden pen and announced it to the public. The king married the daughters of the leading nobles, and thereby established friendly alliances with them.

== Years in exile ==
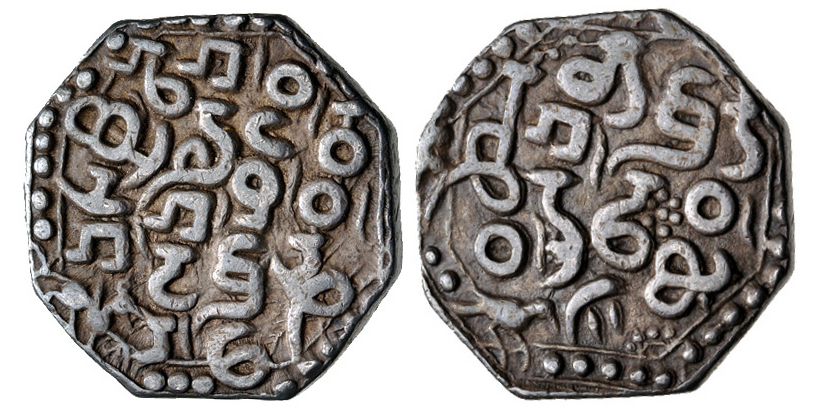
Coinage of Gadadhara Simha (1681–1696), Ahom Kingdom.

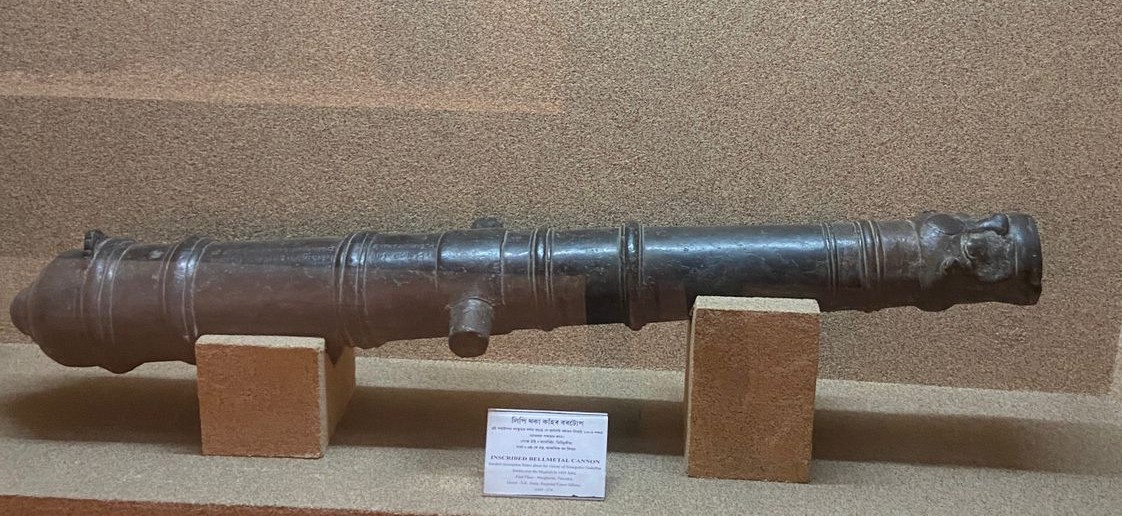
Cannon captured from the Mughals in the Battle of Itakhuli

Supatpha's stay in the Naga Hills is shrouded in mystery, for not much is known about the 2 years in exile. However, the hills abound with various lores, folktales, and legends about Supatpha. The physical attributes of Supatpha were very robust, charming and very handsome. According to one legend Supatpha, after the death of his wife Jaimoti, he was heartbroken and had, become very brooding. It was during this time that his well-wishers, in fact, married him a Konyak girl Watling. Sadly though, Watling while coming down with Supatpha from Konyak territory, died at a place named Naginimora while delivering a child. During his time in exile, his Naga friends had got him married to a very beautiful girl Zinyu. Noted Historian and Litterateur Padmanath Gohain Baruah first characterized a Naga girl Dalimi, in his play Joymati. It was shown that it was this girl that Supatpha had come into contact while he was in exile. Rup Konwar Jyoti Prasad Agarwala's First Assamese Film also showed Dalimi, as a daughter of Naga chieftain who had fallen for the charms of Supatpha.

=== Political and Personal/Military ===
At the time of Supatpha's accession to the throne, the Ahom kingdom was being sapped by internal dissensions, and patriotic feeling had become so weakened that many deserted to the Mughal side, who had re-occupied Gauhati, and were gradually pushing their frontier eastwards. The hill tribes too became emboldened and raided villages in the plains. Before he died he had quelled all internal disputes, revived the waning national spirit, driven the Mughals beyond Manas and, by prompt punitive measures, put a stop to the raiding and restored the prestige of the Ahoms among the turbulent tribes on the frontier.

His first act after becoming the King was to equip an army to oust the Mughal from Gauhati. He appears to have met with very little opposition. The forts at Bansbari and Kajali fell at the first assault, and a great naval victory was gained near the mouth of Bar Nadi, the whole enemy fleet falling into the hands of Ahoms. In 1682 Supatpha waged the Itakhulir Rann Battle of Itakhuli and captured Guwahati back from the Mughals and brought an end to the eighty years of Ahom-Mughal conflicts. The Fauzdar of Guwahati fled and the Ahom army pursued the Mughals as far as Manas river. A vast amount of booty was taken in Guwahati, including gold and silver; elephants, horses, and buffaloes, cannon of all sizes and guns, swords and spears. This was the last war with the Mughals. Henceforth both sides accepted the Manas as the boundary.

The Nagas often raided the Assamese villages in the border areas. He forged matrimonial alliances with the Nagas and assured peace and tranquility at the border areas. He married the beautiful daughter of the warlike Nokpu (Ao) warrior Assiring, Sentishila, renamed as Dalimi. And renamed the Asheimba- Yimuba gate as Assiringia Duar and granted a piece of land amounting to thousands of bighas as Assiringia Khat (present-day Naginijan Tea estate, under Assam Tea Corporation) near Nakachari in Jorhat district of ASSAM, scarves and shawls made of silk, steel doors, Ahom hats (Japees) gold and diamond ornaments and a muzzle-loading gun, to his father in law, Assiring, thus ensuring good matrimonial relations with the Aos, apart from his Konyak kinsman.

=== Administrative ===
Supatpha was keenly alive to the importance of public works. He built the Dhodar Ali a 211 km. the long road from Kamargaon to Joypur touching Mariani using the lazy (dhod means lazy in Assamese) opium addicts, Aka Ali and many other roads. Two stone bridges were built and a number of tanks were evacuated. The earliest known copper-plate grant recording grants of land by Ahom Kings to Brahmins or Hindu temples, date from his reign. He also circulated the use of silver coins carved with Ahom language, during his decade long reign from 1681 to 1696.

Administrative work of Gaddahar Singha were-Maibelar Dol, Lankuri Dol, Bashistha-Ashramar Dol, Rohdoir Dol, Umanandar Dol, Thaora Dol, Bhogdoi Pukhuri, Rohdoi hkhuri, Bauli Pukhuri, Mitha hkhuri, Borkolar Pukhuri, Joha Pukhuri, Thaora Pukhuri, Shukan Pukhuri, Aghoni Pukhuri, Panibil Pukhuri, Achubulia Pukhuri, Dhodar Ali, Ramani Ali, Barbarua Ali, Halau Phukanar Ali, Khara Garh, Rohdoi Ali, Akar Ali, two Stone-bridges.

A noteworthy measure of this monarch was the commencement of a detailed survey of the country. Supatpha became acquainted with the land measurement system of Mughals during the time he was hiding in Lower Assam before he succeeded to the throne. As soon as the wars were over he issued orders for the introduction of a similar system throughout his dominions. Surveyors were imported from Koch Bihar and Bengal for the work. It was commenced in Sivasagar and was pushed on vigorously, but it was not completed until after his death. According to historians, the method of survey included measuring the four sides of each field with a nal, or bamboo pole of 12 feet (3.7 m) length and calculating the area, the unit was the "pura" or 144 square feet (13.4 m^{2}) and 14,400 sq ft (1,340 m^{2}). is one "Bigha". A similar land measurement system is still being followed in modern Assam-- 144 sq ft (13.4 m^{2}). is one Lecha, 20 Lecha or 2,880 sq ft (268 m^{2}). is one "Katha", and 5 Katha or 14,400 sq ft (1,340 m^{2}). is one Bigha.

== Death ==
Supatpha died in February 1696, after a reign of fourteen and a half years. He left two sons, Lai and Lechai, and his elder son Lai succeeded him. Under Lai, who took the name Sukhrungpha (Hindu name Rudra Singha), the Ahom kingdom reached its zenith. The royal robes of Chow Pha Supatpha made of gold and a gold umbrella are preserved in the Bengenaati Satra of Majuli, Assam.

=== Death bed injunction ===
The following advice, which he gave to his elder son at his death-bed: "Do not appoint persons of low social ranks in high offices. Do not trust persons with foreheads smeared with horizontal lines. Do not entertain courtiers with female-dancers dancing to tune of drums"

== Brown's note on Supatpha's tomb ==
Reverend Nathan Brown of the American Baptist Mission, referring to the opening up of the tombs of Ahom kings in Charaideo, wrote:

"The tomb of King Supatpha at Charaideo, as nearly as we could calculate without instruments, was ninety feet high, and so natural in its appearance that a stranger would scarcely have suspected it to be anything more than an ordinary hill...Thirteen of these royal tombs were dug open during my residence in Assam, and I was told in the flowery language of the country, that when King Supatpha's tomb was opened 'the backs of three elephants were broken with the weight of the treasures it contained', meaning simply that three elephants were well loaded down."
