= Lachit Borphukan =

Ahom commander (1622–1672)

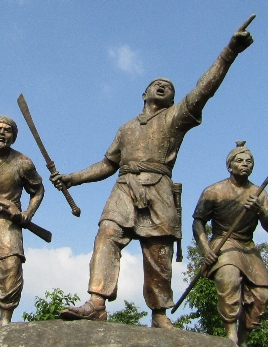
- Statue of Lachit Borphukan (centre) in Sivasagar, Assam.
- Born: 24 November 1622; Sivasagar
- Died: 25 April 1672 (aged 49); Kaliabor, Nagaon
- Burial place: Lachit Borphukan’s Maidam, Holongapar, Jorhat, Assam, India
- Relatives: Momai Tamuli Borbarua (father); Nang La-Cheng Aaideu (mother); Laluksola Borphukan (brother); Pakhori Gabharu (sister); Marangi Borbarua (brother); Bhardhora Borphukan (brother); Lao Deka (brother); Datukaria (brother); Ramani Gabharu (niece); Baduli Borphukan (uncle)
- Military career
- Allegiance: Ahom Kingdom
- Branch: Ahom Army
- Rank: Borphukan (General); Commander-in-chief
- Conflicts: Ahom–Mughal conflicts; Battle of Alaboi (1669); Battle of Saraighat (1671)
- Memorials: Holongapar, Jorhat, Assam, India

Lachit Borphukan (24 November 1622 – 25 April 1672) was an army general, primarily known for commanding the Ahom Army and the victory in the naval Battle of Saraighat (1671) that thwarted an invasion by the vastly superior Mughal Forces under the command of Mirza Raja Ram Singh I. He died about a year later in April 1672.

There is keen contemporary interest in Lachit Borphukan today—he has emerged as a powerful symbol of Assam's historical autonomy.

== Biography ==
Lachit was youngest born to Momai Tamuli Borbarua, a commoner who rose to the rank of Borbarua under Pratap Singha and Nang Lacheng Aaideu (r. 1545–1641). His sister was Pakhari Gabhoru, a queen to the Ahom kings Jayadhwaj Singha and Chakradhwaj Singha, and his niece was Ramani Gabharu, the Ahom princess who was given to the Mughals as part of the Treaty of Ghilajharighat. A few Buranjis give some details on Lachit's life and education. (Note: PAB: Purani Asam Buranji, ed., Hem Chandra Goswami; SMAB: Assam Buranji obtained from the family of Sukumar Mahanta; BKK: Tai-Ahom Buranji from Khunlung and Khunlai; AB: Ahom Buranji, tr., G. C. Barua; TB: Tungkhungia Buranji, ed., S.K. Bhuyan; Lachit: Lachit Barphukan and His Times by S. K. Bhuyan) He learnt the art of statecraft from his father and grew up instilled with a sense of loyalty to the king.

He is said to have participated in battle against Mir Jumla's forces at Dikhaumukh and rose up the ranks of Ahom officialdom—Ghora Barua, Dulia Barua, Simalugiria Phukan and Dolakasharia Barua. Following the Chakradhwaj's preparations to retake Guwahati and on the eve of the march, Lachit was appointed the Borphukan (Ahom viceroy in the west) and the commander of the Ahom forces. As Borphukan, he worked to develop Lower Assam by organising new villages, instituting crafts classes for women and taking a census of the population. During this time, he received a letter mistakenly from Kachar addressing him as the King of Lower Assam (Narayan Raja), to which he took offence.

=== Guwahati campaign ===
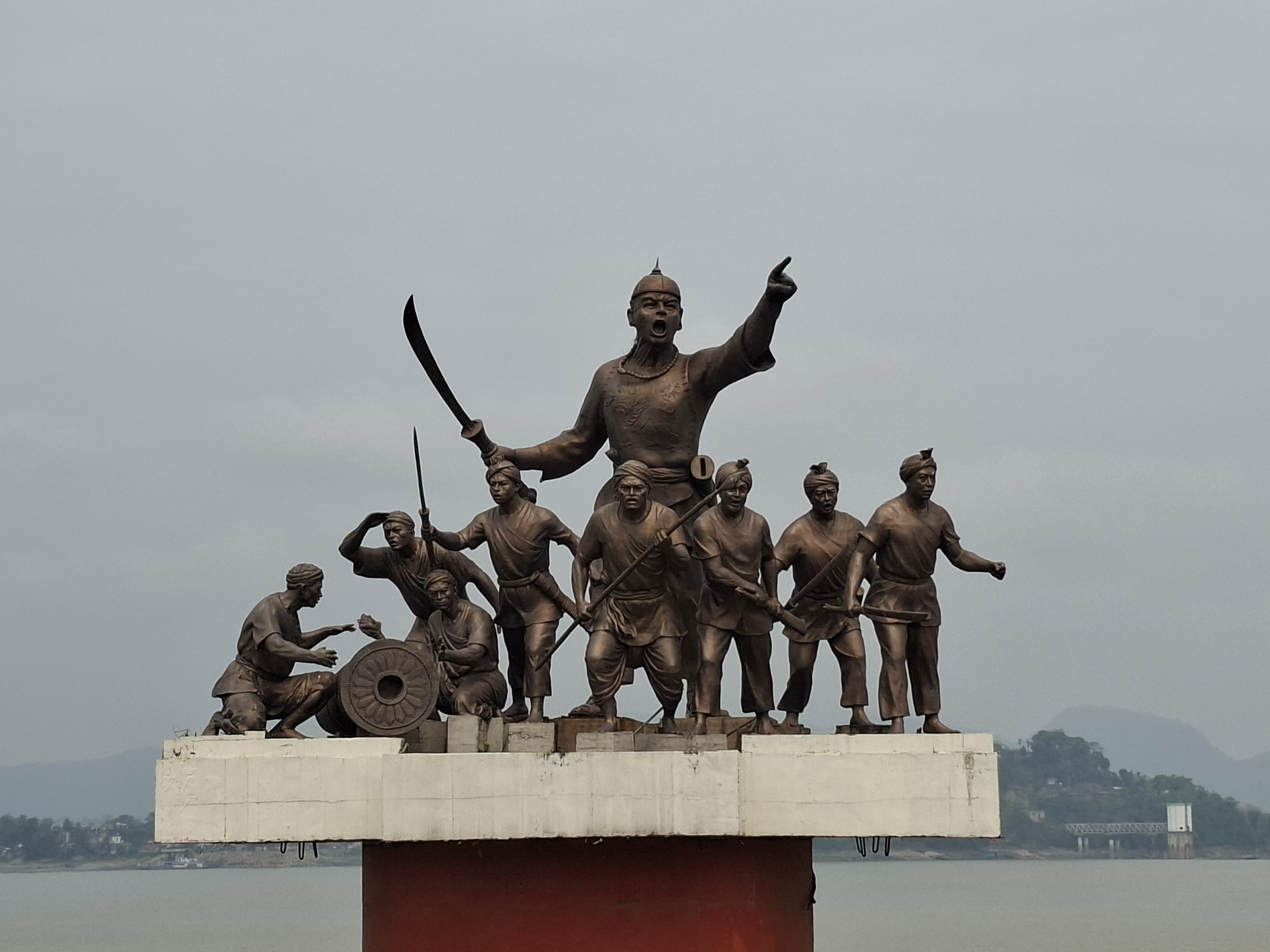
Statue of Lachit Barphukan in Guwahati

Lachit set up his base-camp at Kaliabar and then advanced on Guwahati in August 1667 in two divisions; and after a series of battles, finally retook Guwahati with the fall of Itakhuli in November 1667.

=== Death ===
Lachit Barphukan's maidam at Hoolungapara, Jorhat.

A few Buranjis briefly describe Lachit's victory over the Mughal naval fleet, led by Ram Singh, in the Battle of Saraighat. He died soon after in Kaliabor and was buried at Teok in Jorhat in a maidam, which are burial grounds for Ahom royals and nobles.

== Contemporary narratives ==
In the pre-colonial times Buranjis were not available for popular consumption and their circulation was restricted to the nobility. Beginning in the early twentieth century, a few localities in Upper Assam began commemorating November 24 as Lachit Dibox (trans. Lachit Day). The contemporaneous burgeoning of public interest in history ensured that the legend of Barphukan had "attained an iconic status" by the first quarter of the century and Surya Kumar Bhuyan published an article comparing him with Shivaji; but Lachit was only one of the many historical icons who were appropriated by Assamese elites towards different politico-cultural ends, and his popularity was later surpassed by Joymoti Konwari and others.

In 1947, Bhuyan published Lachit's biography "Lachit Barphukan and His Times" against the backdrop of Ahom conflicts with the Mughal Empire; not only did the work grant a veneer of "academic respectability" to the legend but also "mythologized" his exploits in the Assamese psyche. However, in state-building in postcolonial Assam, cultural heroes like Lachit were largely displaced by anti-colonial activists; Jayeeta Sharma notes the legend of Lachit to have "retired into the domain of knowledge, away from activism." (Note: The Government of Assam's only attempt at institutionalizing Barphukan's memory was probably in the naming of the Saraighat Bridge in 1962.) Nonetheless, the legend survived in the backwaters of Assamese nationalism, with the United Liberation Front of Asom (ULFA) — a secessionist organization seeking the creation of an independent and sovereign Assam — extensively using Lachit's imagery for propaganda. (Note: In 1968, ULFA established the Lachit Sena (Lachit Army) to drive away all foreigners but to no effect. A couple of decades hence, Suresh Phukan wrote Moidamor Pora Moi Lachite Koiso (trans. This is Lachit speaking from my burial tomb) which exerted significant influence on ULFA cadres and sympathizers; it had Barphukan, in the narrator's robe, admonishing Assam's political class for betraying the interests of the native people and commending the separatist cause.)

Lachit's memory would be significantly appropriated by the state only under the governorship of Srinivas Kumar Sinha; (Note: Sinha started the annual "Lachit Barphukan Memorial Lecture" at Gauhati University in 1998 and lobbied the Ministry of Defense to confer the best passing out cadet from the National Defence Academy with an eponymous medal; probationary IAS cadres from the state were required to enact Lachit defeating the Mughals.) Sharma, writing as of 2004, found that it was no more the ULFA but the Government of Assam that tried the most to bring him into prominence. Coterminous to the rise of Bharatiya Janata Party in the state, Lachit has been inducted within the framework of a Hindu Nationalist grammar, as a Hindu military hero.

The government of Assam reportedly approached Aditya Dhar to direct a biographical film about Lachit Borphukan.

== Bibliography ==
- Baruah, Sanjib (2020). In the Name of the Nation: India and Its Northeast. Stanford University Press.
- Bhuyan, S K (1935). "Lachit Barphukan: A great Assamese Contemporary of Shivaji Maharaja, and the successful antagonist of the Mogul General Raja Ram Singha of Amber". Proceedings of the Indian History Congress. 1 Part II: 2–3. JSTOR 44202311.
- Gohain, Birendra Kumar (October 2012). Lachit Barphukan: The National Hero of Assam. Guwahati: Asama Prakāśana Parishada. pp. 1–8.
- Saikia, Arupjyoti (December 2008). "History, buranjis and nation: Suryya Kumar Bhuyan's histories in twentieth-century Assam". The Indian Economic & Social History Review. 45 (4): 473–507. doi:10.1177/001946460804500401. ISSN 0019-4646.
- Sarkar, J. N. (1992), "Chapter VIII Assam-Mughal Relations", in Barpujari, H. K. (ed.), The Comprehensive History of Assam, vol. 2, Guwahati: Assam Publication Board, pp. 148–256
- Sharma, Jayeeta (2004). "Heroes for our Times: Assam's Lachit, India's Missile Man". In Zavos, John; Wyatt, Andrew; Hewitt, Vernon (eds.). The Politics of Cultural Mobilization in India. Delhi: Oxford University Press. ISBN 9780195668018.
- Zaman, Rokibuz (2022). "Why Assamese historians and writers are protesting against the BJP's celebration of Lachit Borphukan". Scroll.in. Archived from the original on 23 January 2023.
