= Kachar =

Community found in the state of Rajasthan in India

The Kachar is a community found in the state of Rajasthan, India. They are also known as Kachera or Shishgar.
