= Laluksola Borphukan =

Borbarua of the Ahom Kingdom from 1672 to 1677

Phu kon Lung Laluksola Borphukan

Borphukan of the Ahom Kingdom
- In office 1672–1677
- Monarchs: Ramadhwaj Singha aka Suklamphaa; Chaophaa Khamjamg; Suhung; Gobar Roja; Sujinphaa; Sudoiphaa
- Preceded by: Lachit Borphukan
- Succeeded by: Bhardhora Borphukan

Personal details
- Born: Ahom Kingdom
- Died: 1680, Meteka
- Children: Phupit; Tholoka; Angora; Jogora
- Parent: Momai Tamuli Borbarua (father)
- Relatives: Lachit Borphukan (brother); Bhardhora Borphukan (brother); Marangi Borbarua (brother); Lao Deka (brother); Datukari (brother); Pakhori Gabharu (sister); Ramani Gabharu (niece); Baduli Borphukan (uncle)

Laluksola Borphukan (fl. 1672–1680) also Laluk Nimati Phukan was of Lan Phima family and was son of Momai Tamuli Borborua and elder brother of Lachit Borphukan succeeded to the seat of Borphukan after demise of his younger brother Lachit, Laluksola Borphukan, who abandoned Guwahati. He was appointed the Borphukan by Udayaditya Singha after the death of his younger brother and predecessor, Lachit Borphukan, in 1672. He was posted as Naoboisa Phukan during the time of the Battle of Saraighat. His brothers were Bhardhora Borphukan, Marangi Borbarua, Lao deka, Lachit Borphukan and Datukaria and sister was Ahalya gabharu or Pakhori Gabharu. He was assassinated by his bodyguard while he was asleep.
