= Borphukan =

Patra Mantri in Ahom Kingdom

Borphukan (Ahom language: Phu-Kan-Lung) was one of the five patra mantris (councillors) in the Ahom kingdom, a position that was created by the Ahom king Prataap Singha. The position included both executive and judicial powers, with jurisdiction of the Ahom kingdom west of Kaliabor River. The headquarters of Borphukan was based in Kaliabor and after the Battle of Itakhuli in 1681 in Itakhuli in Guwahati. This position was particularly important and powerful because of its distance from the Ahom capital, giving it a semblance of independence. The region to the east of Kaliabor was governed by the Borbarua. Lachit Deka later became Borphukan or the ruler of Lower Assam according to the fifth chronicles of the Satsori Asom Buranji.

Originally the jurisdiction of this office was the region between the Brahmaputra River and its branch Kolong with the headquarters at Kajali and Kaliabor. After the Ahom consolidated its power following the Battle of Itakhuli in 1681 region from the Manas River in the west to Kaliabor in the east became its domain with the headquarters at Guwahati. The Phukans subordinate to the Borphukan helped him in the military administration of this vast territory: the Dihingiya and the Chetiya Phukans south of the Brahmaputra and Pani, Deka, and (as required) Chetiya Phukans in the north bank. The Bujarbarua assisted the Borphukan in the civil administration of Kamrup region, and the kayasthas in the Borphukan's domain were placed under the Borkayastha Barua.

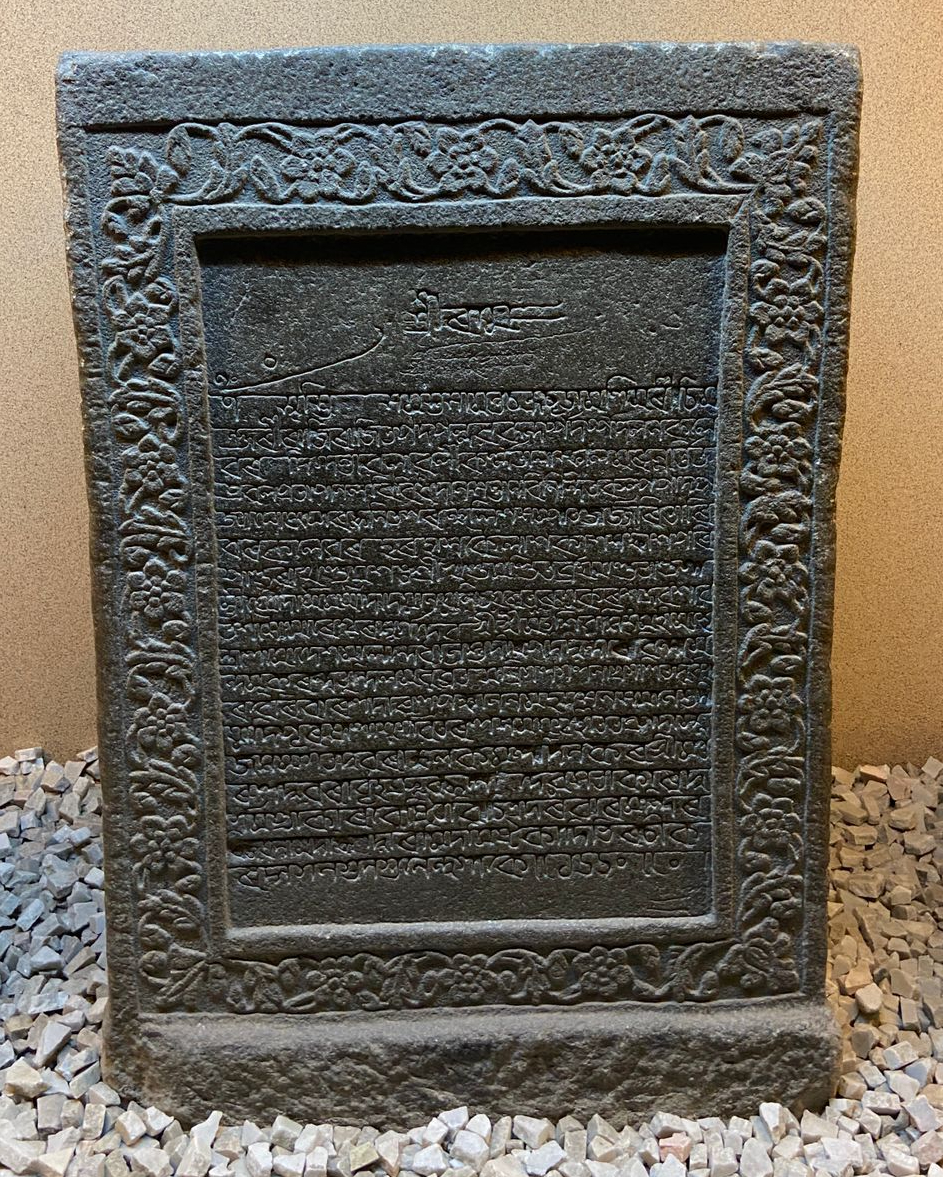
Borphukan's court Stone Inscription at Jaya Duar, constructed during the reign of Tarun Duara Borphukan in 1738 AD

The Borphukan was also responsible for maintaining diplomatic relationships with the ruling houses in Bengal and Bhutan, and according to protocol any ambassador from these regions had to first report to him. He also had jurisdiction over the dependent kings of Darrang, Beltola, Rani, Luki, and Dimarua besides the Duaria rajas of the south—Panbari, Barduar, Chhaygaon, Pantan, Boko, Bangaon, Vagai, Bholagaon and Mairapur.

The Borphukan's residence was situated in the present Fancy Bazaar area of Guwahati. The Borphukan's council was similar to the council-hall (Bor-Chora) at the capital and consisted of six Phukans collectively called the Guwahatiya or Dopdariya Phukan. The Borphukan Bor-Chora or the Durbar Hall was situated near the present Sonaram High School and site occupied by the Bharalumukh Thana. Two finely chiseled and inscribed rectangular blocks of stone have been found in the premises of the Kamrupa Anusandhan Samiti, currently the Assam State Museum. The texts engraved with borders of which are ornamented by creepers. These inscribed stones were posted at the southern and northern entrances to the council hall. We learn from the inscriptions that the two gates were known respectively as Bijay-Duar and Jay-Duar were constructed in 1660 Saka (1738) by Tarun Duara Borphukan under the orders of King Siva Singha. The Borphukan was assisted in administration by the Majindar Baruah (equivalent to a private secretary) whose residence was at the current Deputy Commissioner's residence.

== Council ==
The Borphukan's council (Dopdar) had a number of Phukans, in a manner equivalent to the Borbarua's council (Bor-chora), and the Phukans at the Borphukan's council were called Dopdariya Phukans. Each Phukan was responsible for receiving the royal revenue (in cash, kind, and services) from the subjects (paiks) and was also responsible for maintaining the guilds of specific professions (khels). The Dopdar, the Borphukan's council house, was situated about 300 yards west of the Bharalu stream.

Pani Phukan
The commander of the Ahom navy in Lower Assam, he was subordinate to the Naoboicha Phukan in the Borbarua's council. He had his seat at the Pani chokey as Ashwakranta and led a six-thousand strong militia, and received the service of 30 personal paiks.
Bhatiyal Dihingiya Phukan
This Phukan was responsible for the Dihing territory; and there was a corresponding office in the Borbarua's council, called Ujaniya Dihingiya Phukan. These phukans commanded four thousand paiks and received the service of 30 personal paiks.
Dopdaria Deka Phukan
The Deka Phukan commanded a 6000-strong group of select paiks and helped the Borbarua in his judicial work.
Dopdaria Neog Phukan
The Neog Phukan commanded a 6000-strong group of ordinary paiks (soldiers) and their commanders (Neogs). He helped the Borbarua in judicial work, managed the messengers (katakis) and received the services of 30 personal paiks.
Chetia Phukans (2)
There were two Chetia Phukans under the Borphukan: one stationed at Kaliabor (Kaliaboriya Chetia Phukan) and the other at the Dopdar (Guwahatiya Chetia Phukan) and each was responsible for professional guilds (khel) associated with arwans and litters.

== List of Borphukans ==
- Langi Panisiya Borphukan
- Lan Mung Shen Borphukan
- Chiring Piksai Borphukan
- Domai Deka Borphukan
- Langi Borphukan
- Piksai Borphukan
- Chengmun Borphukan (Ujoniyal Raja-Sahur)
- Ghargayan Raja Sahur Baduli Borphukan (Lan Phima Luk kha Khun)
- Pelan Borphukan (Ghora Konwar)
- Lachit Borphukan (Lan Phima Lakhurakhun clan)
- Laluksola Borphukan (Lan Phima Lakhurakhun clan)
- Bhardhora Borphukan (Lan Phima Lakhurakhun clan)
- Bandar Borphukan (Lanmakharu clan)
- Niranjan Borphukan Handikoi
- Vijaya Borphukan of (Tarun Duara Borphukan family)
- Debera Borphuakn of (Pani Dihingia family)
- Gadadhara Deka Duara, son of Vijaya
- Dashratha alias Bahikowa Borphukan, son of Deka Duara
- Lahon Borphukan
- Kashi Dihingia Borphukan
- Harnath Duara Borphukan (Rangachila Duarah)
- Gogoi Borphukan
- Medhi Borphukan
- Sivanath Borphukan
- Burha Chetia Borphukan
- Ghinai Badan Chandra Borphukan (Rangachila Duarah)
- General Kolia Bhomora Borphukan
- Ghinai Badanchandra Borphukan (Rangachila Duarah)
- Dihingia Ghanashayam Borphukan
- Janmi Borphukan (Rangachila Duarah)
- Piyoli Phukan Borphukan
- Lambodar Borphukan (Lanmakharu clan)
