= Momai Tamuli Borborua =

Ahom noble and statesman (1590–1633)

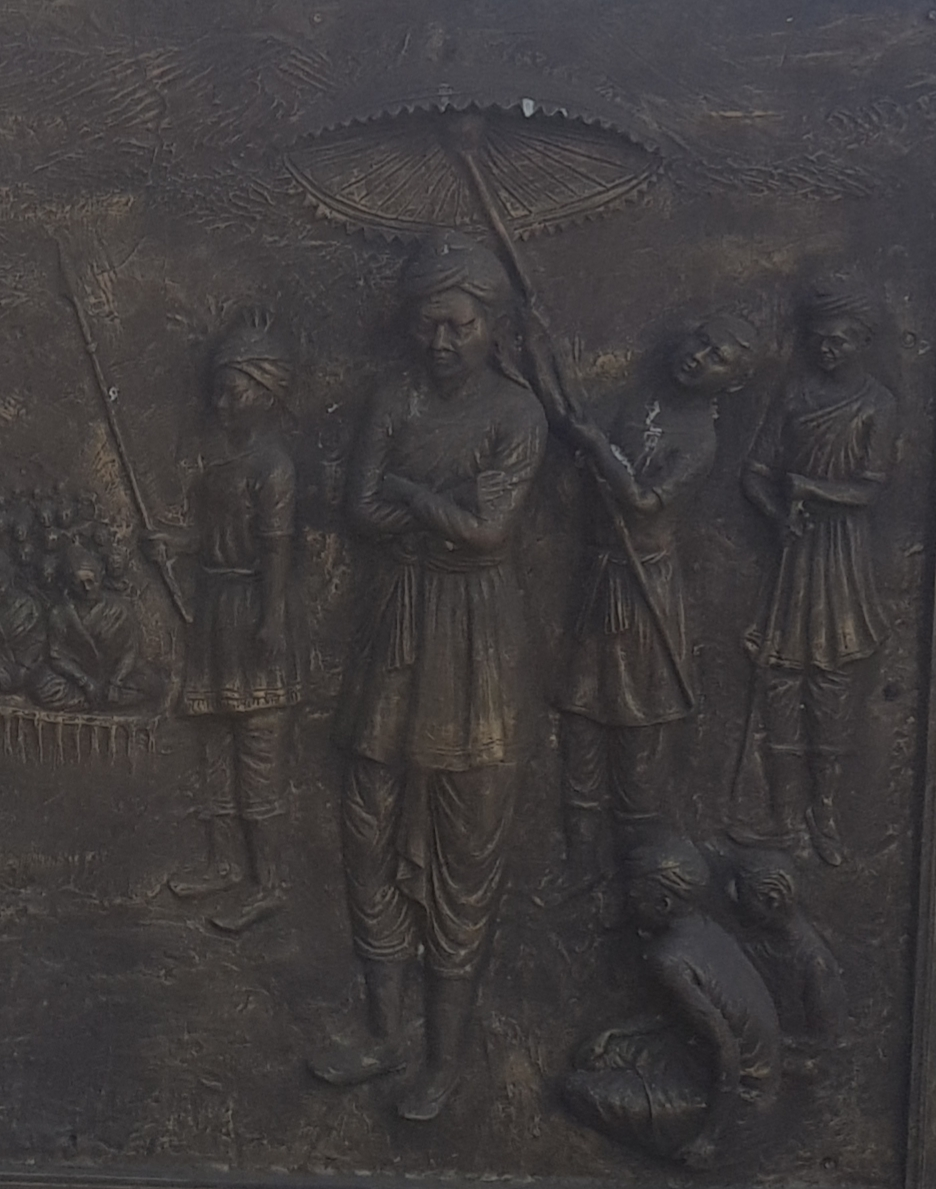
- Momai Tamuli Borbarua
- Died: 1663
- Children: Lachit Borphukan; Laluksola Borphukan; Bhardhora Borphukan; Lao Deka; Marangi Borbarua; Aka Phukan; Kadi; Pakhori Gabharu
- Military career
- Allegiance: Ahom kingdom
- Branch: Ahom Army
- Service years: 1609-1650
- Rank: Borbarua
- Conflicts: Battle of Duimunsila; Treaty of Asurar Ali

Momai Tamuli Borborua (1590–1663) also known by his other names Chiring Phiseng and Sukuti Tamuly was an Ahom general, statesman, and noble and the first incumbent to the office of the Borbarua. He is popularly known for systemizing the paik system and for being the father of famous Ahom general Lachit Borphukan.

== Biography ==
He was born in a small family of Garhgaon. Momai Tamuly rose out of humble origins, working as a gardener, Impressed by his performance as a gardener, Ahom king Pratap Singha appointed him as Borbauah. He continued to serve under various royal offices till he was promoted to the office of Borbarua.

Under the support of Pratap Singha, Momai Tamuly Borbaura systemized the paik system in 1609, which was the machinery of the Ahom state, and established model villages. In the paik system every adult male between the age group (15–50) had to compulsory had to render his service for the state. Momai Tamuly made it compulsory for every adult to make a bamboo basket and to spin a certain quantity of thread.

=== Mughal affairs ===
In 1638, Momai Tamuly commanded the Ahom forces against the Mughals, and in the battle of Duimunsila, the Mughals suffered a huge setback and they retreated back to Guwahati. Nevertheless, the long protracted wars between both had depleted the state resources and manpower of both the governments came to the conclusion of a pacific settlement. And in 1639, Momai Tamuly Borbarua concluded the Treaty of Asurar Ali with Mughal commander Allah yar Khan, which fixed the boundary between the both at Barnadi on the north bank and Asurar Ali on the south bank of Brahmaputra. The period following the treaty is marked by diplomatic correspondence between Assamese chief secretary Momai Tamuly and Mughal faujdar Allah Yar Khan.

==== Ahom-Mughal relations (1639-1645) ====
After the death of Pratap Singha, he acted as the de facto administrator and carried out the affairs with the Mughals.

In 1641, Momai Tamuly Borbarua flatly refused the suggestion of a trade convention between Assam and Mughal Empire as proposed by Allah Yar Khan. He also refused to make an inquiry into a case of murder committed by the hill tribes on the members of the Mughal khedda party.

In 1640, Momai Tamuly Borbarua requested the Mughal faujdar to repatriate an Ahom official who while touring entered Sarania hills (Mughal territories). In 1643, 63 Mughal traders and officials were confined by the Ahoms on the account of straying into Darrang. In November 1645, 107 Mughal sepoys illegally entered Darrang and advanced up to Singri in the Ahom territory with the pretext of catching elephants. This was protested by the Ahom frontier officer but was later killed following a scuffle. These sepoys were imprisoned by the angry Momai Tamuly Borbarua. The Mughal faujdar pleaded for their release but the latter refused.

Momai Tamuly had seven issues, including his youngest son Lachit Borphukan and he died in 1663.

== Bibliography ==
- Borua, Gopal Chandra (1930). Ahom Buranji. Baptist Mission Press.
- Sarkar, J. N. (1992), "THE MONARCHY AT ITS ZENITH", in Barpujari, H. K. (ed.), The Comprehensive History of Assam, vol. 2, Guwahati: Assam Publication Board, pp. 257–85
- Gogoi, Jahnabi (2002), Agrarian system of medieval Assam, Concept Publishing Company, New Delhi
- Gohain, Birendra Kr. (2012), Lachit Barphukan the National Hero of Assam, Publication Board Assam
