= Ramani Gabharu =

Empress consort of Muhammad Azam Shah

- Born: Ramani Gabharu c. 1656; Garhgaon, Ahom kingdom
- Died: c. 1684 (aged 27); Agra, Mughal Empire
- Burial: Lalbagh Fort, Dhaka
- Spouse: Muhammad Azam Shah (m. 1668)
Names
- Nang Seng
- House: Ahom (by birth); Timurid (by marriage)
- Father: Jayadhwaj Singha
- Mother: Pakhari Gabharu

Ramani Gabharu (c.1656 – c.1684) was a princess of Ahom Kingdom and the first wife of titular Mughal emperor Muhammad Azam Shah. She was sent to the Mughal Emperor as part of the Treaty of Ghilajharighat at the age of seven and was renamed Rahmat Banu Begum after she married Muhammad Azam Shah.

She was the daughter of Chaopha Sutamla, king of Ahom kingdom and his wife Pakhori Gabharu, the daughter of Momai Tamuli Borbarua. She was the niece of Lachit Borphukan and Laluksola Borphukan. She famously resisted Laluksola Borphukan's plan to hand over Guwahati to her husband.

== Early life ==
Ramani Gabharu was born as an Ahom princess, and was the daughter of Swargadeo Jayadhwaj Singha, king of Ahom Dynasty and his wife Pakhari Gabharu, the Tamuli Kuwari. Her birth name was Ramani Gabharu, and she was also known as Nangcheng Gabharu and Maina Gabharu.

She was the maternal granddaughter of Momai Tamuli Borbarua, an able administrator and the commander-in-chief of the army in the Ahom kingdom, and the niece of Lachit Borphukan and Laluksola Borphukan, known for their participation in the Battle of Saraighat that thwarted a drawn-out attempt by Mughal forces under the command of Ram Singh I to take back Kamrup.

== Marriage ==
When Mir Jumla invaded Jayadhwaj's kingdom and defeated him in battle, he made a truce with Mir Jumla on the condition that his daughter Ramani Gabharu had to be sent to the Mughal harem when she was only six, along with the princess of the Tipam King as ransom. Her father had to bound to deliver his daughter as a war indemnity at Aurangzeb's court on 15 January 1663. She was given the Muslim name of Rahmat Banu Begum after her conversion to Islam, and was brought up in the imperial harem. Five years later, she was married to Aurangzeb's son Muhammad Azam Shah on Sunday, 13 May 1668, with a dowry of 1,80,000 rupees at Delhi.

By the time, Guwahati was recovered from the Mughals by king Supangmung with the help of famous Ahom general Lachit Borphukan in the famous Battle of Saraighat. Lachit Borphukan earned much fame by defeating famous Mughal general Ram Singha in this battle. Had there been no Lachit Borphukan, it would have been utterly impossible for the Ahoms to win the battle. In that case Guwahati would have remained as the part of Mughal Empire as before. Even after being defeated in the hands of Lachit Borphukan, Ram Singh I spoke highly of the manifold qualities of the Ahom Soldiers.

Then, after a period of some years, it was proposed that Guwahati should be given to the Mughals and in return Laluksola, the viceroy of Ahoms at Guwahati will be made the king. When Ramani Gabharu learned of it, she wrote a letter to her maternal uncle Laluksola Borphukan warning him not to do such an act of betrayal. However, Laluksola Borphukan did not listen to his niece.

== Death ==
She is thought to have died in 1684 due to some unknown disease, at the age of 27. Though some put forward the theory that Ramani Gabharu was none other than Pari Bibi. This would put her death in 1678.

== Bibliography ==
- Pathak, Guptajit (2008). Assamese Women in Indian Independence Movement: With a Special Emphasis on Kanaklata Barua. Mittal Publications. ISBN 978-8-183-24233-2.
