= Borborua =

Borboruah (Ahom language: Phu-Ke-Lung) was one of the five patra mantris (councillors) in the Ahom kingdom, a position created by the Ahom king Prataap Singha in 1621. The position included both executive and judicial powers, with jurisdiction of the Ahom kingdom east of Kaliabor river and those regions not governed by the three great Gohains (Burhagohain, Borgohain and the Borpatrogohain), and the princely estates (Meldangiya raja). The region to the west of Kaliabor was governed by the Borphukan.

== Council ==
The Borbarua had a council (Chora) of Phukans reporting to him, called Choruwa Phukans. Each Phukan was responsible for receiving the royal revenue (in cash, kind, and services) from the subjects (paiks) and was also responsible for maintaining the guilds of specific professions (khels). The council was in Garhgaon earlier but moved to the Jorhat when the capital moved following the Moamoria rebellion.

Naobaicha Phukan
The commander of the Ahom navy, he led a thousand strong sailors with their boats. He had about a five-thousand strong militia, and received the service of 30 personal paiks.
Bhitarual Phukan
This phukan was responsible for the protection of the royal palace (raj kareng) with a six-thousand strong militia and he received the services of 30 personal paiks.
Na Phukan
This phukan guarded the nine gates of the capital with a five-thousand strong militia and received the service of 30 personal paiks.
Ujania Dihingiya Phukan
This Phukan was responsible for the Dihing territory; and there was a corresponding office in the Borphukan's council, called Namania Dihingiya Phukan. These phukans commanded four thousand paiks and received the service of 30 personal paiks.
Garhgaiyan Deka Phukan
The Deka Phukan commanded a 6000-strong group of select paiks and helped the Borbarua in his judicial work.
Garhgaiyan Neog Phukan
The Neog Phukan commanded a 6000-strong group of ordinary paiks (soldiers) and their commanders (Neogs). He helped the Borbarua in judicial work and received the services of 30 personal paiks.

To the above six choruwa phukans Rudra Singha added three additional phukans.

Nyaysodha Phukan
This phukan was responsible for disposing cases sent to him in the absence of the Borbarua.
Chang-rung Phukan
The Changrung Phukan was responsible for public works (constructing buildings, temples, ramparts).
Chiring Phukan
This phukan was responsible for religious rites and state ceremonies.

== List of Borboruahs ==
- Momai Tamuli Borbarua
- Tangasu Hatipuwali Borboruah (Burhagohain)
- Sengdhara Bengkhowa Borboruah (Chetia)
- Ghora Konwar
- Pelon Borboruah
- Lesai Debera Borboruah (Lanphima Luk kha khun)
- Lanching Shaikan Kirkiria Borboruah (Rangachila Duarah)
- Mecha Borboruah (Rangachila Duarah)
- Chakrapani Borboruah (Luk kha khun)
- Marangi Borbarua (Lanphima Luk kha khun)
- Alun Borboruah (Dihingia)
- Hridaynarayan Borbaruah
- Surath Singha Barbarua
- Rupchandra Borboruah (Bokotial)
- Kirti Chandra Gendhela Borboruah (Bokotial)
- Bhadrasen Borboruah (Bokotial family)
- Edabaria Handikoi Borboruah
- Namtial Bhagati Handikoi Borboruah
- Bokotial Jaynath Borboruah
- Baskatia Lahon Borboruah
- Srinath Duara Borbaruah (Rangachila Duarah)
- Bhodori Borboruah
