= Ahom–Mughal conflicts =

17th-century conflict in Assam

Ahom–Mughal wars
- Part of Islamic invasions of Assam
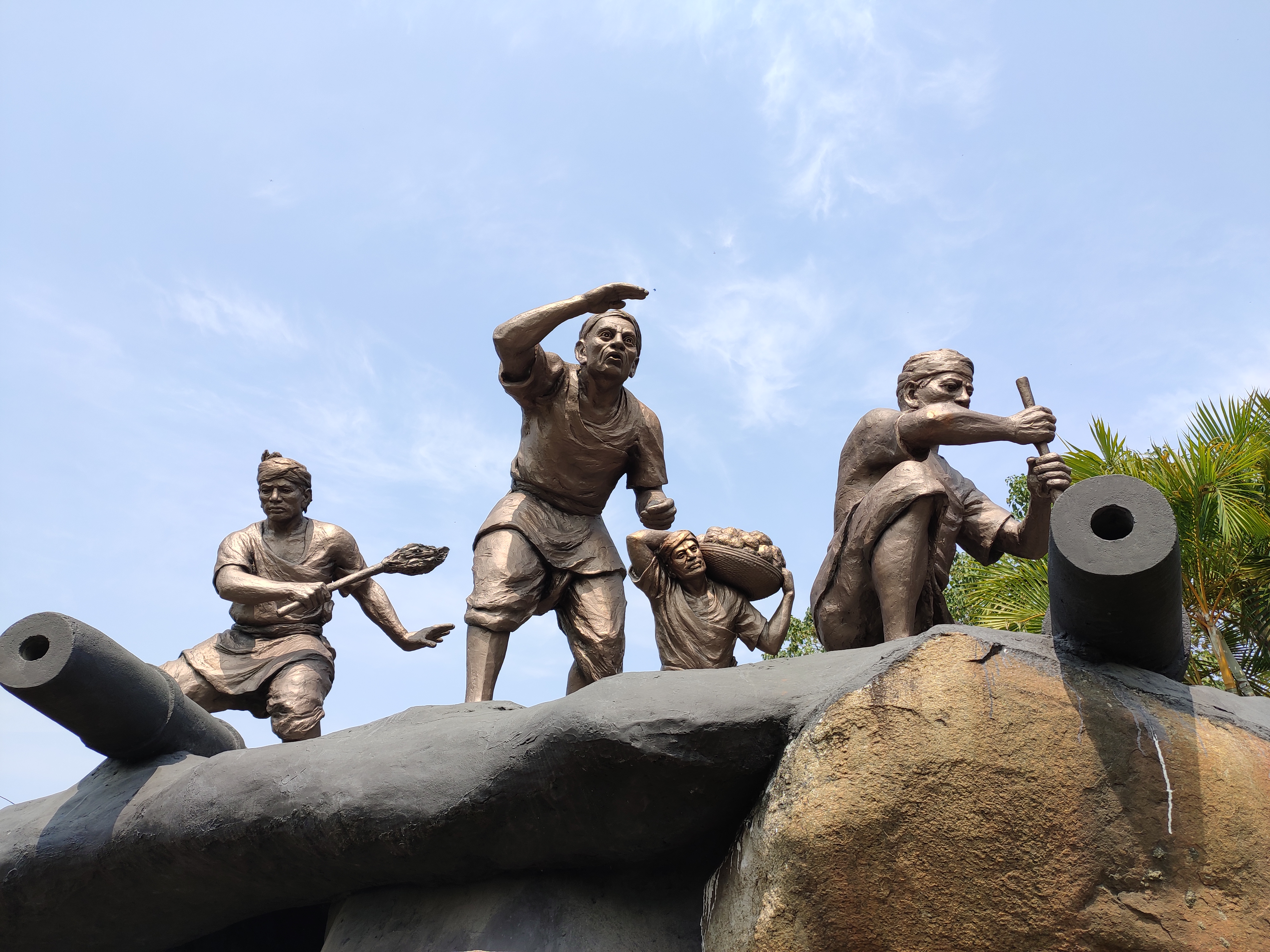
- Ahom artillerymen
Date	November 1615 – 16 August 1682
Location	Assam
Result	Ahom victory
Territorial changes	Ahom Kingdom regains control over Guwahati and entire Kamarupa

Belligerents
Ahom Kingdom	Mughal Empire: Bengal Subah; Koch Bihar; Kingdom of Amber

Commanders and leaders
Pratap Singha; Jayadhwaj Singha; Chakradhwaj Singha; Udayaditya Singha; Gadadhar Singha; Momai Tamuli Borbarua; Atan Buragohain; Lachit Borphukan	Qasim Khan Chishti; Allah Yar khan Sattrajit; Lutfullah Shirazi; Mir Jumla; Ram Singh I Munnawar Khan †; Mansur Khan

Ahom–Mughal conflicts (November 1615 – 16 August 1682) refers to the series of 17th-century conflicts (battles, campaigns, and treaties) between the Ahoms and the Mughals over the control of the Brahmaputra valley. It began soon after the eastern branch of the Kamata kingdom then under the Koch dynasty, Koch Hajo, collapsed after a sustained Mughal campaign bringing it face-to-face with the eastern Ahoms. After nearly seventy years of sustained efforts, the Mughals were finally ousted in the Battle of Itakhuli in 1682. The Mughals since then maintained interest in the region west of the Manas River via zamindars, till they were ousted from Bengal by the British about a hundred years later.

== Overview ==
A group of Tai people, that came to be known as the Ahom in due course, migrated from present-day Myanmar to the Brahmaputra valley in the 13th century. They settled in with the locals initially and created a new state that came to be known as the Ahom kingdom; and in the 16th century they vastly expanded their power and territory by absorbing the Chutia kingdom in Upper Assam, removing the Baro-Bhuyan confederacy in Nagaon and Darrang, and pushing the Dimasa kingdom further south. As the kingdom pushed west it came under attack from Turkic and Afghan rulers; and on one occasion the Ahoms general Ton Kham Borgohain pursued retreating invaders through a nascent Koch kingdom and reached the Karatoya river —and since then they began to see themselves as the rightful heir of the erstwhile Kamarupa kingdom

From the beginning, the relationship between the Ahoms and the Mughals was hostile and that was due to certain factors, such as, the Mughal alliance with Koch Bihar, the western enemy of the Ahoms and secondly the growing advance of the Mughals in their north-eastern frontier which alarmed the Ahoms. While the Mughals supported Lakshminarayan, son of Nara Narayan of Koch Bihar, the Ahom king Sukhaamphaa (1552–1603) entered into alliance by marrying the daughter of Lakshminarayan's cousin Raghudeva, the son of Chilarai who became the ruler of the eastern part of the kingdom, Koch Hajo, which roughly included the modern districts of Goalpara, Barpeta, Kamrup, Darrang, and a part of Sonitpur (up to Bharali). This dynastic alliance between Ahom and Koch was renewed afterwards by the next Ahom king Susenghphaa (Pratap Singha, 1603–1641), who married a daughter of Raja Parikshit. It is true that with a view to satisfy the territorial ambitions of his own nephew, Nar Narayan allowed partition of his kingdom. But unfortunately, in spite of being pacified, Raghudeva and his successors remained all along hostile towards the Koch royal house and this rivalry and antagonism between these two frontier states invited intervention and aggression of their two mighty neighbourhood powers: the Mughals on the west and Ahoms on the east.

== Conflict inception ==
From the time the Mughals appeared in the north-eastern frontier, a state of indirect rivalry and hostility began between the Mughals and the Ahoms. After the final defeat of Parikshit (1613), the first organised Mughal attack upon Assam was made with a view to conquer that kingdom. It was the outcome of the aggressive imperialism of the Mughals. "A desire for political supremacy and territorial expansion appears to have been the guiding motives of the Mughals." Boundary disputes and the trade rivalries appear to have complicated the situation, and political issues precipitated the conflict. After the extinction of the Kamrup monarchy, the Mughals came to regard the territory east of Barnadi up to Singiri as part of the conquered region and hence asserted their political right over it. Ahoms strongly resented this claim. "Moreover, the rich natural resources of the Assam valley and the prosperous kingdom of Kamrup in lower Brahmaputra valley, abounding in elephants and aromatic plants excited the cupidity of the Mughals and they were determined to force open the door of Assam."

The first organised open encounter with the Ahom kingdom was the well-deserved punishment meted out by the Ahom government to an unauthorised trader from Mughal India named Ratan Singh. His illicit trade was detected, his goods were confiscated and he was expelled from Assam. The Mughals got the necessary pretext for war and an imperial army was at once dispatched in 1615 under the command of Abu Bakr and Raja Satrajit of Bhusna. The imperial army advanced towards Barnagar, the old capital of Kamrup and next moved to Hajo and numerous outposts were raised in the surrounding region. In November 1615, Abu Bakr suddenly fell upon Kajali, the Ahom frontier post on the southwest. After a short skirmish, the Ahoms were defeated and leaving their war boats and the fort, they fled. Flushed with easy success the Mughals indulged in a series of aggressive measures against the Ahoms. The Ahom king then fortified the fort of Samdhara with a view to check the advance of the Mughals. Meanwhile, the Mughals had reached the confluence of the Brahmaputra and the Bharali facing Samdhara. After a month of inaction, the Mughals achieved a great triumph. They transported their horses across the Bharali and made a violent assault on the Ahom stockade on the left bank. The Ahoms thus suffered another discomfiture. The Ahom king sent a strong detachment to the Ahom commanders at Samdhara and exhorted them to fall on the enemy and fight to the finish. The Ahoms gained success in the Battle of Bharali and reoccupied the stockade at the mouth of the Bharali. The Mughals were taken by complete surprise and suffered heavy casualties. Thus in spite of the initial success, the maiden attempt of the Mughals upon Assam ended in a disastrous failure. They suffered a colossal loss in men and money, as well as military prestige.

== Qasim Khan's campaign ==
After a decade of informal hostility, circumstances paved the way for the renewal of open conflict between the two powers. Two factors, both political, appear to have been responsible for the conflict. The first was the asylum given by the Ahom king to the hill-chiefs of Dhanikal who had sought his protection against the ill-treatment of the Bengal Subahdar Qasim Khan Chishti. The second factor, which precipitated the crisis, was the wickedness and treachery of Satrajit, the Thanadar of Pandu who made a common cause with Balinarayan and instigated him to take advantage of the change of governor in Bengal in order to attack Kamrup. The invasion of Kamrup by Balinarayan compelled the Mughals to resort to arms. The Ahoms gained initial success. A fierce encounter took place, which ultimately ended with the total discomfiture of the imperialists. Thereupon, the Mughals fell back to their frontier post of Hajo. The Ahoms laid siege to Hajo and fighting continued for some time. At last both sides having been thoroughly worn out, the fighting was stopped for some time.

In 1636 The Ahom-Mughal conflict started afresh, the Battle of Sualkuchi was fought, under Pratap Singha, the Ahoms defeated the Mughals with a 10,000-strong army and a fleet, capturing Sualkuchi and securing significant spoils. This victory paved the way for further Ahom advances, including the capture of Hajo. The third round of conflict began soon. The imperialists advanced up the Brahmaputra and halted opposite to Samdhara in October 1638; severe fighting ensued. Although the faint-hearted Ahom admiral retired from the battlefield, the garrison in the fort of Samdhara offered such a gallant defence that the Mughals had to give up the contest with great loss of men and materials.

Both sides became eager for peace. Hence a treaty of peace was signed in February 1639. According to the Treaty of Asurar Ali between the Ahom general Momai Tamuli Borbarua, and the Mughal commander Allah Yar Khan, western Assam commencing from Gauhati passed into the hands of the Mughals. The Ahom king, for the first time, acknowledged formally the Mughal overlordship in Kamrup, the Mughals acknowledged the independence of the Ahom king and gave up all pretensions to the territories east of Barnadi in the north and Kalang in the south and the Ahom king agreed not to interfere in Kamrup. In addition, trade and commercial intercourses were resumed.

The Ahom-Mughal relations following the peace of 1639 was far from satisfactory. However, it would be wrong to assume that both sides strictly honoured the peace treaty of 1639. The keynote of the political history of this period is the endless criminations and recriminations of the Mughals and the Assamese on various rounds, such as, 'Kheda' operations, trade and commercial intercourse, boundary disputes, extradition of political offenders, and violation of personal liberty and privileges of the subject people.

In 1648, the Mughal Faujdar of Gauhati sent a message of congratulations to the Ahom king Jayadhwaj (Sutamla) on his succession. But, Jayadhwaj Singha (1648–1663), taking advantage of the emperor Shah Jahan's illness and the war of succession, expelled the Mughals from Gauhati, and chased them down beyond the river Manaha (Manas). He also devastated the territory near Dacca and carried off to Assam a large number of Mughal subjects as captives.

== Mir Jumla's Campaign ==
Mir Jumla invaded Cooch Behar and Assam and re-establish Mughal prestige in eastern India. After having occupied Koch Behar had also declared its independence. Mir Jumla entered Assam in the beginning of 1662. He easily repulsed the feeble resistance offered by the Assamese at the garrisons between Manaha and Guwahati. He occupied one garrison after another, and Pandu, Guwahati, and Kajali fell into the hands of the Mughals practically unopposed.

The easy success of Mir Jumla was due to dissatisfaction in the Assam camp. The leading commanders and the officers were the exclusive monopolies of the Tai-Ahom. But, King Jayadhwaj Singha had appointed a Kayastha as viceroy of Western Assam and commander-in-chief of the Ahom army despatched against Mir Jumla leading to resentment among the ranks. This officer was Manthir Bharali Barua of the Bejdoloi family. He was also appointed Parbatia Phukan. This appointment caused bitter resentment among the hereditary Ahom nobles and commanders, and the resistance which they offered to the invaders was neither worthy of the efficient military organisation of the Ahoms nor of the reputation which they acquired by repeated success in their enterprises against foreigners. Mir Jumla's march into Assam was an uninterrupted series of triumph and victories through the real secret of his success, namely, defection in Ahom camp, which has not been touched upon by any historian of the expedition.

The Ahoms took the fullest advantage of the unspeakable hardship of the Mughals. With the progress of monsoon, the Ahoms easily recovered all the country east of Lakhau. Only Garhgaon and Mathurapur remained in the possession of Mughals. The Ahoms were not slow to take advantage of the miserable plight of the Mughals. The Ahom king came out of his refuge and ordered his commanders to expel the invaders from his kingdom. A serious epidemic broke out in the Mughal camp at Mathurapur, which took the lives of hundreds of Mughal soldiers. There was no suitable diet or comfort in the Mughal camp. At last life became unbearable at Mathurapur and hence the Mughals abandoned it.

By the end of September, the worst was over. The rains decreased, and flood went down, roads reappeared and communications became easier. The contact with the Mughal fleet at Lakhau was restored which cheered the long-suffering Mughal garrison. The Mughal army under Mir Jumla joined the fleet at Devalgaon. The Ahom king Jayadhwaj Singha took refuge in the hills again. But in December, Mir Jumla fell seriously ill and the soldiers refused to advance any further. Meanwhile, the Ahom king became extremely anxious for peace. At last a treaty was concluded at Ghilajharighat in January 1663, according to which the Ahoms ceded western Assam to the Mughals and promised a war indemnity of three lakhs of rupees and ninety elephants. In addition, the king had to deliver his only child and daughter Ramani Gabharu, as well as his niece, the daughter of the Tipam Raja, to the harem of the Mughal emperor. Thus, according to the treaty Jayadhwaj Singha transferred Kamrup to the possession of the Mughals and promised to pay a heavy war indemnity.

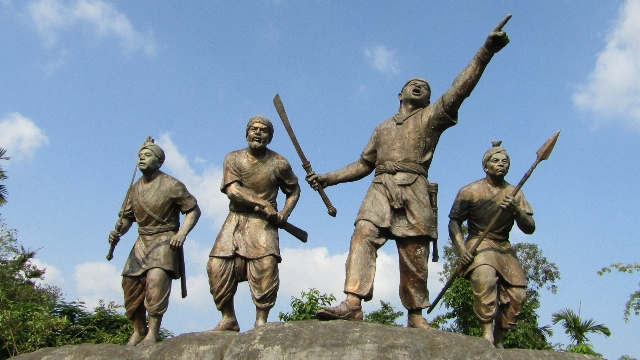
Assamese soldiers statues

The question of prompt payment of war indemnity of elephants and cash became a source of friction between the Ahoms and the Mughals. The first installment was paid by Jayadhwaj promptly. But as soon as Mir Jumla withdrew from Assam the Ahoms began to default. Jayadhwaj Singha's successor Chakradhwaj Singha (Supangmung, 1663–1670) was against any payment at all on principle. He shouted out from his throne: – "Death is preferable to a life of subordination to foreigners". In 1665 the king summoned an assembly of his ministers and nobles and ordered them to adopt measures for expelling the Mughals from western Assam, adding—"My ancestors were never subordinate to any other people; and I for myself cannot remain under the vassalage of any foreign power. I am a descendant of the Heavenly King and how can I pay tribute to the wretched foreigners."

A large portion of the war indemnity still remained undelivered for which the Ahom king had to receive threatening letters from Syed Firoz Khan, the new Faujdar at Guwahati. On receiving Firoz Khan's letter the Ahom king made up his mind to fight. On Thursday, Bhadra 3, 1589 saka around August 20, 1667, the Ahom army started from the capital and sailed down the Brahmaputra in two divisions. They encamped at Kaliabor, the Vice Regal headquarters, from where they conducted their war operations against the Mughals. Sayed Firoj Khan, the imperial governor of Guwahati and his army were not prepared for such an eventuality, with the result that the Ahoms gained a series of victories over the enemy. The Ahom army on the south bank was successful in their fighting. Their chief objective was the capture of Itakhuli which is a small hill on the south bank of the Brahmaputra at Guwahati. On 2 November 1667, Itakhuli and the contiguous garrison of Guwahati fell into the hands of the Ahoms. The enemy was chased down to the mouth of the Manaha river, the old boundary between Assam and Mughal India. The Ahom also succeeded in bringing back the Assamese subjects who had previously been taken as captives by the Mughals during the expedition of Mir Jumla. Thus within the short span of two months the Ahoms retook their lost possession and along with it their lost prestige and glory. On receiving the news of victory the king cried out-"It is now that I can eat my morsel of food with ease and pleasure". The success of the Ahoms in recovering possession of Guwahati and western Assam forms a momentous chapter in the history of their conflicts with the Mughals.

== Ram Singh's campaign ==
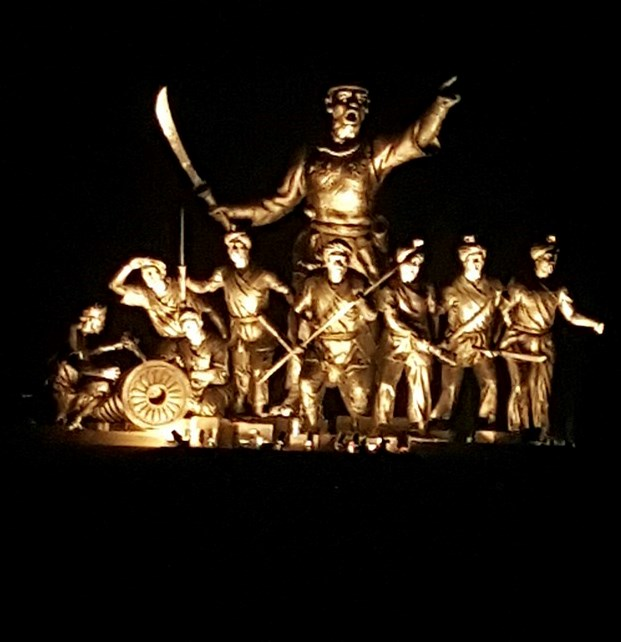
35-feet-high statue of Ahom general Lachit Borphukan and his army in the middle of the Brahmaputra.

In December 1667, the Mughal emperor Aurangzeb received intelligence of the capture of Guwahati by the Ahoms, and he at once resolved to dispatch a strong army to reestablish Mughal prestige on their northeast frontier. He commissioned Raja Ramsingh I of Amber, son of the distinguished general Mirza-Raja Jai Singh I, to lead an invasion of Assam. He was accompanied by Rashid Khan, the ex-Faujdar of Guwahati. Ram Singha reached the frontier garrison of Rangamati in February 1669. On Ram Singha's arrival at Rangamati, the Ahom commanders stationed at Manaha attempted to oppose the advance of the enemy. There were few skirmishes, but the Assamese could not attain any success. The Assamese were not prepared for such an eventuality and they left their frontier garrisons and sailed down to Guwahati.

Also, the Ahoms had not quite completed their preparations for resisting Ramsingh I’s advance. Lachit Borphukan, the commander-in-chief of the Ahom camp, had realized fully that postponement of the open encounter would enable him to bring his preparations to perfection in the light of the enemy's superior strength. Lachit Borphukan sent the following message to Ram Singh "Tell Raja Ram Singh that we want to know why he has come to our country." Firoz Khan, ex-Fauzadar of Guwahatii, now a prisoner of the Ahoms, was released and Lachit Barphukan sent him to Raja Ram Singh with the above message. Ram Singh demanded through Firoz Khan the restoration of the limit fixed in 1639 between Allah Yar Khan and Momai Tamuli Borbarua. By the time he received this reply Barphukan would rather fight than yield an inch of the territory which providence had given to his master.

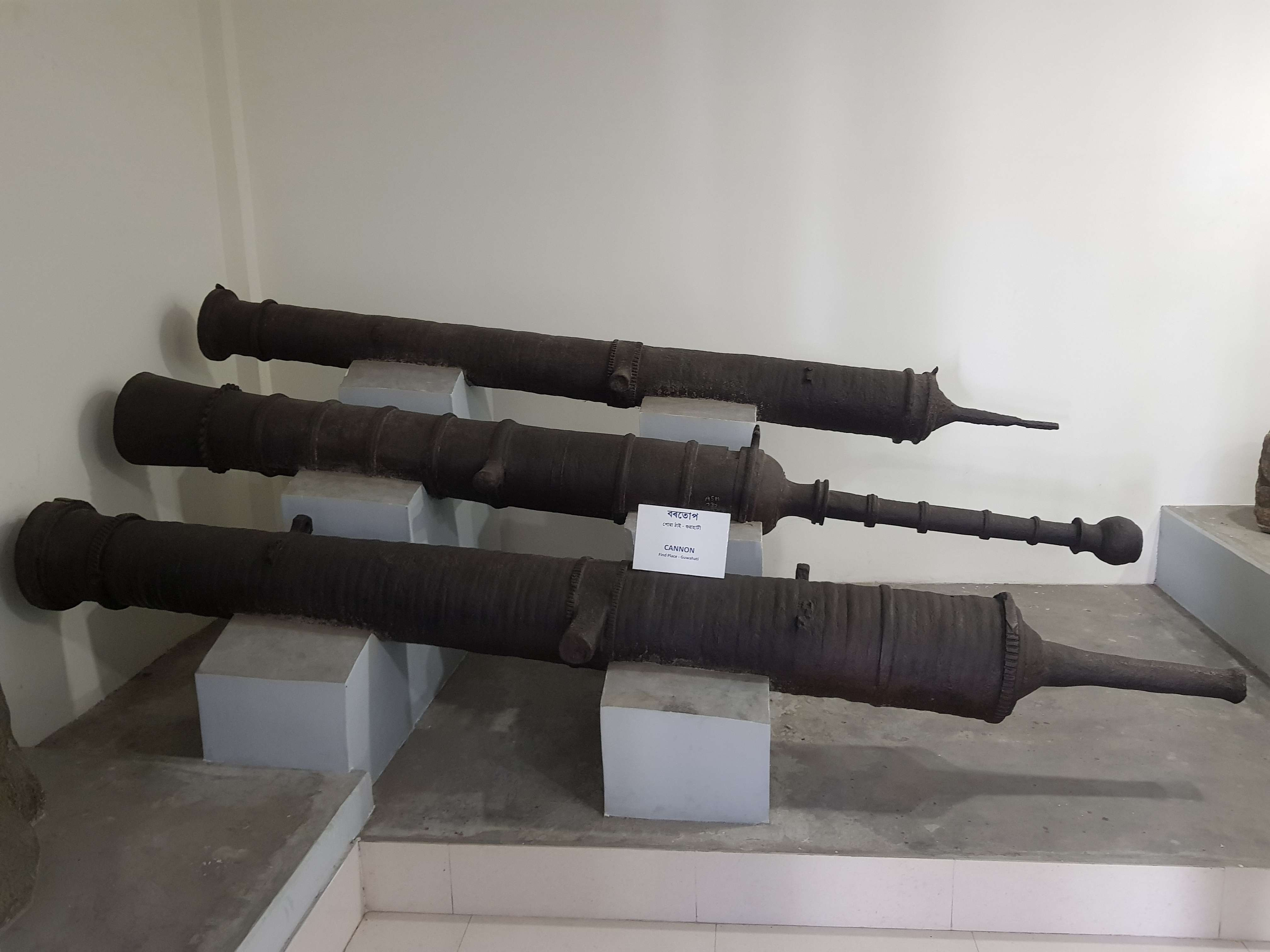
Ahom cannons dating the period of Ahom-Mughal conflicts, discovered in Guwahati.

Battle of Alaboi, At this juncture, Ramsingh I challenged Swargadeo Chakradhwaj Singha to single combat, and undertook, if he were defeated, to return with the army to Bengal. The Ahom king declined the invitation, and ordered his generals to renew their attack. They did so, and won another double engagement near Sessa. They followed up this success by taking the fort at Agiathuti, but soon afterwards Ram Singha attacked the Ahom army and routed it, inflicting heavy loss. The Barphukan hurried up with reinforcements, but his flank was tired and he was obliged to retreat with loss of his ships. Raja Ram Singha now opened negotiations for peace. The Ahoms were also tired of the war, and hostilities were suspended for a time. Sporadic engagements accompanied by proposals of peace continued during 1669 and 1670. From October 1669 to March 1670, Ram Singha withdrew himself from the fight.

In the meantime Ramsingh I sent a letter to the Barphukan inviting the king of Assam to fight a duel in the presence of the two hostile armies. But the Ahom king dismissed the insolent challenge by simply saying—"Ram Singha is a mere servant and he has no umbrella over his head. So I do not like to fight a duel with such a man." Chakradhvaj Singha could not hold his patience any longer. In the meantime, the Mughals had then concentrated their army near Alaboi Hill in the vicinity of Pacharia. A terrible contest ensued on the plains to the south of the Alaboi Hill. The Ahoms were badly defeated in that battle. The massacre at Alaboi had terribly upset Lachit Barphukan. Though the Alaboi massacre meant a serious loss to the Ahoms, it did not confer upon the enemy any decisive advantage.

But Ram Singha repeated his demands for the evacuation of Guwahati and reversion to the status quo ante of the year 1639. The Barphukan remained firm in the position he had previously maintained. So war was inevitable between the two parties. But when the war was taking a more critical turn, Chakradhwaj Singha, the king of Assam, died in April 1670. He was succeeded by his brother Udayaditya Singha (Sunyatphaa, 1670–1672)

Although the negotiations with the Mughals continued, Ram Singha suspected the sincerity of the Barphukan and returned to attack. Udayaditya renewed the war and ordered the Barphukan to march with 20,000 men from Samdhara to Saraighat. The Ahoms were successful on land but their navy was forced to retreat. Barphukan arrived with more ships and the Mughal army was beaten and the Ahoms also gained a second land victory. The Mughals could not stand the dash and fury of the Assamese onset. The Assamese were fighting for their life and liberty, and the Mughals for the mere luxury of triumph and territorial expansion. The Barphukan intended to chase them further still, but he was dissuaded by Achyutanda Doloi. The combat came to an end, and it was a decisive victory for the Assamese. This battle is known in history as the Battle of Saraighat. Ram Singha, weakened by the repeated losses, retreated to Rangamati in March 1671. Hadira opposite to Goalpara became the Ahom frontier outpost. Thus the Mughals were evicted from Kamrup, strong fortifications were constructed at Guwahati. Thus Ahoms remained in undisturbed possession of their territories till 1679 A.D.

== Post-conflict ==
In 1679, during the reign of Sudoiphaa or Parvatiya Raja, Laluk Barphukan, the Ahom viceroy of Gauhati, and his brother entered into a conspiracy and invited Muhammad Azam Shah, the then Nawab of Bengal (married to his niece Ramani Gabharu), to take possession of the fort at Saraighat. Accordingly, in March Laluk Sola made over Gauhati to the Mughals in return for a promised reward of four lakhs of rupees and an assurance to support Laluk's candidature for the throne of Assam.

== List of battles ==
Name of Conflict	Belligerents	Belligerents	Outcome
Battle of Bharali (1615 CE)	Ahom Kingdom	Mughal Empire	Ahom victory
Battle of Samdhara (1616 CE)	Ahom Kingdom	Mughal Empire	Ahom victory
Battle of Sualkuchi (1636 CE)	Ahom Kingdom	Mughal Empire	Ahom victory
Invasion of Kāmarupa (c. 1637 CE)	Ahom Kingdom: Koch kingdom	Mughal Empire	Mughal victory: Kāmarupa re-annexed into the Mughal Empire
Battle of Duimunisila (c. 1638–39)	Ahom Kingdom	Mughal Empire	Ahom victory: After the three days naval battle the Mughals were defeated by Ahoms in dūimunisila
Treaty of Asurar Ali (early February 1639)	Ahom Kingdom	Mughal Empire	Peace: Ahom king recognized the supremacy of the Mughals in Kamrup, and the Mughal fauzdar agreed not to interfere in the Ahom kingdom
Mir jumla's invasion of Assam (c. 1662 CE)	Ahom Kingdom	Mughal Empire: Bengal subah	Mughal victory: Pandu, Guwahati and Kajali were annexed by Mir jumla easily
Attack at Simalugarh (c. 1662 CE)	Ahom Kingdom	Mughal Empire: Bengal subah	Mughal victory: The Ahoms had to flee
Attack at Samdhara (c. 1662 CE)	Ahom Kingdom	Mughal Empire: Bengal subah	Mughal victory
Mir jumla's invasion of Ghargaon (c. 1662 CE)	Ahom Kingdom	Mughal Empire: Bengal subah	Mughal victory: Abandoning his capital and his all treasures, the ahom king Jayadwaj fled
Battle of Kaliabor	Ahom Kingdom	Mughal Empire	Mughal victory: Treaty of Ghilajharighat
Capture of Guwahati (c. 1667 CE)	Ahom Kingdom	Mughal Empire: Kingdom of Amber	Ahom victory
Skirmishes at Rangamati (c. 1667 CE)	Ahom Kingdom	Mughal Empire: Kingdom of Amber	Mughal victory
Battle of Sualkuchi (c. 1667 CE)	Ahom Kingdom	Mughal Empire: Kingdom of Amber	Ahom victory
Battle of Agiathuti fort (c. 1667 CE)	Ahom Kingdom	Mughal Empire: Kingdom of Amber	Ahom victory
Battle of Alaboi (c. 1669 CE)	Ahom Kingdom	Mughal Empire: Kingdom of Amber	Mughal victory
Battle of Saraighat (c. 1671 CE)	Ahom Kingdom: Jaintia Kingdom; Dimasa Kingdom	Mughal Empire: Kingdom of Amber; Koch Behar	Ahom victory: Ahoms retake Guwahati from Mughals
Battle of Itakhuli (c. 1682)	Ahom Kingdom	Mughal Empire	Ahom victory

== See also ==
- Ahom Dynasty
- Ahom kingdom
- Turbak's invasion of Assam
- Mogul Era (part of the History of South Asia series)

== References and further reading ==
- Roy, Kaushik. "Small Wars, Ecology, and Imperialism in Precolonial South Asia: A Case Study of Mughal-Ahom Conflict, 1615-1682." Journal of Military History 87.1 (2023) pp 1–31.
- Acharyya, N. N. The history of medieval Assam : (from the thirteenth to the seventeenth century); a critical and comprehensive history of Assam during the first four centuries of Ahom rule, based on original Assamese sources, available both in India and England (1992) online
- Richards, John F. (1995). The Mughal Empire. Cambridge: Cambridge University Press. ISBN 0521566037.
- Gogoi, Jahnabi (2002). Agrarian system of medieval Assam. Concept Publishing Company, New Delhi.
- Baruah, S L (1985), A Comprehensive History of Assam, Munshiram Manoharlal
- Barpujari, HK (1992). Barpujari, H K (ed.). The Comprehensive History of Assam. Vol. 2. Guwahati: Publication Board Assam.
- Nag, Sajal (17 July 2023). The Mughals and the North-East: Encounter and Assimilation in Medieval India. Taylor & Francis. ISBN 978-1-000-90525-0.
