= Muslim invasions of Assam =

Muslim campaigns in North-East of Indian subcontinent

- Part of Muslim conquests in the Indian subcontinent
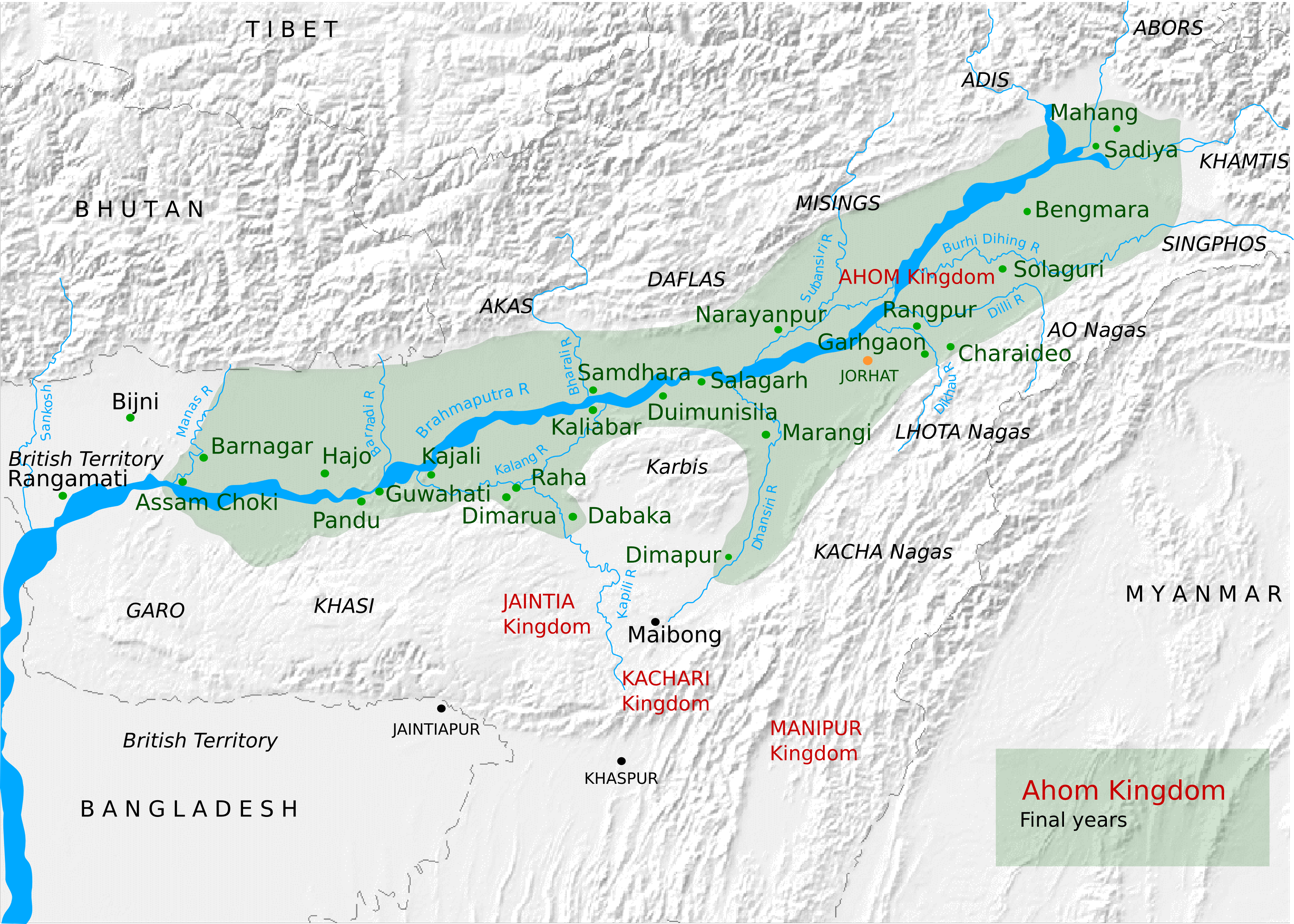
- Assam under Ahoms and surrounding areas c. 1826
Date	1206–1682
Location	Assam, Indian subcontinent

Belligerents
Ghurid dynasty Khalji dynasty Delhi Sultanate: Lakhnauti; Bengal Sultanate; Mughal Empire	Kamarupa; Kamata Kingdom; Koch Bihar; Ahom Kingdom

Commanders and leaders
Bakhtiyar Khalji; Nasiruddin Mahmud; Yuzbak Khan (POW); Turbak †; Ghiyasuddin Bahadur Shah; Shamsuddin Ilyas Shah; Sikandar Shah; Ghiyasuddin Azam Shah; Alauddin Husain Shah; Islam Khan I Mir Jumla II; Ram Singh I	Raja Prithu †; Raja Sandhya; Pratap Singha; Nilambar (POW); Suklenmung; Udayaditya Singha; Lachit Borphukan

Muslim Invasions of Assam were military invasions conducted by Turko-Afghans, Bengal Sultanate, and Mughal Empire to assert political control over Assam that began in 1206, when the Ghurid Muhammad Bakhtiyar Khalji invaded a fringe of Kamarupa with the last in 1671 when the Mughal commander Mirza Raja Ram Singh I tried unsuccessfully to take Assam at the Battle of Saraighat. The Ahom kingdom removed the vestigial Muslim power from Western Assam up to the Manas river in 1682 after the Battle of Itakhuli.

== Pre-Mughal invasions ==
=== Early invasions (c. 1206-1228) ===
Historians consider Muhammad Bakhtiyar Khalji's invasion of Tibet (1205–1206) that touched Kamarupa as the first invasion of Assam by a Muslim commander. His retreating army was annihilated by Raja Prithu in Kamarupa;

Ghiyasuddin Iwaj Shah made an abortive attempt in 1226 to occupy Assam—he seem to have reached the Nagoan region where the Gachtal inscription mentions that he was defeated. He seem to have hastened back to Lakhnauti, his capital, but he was captured and killed by Nasiruddin Mahmud.

In 1228 AD, Nasiruddin crossing through Jalpaiguri advanced Kamrup. Raja Prithu erected fortifications for defence but faced a conspiracy of an assassination against him, and was killed by the son of Iltutmish, Nasiruddin Mahmud. Nasiruddin appointed a tributary king to the Kamarupa throne, but he died in 1229 and Bengal was plunged into political chaos till around 1251, Assam remained an unknown region to the Muslim rulers.

=== Yuzbak's invasion (1257) ===
Malik Ikhtiyaruddin Yuzbak, previously a governor of Lakhnauti (in present-day West Bengal) under the Delhi Sultanate and newly independent since 1255, invaded Kamarupa in the beginning of spring 1257 during a period of internal strife and power struggle in the Delhi Sultanate. Kamarupa then was ruled by Sandhya (c.1250-70) whose domain was between Karatoya in the west to Barnadi in the east, with the capital at Kamarupanagara in present-day North Guwahati. Sandhya beat a strategic retreat to the hills, dammed the hill stream, and allowed his subjects to submit to the invader. When the spring rains started, he removed the dams flooding the plains and then sallied out and cut off logistic lines to the capital using guerrilla tactics. Yuzbak tried to retreat but he was soon surrounded by Kamarupi troops, caught, and executed; though others have reported that Yuzbak died of his wounds.

This invasion is significant for a number of reasons: Yuzbak was the first to build a mosque in Assam and had the khutbah read; his pattern of defeat were to repeat a few hundred years later during Mir Jumla's invasion of Assam

=== Giyasuddin Bahadur Shah's campaign (c. 1321-22) ===
In 1321–1322, Ghiyasuddin Bahadur Shah of Bengal embarked on a military campaign from Sonargaon, advancing along the old course of the Brahmaputra River toward the southeastern frontier of Kamrupa, (Note: It was recognised as a new state Kamata Kingdom with its capital Kamatapur) encompassing Enayetpur and Ghiyaspur. From this base, he launched an attack on the interior, targeting the region corresponding to modern-day Koch Bihar. The resistance led by Pratapdhwaj (r. 1305–1325), a usurping minister of Kamata, proved ineffective against the Sultan's forces. Continuing his campaign, Ghiyasuddin Bahadur Shah proceeded along the Brahmaputra and conducted a rapid, plundering raid as far as Nagaon. However, the Kacharis, who controlled the region at the time, repelled his forces, inflicting significant losses. Consequently, Ghiyasuddin Bahadur Shah's invasion yielded no lasting territorial gains. In 1327–1328, he was defeated and killed by the forces of Sultan Muhammad Tughlaq of Delhi, who subsequently annexed Bengal.

=== Ilyas Shahi campaigns (c. 1356-57) ===
In 1356-57 AD, Shamsuddin Ilyas Shah, who unified Bengal and established the Bengal Sultanate, carried out campaigns in Kamrup. The rulers of Kamata lacked the resources and capability to effectively counter the invasion. Their authority had been significantly weakened by repeated attacks from the Ahom king Sukrangpha (r. 1332–1364) in the east and pressures from the Kachari in the south of the Brahmaputra River. By 1329, a minor Hindu chieftain in Kamrup had declared independence, further eroding Kamata's control over peripheral regions. These conditions allowed the Sultan to advance rapidly up the Brahmaputra River through northern Mymensingh district, penetrating the core of Kamata-Kamrup between the Manas and Bornadi rivers. The Bengal Sultanate, under Ilyas Shah, made significant progress in conquering and occupying Kamrup, including its capital Guwahati, before his death around November 1357 AD. His son and successor, Sikandar Shah (r. 1357–1393), completed the campaign. Numismatic evidence supports the occupation of Kamrup’s capital Guwahati. A coin issued by Sikandar Shah in 1357–1359 AD, bearing the mint name “Chawlistan urf Kamrup” or “arsat Kamri”, likely commemorates this victory. However, that after about five years during Sikandar's absence a few local Bhuya chiefs tried, together with the Kamata and Varaha ruler Mahamanikya, to organise an effective resistance against the Bengal army of occupation left by the Sultan. In 1362, Sikander Shah advancing along the Brahmaputra he reached up to the Kopili River in Nagaon district where the allied armies fought him at Gachtal near the river.

=== Giyasuddin Azam Shah's campaigns ===
Ghiyasuddin Azam Shah, the successor of Sikandar Shah, capitalized on the conflict between the Ahom ruler Sudangphaa and the Raja of Kamata to invade Kamrup. The invasion was facilitated by Kamrup's internal instability, as the Kamata ruler Indra Narayan had been overthrown by Arimatta, whose successors were weak, leading to a precarious hold over the region. Numismatic evidence, including coins dated 799 AH (1396–97 CE) found in Koch Bihar and 802 AH (1399–1400 CE) found in Guwahati, suggests a second invasion or significant political influence by Giyasuddin Azam Shah in Kamrup. The Kamata ruler, facing pressure, formed a matrimonial alliance with the Ahom ruler, and together they expelled the Sultan across the Karatoya River.

=== Alauddin Husain Shah's conquest (c. 1498-1502) ===
The conquest was instigated by Sachipatra, a Brahmin whose son was executed by King Nilambar for his promiscuity with the queen. In 1499, Sultan Alauddin Husain Shah dispatched an army under the command of Shah Ismail Ghazi to conquer Kamata. Ghazi's forces besieged the Kamatapur fort and destroyed the city. Hussain Shah imprisoned Nilambar of Kamata and ended the reign of the Khen dynasty. Though Kamatapur fell in 1498, Hussain Shah was able to annex up to Hajo not before 1502.

=== Turbak's invasion (c. 1532) ===
In 1532, a Muslim commander named Turbak invaded Ahom territory with a force comprising 1,000 cavalry, 30 elephants, and numerous guns and cannons. He set up camp near the fort at Singiri. Ahom forces, under Suklen, crossed the Brahmaputra and attacked the Muslim encampment, despite warnings from astrologers. However, the battle ended in disaster for the Ahoms, who suffered heavy losses, with eight commanders killed. Suklen barely escaped with a serious wound. The Muslim forces stopped advancing for the rainy season at Koilabar.

The Ahoms retreated to Sala after their initial setbacks, where they regrouped with reinforcements and appointed Senglung as the new Commander-in-Chief. By March 1533, however, the Ahoms turned the tide in their favor. In a naval battle at Duimunisila, they inflicted significant losses on the Muslim forces. The Muslim commanders, Taju and Sangal, were killed. The invading forces lost 2,500 men, 20 ships, and several large cannons, marking a turning point in the war in favor of the Ahoms.

During this time, Husain Khan, another Muslim general, arrived to reinforce Turbak's forces with six elephants, 100 cavalry, and 1,000 infantry troops. Reinforced by Hussain Khan, Turbak took position near the Dikrai River, across from the Ahom camp. However, the Ahoms were now better prepared and managed to defeat the Muslims in several engagements. The final confrontation occurred near the Bharali River, where Turbak was killed by a spear, and the Muslims were thrown into disarray. The Ahoms pursued the retreating forces all the way to the Karatoya River, where they achieved a complete victory.

== Mughal campaigns ==
Mir Jumla's invasion of Assam which occurred in January 1662, is the most successful Muslim invasion in the history of Assam where Ahom capital Garhgaon was captured by the Mughals, but the success of that invasion was short-lived. The Mughal army suffered difficulty in the weather during the expedition and Mir Jumla was obliged to abandon and retreat away. The Battle of Samdhara which took place in 1616, was the first battle fought between the Ahoms and Mughals, followed by Battle of Alaboi in 1669, Battle of Saraighat in 1671 and Battle of Itakhuli in 1682, the final battles fought between the two powers.

== Sources ==
- Acharyya, Nagendra Nath (1966). The History of Medieval Assam, from the Thirteenth to the Seventeenth Century: A Critical and Comprehensive History of Assam During the First Four Centuries of Ahom Rule, Based on Original Assamese Sources, Available Both in India and England. Dutta Baruah.
- Basu, Nirmal Kumar (1970). Assam in the Ahom Age, 1228-1826: Being Politico-economic and Socio-cultural Studies. Sanskrit Pustak Bhandar.
- Sarkar, J. N. (1990), Barpujari, H. K. (ed.), The Comprehensive History of Assam: From the Pre-historic Times to the Twelfth Century A.D., vol. 2, Guwahati: Assam Publication Board
- Shakespear, Leslie (2012). History of Upper Assam, Upper Burmah and North-Eastern Frontier. Cambridge University Press. ISBN 978-1-108-04607-7.
- Richards, John F. (1995). The Mughal Empire. Cambridge University Press.
- Bagchi, Subhendugopal (1980). Eminent Indian Śākta Centres in Eastern India. Punthi Pustak.
- Sarkar, Ichhimuddin (1992). Aspects of Historical Geography of Prāgjyotiṣa-Kāmarūpa (ancient Assam). Naya Prokash. ISBN 9788185421018.
- Ramakrishnan, S. (2001). History and Culture of the Indian People, Volume 05, The Struggle For Empire. Bharatiya Vidya Bhavan.
- Sarkar, J. N. (1992a), "Chapter VIII Assam-Mughal Relations", in Barpujari, H. K. (ed.), The Comprehensive History of Assam, vol. 2, Guwahati: Assam Publication Board, pp. 148–256
- Sarkar, J. N. (1992b), "Chapter II The Turko-Afghan Invasions", in Barpujari, H. K. (ed.), The Comprehensive History of Assam, vol. 2, Guwahati: Assam Publication Board, pp. 35–48
- Sarkar, J. N. (1992c), "Chapter VII Assam and her Pre-Mughal Invaders", in Barpujari, H. K. (ed.), The Comprehensive History of Assam, vol. 2, Guwahati: Assam Publication Board, pp. 127–142
- Barpujari, H K (1992), "Preface", in Barpujari, H K (ed.), The Comprehensive History of Assam, vol. II, Guwahati: Publication Board, Assam, pp. vii–xi
