= Ahom artillery =

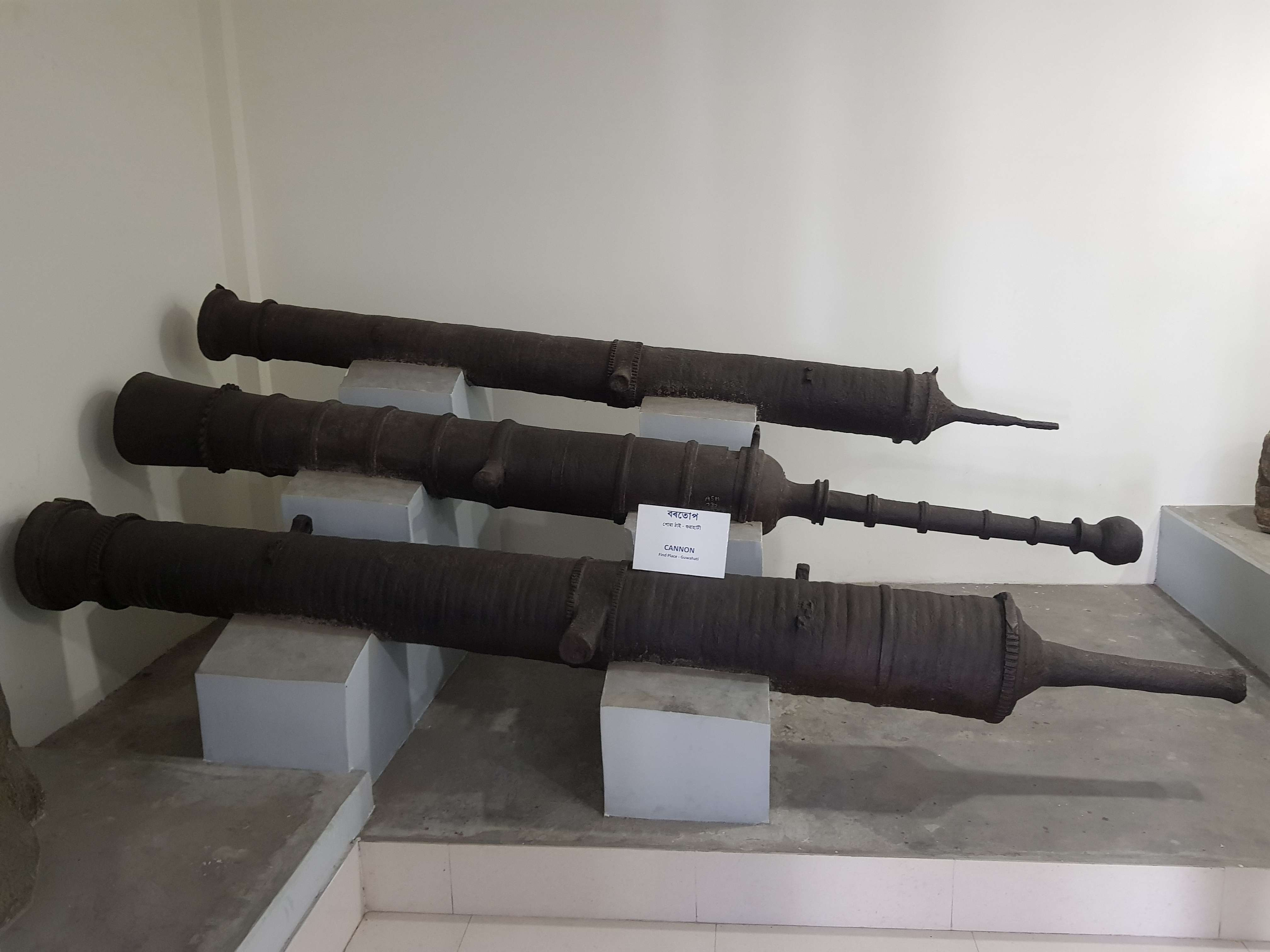
Ahom era cannons, preserved at Assam State Museum

Ahom artillery included many gunpowder-related armaments and was a very important dimension of the Ahom military technology. It is believed that fire-arms were first introduced at the time of Afghan invader Turbak Khan's invasion in 1532, but reference related to firearms is found much prior to that date, in 1523–24, Ahoms received 69 fire-arms after defeating the Chutiyas. More sources mention firearms being employed in the service of Ahoms, before the Mughal origins. Jean-Baptiste Tavernier even believed in that "it was from Assam that the use of gunpowder had entered the kingdom of China."

A Mughal account states in 1662: "They cast excellent matchlocks and bachadar artillery and show great skill in this craft. They make first-rate gunpowder..."

Ram Singh, who led the invasions of Assam in the 1660s–1670s, commented:

Every Assamese soldier is expert in rowing boats, inshooting arrows, in digging trenches and in wielding guns and cannons. I have not seen such specimens of versatility in any other part of India

The Ahoms excelled in making various kinds of guns, matchlocks, artillery, and cannons. They also possessed a large number of them at their disposal and also had an elite regiment of musketeer princes (Hiloidari Konwars). The materials for making gunpowder were locally sourced and developed an indigenous method for producing it. For the manufacture of firearms, a department was created under the supervision of an officer called Kharghariya Baura.

There were various types of cannons and guns, five types of cannons, and eleven types of guns.

== Gallery ==
Big Ahom cannon near the dist. court, Sivasagar, 1902

Bell metal musket of Ahom era

Ahom musket with inscription

Haat noliya hiloi

Hatimuriya bortup

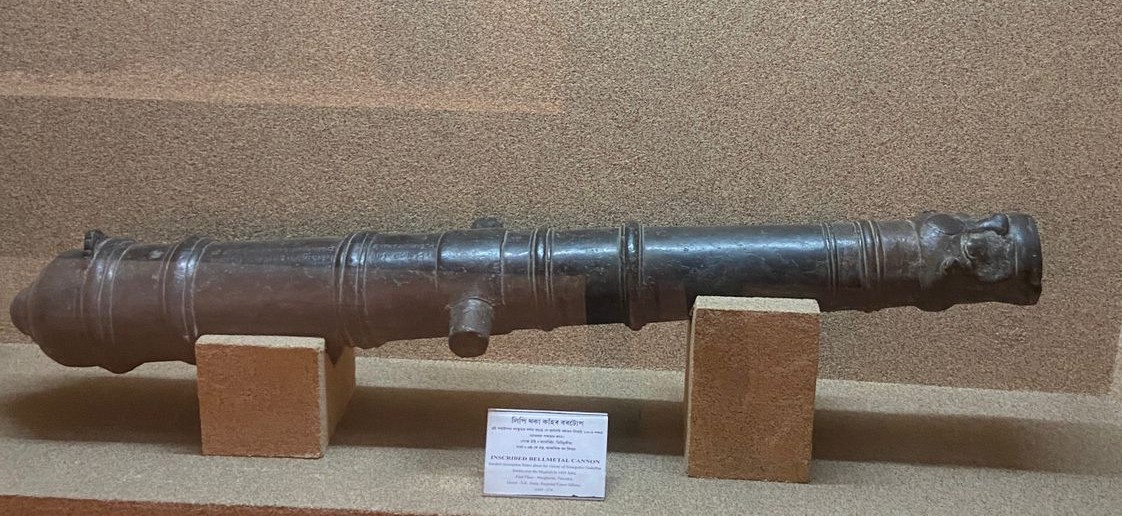
Artillery battery of Gadadhar Singha with lion like shaped muzzle

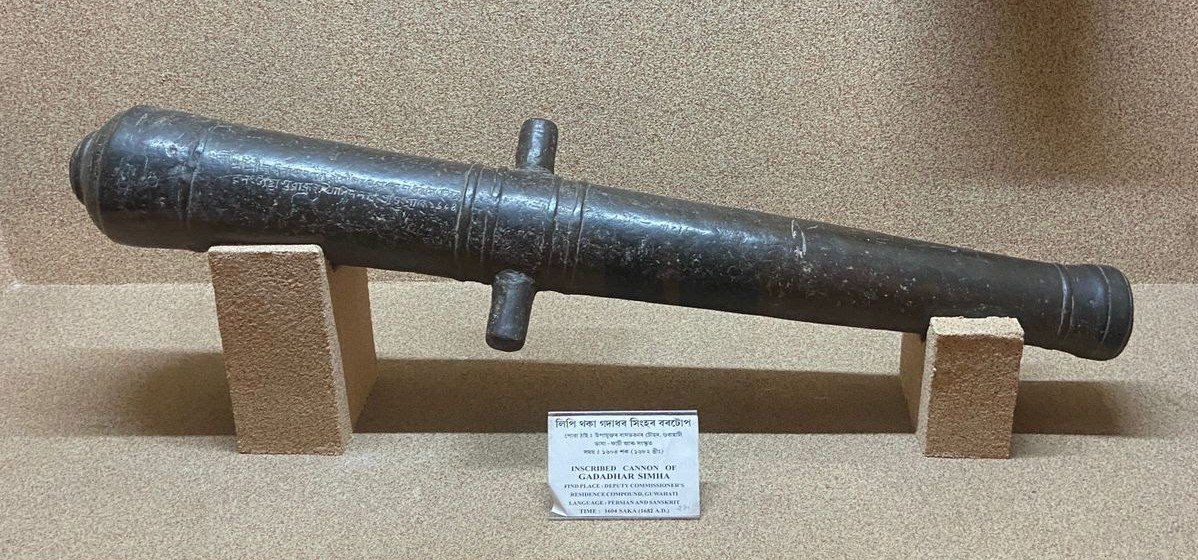
Cannon with inscription

== See also ==
- Ahom Dynasty
- Ahom–Mughal conflicts
