= Battle of Alaboi =

17th century battle in Assam, India

- Part of Ahom–Mughal conflicts
Date	5 August 1669
Location	Alaboi plains
Result	Mughal-Amber victory

Belligerents
Ahom kingdom	Mughal Empire; Kingdom of Amber

Commanders and leaders
Lachit Borphukan; Atan Buragohain; Charingia Pelan Phukan; Dikhowmukhia Rajkhowa; Nam-Dayangia Rajkhowa; Opar-Dayangia Rajkhowa	Ram Singh I Mir Nawab (POW)

Strength
40,000	10,000

Casualties and losses
10,000 dead	Unknown

The Battle of Alaboi was fought between the Ahom Kingdom and the Mughal Empire around 5 August 1669. The result was a Mughal victory, but Ram Singh I's next move was to open negotiations for peace. The Assamese also were tired of war, and hostilities were suspended for a time. Soon after the battle of Alaboi, Chakradhwaj Singha died in 1669. He was succeeded by his brother Udayaditya Singha. This was part of the seizure of Guwahati that led up to the final Battle of Saraighat which the Ahoms won.

== Challenge ==
Ram Singh I is said to have challenged Chakradhwaj Singha to a single combat and undertook in case of his defeat to return with his army to Bengal. The Assamese king, in his turn, grew impatient and ordered his commanders to attack the Mughals immediately and threatened them that, in the event of their failure, their hearts would be ripped open with axes.

== Battle ==
The Mughals concentrated their army near Alaboi hills in the vicinity of Dalbari. There was a vast plain in front of the Mughal camp, extending from the Brahmaputra to the Sessa River on the other. Lachit Borphukan wanted to avoid an open encounter with the superior Rajput cavalry, but the king ordered him to proceed. Ram Singh I despatched a force under Mir Nawab, and the Borphukan sent an army of forty thousand men. The Buranjis narrate that a female warrior named Madanvati at the vanguard of the Mughal army, rushed into the enemy lines with the speed of lightning, killing many soldiers with her sword, until she was shot dead by the Assamese soldiers. Persian sources do not mention it, possibly because Madanvati may have been a man disguised as a woman to demoralise the Assamese army. When the fight continued undecided, Ram Singh I ordered his lieutenants to engage the Assamese while retiring to the forts with spoils and captives. The Rajput soldiers were equipped with Yantras, machines with long shields, so that they could fight uninjured. The Assamese army was not prepared for the Mughal weapons and cavalry. As a result, the Assamese army lost ten thousand of their brave men.

== Aftermath ==
The Mughal emperor Aurangzeb was pleased with the successe at Alaboi and increased Ram Singh's mansab from 4000 to 5000. Ram Singh was also instructed to invest Guwahati soon, and if it was not possible, to devastate the land and plunder the Ahom kingdom and its people.

== See also ==
- Ahom Dynasty
- Ahom kingdom
- Ahom–Mughal conflicts
- Battle of Saraighat
