= Atan Burhagohain =

- In office January 1662 – March 1679
- Monarchs: Jayadhwaj Singha (1648-1663); Chakradhwaj Singha (1663-1670); Udayaditya Singha (1670-1672); Ramdhwaj Singha (1672-1674); Suhung (1674-1675); Gobar Roja (1675); Sur Singha (1675-1677); Tej Singha (1677-1679)

Personal details
- Died: March 1679

Military service
- Allegiance: Ahom Kingdom
- Battles/wars: Battle of Saraighat

Bahgaria Atan Burhagohain earlier Bahgaria Arjun Gohain was the Premier of the Ahom Kingdom from 1662 to till his death in 1679. He was one able minister and general, who played significant role during the Ahom–Mughal conflicts. He was made Burhagohain on January 1662, after the previous holder of the office was sacked on the accounts of his incompetence to fight against the Mughals. During the time of internal dissension that followed, he took an active role and played prominently till his assassination in 1679 by the Borphukan. He is best known for his foresight, judgment, and patriotism; and his loyalty to the Ahom throne for which he refused to accept the Ahom crown twice when offered to him.

According to the Buranjis, the Burhagohain was tall in stature and his strides resembled that of a goose. His face was broad, and he had two moles on the forehead. He was ruddy in complexion. He wore a buffalo-coloured gati or a cloth tightly wrapped round the body with two ends made into a knot near the waist and he carried a big hengdang or sword. Since he belonged to the Bahgaria clan, he is generally referred to as Bahgaria Atan Burhagohain.

== Appointment ==
He was appointed as the Burhagohain in January 1662, at the time Garhgaon was occupied by Mir Jumla. He oversaw the military resistance to the Mughal general, negotiated the Treaty of Ghilajharighat, planned the rejuvenation of the Ahom kingdom and was one of the architects of the Ahom victory at the Battle of Saraighat. He was known for his military tactics of guerrilla warfare that came to be known as daga juddha, and also for his statesmanship and wise counsel. He was appointed the Rajmantri Dangaria (Prime Minister) by the Ahom king Chakradhwaj Singha, and in the turmoil following the excesses of Debera Borbarua, he was offered the Ahom throne itself, which he refused. Despite his wisdom and keen political sense, he was unable to see through the treachery of Laluk Sola Borphukan, and was murdered by the Borphukan's henchmen in 1679.

== Works ==
=== Military ===
Atan Burhagohain was one of the key people in the victory of the Assamese in the Battle of Saraighat. The Prime Minister was personally in charge of the command of the northern division of the Ahom army on the north bank of Guwahati. His camp was situated at Lathia Parvat, and he had with him 80 chor-bachas or commando soldiers in his Pali (meaning a unit of command under a commander in Assamese).

From his base at Lathia fort, he initiated a campaign of guerrilla attacks on the Mughals, employing many well known commandos: Lai, Lechai, Chili, Mabi, Mari, Achor, Tunai, Baduli, and other spies who entered the enemy's camps at night and removed their treasures, money and disabled their arms.

Atan Burhagohain was also a highly skilled military engineer and after the occupation of Gauhati, he was directed by the King to oversee the construction of the necessary fortifications on both banks of Brahmaputra. Before the final Saraighat battle, on seeing the fortification and preparation of the Ahom army, Raja Ram Singha commented to his lieutenant Rashid Khan:

"Forts have been constructed by the Ahoms on tops of hills, and the outlying plains are also too narrow for the purpose of an open engagement. It is for this reason that the Assamese had proved invincible in their wars against foreigners. The fortifications are intricate and complex, and to each fort there are three passages. The enemy is beyond the reach of our heavy artillery; and there is no opportunity for fighting with arrows and guns. Their ministers, commanders and infantry are all to be admired for having constructed such an impregnable wall of defence."

This conversation was communicated to the Ahoms by a traveller named Hangalbhanga Laskar. On hearing this, the Premier Atan Burhagohain promulgated this message to the army:

"You are to note carefully that at the sight of our fortifications demoralisation has already started in the enemy's camp. His enthusiasm is already on the wane. The Barphukan should only remain inviolate in his command, and we shall fight to the last drop of our blood."

=== Statesmanship ===
Atan Burhagohain was not only a highly trained soldier, he was also an able administrator and astute statesman. Immediately upon ascending the throne, King Chakradhwaj Singha was impatient and contemplated immediate attack on the Mughal forces. He pleaded with the King that such attack would be suicidal, that first they should properly train the army, build the armory, stock food provisions and other war material, as the hostilities may continue for a number of years. He addressed the king and his councillors on this occasion:

"It is the legitimate duty of a sovereign to restore the old limits of his dominions by defeating and destroying his enemies. His success in war can alone enhance his glory and renown. So, His Majesty's proposal is just and proper. We have been enjoying absolute and uninterrupted sovereignty from time immemorial, and the high-handed imperiousness of the Mughals has transcended the limits of our forbearance. His Majesty has only voiced the sentiments of his ministers when he declares that we should fall upon the Mughals this very moment if possible. But we must provide the army with sufficient quantity of food provisions and war materials, and must hold in stock sufficient reserve to enable us to replenish the stores of the expeditionary army as soon as they become empty. This task of supplying reinforcements will become a matter of frequent occurrence."

"The country has become depopulated owing to the flight of the villagers from their homes during the last war with Mir Jumla. His Majesty has recently procured their return to their country and settled them in different places. We shall have to enquire whether these people have been able to obtain rice and food."

He said, “sakalo dravyat thaki chaul kotha he prodhan” ("rice is the most indispensable and important of all the items"). Long before Napoleon stated that "an Army marches on its stomach" Atan Burhagohain had realised this and convinced his king to make necessary preparations.

Atan Burhagohain further pleaded,

"A kari paik or a humble subject of Your Majesty buys an earthen pot to boil his course rice for trifling sum of two couries. Lest the rice and the pot, the total value of which will not, in any case, exceed twenty couries or one pice, be spoiled, he tests the soundness of the vessel by striking it with the fingers at the bottom and the sides two or three times before making the purchase. A bird erects a nest on high where she hatches to life her young ones. She takes them round from one bough to another after they have grown up a bit. They are brought down to the ground when they can fly. If they are let loose before they become full fledged they are eaten up by dogs and jackals. The mother-bird leaves them only after they can pick up and eat their food themselves."

Atan Burhagohain also advised to have the boatsmen and oarsmen trained:

"Similarly, when the three batches of rowers, posted at the middle and the two extremities of Your Majesty's barge, strike their oars simultaneously, the sight becomes beautiful to look at, the oarsmen feel spirited, the boat moves swiftly, and the helmsman wields the steering with ease and comfort. But, if on the other hand, there is no harmony and synchronism in the strokes of the three batches of rowers, the helmsman is inconvenienced in steering his shaft, the boat does not make any headway, and the spectators are far from being delighted. If the king directs his measures on the lines indicated above, then only he will be able to vanquish his enemies and extend his territories to the old limits." "

The counsel of Prime Minister Atan Burhagohain roused the monarch to a consciousness of the realities of the situation, and extensive preparation was made for two years before the onslaught on the Mughals.

After the reoccupation of Gauhati by the Ahoms, Atan Burhagohain was appointed by the king to erect the necessary fortifications on both banks of Brahmaputra, strengthen them, stock them with provisions and men. Lachit Borphukan was asked to post a contingent of soldiers at each strategic point under an able commander. Under the Premier's supervision, the civil administration of Kamrup was reorganised on sound footing, and Chaudhuris and Patwaries were appointed to realise the stipulated jaigiri-dhan or land revenue. The administration of the parganas of Kamrup was vested under various senior officers: Barphukan (Darang, Barbhag and Bangeswar), Paniphukan (Khata and Banbhag), Duara Phukan (Pubpar and Paschimpar), Deka Phukan (Sarubangsar and Kachari-mahal), Chetia Phukan (Ramsa and Sarukhetri), Dayangia Rajkhowa (Bar Khetri), Tar-Salagarua Rajkhowa (Barhanti), Dikhowmukhia Rajkhowa (Chamaria), Pani-Salaguria Rajkhowa (Nagarberha), Pani-Dihingia Rajkhowa (Bagaribari), Tarua-Dihingia Rajkhowa (Barpeta), Namdangia Rajkhowa (Barnagar), Pani-Abhoypuria Rajkhowa (Bajali), Bar-Abhoypuria Rajkhowa (Bekeli) and Saru-Abhoypuria Rajkhowa (Bausi).

During the war, Raja Ram Singha asked his envoy Panditrai:

"Well, Panditrai during your visit to Barphukan's camp you must have formed some impression of the Ahom ministers and commanders. Please tell me what you have seen and what you think of them."

To this Panditrai replied,

"The Barpatra Gohain, the Burhagohain and the Barphukan have all impressed me as wonderfully capable commanders presenting a rare combination of beauty, accomplishment, valour and wisdom. As to Burhagohain he is young in years, fair and handsome in features, sober and deep in intelligence, dexterous in all matters, and he rivals all others in soundness of his counsel."

Ram Singha commented, "It is really wonderful that a man can be so intelligent at this tender age." Panditrai added, "The Burhagohain is also an arch-diplomat." Ram Singha concluded, "Who will be able to cope with such a minister when he comes to years? Pride should be the heritage of that land where such a counsellor has taken his birth."

== Bibliography and references ==
- Bhuyan, S.K. (1957). Atan Burhagohain and his times. Lawyers' Book Stall, Guwahati
