= Chakradhwaj Singha =

Ahom king from 1663 to 1670

- Chaopha Swargadeo of Ahom Kingdom

Ahom King
- Reign: 1663 – April 1670
- Predecessor: Jayadhwaj Singha
- Successor: Udayaditya Singha
- Born: Ahom Kingdom
- Died: April 1670; Ahom Kingdom
Names
- Swarga-Narayandeva Maharaja Chakradhwaj Singha
- House: Charingia
- Dynasty: Ahom dynasty
- Father: Namrupia Raja
- Religion: Hinduism; Ekasarana Dharma

Chakradhwaj Singha (died April 1670, Assamese: স্বৰ্গদেউ চক্ৰধ্বজ সিংহ), also known as Supungmung, was Ahom King from 1663 until his death in 1670.

During his reign, the Ahom kingdom took back Guwahati from the Mughals following the reverses at the hands of Mir Jumla and the Treaty of Ghilajharighat. He is known for his fierce pride as an Ahom monarch.

== Reign ==
=== Ascension ===
Jayadhawaj Singha left no sons, so the Ahom nobles called in the Charing Raja and placed him on the throne. He was a cousin of the Jayadhwaj Singha, and a grandson of Suleng Deoraja, a previous Charing raja and the second son of Suhungmung (Gogoi 1968:448). The new monarch was named Supangmung by the Deodhais. He assumed the Hindu name Chakradhawaj Singha. At the installation ceremony, the Jaintia Raja sent an envoy to convey his congratulation. So also did the Koch Raja of Darrang, who had sided with Mir Jumla during his invasion, and with whom friendly relations were thus restored. About the same time Mughal emperor Aurangzeb had presented a khelat or robe of honour to Supangmung, and the imperial envoys insisted on the king's donning them in their presence. King Supangmung could not stand this grave humiliation. He shouted out from his throne--"Death is preferable to a life of subordination to foreigners. I have to surrender my independence for a suit of sewn garments!"

=== Recapture of Guwahati ===
Chakradhawaj Singha soon after the start of his reign started repairing the forts at Samdhara and Patakallangand and restored the army to a state of efficiency. In March 1665 the king summoned an assembly of his ministers and nobles and ordered them to devise and adopt measures for expelling Mughals from Western Assam, adding--"My ancestors were never subordinate to any other people; and I for myself cannot remain under the vassalage of any foreign power. I am a descendant of the Heavenly King and how can I pay tribute to the wretched foreigners. Early in 1667 Saiad Firuz Khan, who succeeded Rashid Khan as Thanadar of Guwahati, sent a strongly worded letter to the Ahom King, demanding the payment of the balance of the indemnity still outstanding. On receiving this letter, Chakradhavaj Singha made up his mind to fight the Mughals.

The necessary preparation were made with all speed, and in August 1667 a well-equipped army set out led by Lachit Borphukan to wrest Guwahati from the Mughals. King Supangmung gave valuable gifts to the commanders of the expedition and delivered to them the following message--"I desire that your wives and children, and the cows and Brahmans should be duly protected and preserved; and I should also acquire the prestige and reputation of having vanquished the Mughals. If you prove incompetent in the task of defeating the enemy at Itakhuli you shall not be let off with impunity. And, do you think that there will paucity of Phukans and Rajkhowas like yourselves."

At midnight, around November 2, 1667, Itakhuli and the contiguous garrison of Guwahati fell into the hands of Ahoms. The victors took possession of the elephants, horses, guns, coins and all other articles which they found in the imperial stores in Guwahati. The enemy was chased down to the mouth of Manas River, the old boundary of Assam and Mughal India. The Ahoms also succeeded in bringing back the Assamese subjects who had been taken captives by the Mughals during the expedition of Mir Jumla.

Thus within the short span of two months the Ahoms succeeded in recovering their lost possession and along with it their lost prestige and glory, and this was due mainly to the determination and courage of Ahom King Supangmung. On receiving the news of victory the king cried out--"It is now that I can eat my morsel of food with ease and pleasure"

=== The Ideal Monarch ===
The king was regarded by Assamese as the fountain head of all energy and inspiration, and Lachit Barphukan was fortunate in having Supangmung as the supreme head of the state. The patriotism and self-respect of this monarch have but few parallels in the history of Assam. He had to suffer in the beginning from the shameful legacies of the preceding regime. During the two years long preparation for the war with the Mughals, the monarch personally supervised the preparations—stocking of food, arms and ammunitions, he placed the smiths inside the palace enclosures to oversee their work, trained the archers with his own hand, then finally ordered the march to Gauhati when he was fully satisfied with the preparation.

Supangmung also sent letters to neighbouring chiefs in order to obtain their cooperation and support in his plan to resist the Mughals. The king's patriotic intent and self-respect came out in the letters of the period. In June 1664, he wrote to Raja Prana Narayan of Koch Behar, "You know for yourself all about the manner in which we repeatedly dealt heavy blows upon the Mughals. If God has inflicted on us a reverse on this occasion, does it imply that we shall be subjected to discomfiture a second time?" He wrote again in February 1666, "Because the Mughals have humiliated us once, does it follow that we should make no attempt to throw off this position of subordination to them?

Supangmung's insight and wisdom were best shown in the selection of Lachit Barphukan as the commander in chief to lead the new army. A wrong man would have behaved differently, but the king's nominee was imbued with the same zeal and patriotism of the spirited sovereign, and he succeeded in expelling the Mughal from Assam.

Supangmung also ordered his Prime Minister Atan Burhagohain, a skilled soldier, military engineer and diplomat to accompany Lachit Borphukan on the campaign to oust the Mughals from Assam. While the best brains of the country, whether in statesmanship or warcraft were in the frontline at Gauhati, the King had to manage the affairs of the country with inferior talents and abilities. Sitting at the capital for nearly two years he managed and gave logistic support to the army in the front supplying men, arms and food materials.

After the recapture of Gauhati and recovery of the land up to the old boundary at Manas river, King Supangmung organised and streamlined the civil administration and revenue collection system of lower Assam under senior officers—Phukans and Rajkhowas adapting from the Mughal's system. From the capital he maintained an efficient civil administration in the country which was necessary to guarantee the regular reinforcements of men and materials to the Army in the frontline.

=== Death of King Supangmung ===
The long war has taken both physical and mental toll of the King and in April 1670 Supangmung died, just one year before the Battle of Saraighat. The King did not get the satisfaction of seeing the final defeat of the imperialist Mughal Army at Saraighat, which sealed the fate of all the Mughal plans of expansion of their kingdom to the East. Supangmung gave the desired momentum which paved the way for the ultimate victory of the Assamese.

== See also ==
- Ahom Dynasty
- Battle of Saraighat
- Battle of Alaboi
