= Pacharia =

- Village
- Location in Assam, India Pacharia (India)
- Coordinates: 26.31°N 91.61°E
- Country: India
- State: Assam
- District: Kamrup

Government
  - Body: Gram panchayat

Languages
  - Official: Assamese
- Time zone: UTC+5:30 (IST)
- PIN: 781104
- Vehicle registration: AS
- Website: kamrup.nic.in

Pacharia is a village in Kamrup, situated in north bank of river Brahmaputra.

== Transport ==
Pacharia is accessible through National Highway 31. All major private commercial vehicles ply between Pacharia and nearby towns.

== See also ==
- Nizdemoria
- Nawkata
