= Battle of Saraighat =

1671 battle of the Ahom-Mughal conflicts

- Part of Ahom-Mughal conflicts
| Date | March 1671; 355 years ago |
| Location | Saraighat, Assam, India |
| Result | Ahom victory |
| Territorial changes | Ahoms take Guwahati from Mughals |

Belligerents
| Ahom Kingdom; Supported by: Jaintia Kingdom; Dimasa Kingdom | Mughal Empire; Jaipur State; Supported by: Koch Behar |

Commanders and leaders
| Lachit Borphukan; Chakradhwaj Singha; Udayaditya Singha; Atan Burhagohain | Ram Singh I Munnawar Khan † |

Strength
| 100,000 (militia) | (35,000+ infantry, 18,000 cavalry, 15,000 archers and shieldmen; 21 Rajput Thakurs and their contingents, and 40 ships.) |

Battle of Saraighat Timeline

| ← | Invasion of Mir Jumla |

| ← | Treaty of Ghilajharighat |

| ← | Ahoms retake Guwahati |

| ← | Battle of Saraighat |

| ← | Ram Singh returns to Delhi |

| ← | Battle of Alaboi |

| ← | Clash at Manas |

| Lachit Borphukan |
| Laluk Sola Borphukan |
| Atan Burhagohain |
| Ram Singh's campaign |
| Ram Singh at Rangamati |
| Mir Jumla's Campaign |
| Ram Singh's march |

An approximate time-scale of events
around the Battle of Saraighat

The Battle of Saraighat was a naval battle fought in 1671 between the Mughal Empire (led by the Kachwaha raja, Ram Singh I), and the Ahom Kingdom (led by Lachit Borphukan) on the Brahmaputra river at Saraighat, now in Guwahati, Assam, India. This was the decisive battle that ended the years long Mughal siege of Guwahati, with the Ahoms pushing away the Mughals west beyond the Manas river.

The Ahoms, smarting from the occupation of the capital by Mir Jumla and the harsh conditions of Treaty of Ghilajharighat, decided to lure a Mughal imperial force to Saraighat and take a stand there. Although weaker, the Ahom Army defeated the massive Mughal Army with clever diplomatic negotiations to buy time, guerrilla tactics, psychological warfare, military intelligence and by exploiting the weakness of the Mughal forces — its navy.

The Battle of Saraighat was the last battle in the last major attempt by the Mughals to extend their empire into Assam. Though the Mughals managed to regain Guwahati briefly later after a Borphukan deserted it, the Ahoms wrested control in the Battle of Itakhuli in 1682 and maintained it till the end of their rule.

The commanders and leaders who were stationed in and around Saraighat emerged as a power group called the Saraighatias that participated in subsequent Ahom internal power struggles.

== Background ==
Mir Jumla's invasion had left the Ahom kingdom depopulated, fortifications destroyed, and the treasury depleted due to the conditions of the January 1663 Treaty of Ghilajharighat. Beside the debilitating indemnity the Ahoms had to pay the Mughals, they had to accept the vassalage of the Mughal empire, let the Mughals take back possession of the land from Manas River to Guwahati, and cede to them the Ahom possession from Guwahati to Bharali River in the north bank of Brahmaputra River and Guwahati to Kolong River in the south bank.

== Ahom preparations for war ==
After the humiliating defeat inflicted by Mir Jumla, the Ahom king Jayadhwaj Singha died in despair. On his deathbed, he exhorted his cousin and successor Chakradhwaj Singha to "remove the spear of humiliation from the bosom of the nation." There followed a complete overhaul of the Ahom kingdom. People who had dispersed due to Mir Jumla's invasion were rehabilitated in the appropriate khels, food and military productions were increased, new forts were constructed and garrisoned and an expeditionary army was organized under a new commander—Lachit Borphukan. Alliances were renewed with the Jaintia and the Kachari kingdoms. During this period Mughal imperial demands were tactfully and diplomatically rebuffed, but when the new faujdar of Guwahati, Firuz Khan, forced the matter in March 1667, the Ahoms were compelled to move. In August 1667 the Ahom army, under Lachit Borphukan and accompanied by Atan Burhagohain, sailed downstream to retake Guwahati.

== Ahoms retake Guwahati ==
Lachit made Kaliabor, the old seat of the Borphukan, his base camp and advanced toward Guwahati along both banks of the Brahmaputra. On the north bank the Deka Phukan retook Bahbari in early September 1667. On the south bank, the Nausalia Phukan and others, moving on land and water, captured Kajali, Sonapur, Panikhaiti, and Titamara forts between the Kapili river and Guwahati. The Ahoms then reached Guwahati which was defended by five choukies on each bank of the Brahmaputra (north—Kanai-borosi-bowa, Hillar, Hindurighopa, Patduar and Korai; south—Latasil, Joiduar, Dharamduar, Duarguria and Pandu). With some loss, the Ahoms captured Shah Buruz and Rangamahal forts, a little north of the city. An extended battle was fought for the Itakhuli fort (at the site of the current Deputy Commissioner's bungalow). The Ahoms besieged Joiduar, occupied Pandu, and in spite of a Mughal reinforcement, approached Itakhuli. The grand attack was launched on the night of 4 November 1667, when the Ahoms scaled the walls by ladders and after two months of siege, Itakhuli fell in mid-November 1667. Most of the defenders were massacred, many surrendered but a few managed to escape. War provisions, treasures and war material fell into Ahom hands.

The Mughals received some reinforcement at this point and retaliated against the Ahoms. The Ahoms fought back with their naval forces and removed them from their bases in Umananda and Barhat. The Mughals, pursued by the Ahoms, managed to fortify the Manahmukh (the confluence of Manas river) and fend off the attackers for some time but Firuz Khan finally surrendered and was taken prisoner. This brought an end to the recapture of Guwahati and the Ahoms were able to control their old Manas border once again. But this did not last long and they had to beat a strategic retreat due to the advancing Mughal army of Raja Ram Singh.

== Mughal imperial invasion ==
Mughal emperor Aurangzeb was informed of the losses on 19 December 1667 and he commissioned Raja Ram Singh of Amber, son of the famous Mirza Raja Jai Singh, to take back Guwahati. Ram Singh left Delhi on 27 December 1667 and finally reached Rangamati in February 1669. He was accompanied by Rashid Khan, ex-faujdar of Guwahati. The Ahoms, anticipating a Mughal strike, are said to have followed his movements from Delhi itself. Along the way Aurangzeb augmented Ram Singh's forces of 4,000 troopers (from his char-hazaari mansab), 1,500 ahadis (soldiers recruited by the Emperor) and 500 barqandezes by an additional 30,000 infantrymen, 21 Rajput chiefs (Thakurs) with their contingents, 18,000 cavalry, 10,000 Koch archers and shieldmen and 40 ships. When Lachit surveyed the massive Mughal force later, he was moved to tears and he uttered: "It is a tragedy that my country is facing this dire catastrophe during my Phukanship. How will my king be saved? How will my people be saved? And how will my posterity be saved?"

Armies from Koch Bihar joined the Mughal forces since they were vassals.

== Ahom strategic planning and Mughal attacks ==
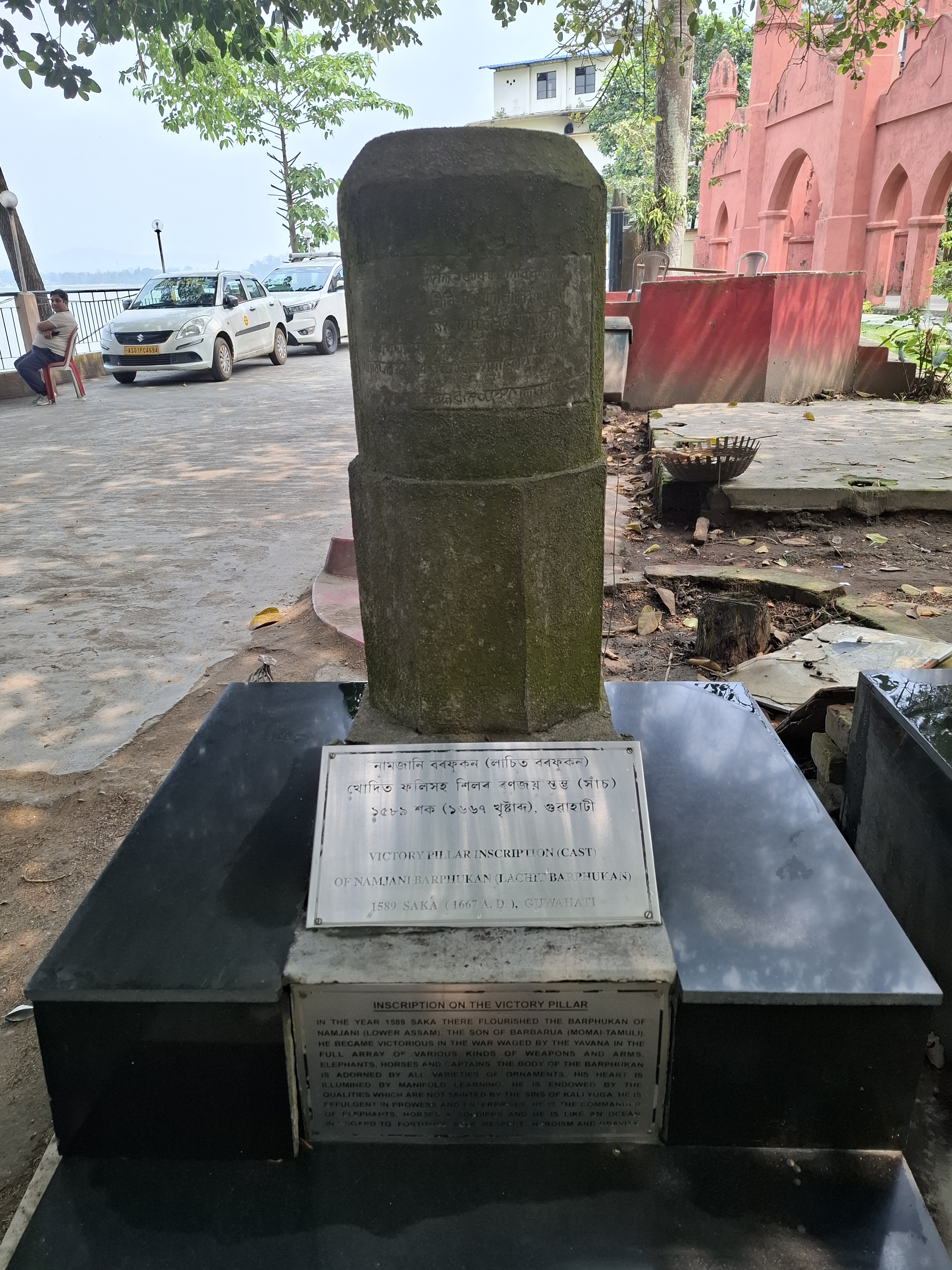
Victory Pillar, Battle of Saraighat

Aware of Mughal military might and the weakness of the Ahom militia, especially against the professional cavalry and mounted forces in open fields, Lachit Borphukan and the other commanders decided to choose the terrain of the battlefield with care. The choice fell on Guwahati, which was hilly, on the way to the heart of the Ahom kingdom and without open fields where the Mughal forces would not have sufficient mobility. The only way east was via the Brahmaputra river passing through it. The Brahmaputra at Saraighat, at its narrowest 1 km wide, was ideal for a naval defense. To check the Mughal advance, Lachit prepared a complex system of mud embankments in Guwahati When the Mughals found Guwahati impregnable by land, they would be forced to use their navy, which was their weakest asset. Lachit set up his headquarters at Andharubali, the sandbanks between the Kamakhya and Sukreshwar hills. The deliberations of the war council were recorded and made into a manual.

When the Mughal march reached the Manas River in March–April 1669 and defeated Ahom forces, Lachit decided on a strategic retreat to Guwahati. Three Rajkhowas were asked to meet the Mughal forces and retreat to Guwahati, keeping the Mughal forces in sight but beyond the reach of their weapons. When the Mughals reached closer, he started a sham negotiation via the captured Firuz Khan with Ram Singh, who had set up camp at Agiathuti, calling the Mughal Emperor the "Bhai Raja" (brother sovereign) to the Ahom king. And when he was ready for the Mughal attacks, he sent words to Ram Singh that "Guwahati and Kamrup do not belong to the Mughals" since they were taken from the Koch and that the Assamese were prepared to fight to the last.

A period of battles between the Ahom and Mughal forces in the region of Guwahati followed, with varied results with forts changing hands many times. In these battles, the Mughal forces were arranged in four divisions:

1. The north bank, commanded by Ram Singh himself.
2. The south bank, under Ali Akbar Khan, Mir Sayyid Khan, Raja Indramani, Raja Jaynarayan, and Marul Khan
3. The Sindurighopa entrance, under Jahir Beg, Kayam Khan, Ghanashyam Bakshi, and three Baruah's from Koch Bihar—Kavisekhar, Sarveshwar, and Manmatha.
4. The river, guarded by the naval commanders Mansur Khan, Latif Khan, Iswarpati, firingis (Europeans), and one Kapidan Raja.

In these attacks the Ahom allies—the Garos, the Jaintia, the Nagas, the Rani of Darrang, the Raja of Rani, and even the monsoons of 1669—joined battle. The Ahom defense was arranged as:

1. The north bank, under the command of Atan Burhagohain.
2. The south bank, under the command of Lachit Borphukan.

Both commanders had a number of pali commanders each defending a specific strategic area, with each pali reorganized in response to the challenge posed by Ram Singh's forces.

Aurangzeb received information of the lack of progress in August 1669 and made arrangements with the Subahdar of Bengal, Shaistha Khan, to provide reinforcements to Ram Singh. This period is also known for Atan Burhagohain's dagga judha (guerilla warfare). Ram Singh protested that these harassing campaigns lowered the "dignity of warfare", and withdrew from fighting (October 1669 – March 1670), to no particular military advantage.

== Major Ahom reversal at Alaboi ==
One of these battles stood out for a major Ahom reversal. Exasperated with the delaying tactics of the Borphukan, Ram Singh asked for a duel with the Ahom king. He promised to withdraw from Assam with his army if he was defeated. Lachit updated Chakradhwaj Singha about this proposal, who rejected the offer on the ground that it was beneath his dignity to duel a mere servant "who has no umbrella over his head" (who is not a "Chhatrapati"). Annoyed with Ram Singh's proposal he ordered Lachit to confront the Mughals militarily. In a battle that was set up as a challenge, a force of 10,000 Mughals under Mir Nawab was to confront a force of 20,000 Ahom cavalry. Ram Singh's "approach was psychological, marked by pride, chivalry and revenge". The Ahom approach, to cover their basic weaknesses, was based on "diplomacy, deception and mispresentation". So instead of 20,000, they sent in 40,000 and using an anti-koch tactic that had worked against Chilarai, they dressed their vanguard archers and musketeers as Brahmans to make the Rajput warriors desist from killing them. Ram Singh, on the other hand, set a woman, Madanavati, dressed as a man, to command the vanguard to deny the Ahoms any glory in case of a victory. The battle took place in the fields adjoining the Alaboi hills about 5 August 1669.

In the first phase, Madanavati dispersed the first four lines of the Ahom vanguard with ease, but the Borphukan had trenches dug to conceal his other lines. In the second phase, a diversion to cross the Brahmaputra was thwarted, and Madanavati was shot. The battle turned and in the third phase, Mir Nawab's forces were routed. Enraged at the deception, Ram Singh let loose his veteran horsemen and in the carnage that followed, 10,000 Ahom soldiers were massacred.

Aurangzeb was pleased with these Mughal successes and increased Ram Singh's mansab from 4000 to 5000. Ram Singh was also instructed to invest Guwahati soon, and if it was not possible, to devastate the land and plunder the people.

== Final diplomatic maneuvers ==
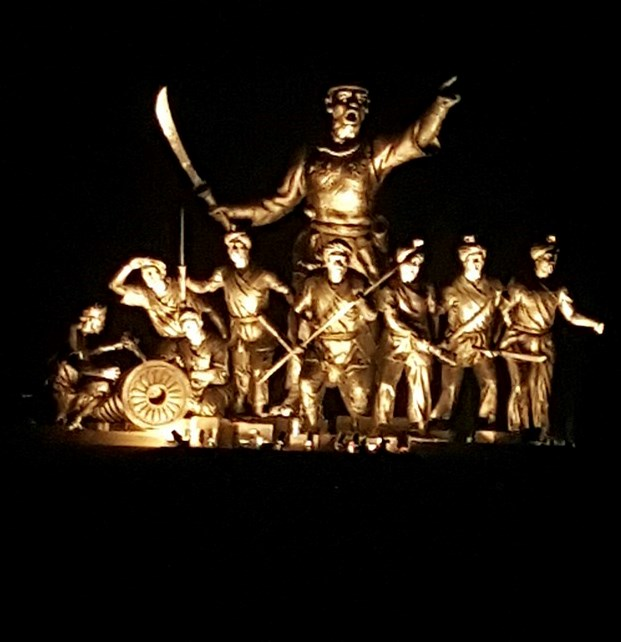
35-feet-high statue of Ahom general Lachit Borphukan and his army in the middle of the Brahmaputra

After the Mughal advances in late 1669, Ram Singh began diplomatic efforts. The proposal was for the Assamese to evacuate Guwahati and a return to the 1639 status quo (Treaty of Asurar Ali) in return for a Mughal payment of 300,000 rupees. The Ahoms did not respond favorably. Ram Singh next attempted to bribe and create divisions among the Ahom field commanders (Phukans). In the meantime, the Ahom king Chakradhwaj Singha died and was succeeded by his brother Udayaditya Singha. The long war had resulted in popular discontent in the Ahom kingdom. Ram Singh again put forward his proposal on the 1639 status quo settlement and this time the Ahoms appeared receptive. The Ahom king, though displeased, left the decision to his commanders in Guwahati. In the meeting which included Lachit Borphukan, the only dissenter to the proposal was Atan Burhagohain, who displayed his statesmanship.

Atan Burhagohain argued that there was no guarantee that the Emperor at Delhi will abide by Ram Singh's assurance. Also, a settlement then would mean that the drain on the country's resources would have been in vain. Further, what was the guarantee that once the Mughals take Guwahati, they would not reach for Garhgaon or even Namrup.

Atan Burhagohain was able to persuade the other commanders and the Ahoms rejected this proposal. The diplomatic efforts of Ram Singh failed once again.

== Final battle at Saraighat ==
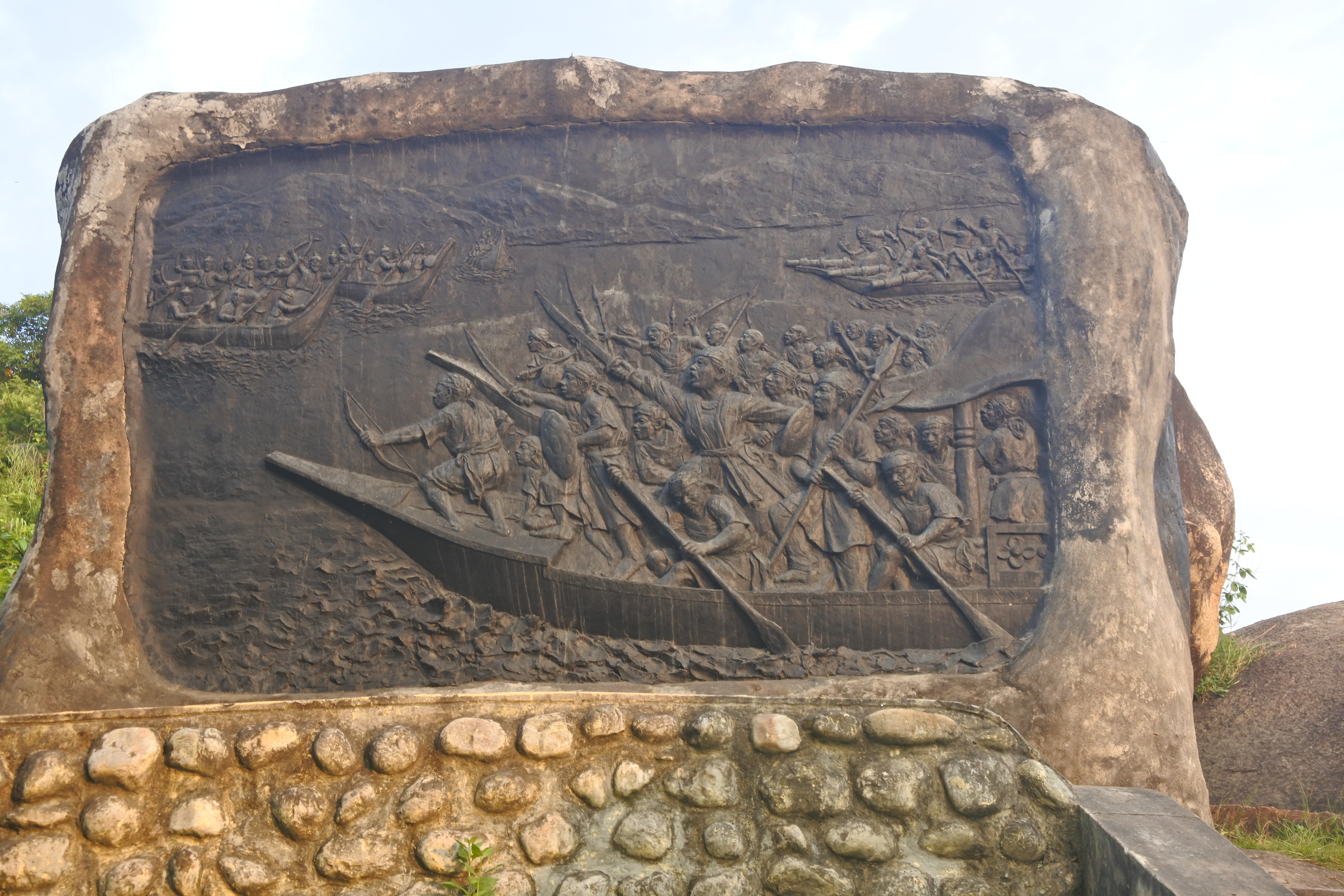
Saraighat battle relief

Meanwhile, Mughal reinforcements in the shape of war vessels and imperial officers (Omraos) reached Ram Singh, along with the Mughal admiral, Munnawar Khan and the Mughal Viceroy Shaista Khan, sent the message that Ram Singh was sent to fight the Assamese, not make friends with them. Ram Singh now made preparations for his final and direct assault on Guwahati and began moving along the north bank. Near Sualkuchi he was joined by ships with artillery and archers under five Mughal captains including two firingis. The Mughals had large boats, some carrying as many as sixteen cannons. The Mughal ambassador, Paditrai, had reported a breach in the embankment at Andharubali a few days earlier, and Ram Singh wanted to exploit this opening. The new king Udayaditya Singha sent an army of 20,000 soldiers under Atan Buragohain from Samdhara to Saraighat. Lachit Borphukan and their admiral were both seriously ill, which demoralized the soldiers, and the Nara Hazarika, the son of the Miri Sandikoi, was in command. An encounter both on land and water ensued near Ashwakranta. The Ahom land forces, under Laluksola Phukan, worsted the Mughals, but the Mughal boats compelled the Ahom boats to retreat to Barhila, north of Saraighat. The land forces, fearing an encirclement, too retreated. The battle reached a crucial phase, when the Mughals were beginning to get close to Andharubali. The Borphukan, as well as the Nara Hazarika, sent messages to inspire the soldiers. It looked as if there was a break in command and some boats began falling back to Kajali and Samdhara. Lachit Barphukan was observing this from his sickbed in the gatehouse of the Itakhuli fort.

At this crucial moment in the battle, when the Mughals were about to land at Andharubali, the Borphukan sent orders via katakis to all the land and naval forces to attack. He also ordered six war-boats for himself and had Nadai of Kharangi carry him to a boat. He shouted "The King has put all the people in my hands to fight the Bongal. Shall I go back to my wife and children?" and pushed a few men into the water. With the other six war-boats the Borphukan headed toward the naval battle.

The entry of the Borphukan transformed the Ahom soldiers. His small flotilla soon swelled with Ahom warships from all sides that smashed into the Mughal warships at Amrajuli on the north bank, opposite Kamakhya hills. The triangle in the river, between Itakhuli, Kamakhya, and Aswakranta was filled with men and boat. The Ahoms spanned the river over an improvised bridge of boats and resorted to a combined front and rear attack. The Mughal admiral Munnawar Khan, smoking a hookah was killed by a gunshot from the back, throwing the Mughals out of gear. They suffered the loss of three top-ranking amirs, and another 4,000 dead. The day of this decisive battle is not known for certain, only that it happened in the middle of March 1671.

== Epilogue ==
The Mughals were pursued to the Manas river, the Ahom kingdom's western boundary. The Borphukan instructed his men not to attack the retreating army, reminding them of Alaboi. Anticipating a counterattack, he set messengers at regular intervals, while Atan Burhagohain and other commanders stood ready for one. The Mughals in Darrang were also worsted, and Ram Singh left Kamrup on 7 April 1671 for Rangamati. Ram Singh waited in vain for another opportunity and finally had an audience with Aurangzeb on 25 June 1676.

Lachit Borphukan died at Kaliabor about a year later in April 1672, but not from the illness at Saraighat. And this was not the final battle between the Ahoms and the Mughals, nor did Guwahati remain with the Ahoms. Lachit Borphukan's own brother and successor Borphukan, Laluk Sola, deserted Guwahati for the Mughals in 1679. It remained with the Mughals until 1682, when the Ahoms under Gadadhar Singha recovered it and ended Mughal control in Kamrup permanently.

== See also ==
- Battle of Samdhara
- Ahom kingdom
- History of India
- Battle of Alaboi
