= Munnawar Khan =

Mughal admiral (died 1671)

Shahid Munawwar Khan
- منور خان
- Born: Agra, Agra Subah, Mughal Empire
- Died: March 1671; Brahmaputra River, Saraighat, Ahom kingdom
- Military career
- Allegiance: Mughal Empire
- Branch: Mughal Navy
- Rank: Admiral
- Conflicts: Conquest of Golconda, Battle of Saraighat †
- Awards: Istishhad (1671)

Munnawar Khan (Persian: منور خان; died March 1671) was a Mughal Empire admiral during the reign of Emperor Aurangzeb.

== Biography ==
Khan was born to a Muslim family in the city of Agra. He entered service during the rule of Mughal Emperor Aurangzeb, during the conquest of Golconda, he first started his naval training by protecting Mughal supply routes in narrow and difficult rivers, he was also promoted as the chief admiral in the Bay of Bengal, he visited Janjira on several occasions. Munnawar Khan was sent on a campaign in the Brahmaputra River against the Ahoms in Assam along with the talented Muhammad Saleh Kamboh, they built trade cog sized Dhows some with artillery, archers and musketeers under five Sardars (admirals), during the Battle of Saraighat. But the Mughal fleet was outnumbered by 3300 Ahom war-canoes. Munnawar Khan was killed by an arrow which struck his backbone, throwing the Mughals out of gear. They suffered the loss of three top-ranking Amirs, and another 4000 dead on that day in 1671.

However, Mughal Admiral Muhammad Saleh Kamboh survived and wrote an account on that tragic encounter against the Ahoms, he noted:

Although much weaker, the Ahom army defeated the Mughal army by use of the terrain, diplomatic negotiations to buy time, guerrilla tactics, psychological warfare, military intelligence and by exploiting weaknesses of the Mughal navy.

== See also ==
- Mughal weapons
- Aurangzeb
- Mir Jumla II
