= Battle of Kaliabor =

Mughal-Ahom battle in 1662

- Part of Mir Jumla's invasion of Assam
- Assam and the river flowing through it
| Date | 3rd March 1662 |
| Location | Kaliabor, Assam 26.32°N 92.53°E |
| Result | Mughal victory |

Belligerents
| Ahom kingdom | Mughal Empire |

Commanders and leaders
| Borgohain (POW) | Mir Jumla II |

The Battle of Kaliabor, also known as Battle of Kaliabar, was a riverine naval battle fought between the Mughal Empire, under the command of its general Mir Jumla II, and the Ahom Kingdom, under the command of Bargohain. The battle was fought on March 3, 1662 near Kaliabor, on the Brahmaputra River situated in modern-day Assam state.

== Background ==
Many wars raged between the Ahom Kingdom and During the Mughal war of succession, the Ahoms seized the opportunity of the civil war to seize Kamrup. After the new Emperor Aurangzeb ascended to the Mughal throne, he appointed Mir Jumla II, one of the Mughal generals from the Deccan who had supported him in the civil war as the Governor of Bengal.

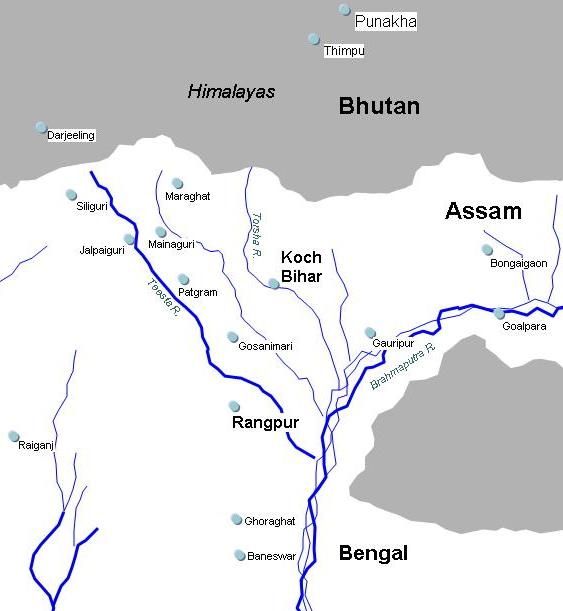
The Map connecting Koch Bihar, Bengal and the Assam

By November 1661, Mir Jumla was ready to begin the campaign, described as "a holy war with the infidels of Assam," as reported by his official news correspondent.

== Preparations and initial conflicts ==
=== The Ahom forces ===
The exact number of war-boats carried by the Ahoms is uncertain as is information on the exact construction of many of them as well as their and manning.

=== The Mughal forces ===
The Mughal governor Mir Jumla gathered a force consisting of 12,000 cavalry, 30,000 foot soldiers, and a flotilla comprising hundreds of vessels. Among these vessels were ten ghurabs, or floating batteries, each carrying fourteen guns and towed by four rowing boats.

=== Capturing Ahom forts ===
The Mughals invasion force upriver slowly investing strategic forts such as at Jogigopa. These were subdued before they proceeded on.

== The Battle ==
The Mughal army reached Kaliabar in the Nowgong district,. Due to the presence of hills along the Brahmaputra River from this point onward, the Mughal army had to move away from the riverbank, and they became disconnected from the fleet. This temporary separation of the invading army from the navy gave the Ahoms with the opportunity they desired to launch an attack. The isolation of the Mughal fleet, along with the unexpected absence of its admiral Ibn Husain (along with some ships) from the main fleet, created favourable conditions for the Ahoms to attack the Mughal fleet.

However the attack proved unsuccessful with the differing construction of Mughal warships as well as a contingent of European ships giving them an advantage.

== Aftermath ==
Many escaping Ahoms were killed by the pursuing Mughal soldiers, who were instructed not to show mercy. The 50 Ahoms who managed to escape were sentenced by their king to undergo severe punishment. Although the Ahom admiral was captured despite his disguise, he was released at the request of some of Mir Jumla's senior officers. The remaining 300 Ahom vessels anchored about a mile away from Mir Jumla's camp, where they were sunk the following day by artillery fire. The Ahom soldiers that fled to the other bank were pursued and some were captured. The effectiveness of the Assamese navy was completely annihilated as a result. This was the most decisive victory of Mir Jumla in his campaign against Ahoms.

Following the battle the Ahom's decided it was not possible to defeat the invasion and abandoned their capital at Gharaghat. Mir Jumla's army would plunder it before being subjected to harsh conditions with the coming of the monsoon season. The war would end the following year with the Treaty of Ghilajharighat.

== Sources ==
- Roy, Atul Chandra (1972). A History of Mughal Navy and Naval Warfares. World Press.
- Sarkar, Jagadish Narayan (1951). The Life of Mir Jumla, the General of Aurangzab. Thacker, Spink.
- Chatterjee, Anjali (1967). Bengal in the Reign of Aurangzib, 1658-1707. Progressive Publishers. ISBN 978-0-8426-1193-0.
- Richards, John F. (1993). The Mughal Empire. Cambridge University Press. ISBN 978-0-521-56603-2.
