= Bishan Singh =

Maharaja of Amber (1672–1699)

Mirza Raja Bishan Singh
- 29th Raja of Amber
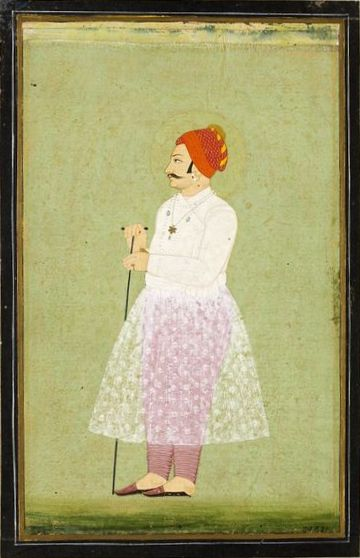
- Painting of Raja Bishan Singh by an unknown artist.

Raja of Amber
- Reign: 30 April 1688 – 19 December 1699
- Predecessor: Ram Singh I
- Successor: Jai Singh II
- Born: c. 1672; Amber, Rajputana
- Died: 31 December 1699 (aged 26–27)
- Spouse: Rathorji Indra Kanwarji of Kharwa in Ajmer Hadiji Ajab Kanwarji of Bundi Chauhanji Phool Kanwarji of Diggi in Amer Chauhanji Bahurang Kanwarji of Moran in Amer Badgujarji Kishan Kanwarji of Deoti in Amer
- Issue: Jai Singh II Vijay Singh Amar Kanwarji, married to Rao Budh Singh of Bundi
- House: Kachhwaha
- Father: Yuvraj Kishan Singh
- Mother: Chauhanji Man Kanwarji of Nimrana in Amber

Mirza Raja Bishan Singh (c. 1672 - 1699) was a Kachwaha ruler of the Kingdom of Amber (also called, the Kingdom of Amer or Dhundhar, or Jaipur State). He succeeded his grandfather Mirza Raja Ram Singh I since his father Kishan Singh died in the lifetime of his grandfather. He was also the Mughal subahdar of the province of Assam from the year 1687 to 1695 during the reign of Emperor Aurangzeb. He was succeeded by Sawai Jai Singh II.

== Accession ==
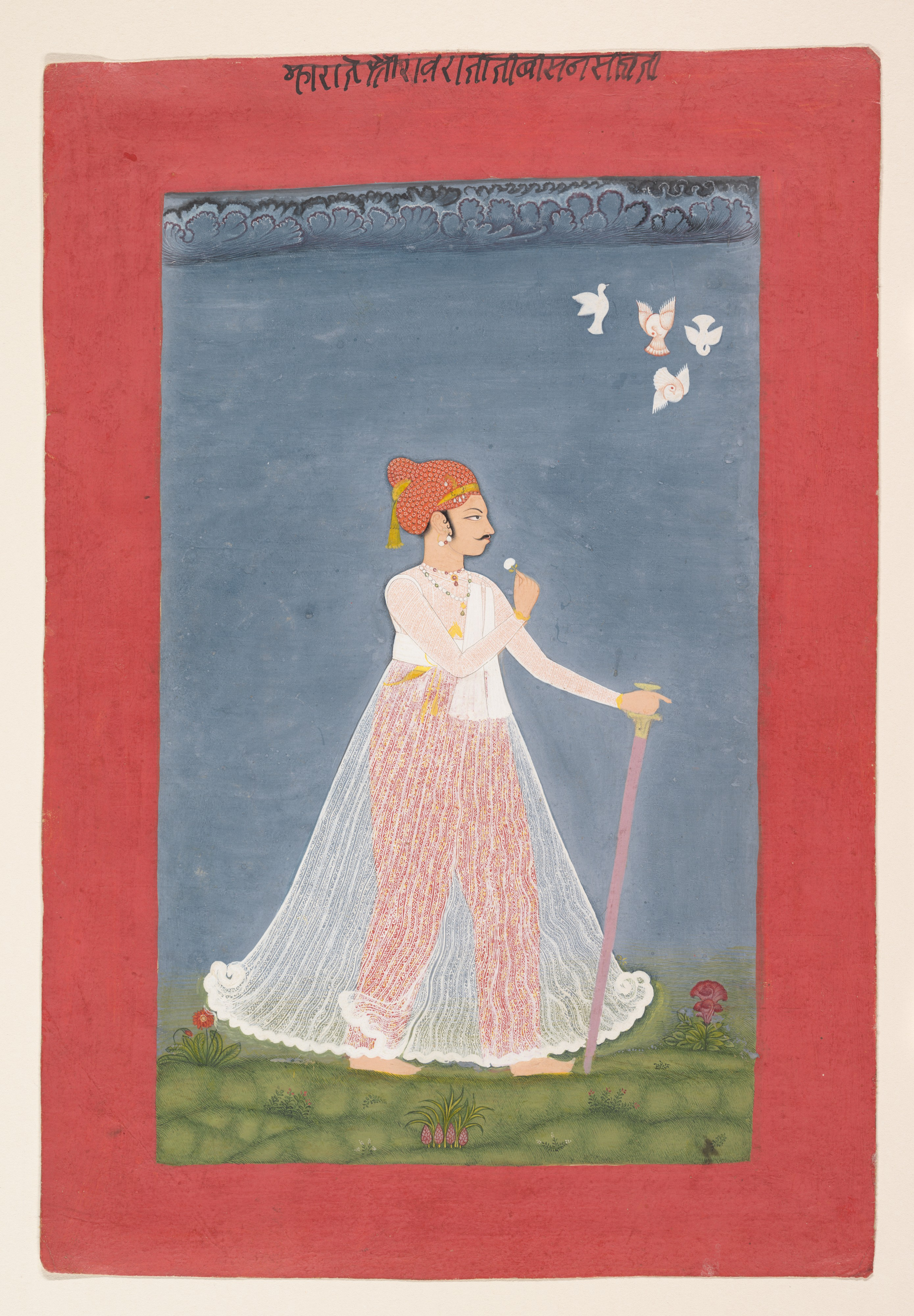
Painting of Bishan Singh in his early years.

On the death of his grandfather Ramsingh I, the 16-year-old Bishan Singh returned to Amer with his Kachwaha clansmen. He had been serving with Ram Singh in Afghanistan, even though the Mughal Emperor Aurangzeb had demanded that he be sent to serve in the Deccan Wars. But remembering the fate of other Hindu princes when serving in the Mughal armies on distant campaigns, Ram Singh had evaded that order. For this he had been demoted in rank and reduced in the possession of some estates. Bishan, on the other hand, was entirely deprived of his rank and lands.

Bishan Singh was thus the first ruler of Amer to sit on the throne without any rank or status in the Mughal nobility. When Aurangzeb recognized Bishan Singh as Raja (30 April 1688), made him commander of 2500 cavalry, and gave him a cash advance for their maintenance, it seemed that the Amer royal family had come out of its dark days. The restoration came with a harsh condition: Bishan Singh was commanded to uproot the Jat rebels in the Agra province or these grants would be revoked.

== Rebellions ==
At this stage, while Aurangzeb was fighting in the Deccan Wars, North India was also covered by strife. The main rebellions were of the Rajputs in Rajasthan, Malwa, Gujarat, Bundelkhand. Only the three weaker states of Amer, Bundi, and Datia were in Mughal service. These were being used mostly against their own brethren by Aurangzeb. The other major rebellions were of the Sikhs in Punjab and the Jats in Agra.

He was appointed faujdar of Mathura and assigned the responsibility of suppressing the Mathura revolt and establishing an outpost for the imperial army fighting the Jats under Bidar Bakht. He did a good job on both tasks, although the campaign of Bidar Bakht in Sinsini was delayed owing to Jat opposition, but in the end, the imperial army triumphed. Mughal and Rajput armies jointly attacked Sinsini and captured it after a struggle of five months, in the month of January 1690. In this war 200 Mughals and 700 Rajputs were killed against 1500 Jats. Bishan Singh also took 500 prisoners from the Jat stronghold of Soghar.

Bishan Singh ruled over the areas of Mathura, Kama, Mahaban prangana up to the Doab's edge, and modern-day Bharatpur. Rajaram died in their own inter-clan feud, while his brothers Churaman and Rupa continued to rebel against Delhi, until then, no Jat kingdom had developed, and the land was populated by Jats who had no recognized authority, allowing Bishan Singh to easily beat them.

Although Sinisini and Soghar were seized, Jats continued to rebel and disturbing the area, making peace impossible since Bishan Singh lacked the resources to manage the entire district, which was filled by hostile Jats. Bishan Singh was accused of negligence by Aurangzeb. Mathura's Faujadari was taken from him.

== Continued pressure from Aurangzeb ==
In 1696 Aurangzeb now commanded Bishan Singh, despite his previous dismissal, to serve in his ruinous Deccan Wars. Bishan pleaded with and bribed Mughal officials, Aurangzeb's sons, and the emperor's favorite daughter Zinat-un-nissa, until the order was changed to a summons for his 7-year-old son Jai Singh II.

Fearing the same fate as his father Kishan Singh, and other Rajput princes, Bishan Singh evaded the order to go to the Deccan for almost two years. Displeased, Aurangzeb transferred Bishan Singh to Afghanistan with half the Kachwaha clan, while the rest were placed under Jai Singh II. The emperor then sent his men to force the child to fight in his wars.

In Afghanistan, Bishan Singh served under Shah Alam who spent every winter in Peshawar and moved to Kabul for the summer. Like his grandfather, Bishan Singh died in this bitterly cold region (31 December 1699).

The child Jai Singh II then came to the throne and raised his family and kingdom (known as Jaipur after him) to the first rank in Rajasthan after an eventful career of 44 years.

== See also ==
- House of Kachwaha

== Sources ==
A History of Jaipur by Sir Jadunath Sarkar
