= Ahom Army =

- Active: During Ahom Era
- Country: Assam, North East India
- Type: Royal Army
- Size: At peak 4,00,000 were raised to invade to bengal
- Engagements: Saraighat, Itakhuli etc.

Commanders
- Notable commanders: Lachit Borphukan

The Ahom Army consisted of cavalry, infantry as well as naval units based on the Paik system militia of the Ahom kingdom. The kingdom did not have standing army units of professional soldiers till late 18th and early 19th centuries, when Purnandan Burhagohain raised one after noticing the effectiveness of Captain Thomas Welsh's sepoys in subjugating the Moamoria rebellion.

The Ahom Army had various confrontations, the most significant ones were against the west, from Bengal Sultans and the Mughal Empire; and against the south from the Konbaung dynasty (Burma). Its won decisive victories against the forces led by Turbak (1532), the Mughal Empire in the Battle of Saraighat (1671), and the final Battle of Itakhuli (1682) that expelled the Mughal forces from Assam. Its major failures were against the army of Chilarai (1553), the forces led by Mir Jumla II (1662), and finally the Burmese invasions of Assam (1817, 1819, 1821). Though the Ahom kingdom withstood all invasions from the west, it fell to the single significant challenge from the south and was destroyed.

== Organization ==
The Ahom Army was based on compulsory participation from members of its Paik system, a corvée labor system the Ahom kingdom followed. Paiks formed groups of 4 (and later 3) called gots, and at least one paik from each got was in military or public services at any given time. Each paik received state land for agriculture, and during the time of his paik services, the other members of his got tended to his land. Male subjects between the ages of fifteen and fifty are compulsory members of the Paik system. Therefore the entire population formed a trained militia on which the Ahom Army was based; and even at times of wars agricultural and other economic activities continued.

Paik officers
Paik Officer	Number of Paiks
Phukan	6000
Rajkhowa	3000
Hazarika	1000
Saikia	100
Bora	20
