= Bharali =

Bharali is a surname from Assam, India. Notable people with the name include:

- Bhabendra Nath Bharali, Indian politician
- Devananda Bharali (1883–1972), Indian linguist, writer, translator and dramatist
- Hema Bharali, Indian freedom activist and social worker
- Uddhab Bharali (born 1962), Indian innovator
