= Ram Singh I =

Raja of Amber from 1667 to 1688

Amir-ul-Umara Mirza Raja Ram Singh I
- Raja
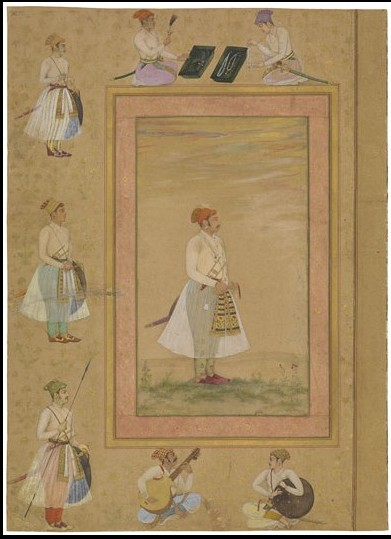

Raja of Amber
- Reign: 28 August 1667 – 10 April 1688
- Coronation: 10 September 1667
- Predecessor: Jai Singh I
- Successor: Bishan Singh
- Born: 22 August 1629; Amber, Rajputana
- Died: 10 April 1688 (aged 58); Kohat, Pakhtunkhwa, Mughal Empire
- Spouse: Hadiji of Kota Rathorji Ram Kanwarji of Marwar Chauhanji Anup Kanwarji of Nimrana in Amber Gaurji of Sheopur in Malwa Bagheliji Shyam Kanwarji of Rewa in Baghelkhand
- Issue: Yuvraj Kishan Singh (died in teenage)
- Dynasty: Kachhwaha
- Father: Jai Singh I
- Mother: Jadonji Anand Kanwarji d.of Raja Mukund Das of Karauli
- Religion: Hinduism

Mirza Raja Ram Singh I (22 August 1629 – 10 April 1688) was the Raja of the Kingdom of Amber from 1667 until his death in 1688. He was the head of the Kachhwaha dynasty, succeeding his father Mirza Raja Jai Singh I. He also served as the general of the Mughal Empire and commander-in-chief of its army as well as the Subahdar of Kashmir.

He was commissioned by the Mughal Emperor Aurangzeb as a commander of 4000 in 1667 to invade the Ahom Kingdom of present-day Assam, but the loss at the Battle of Saraighat (1671) and the subsequent retreat led to his recall to the capital and following disgrace and a downfall in rank and order at the imperial Mughal court which though lasted for a short span of time, rejuvenated by his great-grandson Maharaja Sawai Jai Singh II in the beginning of 18th century.

== Escape of Shivaji ==
After the incomplete Mughal invasion of Bijapur in 1665, Maratha king Shivaji was sent to the Mughal court in Agra on 12 May 1666. Shivaji was offended by being made to stand alongside relatively low-ranking nobles, stormed out of the court, and was promptly placed under house arrest. Ram Singh was granted custody of Shivaji and his son Sambhaji.

Shivaji's situation under house arrest was precarious. Aurangzeb's court deliberated whether to execute him or keep him as a servant. Jai Singh, having assured Shivaji of his personal safety, tried to influence Aurangzeb's decision. However, Aurangzeb intended to kill Shivaji and ordered Faulad Khan to transfer Shivaji from Ram Singh's custody to the house of Radanaza Khan. Ram Singh refused to deliver over Shivaji because of his father's promise of safety to Shivaji and said he should be slain first to kill Shivaji. Aurangzeb made him to sign security bond for Shivaji.

Shivaji devised a strategy to secure his freedom with help of Ram Singh and his connections. He ordered the majority of his troops home and urged Ram Singh to withdraw his pledges to the emperor for the safe custody of himself and his son. Shivaji escaped and left Agra on 17 August 1666 with the help of undercover agents from Kingdom of Amer, by putting himself in one of the enormous baskets and his son Sambhaji in another.Vijay Singh and his men (who worked for Jai Singh) took shivaji out of Agra with proper planning.

After Shivaji's escape, Ram Singh was accused of assisting Shivaji's escape and was punished, first by being barred from entering court and subsequently by being demoted.

== Campaign in Assam ==
It is believed that Ram Singh was sent to lead a military campaign in Assam against the Ahom Kingdom as his punishment, for allegedly assisting Shivaji to escape from the captivity at Agra. Service in Assam was very unpopular in the Mughal court and no soldier have been gone there unless compelled. Ram Singh was accompanied by 4000 Rajput troops, 1500 ahadis, 500 Mughal artillerymen and 15,000 archers sent from Koch Behar. However, he attempted peace negotiations in 1670 after the Battle of Alaboi but failed. After the Battle of Saraighat, he retired to Rangamati and left Bengal and returned to the Mughal court in 1676.

== Death ==
Ram Singh grew sick of war and finally, in 1676 he was allowed to leave and return to his province. He was later posted to quell the rebellion of the Pashtuns in Kohat where he died in 1688. He was succeeded by his grandson Bishan Singh as the Raja of Amber.

== Popular culture ==
=== Films and television ===
- In the 2026 Indian Marathi-language historical film Ranapati Shivray: Swari Agra, he is portrayed by Rishi Saxena.

== See also ==
- House of Kachwaha
- Mughal Empire
- Ahom-Mughal conflicts
- Battle of Saraighat
