= Treaty of Ghilajharighat =

1663 treaty between the Ahoms and Mughals

- Context: Ahom–Mughal wars
- Signed: 23 January 1663; 363 years ago
- Location: Tipam
- Original signatories: Mir Jumla II; Jayadhwaj Singha
- Parties: Mughal Empire; Ahom Kingdom
- Languages: Assamese and Persian

The Treaty of Ghilajharighat, Tipam, was signed between the Ahoms and the Mughal forces led by Mir Jumla II on 23 January 1663. The treaty was signed at the end of Mir Jumla's invasion of Assam of 1662–1663. Though the signing of the treaty led to Mir Jumla and his army's retreat from the Ahom territories, the treaty terms were only partially fulfilled; the Ahoms felt humiliated by the tributary status that the treaty sought to impose on them and they followed it with wins in the Battle of Saraighat (1671) and Battle of Itakhuli (1682) that saw the Mughals interests pushed out of the Brahmaputra valley for ever.

== Background ==
The Ahom-Mughal conflicts began in the year 1615. After a series of battles the limits of the Mughal and Ahom interests were settled in the Treaty of Asurar Ali (1639)—with the Mughals to the west of the Barnadi river in the north bank of the Brahmaputra and the Asurar Ali in the south bank, and the Ahoms to the west. The Mughal interests were protected by a faujdar stationed first at Hajo and then at Guwahati.

Taking advantage of the confusion during the Mughal war of succession (1658–1659) when Shah Shuja, the subahdar of Bengal, was on the way to Delhi making his claim to the Mughal throne Pran Narayan, the king of Koch Bihar, attacked the Mughal faujdar Mir Lufullah Shiraji then stationed in Guwahati. The faujdar, sandwiched between the Koches and the Ahoms, abandoned his post in February-March 1659. The Koches occupied Guwahati and offered the Ahoms a partition of Kamrup and an alliance against the Mughals. The Ahoms, under Jayadhwaj Singha, refused the offer, pushed the Koches away, and took possession of the entire Brahmaputra up to the Sankosh River. That the Ahoms took western Assam from the Koches and not the Mughals became a key diplomatic argument in nearly all subsequent Ahom negotiations.

After Aurangzeb came to power his general, Mir Jumla II, chased Shah Shuja back to Bengal and defeated him in 1660 who then escaped to the Arakans (Kingdom of Mrauk U). Aurangzeb made Mir Jumla the subahdar of Bengal and with his instructions Mir Jumla decided to first take Koch Bihar and Assam. He set out for Koch Bihar in November 1661.

=== Mir Jumla's invasion of Assam ===
After occupying the Koch capital on 19 December 1661 and annexing it to the Mughal Empire, Mir Jumla turned his focus on the Ahom kingdom. He recovered the region of Kamrup, including Guwahati (then on the north bank of Brahmaputra) on 5 February 1662 and pushed into the Ahom territory as determined by the Treaty of Asurar Ali (1639) on 7 February 1662. After the Mughals won some significant battles at Samdhara, Simalugarh, and Kukurakata (above Kaliabor), the Ahoms had no major fort to defend the capital and took to guerrilla warfare (Assamese: daga-juddha) as devised by Atan Burhagohain. The Ahoms at this point sent peace offers which Mir Jumla refused. After some more defeats the Ahom king left the capital, Garhgaon, for Charai-Khorong (Charaideo) and Mir Jumla occupied it on 17 March 1662. Placing Garhgaon under Mir Murtaza and the opposite bank of the Dikau River under Jalal Khan, Mir Jumla stationed himself at Mathurapur, about 10 kilometers southeast of the capital to plot the Ahom king's capture.

Mir Jumla nevertheless struggled to establish control. He established outposts (thana) at different places and tried, without success, to lure high Ahom officials to his side. The rainy season started soon (in April) and the entire countryside turned into marshy land rendering the fearsome Mughal cavalry ineffective. The Mughal forces were imprisoned by water, faced food shortage and a cholera epidemic in their camps. The local population was hostile; the Ahom forces began a series of guerrilla and psychological warfare, and regained some control and nearly recaptured the capital; but they were unable to drive the Mughals away.

=== Climactic of the invasion ===
After the rains stopped the Mughal conditions improved vastly - the logistic lines became operational again and the Mughal cavalry found solid ground by the end of October 1662 - and the Ahom king and his court had to retreat to Namrup. Then Mir Jumla received a proposal for peace from Baduli Phukan (the then commander-in-chief) via Mir Murtaza; he rejected the offer since he wanted the Ahom king to surrender unconditionally. Both Baduli Phukan and Atan Buragohain had to abandon their forts and retreat to safer grounds by the second half of November 1662. At this point Mir Jumla fell ill, most likely from tuberculosis.

==== Defection by Baduli Phukan ====
Baduli Phukan, the Ahom military's commander-in-chief, coming into some differences with the Ahom king's father-in-law Rajshahur Rajmantri Phukan, switched sides and joined Mir Jumla at the end of November. He claimed that since he was the commander-in-chief of the Ahom forces, the Ahom king will not be able to offer any resistance. Mir Jumla crowned him "Deka Raja" (junior king), and gave him command of the region between Garhgaon and Namrup. Led by Baduli Phukan and his followers, Mir Jumla then advanced and reached hilly Tipam by December 18. But here he faced problems of an aggravating illness, and a worn out Mughal army eager to return home—fearful of the hilly terrain.

==== Ahom proposal for peace ====
The Ahoms were not aware of Mir Jumla's deteriorating health, nor about the restiveness in the Mughal army. Jayadhwaj Singha installed Atan Buragohain as the rajmantri, and in desperation instructed him to either remove the Mughals or he, the king, would retire to Mong Kawng, Atan Buragohain persuaded the king that fighting the Mughals now was futile, and that the Ahoms should sue for a settlement. Subsequently, Atan Buragohain and the Rajshahur Rajmantri sent four emissaries—Sultan, Chaturbhuj Kakati, Chandrai, and Kamal—to the Mughal camp with presents and a proposal that the Ahom will pay a tribute (peshkash) if the Mughals vacated Assam.

== Treaty negotiations ==
Mir Jumla had earlier rejected all peace proposals that did not include an unconditional surrender by the king. Since his forces' position was precarious and had the Ahoms begun guerrilla campaigns then he himself would have had to quit Assam, the latest proposal from the Ahoms came as a surprise to him. He accepted this as an opportunity to extract himself from an uneviable position, partly because of the grim realities facing the Mughal forces and partly because of Dilir Khan's persuasion. He continued to bluff and maintained a stronger position—he refused the presents and together with Dilir Khan sent back two emissaries—Gadai Barkaith and Bhormal—to Atan Buragohain and Rashahur Rajmantri. Baduli Phukan, alarmed at the peace negotiations, met with Mir Jumla and tried to scuttle them by attacking Ahom forces with a combined Mughal and Assamese force, but he was defeated, and all chances of a Mughal victory ended. Mir Jumla delegated the negotiation to Dilir Khan, who persuaded him to accept the offers, even as he asked for more submissions from the Ahoms. On the Ahom's side, the treaty was negotiated primarily by Atan Buragohain.

The treaty was signed at Panibat of Tipam, a little upstream from Joypur on the bank of the Dihing River in the last week of December 1662.

== Terms of the treaty ==
The terms of the treaty are collated from Persian and Assamese sources, and there are some inconsistencies between them - with some exaggerations in some of them. According to the treaty, Jayadhwaj Singha agreed

1. to accept Mughal vassalage and place an Ahom noble at Guwahati with a contingent of paiks
2. to send his own daughter, Ramani Gabharu, to the imperial harem accompanied by the daughter of the Tipam raja
3. to place a dowry of 20,000 tolas of gold, 1,20,000 tolas of silver, and 20 dressed elephants, 15 for Mir Jumla, 5 for Diller Khan, including 14 tuskers, for the Mughal emperor
4. to pay a war indemnity of 300,000 tolas of silver within a year; 90 elephants (including 20 tuskers and 10 females) in three quarterly installments,
5. to pay an annual tribute of 20 elephants (10 tuskers and 10 females)
6. to send four hostages (a son each of the Burhagohain, the Borgohain, the Borpatrogohain, and the Garhgoia Phukan) to be held till the payment of war indemnity and the elephants in installments.
7. to return the region between the Manas River to the Guwahati to the Mughals and to cede the following regions:
  1. the region from Guwahati to Samdhara on the Bharali River in the north bank of the river Brahmaputra; and
  2. the region from Guwahati to the Kolong River in the south bank
8. to release the captives from Kamrup and the imprisoned family of Badali Phukan (who had defected to the Mughal side)
9. to submit a dowry of 1,000 tolas of gold and 120,000 tolas of silver for the Tipam princess (though mentioned in the Persian sources, there is no mention of this in the Assamese sources).

== Aftermath ==
The Ahom king sent his daughter on 5 January 1663, along with the gold, silver and part of the elephant contingent the Ahoms had promised, with the promise to send the rest of the elephants before the Mughals reached Lakhau. Mir Jumla issued the order to retreat from Tipam on 10 January 1663. Due to his illness he moved by palanquins and boats. At Lakhau, Mir Jumla left Dilir Khan to receive the rest of the elephants.

Of the four hostage sons in the terms of the treaty, only three were released to the Mughals: Dhala Gohain (son of the Borgohain), Maupia (son of Rajshahur Garhgoia Barphukan) and Langi Gohain (son of the Borpatrogohain). The son of the Buragohain had smallpox and another had died a few days ago. The hostages were left with Rashid Khan at Guwahati, where he was appointed as the faujdar of Sarkar Kamrup.

Though the Ahoms released all Mughal soldiers that were captured, the Mughals took away some who were captives. The captives who were taken off by the Assamese at the beginning of the campaign were settled in Kamrup. Baduli Phukan was given a parganah in a sarkar in Bengal.

=== Deaths ===
Mir Jumla died on board the boat he was traveling back on 31 March 1663, about 4 miles from Khizrpur.

After the departure of the Mughals, Jayadhwaj Singha came down from Namrup after February 1663, and established a new capital at Bakata, about five miles from the ruined capital of Garhgaon. He began rehabilitating the country with the help of Atan Buragohain, but he died in November 1663. Since he had no son his cousin Chakra, the Charing Raja, became the next king.

== Impact ==
The Treaty of Ghilajharighat was the root cause of subsequent Ahom-Mughal conflicts, especially the aggressive Ahom maneuvers of 1667, the subsequent campaign of Ram Singh culminating in the Mughal defeat of Battle of Saraighat (1671) and the retaking of Guwahati by the Ahoms.

Neither Jayadhwaj Singha nor the successor Ahom king Chakradhar Singha could accept Mughal vassalage and tributary status.

== See also ==
- Treaty of Asurar Ali
- List of treaties
