= Itakhuli =

Hill near Guwahati, Assam, India

Itakhuli or Sukreswar Hill is a small hill on the south bank of the Brahmaputra at Guwahati. The past official residence of the Deputy Commissioner of Kamrup District of Assam was located on top of this hill. The D.C. bungalow was vacated for the Brahmaputra river side development. Adjacent to it on the western side of the D.C. bungalow is the Sukreswar Temple. Itakhuli hill has always been of strategic importance. It was the seat of the viceroys and a garrison since the early days of Kamrup from Ahom, to Mughal and to the British. The lawns on the back side of the D.C. Bungalow afford a panoramic view of Brahmaputra River with the Karmanakha rocks and Uma Nanda Temple on the Peacock island in the middle, with hills of Nilachal or Kamakhya on the west and Agiathuri hills far off in the north west, Manikarneswar hill and Aswaklanta on the north bank of the river, the Kurua hills on the northeast.

== See also ==
- Battle of Itakhuli
