= Treaty of Asurar Ali =

1639 treaty between Ahom and Mughal

The Treaty of Asurar Ali in early February 1639 was signed between the Mughal faujdar Allah Yar Khan and the Ahom general Momai Tamuli Borbarua. The treaty came at the end of a period of Mughal efforts to drive into the Ahom kingdom that began in 1615, and followed a decisive Ahom victory over the Mughals at Duimunisila in November 1638. According to the treaty, the boundary between the Mughals and Ahoms was fixed on the Barnadi River on the northern bank (utarkul) of the Brahmaputra River and the Asurar Ali (Ali is causeway in Assamese) on the southern bank (dakhinkul), believed to be the Rajgarh Road in Guwahati, the causeway or the high Garh was in existence until the late 60's. The Ahom king recognized the supremacy of the Mughals in Kamrup, and the Mughal fauzdar agreed not to interfere in the Ahom kingdom. Trade and commerce between the two regions was permitted with the Ahom kingdom represented by Kanu Sharma and Sanatan, and the Mughal represented by Sheikh Meda. The treaty gave Mughals western Assam, from Guwahati to Manas River to the Mughals.

== See also ==
- Treaty of Ghilajharighat (1662)
- List of treaties
