= Saraighat =

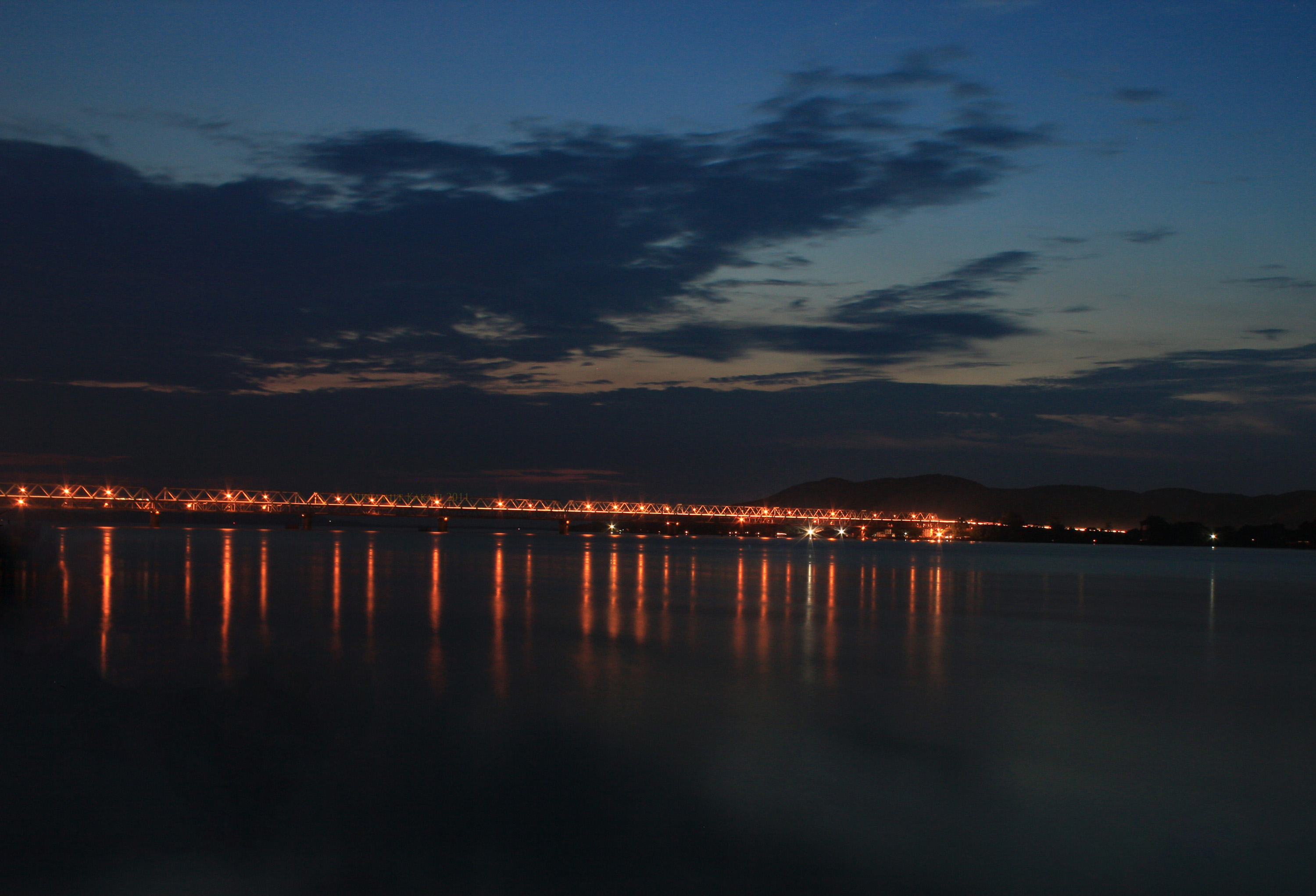
- Dusk over Saraighat Bridge

- Location in Assam, India Saraighat (India)
- Coordinates: 26°10′33″N 91°40′20″E
- Country: India
- State: Assam
- District: Kamrup
- Bridge Constructed by: The Braithwaite, Burn & Jessop Construction Company Limited

Languages
  - Official: Assamese
- Time zone: UTC+5:30 (IST)
- ISO 3166 code: IN-AS
- Vehicle registration: AS
- Coastline: 0 kilometres (0 mi)

Saraighat (Assamese pronunciation: [xɔ.ɹaɪ.ɡʰat]) is a neighborhood in the Indian city of Guwahati, on the north bank of the river Brahmaputra, North Guwahati. Sarai was a small village where the old abandoned N.F. Railway station of Amingaon, North Guwahati was located.

== History ==
The Battle of Saraighat between Ahom Kingdom and Mughal Empire was fought near this place on the river in 1671.

== Transport ==
There are two bridge over the river Brahmaputra joining the north and south banks at Saraighat. The Old Saraighat Bridge is the first rail-cum-road bridge constructed over the Brahmaputra River in Assam. Adjacent New Saraighat Bridge is a road only bridge. Lachit Borphukan Park is situated on the south end and Chilarai Park situated on the north end of the bridge.

Old Saraighat Bridge: Initially planned in 1910, and proposal gained momentum during the Second World War though there were doubts over the stability of the railway line between Bongaigaon and Amingaon following devastating floods in 1942-43, the Railway Minister announced the decision to construct thebridge in the Budget session of the Parliament in 1958. Built by Northeast Frontier Railway under the direction of chief engineer Bankim Chandra Ganguli, the Hindustan Construction Company built the foundations and piers for the bridge, and Braithwaite Burn and Jessop company built the double-warren trusses between the piers and the shore. Construction of Saraighat Bridge was started in the dry season of 1958-59. The bridge was completed in September 1962 and the first engine rolled across it on 23 September 1962, followed by Goods Train service from 31 October that year. The roadway opened in March 1963. Prime Minister Jawaharlal Nehru dedicated the bridge and formally named it after the Battle of Saraighat on 7 June 1963. Total cost of construction was around Rs 10.65 crore and the total length of it is 4258 feet. The road is 24 feet wide with six feet wide footpath on both sides. Bridge has 12 spans and 14,000 tonnes of steel, 4.2 cubic feet concrete, and 40,000 tonnes of cement. 100 million cubic feet of earthwork were used to construct the bridge. A 40 feet clearance is kept from the normal high flood level to ensure free navigation under the bridge. In April 2012, the Railways entrusted the IIT Guwahati with the responsibility of studying the effect of age on the bridge. The experts gave the opinion that the structure and all the pillars of the bridge are in sound condition and the bridge would be able to serve the North East region of the country for years to come.

New Saraighat Bridge: A companion three-lane concrete road bridge was inaugurated in 2017.

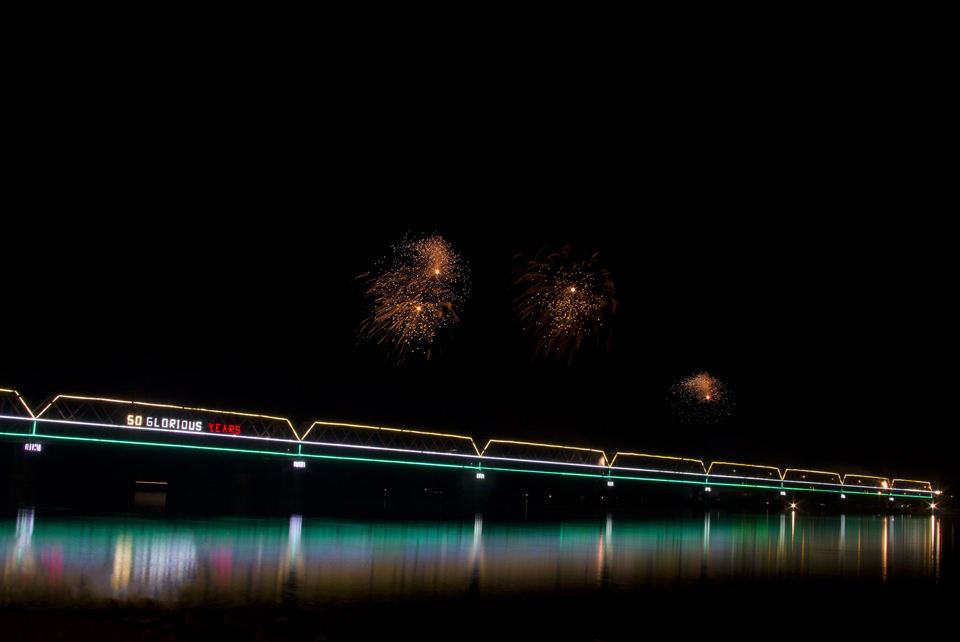
Saraighat Bridge on 6 November 2012 during celebrations for its fiftieth anniversary.

== See also ==
- List of longest bridges in the world
- List of longest bridges above water in India
