= Battle of Itakhuli =

1682 battle during the Mughal-Ahom war

- Part of the Ahom-Mughal conflicts
| Date | 15–16 August 1682 |
| Location | Guwahati |
| Result | Ahom victory |
| Territorial changes | Ahoms reconquer lands unto the Manas River |

Belligerents
| Ahom kingdom | Mughal Empire |

Commanders and leaders
| Dihingia Alun Borbarua | Mansur Khan; Ali Akbar; Jayanta Singh |

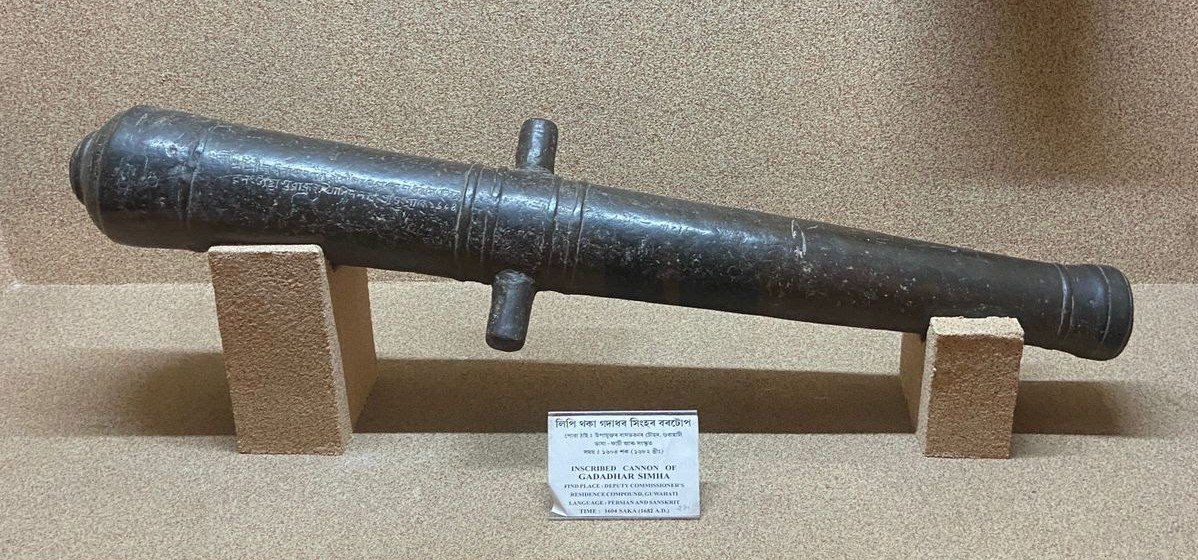
Captured cannon from the Mughals after the battle of Itakhuli

The Battle of Itakhuli was fought in August 1682 between the Ahom Kingdom and the Mughal Empire in an area that is in modern-day Assam. The Ahoms pushed back Mughal control to the west of the Manas River. The main battle was fought at a garrison island on the Brahmaputra, in which the Mughal fauzdar, Mansur Khan, was defeated and the remnant of the Mughal forces pursued to the Manas River. With this win, the Ahoms recovered Sarkar Kamrup from the Mughals.

== Ahom preparations ==
After Gadadhar Singha became the Ahom king in 1681, preparations began in March 1682 for a war to expel the Mughals from Guwahati. An army was organized under the Dihingiya Alun Barbarua. A three-pronged advance was made in June and July 1682: under the commands of Holou Deka-Phukan and the Namdangiya Phukan along the north bank of the Brahmaputra River; under Garhgayan Sanikoi Neog Phukan and Khamrak Charingiya Phukan along the south bank; and the navy under Bandar Barphukan and Champa Paniphukan.

== Mughal defences and battles ==
The Mughals were at a disadvantage, with the faujdar Mansur Khan ill, and widespread discontent among the soldiers. The Imperial attention was focused elsewhere: Aurangzeb, the Mughal emperor, was drawn toward the Deccan due to the Mughal–Maratha Wars (1680–1707), and the Subah of Bengal was busy with its dispute with the East India Company. As the Ahom forces advanced, the Mughals retreated from the advance outposts—Bahbari and Kurua on the north bank and Kajali and Panikhaiti on the south bank—to the fort of Itakhuli. The Ahoms now cast their focus on Shah Buruz on the north bank (Salal Borgohain, Bandar Borphukan, the Sadiyakhowa Gohain, the Marangikhowa Gohain, and others) and on Itakhuli on the south bank (Dihingiya Borbarua, Saring Phukan, and others posted at the Sarania fort). The Pani Phukan kept his fleet at the mouth of the Barnadi River.

The only contested battle was fought when Ali Akbar, the commander of Itakhuli, attacked the Ahom forces at the Sarania fort, but he had to retreat after heavy losses. This prompted the faujdar Mansur Khan to desert the fort (17 July 1682). At this, the Ahoms advanced to Itakhuli and besieged it. A naval battle was fought at Paniduar on 15 August 1682 between the Dihingia Rajkhowa (Ahom) and Jayanta Singha (Mughal), with the defeat and surrender of Jayanta, leaving the garrison at Itakhuli without any naval support.

Unable to sustain his position, Ali Akbar abandoned Itakhuli with his forces the next day at dawn, met with Masur Khan at Guwahati, and retreated to Rangamati secretly by boat. The cavalry—under Indradaman, Dalan Singh, and Kabir Khan—retreated by land, pursued by the Borbarua by land and water up to the Manas River. The evacuated fort of Itakhuli was then occupied by the Chetia Borphukan.

== Aftermath of the war ==
The war spoils were enormous—pearls, gold, silver, copper, brass, lead, weapons and animals of war. Among the prisoners, the cousins of Raja Ramsingh were released, but the Bhatdhara Phukan, brother of the late Laluksola Borphukan who had abandoned Guwahati, was ghoulishly killed.

With the fall of Itakhuli, the Ahom kingdom quickly occupied the region up to Manas River, and set up administration under the Borphukan, with his headquarters at Guwahati.
