= Battle of Dhai Ali =

- Part of Moamoria rebellion
Date	May 1794
Location	Present-day Sivasagar town on the road called Dhai Ali 26°59′12″N 94°37′13″E
Result	British/Ahom Victory

Belligerents
East India Company; Ahom Dynasty	Moamorias

Commanders and leaders
Captain Welsh; Gaurinath Singha	Bharath Singha; Godha Barbarua

Casualties and losses
Light	Heavy
- Location within Assam Battle of Dhai Ali (India)

The Battle of Dhai Ali was fought between Captain Welsh of East India Company and the Moamorias led by Bharath Singha (the Raja of Rangpur), reinforced by a contingent of troops sent to his aid by the Bengmara chief Sarbananda Singha. It was the last encounter between Captain Welsh and the Moamorias before his recallment. The site of the battle is in present-day Sivasagar town on the road called Dhai Ali. (Note: The battle took place at Sibsagar on the road called Dhai Ali near the site of the lines occupied by the Assam Light Infantry from 1840 to 1843.) According to the Assamese traditions, Captain Welsh's last encounter with the Moamorias was a severe and decisive one.

Ahom king Gaurinath Singha watched this engagement from Rang Ghar near his palace enclosure. (Note: Gaurinath Singha watched the battle from the Ranghar with the wife of Capt. Welsh and guarded by a force.) Visheswar Vaidyadhip, the author of Belimarar Buranji described the battle with epical vigor:

The contest was a terrible one and the smoke from the British guns clouded the sky, and the earth was littered with corpses like palm fruits at the end of tempest, Bharathi (Bharath) lost a finger and he fled from the battlefield with Godha and the remnant of his force.

— Visheswar Vaidyadhip, Belimarar Buranji

In this engagement, the Moamorias were finally repulsed from Rangpur.

== See also ==
- Moamoria rebellion
- Ahom Kingdom

== Bibliography ==
- Dutta, Sristidhar (1985), The Mataks and their Kingdom, Allahabad: Chugh Publications
- Baruah, S L (1985), A Comprehensive History of Assam, Munshiram Manoharlal
- Bhuyan, S.K. (1949), Anglo-Assamese Relations, 1771-1826, Department of Historical and Antiquarian Studies in Assam
