= Moamoria rebellions =

18th century uprising in Ahom kingdom of present-day Assam

Moamoria Rebellion
Date	1769–1770, 1782, 1786–1805
Location	Assam
Result	Severe weakening of the Ahom kingdom; Near-end of the Paik system; Creation of a standing army of mostly paid Hindustani sepoys to replace the Ahom paik based military force; Half of the country depopulated
Territorial changes	Creation of autonomous Matak rajya

Belligerents
Moamoria	Ahom dynasty

Commanders and leaders
Ragha Neog; Naharkhora Saikia; Govinda Gaonburha; Pitambardev; Sarbananda Singha; Bharath Singha	Sunyeophaa; Suhitpangphaa; Suklingphaa; Ghanashyam Burhagohain; Purnanada Burhagohain; Kirti Chandra Borbarua

The Moamoria rebellion (1769–1805) was an 18th-century uprising in Ahom kingdom of present-day Assam that began as power struggle between the Moamorias (Mataks), the adherents of the Vaishnavite Mayamara Satra, and the Ahom kings. This uprising spread widely to other sections of Ahom kingdom including disgruntled elements of the Ahom aristocracy leading to two periods in which the Ahom king lost control of the capital. Retaking the capital was accompanied by a massacre of subjects, leading to a steep depopulation of large tracts. The Ahom king failed to retake the entire kingdom; a portion in the north-east, Bengmara (modern-day Tinsukia district), became known as Matak Rajya ruled by a newly created office called Borsenapati, became a tribute-paying but virtually independent territory.

The Ahom kingdom emerged from the rebellion much weakened. About half of the population of the kingdom perished and the economy was totally destroyed. The weakened Ahom kingdom fell to a Burmese invasion which ultimately led to colonization by the British.

== Background ==
This rebellion was primarily among the Moamoria Paiks against the Ahom kingdom. The Moamorias were the followers of the Moamaria sattra that was predominantly Morans (the mainstay of the Ahom militia), but there were also the Sonowal Kacharis (gold-washers), Chutias (expert archers and matchlockmen), professional castes such as Hiras (potters), Tantis (weavers), Kaibartas (fishermen), Bania (artisans) and Ahom nobles and officers. The rising popularity of Moamoria sattra had siphoned off the power of orthodox Hindu groups and Shakti sect which supported the Ahom kings. The Satras provided refuge for those seeking to escape the Paik system under which, any able-bodied person who was not a Brahmin or a noble could be used for labour, services or conscripted into the army. The Ahom kingdom was entering a crisis, as the Paik system on which the state was based was unable to adapt to the changing economy and the emerging social classes. The rise of the Satras was one of the reason for the leakage of manpower from the Paik system, and as a result the Ahom kingdom and the Satras came into increasing conflict. Mayamara satra belonged to the non-conformist Kala-samhati sect that competed against the royalist satras belonging to other sects. The Ahom kingdom watched the growth of this Satra with discomfort and heaped insult and repression on the followers of this satra. The Moamoria Rebellion started during the reign of Swargadeo Sunyeophaa and ended during the reign of Swargadeo Suklingphaa. It continued up to 36 years, from 1769 to 1805.

In the course of time, the Moamoria guru compromised with the Ahom rulers and the rebels drew inspiration from magico-religious cult of night worshipers, a mixture of tribal fertility rites and Tantrism.

== First rebellion ==
On September 15, 1769, Raghav Moran (Ragha Neog), a leading disciple of the Satra and a leader of Morans, was flogged by Ahom officials for not supplying the required number of elephants. This acted as the transgressing point and blessed by their spiritual head, the Morans raised the standard of revolt after collecting an army of about seven thousand. By November, the Morans led by Ragha Neog, Naharkhora Saikia and his two wives Radha and Rukmini, promised the throne to three exiled Ahom princes (Mohanmala Gohain, and two sons of Suremphaa) and with their help liberated the territory north of the Burhidihing river. On November 21, 1769, the rebels occupied the Ahom capital and placed Ramakanta, son of Naharkhora, on the throne. All high offices were thrown open only to Morans and the princes poisoned by deceit. The Ahom king, Sunyeophaa, was captured and kept a prisoner. All high officers were executed and three common Morans became the three great Gohains. Ragh Neog became the Borbarua, a kanri paik became the Borphukan and two common Ahoms became the Gohains at Sadiya and Marangi.

The rebel leaders went to pay homage to the abbot of Mayamara Satra, which was the source of unity among the rebels. Heavy penalty was imposed on the royalist satras, also they were forced to pay homage to the Mayamara abbot.

The rebels, inexperienced in statecraft, failed to usher in a new order. Instead, they began imitating the unpopular practices of their erstwhile leaders. Raghav Moran seized the wives and daughters of many nobles and kept them in his harem. As some of the rebel officers took on the airs of the old nobility, many rebels were dissatisfied and, led by Govinda Gaoburha, left the capital and reached Sagunmuri.

After four months of rebel regime, there came the spring festival (bohag bihu). The peasant soldiers who were voluntarily guarding the capital left their posts to visit their villages, so the defense of the capital got weakened and thus vulnerable. Taking advantage of this, some of the old nobility in disguise killed Ragha on April 14, 1770, with the help of Kuranganayani, an Ahom queen from Manipur, and retook the capital. In the purge that followed, Ramakanta the rebel king, Naharkhora, Radha, Rukmini, Astabhujdev, the Moamara sattradhikar and his son Saptabhuj were all executed.

After the capital was recaptured the remaining rebel forces in Sagunmuri under Govinda Gaoburha attempted to overthrow the king again. This movement too had the signs of a popular uprising. The main weapons used by the rebels were bamboo staves and clubs, and their slogan was praja-oi joroiroa, chekani-oi sopai dhora ("Ye oppressed subjects, hold your stave close"), and this uprising was called chekani kubua ron ("The war of the staves"). In one of the engagements, the Borpatrogohain and the Dhekial Phukan were killed, and the Borgohain made a hair breath escape. The rebels advanced toward Rangpur and they were met at Thowra by the forces of the Burhagohain, the new Borpatrogohain, the Borgohain and a detachment cavalry from the Manipur king. In this battle the rebels were defeated; Govinda Gaoburha was captured and executed. The remaining people were then separated and settled at different places. One of the last holdouts, Nomal, was finally captured and executed.

== Second rebellion ==
On the night of April 1782, in the festive atmosphere of bohag Bihu, the Moamarias launched a surprise attack on the royal convoy of newly crowned king Suhitpangphaa by mixing with the royal attendants and torch bearers and launched their quest for killing the king under the veil of darkness. The Moamarias mistook the king to have been killed but actually he somehow managed to escape the assault and took shelter in a hideout. The rebels then advanced towards Rangpur, overcame the resistance offered by the city-guards and occupied it. In the meantime, a strong body of royalist under the head of Ghanashyam Burhagohain wrested the rebels out of Rangpur. This was followed by an indiscriminate massacre of the Moamorias, rejecting any kind of conciliatory policy. Several thousands of people along with innocents were killed and many escaped and sought refuge in the hills and neighbouring Kingdoms, this had an adverse effect on the production system and the economy was on the verge of collapse. The massacres were finally suspended at the request of the courtiers.

== Third rebellion ==
The scattered Moamarias now reorganized themselves with Dafala-Bhatias under one Harihar and broke in rebellion in 1786 from the foot of Daphla Hills. They defeated the royalist force at Garaimari bil and other places. Then freed Pitambar, a relation to the previous Mayamara abbot and persuaded to join them, who did it after allegedly performing a Brahmayagna (Brahman–slaying sacrifice). The rebels then burnt the Satras of Garmur, Auniati and Dakhinpat (all royalist Satras in Majuli), headed by Brahmanas, and also executed the abbots of Bareghar and Budhbari Satras, which belonged to Kala-Samathi for collaborating with the royalist. At Pahumara the rebels routed the troops sent by the vassal states of Rani, Luki, Beltola and Topakuchi and further advanced and defeated the Burhagohain at Sagunmari, making him retreat to Rangpur. The rebels got momentum to pillage villages in the vicinity of Rangpur. Attempt was made by the abbot of Dihing Satra with his disciples to repulse them but went to vain. The Ahom priests too collected bands of soldiers and fought with the rebels.

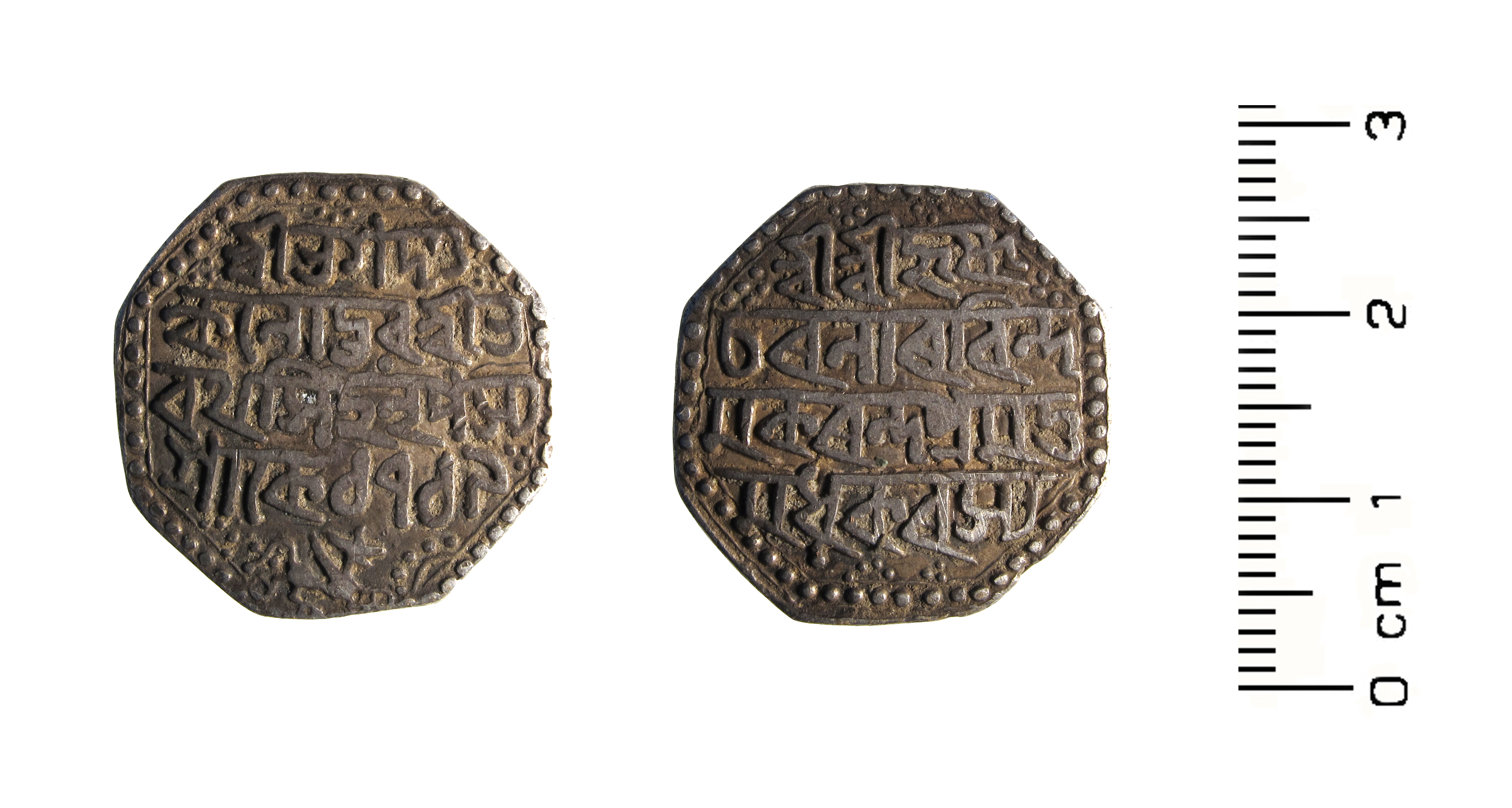
Silver rupee of rebel king Bharath Singha, struck in Rangpur.

The rebels after many prolonged battles, marching along the Jhanji River appeared at the capital gates and surrounded Rangpur in January 1788. At this sight king Suhutpanphaa accompanied by most of his officers left for Guwahati, leaving Purnananda Burhagohain in charge. The Burhagohain too deserted Rangpur after resisting the rebels for a few days. From Guwahati, Suhitpangphaa sent a large contingent of troops under the Pani Phukan to the assistance of Burhagohain. Receiving reinforcement, the royalist assumed offensive but still couldn't manage to reoccupy the Ahom metropolis. In August 1788, Patkonwar (a son of Rajeswar Singha) raised a huge army with the assistance of Nara Raja and recovered Rangpur from the Moamorias, but his victory was short lived and he was eventually killed following an internal dissension in his camp.

The Burhagohain erected a line of ramparts from Bar Ali to Kharikatiya Ali along the Namdang river, from where he resisted further rebel incursion. The royalist finally unable to stand the rebels fell back to Gaurisagar. The rebels then laid siege to the Gaurisagar Fort, and a large number of people along with many high officials fell fighting. The Burhagohain had to ultimately retreat to Taratali thence Dichoi. From Dichoi further incursion of rebels were resisted. The rebels frequently harassed the people, living under the tract controlled by Burhagohain. The Upper Assam razed by continuous battles and disorder, cultivation suffered, there occurred a very terrible famine–the severest in Assam's history.

The rebels gradually extended their control up to Dergaon, they couldn't capture the strongholds of royalist at Dichoi fort. The rebels extended their control over large tracts of areas, but no attempt was made to establish a centralised administration by the rebel leaders. The captured region was locally administered with Harihar Tanti in the north bank of the Brahmaputra, Howha ruling Majuli, Sarbananada Singha ruling the Moran tracts from Bengmara (present-day Tinsukia). Bharat was made the king. Coins were struck regularly in Bharat's and Sarbananda's names. Territory up to Ladoigarh was kept immune from the rebels. Purnananda Burhagohain erected a series of earthen rampart known to the rebels as Bibudhi garh, from here the royalist conducted the war-operations. The continuous set-back left the royalist camp demoralised.

The rebellion of Moamorias inspired people from different parts of the country to rise up against Ahom government as result of it brought breakdown of khel-system and it became effectively hard to recruit soldiers.

The discontentment among the inhabitants of Darrang as a result of entry of refugees from Eastern Assam and their plundering activities caused them to protest. This was supported by the inhabitants of Kamrup who had been subjected to humiliation.

Suhitpangphaa from Guwahati sailed down to Nagaon due to the underlying rebellious activities of Darrangi prince Krishnananrayan. Here the exploitation of the local inhabitants by the royal officers caused dissension among the Nagayans and they surrounded King's camp protesting. They demanded the dismissal of those officers whom they held for their oppression. Soon after, one Bairagi besieged on King's camp, forcing Suhitpangphaa to flee.

Suhitpangphaa appealed for foreign help, envoys were sent to neighboring countries seeking military assistance. Apart from the king of Manipur, all pleaded on their inability to send troops. Similarly, British help could be acquired and a contingent of British troops under the leadership of Captain Welsh was despatched to Assam. After the expulsion of Barkandazes from Guwahati, they directed their operation towards the Moamoria rebels. Captain Welsh captured Rangpur in March 1794. After this, further operation against the rebels was pleaded but was discarded by the Governor General and the contingent of British troops was recalled. Suhitpangphaa couldn't hold on Rangpur and soon was recaptured by the rebels. The affairs in Guwahati too degraded, and the Barkandazes renewed their depredations. Gaurinath retreated to Dichoi, to the strongholds of Purnananda Burhagohain, where he died soon. Following the death of Gaurinath, the Burhagohain became the de facto ruler of the Ahom state. He placed his own nominee to the Ahom throne, Kinaram later Suklingphaa.

This experience and the military display by Captain Welsh and his troops encouraged the Ahoms to create a standing army of mostly paid Hindustani sepoys to replace the paik based militia. One chief rebel leader, Phopai was killed in 1796 and the rebel king of Rangpur, Bhrarath in 1799. Sadiya fell to the royalists in 1800 from the grip of Khamtis. The Moamoria fugitives living as refuge in the neighbouring Dimasa and Jaintia Kingdoms, regrouped themselves and began harassing the royalist villagers of Nagaon. Five companies of royalist sepoys were dispatched, but they were somehow lured to the jungles and slaughtered. Following this year, the Ahom force defeated the combined force of Moamoria rebels and Dimasa king Krishnachandra. In 1803, a plot of revolt by the people belonging to a secret sect of the night–worshippers (Ratikhowa) was detected and the leading conspirators were put to death in time.

Purnanada Burhagohain dispatched five companies under the Deka Phukan in 1805 to retake the Bengmara region, then under the control of Sarbananda. The first skirmish took place at on the banks of the Dibru river at Bhutiating. The royalist forces were able to defeat Sarbananda's forces which then took shelter at Holongaguri, and a section of the forces submitted eventually to the Ahom king who were settled at Ghilamara. Nevertheless, both Purnananda and Sarbananda understood that this was a stalemate—and Sarbananda agreed to a peace proposal. Sarbananda was given the title of Barsenapati and given autonomous command of the Bengmara region which came to be called the Matak rajya; and both Sarbananda and his son Matibar who followed him as Barsenapati continued to pay annual tributes to the Ahom kingdom.

The Moamaria rebellion thus ended with the creation of a near-independent Matak tract ruled by a Barsenapati and the near-end of the Paik system.

== Aftermath ==
The massive agitation of rebels shook the foundations of Ahom state. Though the Moamaria rebellion ended in failure, it brought the breakdown of exploitive paik and Khel systems, on which the economic state of Ahoms was based. This compelled the state to move on money-economy. The rebellion ended indecisively with both the sides completely ruined, the country was fanatically depopulated. The population came down to one-half of what it was before, and economic life was totally disrupted. Swarnalata Baruah (1985) states: “The Moamariya rebellion was a rebellion of the people against the existing government and those who disfavoured a change in it joined with the hands with the royalist."

The discontented elements remained silent for very long, for they considered the Ahom monarchy to be unchallengeable. But this was all shattered throwing the divine origin of kingship and by putting a line of common men on the throne. "No alternative to the feudal system emerged, since no new ruling class could germinate from the peasantry which was relatively undifferentiated, or from its undeveloped stratum of traders and artisans. The issues became blurred since the rebels comprised diverse and nebulous class elements with varying degrees of dislike for the regime. Nevertheless, the ruling class could no more rule in the old manner."

== Bibliography ==
- Hazarika, Dhurba Jyoti (2005). The roots of the popular discontent in Assam under the ahom rules. Gauhati University.
- Barpujari, HK (1992). Barpujari, H K (ed.). The Comprehensive History of Assam. Vol. 2. Guwahati: Publication Board Assam.
- Gogoi, Jahnabi (2002), Agrarian system of medieval Assam, Concept Publishing Company, New Delhi
- Baruah, S L (1985), A Comprehensive History of Assam, Munshiram Manoharlal
- Baruah, S. L. (1993), Last Days of Ahom Monarchy, New Delhi
- Dutta, Sristidhar (1985), The Mataks and Their Kingdom: Castes and Tribes of Assam, Chugh Publications, archived from the original on 2023-07-01
- Dutta, Sristidhar (1990). "The Moamaria Rebellion of Assam and the Participation of Hill Tribes and their Bahatias". Proceedings of the Indian History Congress. 51: 393–398.
- Guha, Amalendu (1984). "Neo-Vaishnavism to Insurgency: Peasant Uprisings and Crisis of Feudalism in Late 18th Century Assam". CSSSC Occasional Paper;67.
- Guha, Amalendu (1991), Medieval and Early Colonial Assam, Calcutta: K P Bagchi
- Sharma, Chandan Kumar (1996). "Socio-Economic Structure and Peasant Revolt : The Case of Moamoria Upsurge in the Eighteenth Century Assam". Indian Anthropologist. 26 (2): 33–52. JSTOR 41919803.
