= Tinsukia =

- City
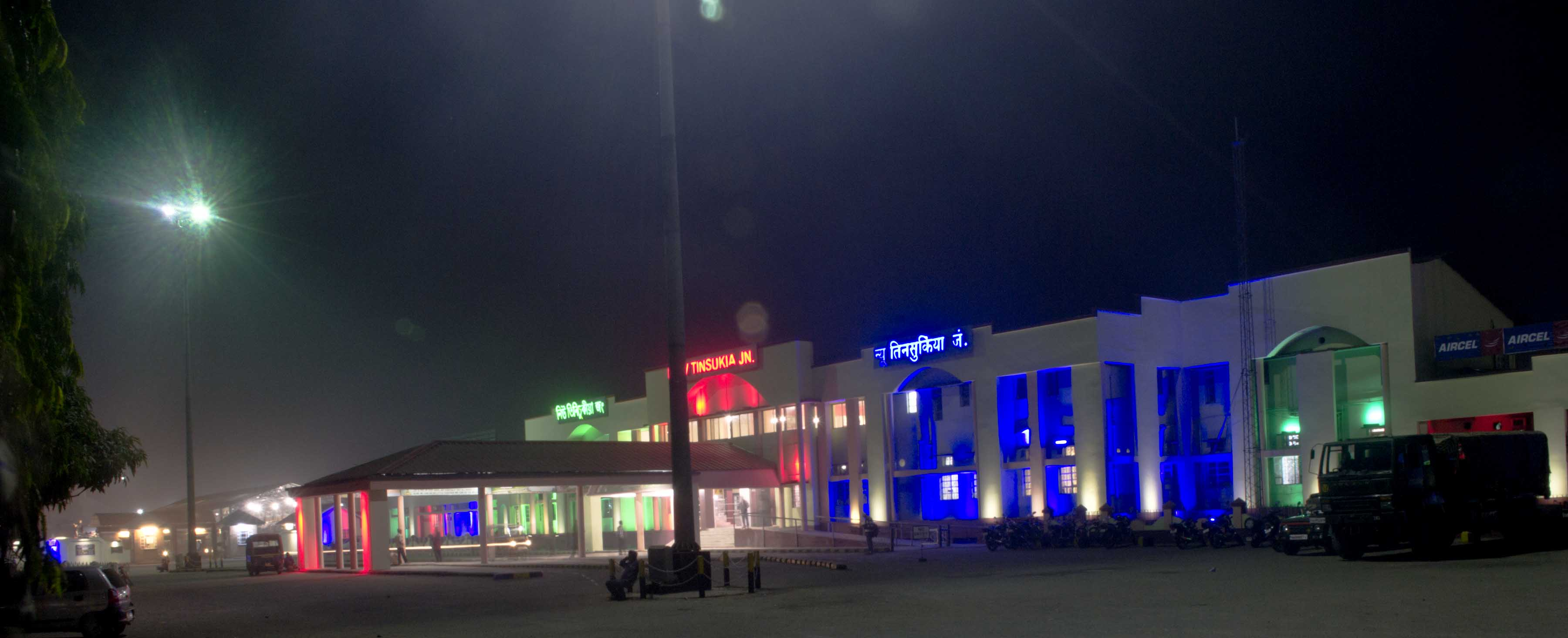
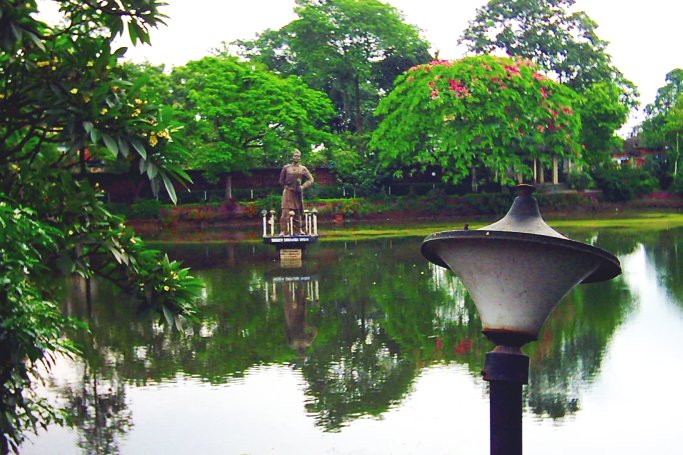
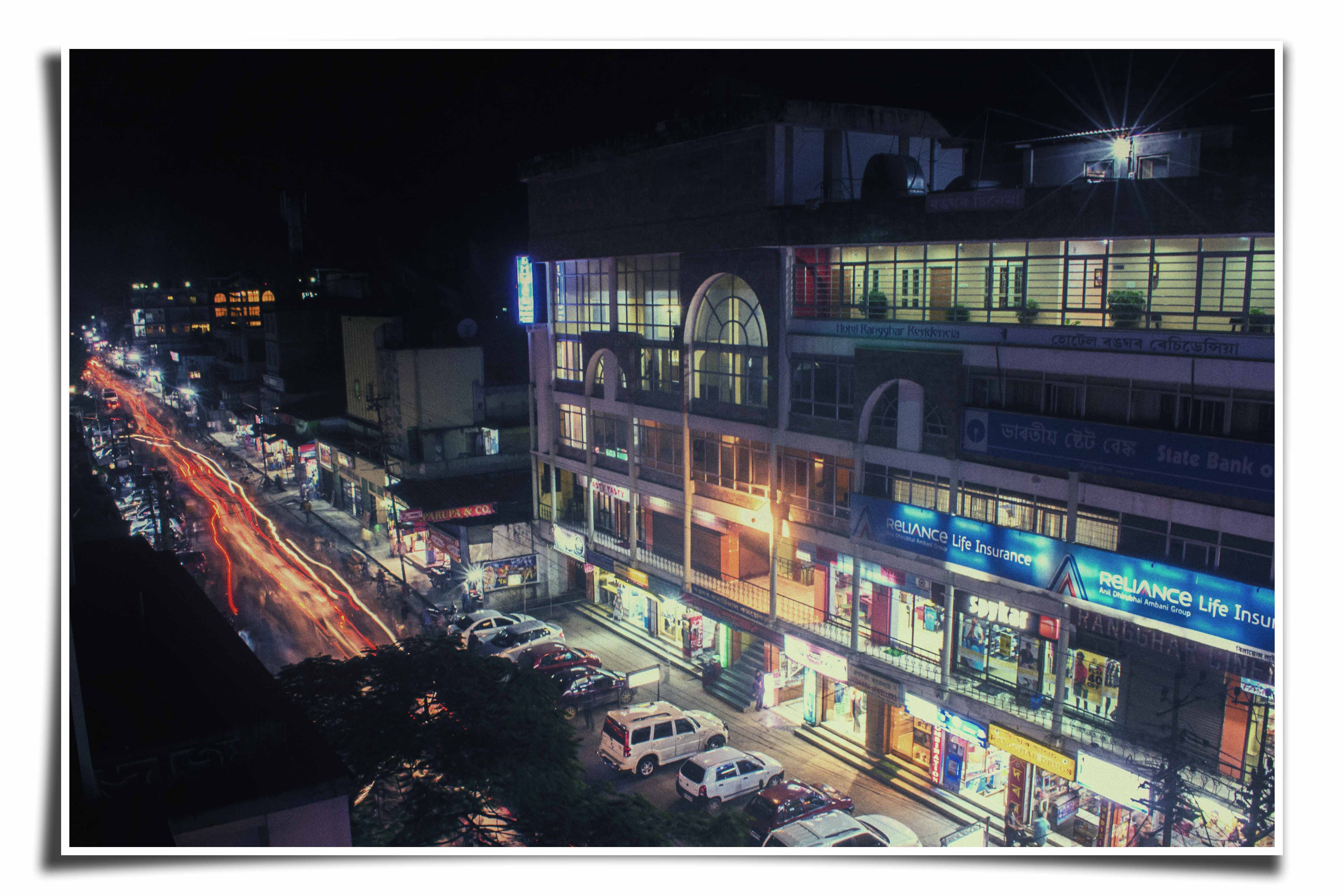
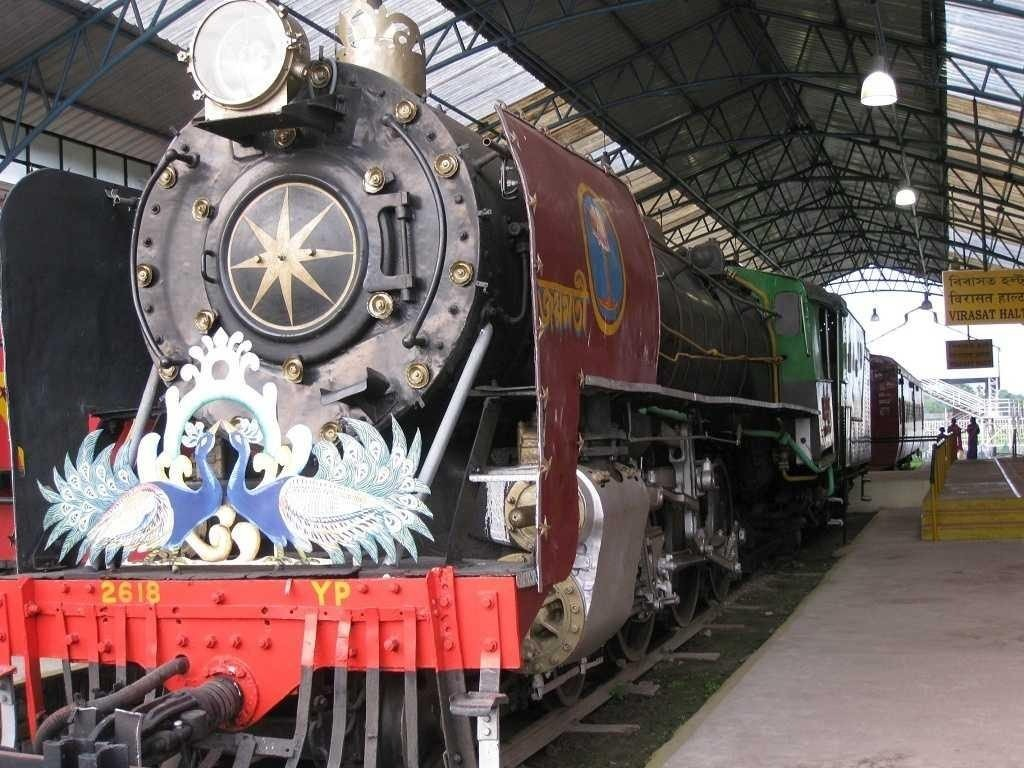
- From top, then left to right: New Tinsukia Junction railway station, Tinkunia pukhri, Night View of GNB Road and Ranghr Complex, Jaymoti Steam Engine at Railway Heritage Museum
- Nickname: Commercial Hub of Assam
- Location in Assam, India Tinsukia (India)
- Coordinates: 27°29′17.721″N 95°21′19.872″E
- Country: India
- State: Assam
- Region: Upper Assam
- District: Tinsukia
- No. Of Wards: 20
- Established: 1889

Government
  - Type: Municipality
  - Body: Tinsukia Municipal Board
  - Chairman: Udhav Agarwal, BJP
  - District Commissioner: Sri Swapneel Paul, IAS
  - Superintendent Of Police: Sri Mayank Kumar, IPS

Area
  - Total: 30 km^{2} (12 sq mi)
  - Rank: 7th in Assam
- Elevation: 116 m (381 ft)

Population (2011)
  - Total: 126,389
  - Rank: 7th in Assam
  - Density: 4,200/km^{2} (11,000/sq mi)
- Demonym: Tinsukian
- Time zone: UTC+5:30 (IST)
- PIN: 7861XX
- Telephone code: 91-374
- ISO 3166 code: IN-AS
- Vehicle registration: AS-23
- Sex Ratio: 910 ♀️/ 1000 ♂️
- Climate: Cwa
- Official Language: Assamese
- Literacy Rate: ▲89.03% high
- Lok Sabha Constituency: Dibrugarh
- Vidhan Sabha Constituency: Tinsukia, Digboi, Doom Dooma, Sadiya, Margherita, Makum
- Website: tinsukia.assam.gov.in

Tinsukia (Pron: ˌtɪnˈsʊkiə) is an industrial city in Assam, India. It is situated 480 kilometres (298 mi) north-east of Guwahati and 84 kilometres (52 mi) away from the border with Arunachal Pradesh. It is the administrative headquarters of Tinsukia District of Assam, India.

Tinsukia serves as the headquarters of the Moran Autonomous Council, which is the governing council of the Morans (an indigenous tribal group found predominantly in the Tinsukia district and neighbouring Arunachal Pradesh).

== History ==
Tinsukia is the site of Bengmara, which was originally known as Changmai Pathar. It was the capital of the Matak kingdom which was founded by Swargadeo Sarbananda Singha.

Coin issued by Sarbananda Singha

Swargadeo Sarbananda Singha, known as Mezara, was a member of the erstwhile Chutia royal family. Mezara adopted the name Sarbananda Singha after he became the king. Swargadeo Sarbananda Singha introduced coins in his name and in Saka 1716 and 1717, he inscribed the title Swargadeo in the coins.

== Geography ==
Tinsukia is located at 27.5°N 95.37°E. It has an average elevation of 116 metres (380 feet).

== Demographics ==
Religions in Tinsukia (2011)
Religion	Percent
Hinduism	88.65%
Islam	9.61%
Sikhism	0.48%
Jainism	0.44%
Christianity	0.41%
Other or not stated	0.41%

Languages spoken in Tinsukia (2011)
1. Hindi (34.5%)
2. Bengali (33.0%)
3. Assamese (21.3%)
4. Bhojpuri (4.37%)
5. Nepali (1.89%)
6. Rajasthani (0.96%)
7. Others (3.98%)

According to the 2011 census, Tinsukia had a population of 116,322. It is estimated that the city has a population of 178,000 people in 2024. Males constituted 55% of the population and females 45%. Tinsukia had an average literacy rate of 70.15%, higher than the national average of 64.84%; male literacy was 77.89%, and female literacy 63.54%. 13.29% of the population was under 6 years of age.

According to the 2011 census, 34.46% of the population spoke Hindi, 33.05% Bengali, 21.29% Assamese, 4.37% Bhojpuri, 1.89% Nepali and 0.96% Rajasthani as their first language.

== Politics ==
Tinsukia is part of Dibrugarh (Lok Sabha constituency). Sanjoy Kishan of BJP is the current MLA of Tinsukia (Vidhan Sabha constituency).

== Media ==
The Assamese daily Dainik Janambhumi is published from Tinsukia along with Guwahati and Jorhat.

== Notable people from Tinsukia ==
- Bhupen Hazarika
- Jagadish Bhuyan
- Mahika Sharma
- Savitri Jindal
- Dulal Manki
- Bolin Chetia
- Harekrishna Deka
- Sarbananda Singha, Matak king
