= Matak rajya =

Administrative area

Matak Rajya
- 1805–1839
- Capital: Bengmara (present-day Tinisukia)
- Area
- 4,661 km^{2} (1,800 sq mi)
- Government
- Barsenapati
  - 1791–1805: Mejera
  - 1805–1839: Matibar
  - 1839–1839: Maju Gohain
- History
  - Foundation of the Matak Kingdom: 1805
  - Annexed to British India: 12 November 1839
- Today part of: India

Matak rajya or Matak kingdom was a 19th-century autonomous region within the Ahom kingdom in Assam. It was governed by the Barsenapati ("Great General").

== History ==
This autonomous region was established by an agreement in 1805 between the Purnanada Burhagohain and Sarbananda Singha, the leader of the Moamorias in Bengmara (present-day Tinsukia town), where it was agreed that the Ahom kingdom would recognise the region as Matak rajya ("Matak kingdom") under the leadership of the Barsenapati ("Great General") and Sarbananda Singha would pay an annual tribute. The agreement was the result of the Moamoria rebellion and the dangers the weakened Ahom kingdom was facing from different directions—and the establishment of the autonomous region resulted in the end of the rebellion and Moamoria antagonisms against the Ahom state. Sarbananda was followed by his son, Matibar, as the Barsenapati who in turn remained loyal to the Ahom kingdom.

In 1826, when the Ahom kingdom fell to the Burmese Konbaung dynasty, the Matak rajya was the only one to maintain its independence.

Later, it came under the protection of the British rule and finally the British took complete control in 1839.

== Government ==
The Barsenapati was the nominal head of this region, with the actual power resting with the council of village headmen ("Council of Elders"). The people paid no tax, but paid personal service—a prime cause of immigration from the region under Purandar Singha.
