= Dulal Manki =

Indian folk musician

- দুলাল মানকি
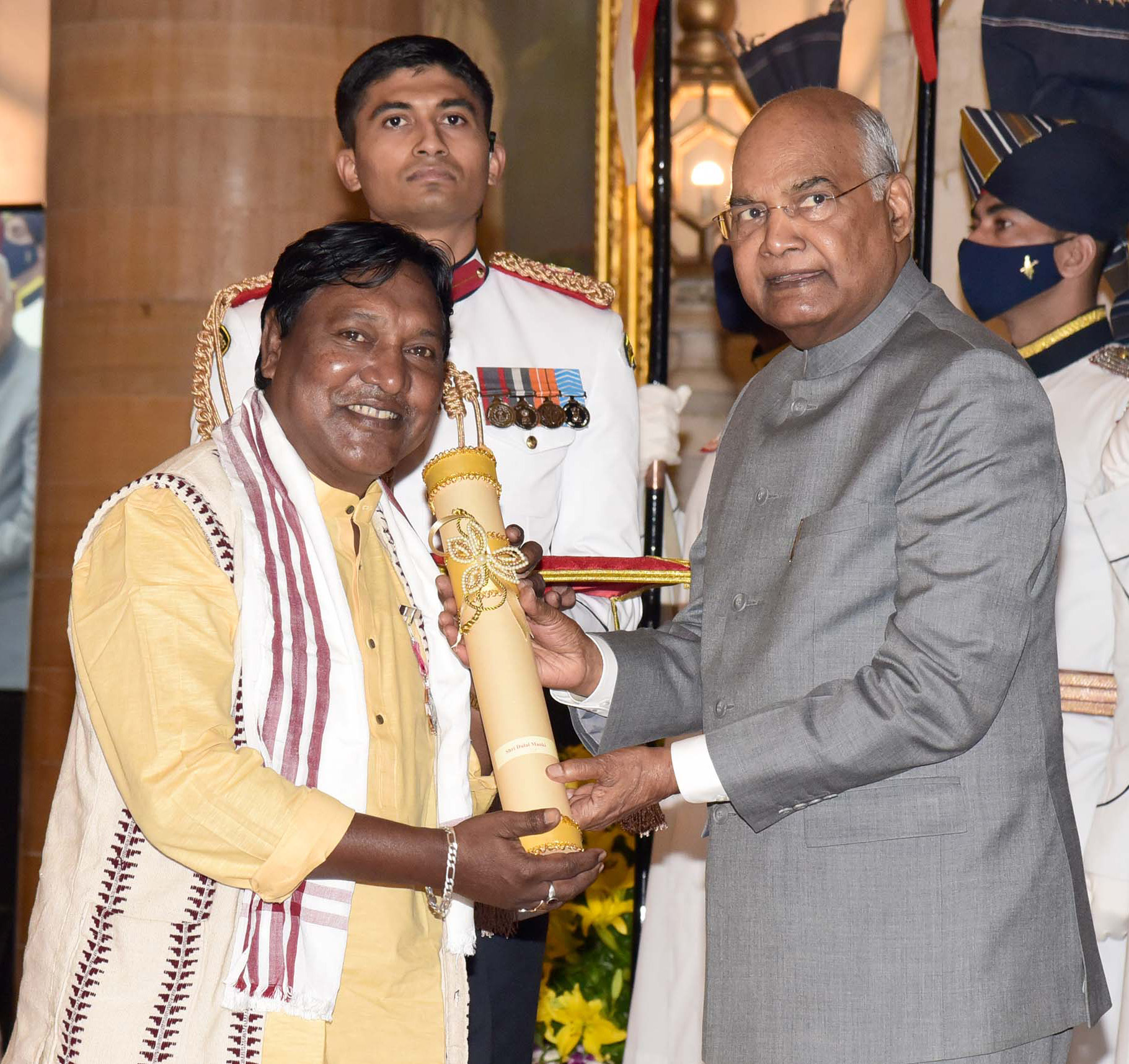
- Dulal Manki receiving Padma Shri award from President Kovind.
- Born: 1964 (age 61–62); Dhayedam Tea Garden; Tinsukia district, Assam
- Education: DoomDooma College (Drop out)
- Occupation: Singer
- Known for: Jhumar, folk music
- Title: Jhumair Samrāṭ
- Father: Mathur Chandra Manki
- Honours: Padma Shri

Dulal Manki is an Indian Assamese folk artist and musician. He is one of the traditional folk music artists from Tea-garden community of Assam. In 2021, the Government of India awarded him the Padma Shri for his contribution on music.

== Early life and education ==
Manki was born in 1964 in Dhayedam Tea Garden of Tinsukia district, Assam. His father was Mathur Chandra Manki. Dulal Manki received his early education at Dhayedam Tea Garden Primary School. After that he studied at Barhapjan High School. After completing his high school education, he was enrolled in Dumduma College, a part of Dibrugarh University. During the Assam movement in the eighties, he was half-educated due to the turbulent situation.

== Music life ==
Manki was born into a musical family. His father was a folk musician and was familiar with the traditional songs of the Chah community. He received his early musical education from his father. He performed the popular song Jhumur - Ki Toke Bandhi Delai from MTV Coke Studio Season 3, which was released in 2013, along with Angaraag Mahanta (Papon) and Seemant Shekhar.

== Awards ==
- Guru Of Jhumur by EZCC Kolkata
- Prag Cine Award 2009–10
- Padma Shri in 2021
