= Paiks =

Labour system of medieval Assam

The Paiks or Paik people worked in various system on which the economy of the Ahom kingdom and Mallabhum kingdom of medieval Assam and Bengal depended. In Paik system, adult and able males, called paiks were obligated to render service to the state and form its militia in return for a piece of land for cultivation owned by the kingdom But it was not the Ahom kingdom alone that used a corvee system like this in Northeast India—Kingdom of Manipur and in a simpler form Jaintia kingdom and the Kachari kingdom too used similar systems that had tribal origins. The mature structure was designed by Momai Tamuli Borbarua in 1608, and extensively and exhaustively implemented by 1658 during the reign of Sutamla Jayadhwaj Singha. The system continued to evolve over time to meet the needs of the Ahom state and in time began to accumulate contradictions. By the end of the Moamoria rebellion (1769–1805) the Paik system had collapsed.

== History ==
=== Paik system ===
Every male in the Ahom kingdom between the ages of fifteen and fifty who was not a noble, a priest, a high caste or a slave was a paik. The paiks were organized into four-member groups called gots.

The Koch kings also followed a similar system in Koch Bihar and Koch Hajo, following the Ahoms.

==== Land holdings ====
The duty of a paik was to render service to the Ahom state in exchange for which he was granted 2 puras (2.66 acres) of usufruct cultivable land (gaa mati), which was neither hereditary nor transferable.

==== Royal service ====
The royal services that the paiks tended to were defense (the Ahom kingdom did not have a standing army till the beginning of 19th century and its army consisted of the militia formed of paiks), civil construction (embankments, roads, bridges, tanks, etc.), military production (boats, arrows, muskets), etc. There were two major classes of paiks: kanri paik (archer) who rendered his service as a soldier or as a laborer and chamua paik who rendered non-manual service and had a higher social standing. Some other minor classes were: bilatiyas (tenants at the estates of nobles), dewaliyas (attached to temples and sattras) and bahatiyas (attached to hill masters). Kanri paiks could move up to chamua. Most of the lower paik officers—Bora, Saikia, Hazarika, Tamuli, Pachani—belonged to the chamua class.

=== Bengal ===
In the jungle estates, zamindars employed members of the Chuar community as village police, known as paiks. The leaders of the paiks were referred to as sardars. Instead of paying them a regular salary, the zamindars provided these paiks with rent-free chakran lands (also called paikan lands) as compensation. The paiks viewed this land allocation as their "ancient right." Rather than cultivating these lands themselves, the paiks typically hired landless Chuars to work the land. As a result, the hired Chuars became tenants of the paiks. These tenants were distinct from the non-tribal peasants living in the nearby villages. Although the Chuars worked the paikan lands, there was no strong sense of unity between them and the non-Chuar peasants.
