= Angavastra =

Shoulder cloth

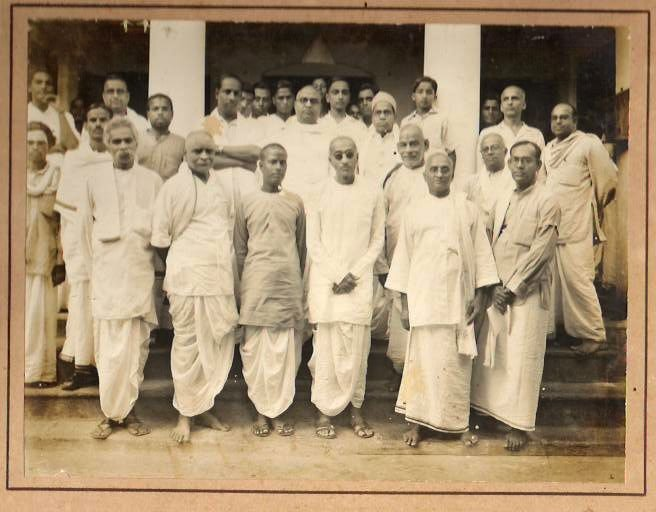
Tamil Brahmins (Iyers and Iyengars) in traditional mantras veshti and angavastram at a convention of the Mylai Tamil Sangam, c. 1930s

An angavastra (plural, angavastram, Sanskrit: अङ्गवस्त्रम्) is a shoulder cloth or stole worn by men in India, especially in Maharashtra and South India. It is a single, rectangular piece of fabric and may have decorated borders. An angavastra may be worn with a dhoti and kurta. An angavastra may be offered as a mark of respect to guests, elders and gurus.

== Style and use ==
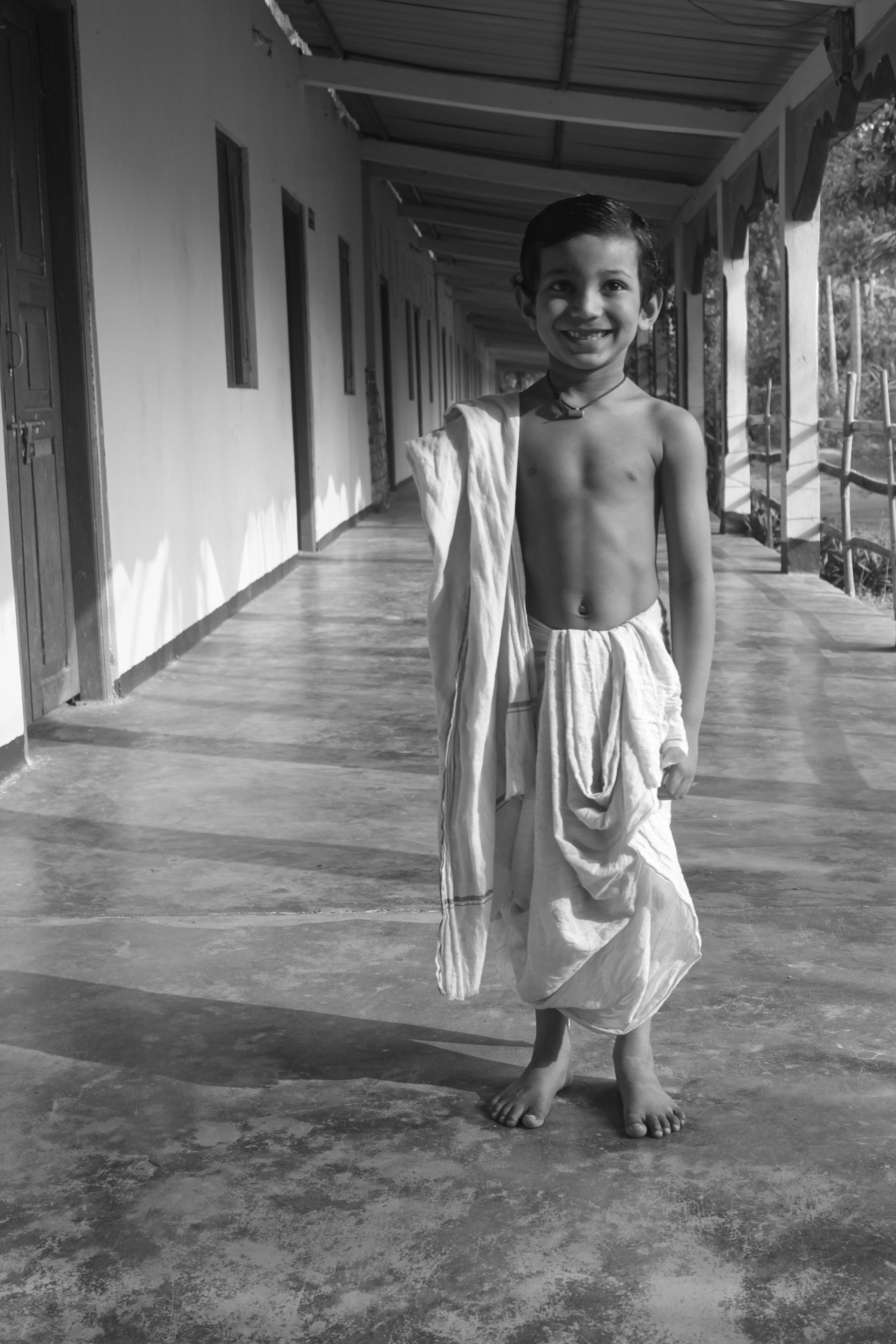
Young monk in the Auniati Satra, dressed in a white cotton dothi and angavastra

Angavastra is a simple loose garment, usually paired or matching with dhoti color, draped over the shoulders. It is a traditional wear of South India.

Prime Minister Narendra Modi wore karai veshti dhoti, kurta, and angavastram, the traditional attire during his visit to Arjuna's Penance, Krishna's Butterball, the Pancha Rathas, and Shore Temple. A weaver from Varanasi designed and wove a special silk angavastram incorporating Buddhist mantras for Narendra Modi.
