= Dakhinpat Satra =

Dakshinpat Satra
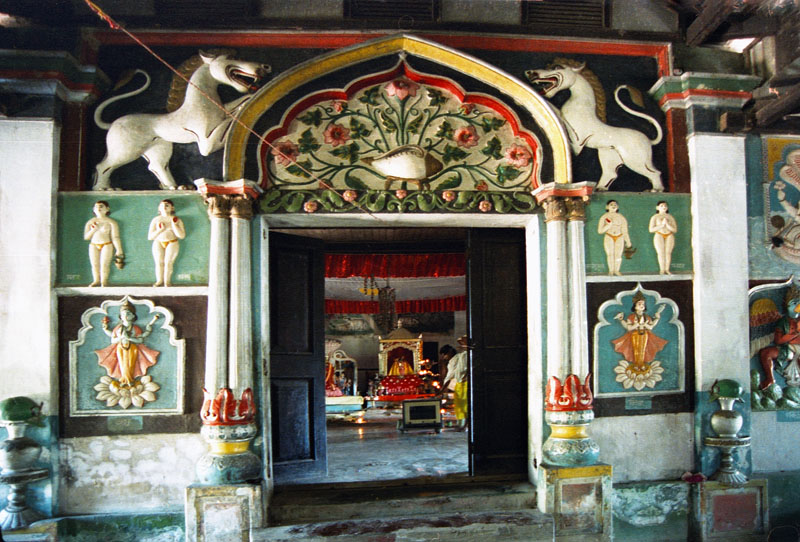

Religion
- Affiliation: Hinduism
- District: Majuli
- Deity: Jadhav Rai
- Festival: Raasleela

Location
- State: Assam
- Country: India
- Interactive map of Dakshinpat Satra

Architecture
- Type: Assamese
- Creator: Banamalidev
- Completed: 1654
- Inscriptions: Assamese; Brajavali

Dakhinpat Satra, situated in the south-east corner of Majuli, is one of Assam's best known and principle monastic Satra, established by Banamali Dev Goswami in 1654 under the patronization of Ahom King Jayadhwaj Singha. This Satra particularly belongs to Brahmasamhati sect, founded by Damodardev.

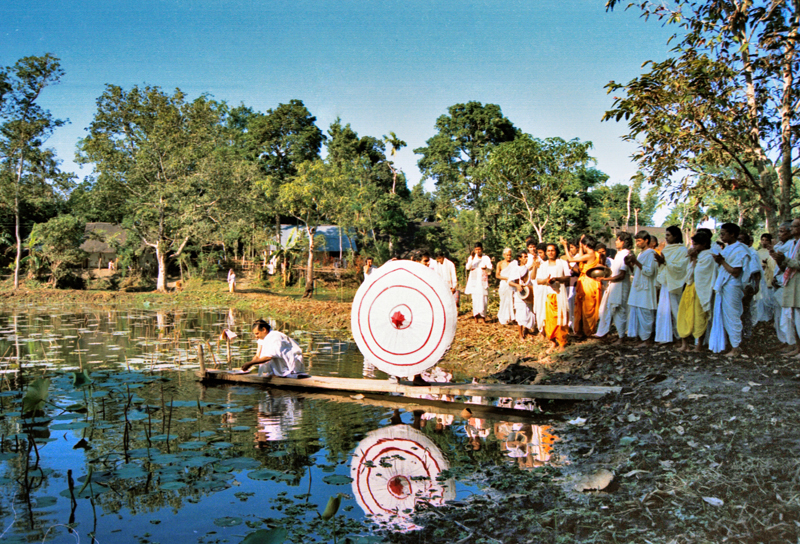
Ceremony performed by the Satra monks.

== Satra ==
Banamali Devgoswami, a prominent disciple of Vamshigopal, established the Satra under the patronization of Ahom King Jayadhwaj Singha, who endowed extensive land grants and provisions for the smooth functioning of this Satra. The prestige and affluence of the Satra were further enhanced by Chakradhwaj Singha, Udayaditya Singha and Sulikpha who are considered to be the disciples of Banamalidev.

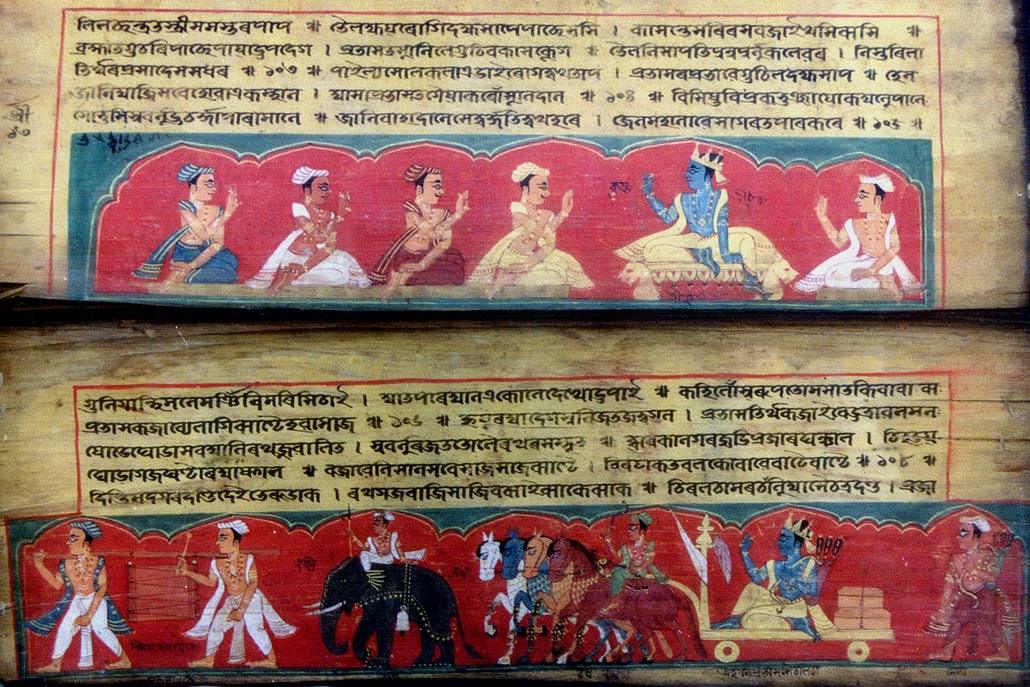
Illustrated manuscript of Dakhinpat Satra.

The main idol worshipped here is of Lord Jadav Rai. Dakhinpat Satra played a very important role in political and administrative affairs during the Ahom reign. It is also one of the Chari-Raj Satra, other viz., Auniati, Garmur, and Kuruabahi. The Satra belongs to the Brahmasamhati sect, founded by Damodardev.

The monks of the Satra are called Bhakats and lead a life of celibacy. The head of the Satra is called Sattradhikar, next to him is the Deka-Adhikar or the successor to the Satradhikar. All pontiffs of the Dakhinpat Satra belong to the lineage of Banamalidev (1576-1683). Therefore one brother of the Satradhikar is allowed to marry and continue their lineage.

=== Culture ===
Dakhinpat Satra is well known for its annual Rass festival and Brahmaputra Puja, held after every twelve years. Performance of many other Sankari culture is performed regularly within the Satra premise. The Satra has a collection of hundreds of manuscripts, many being illustrated with paintings. It also possesses a large number of valuable artifacts from the Ahom reign.

== List of Satradhikars ==
1. Banamali Devgoswami
2. Ram Devgoswami
3. Krishna Devgoswami
4. Aatma Devgoswami
5. Kam Devgoswami
6. Saha Devgoswami
7. Ronti Devgoswami
8. Bishnu Devgoswami
9. Bibhu Devgoswami
10. Bashu Devgoswami
11. Shuva Devgoswami
12. Nara Devgoswami
13. Narayan Devgoswami
14. Hari Devgoswami
15. Ramananda Devgoswami
16. Nanigopal Devgoswami (present–)
