= Sarbananda Singha =

Moamoria leader in 19th century

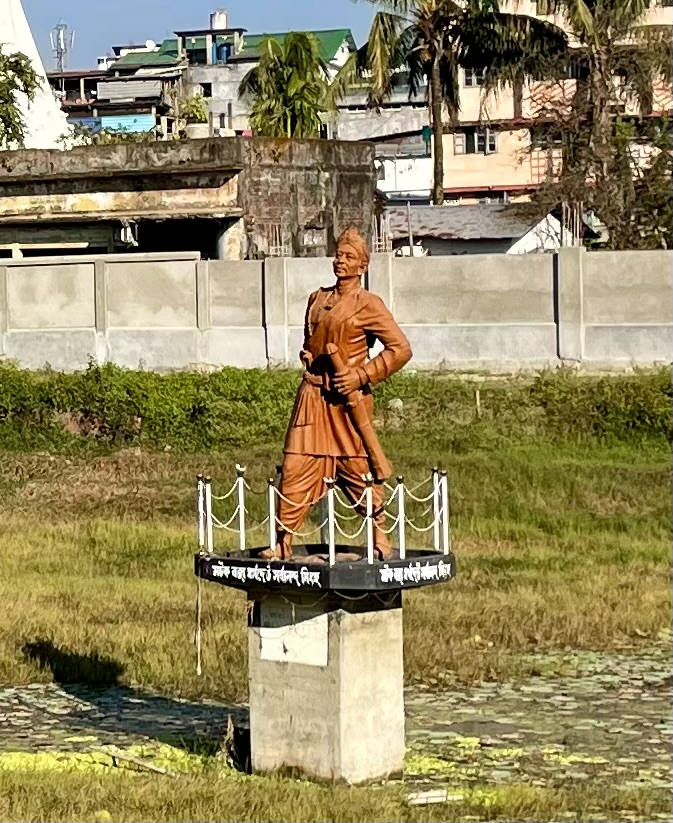
Statue of Matak King Sarbananda Singha in the middle of Tinkunia Pukhuri, Tinsukia.

Sarbananda Singha or Mejera was a Moamoria leader. He was Buruk Chutia by ethnicity. He was the first ruler of the autonomous region called Matak rajya (1805–1839), selected by his followers, with its capital in Bengmara, in what is now Tinsukia district in the Indian state of Assam. He was the son of Merutnandan. He was succeeded by his eldest son Matibor Borsenapoti as the second ruler of the Matak Kingdom.

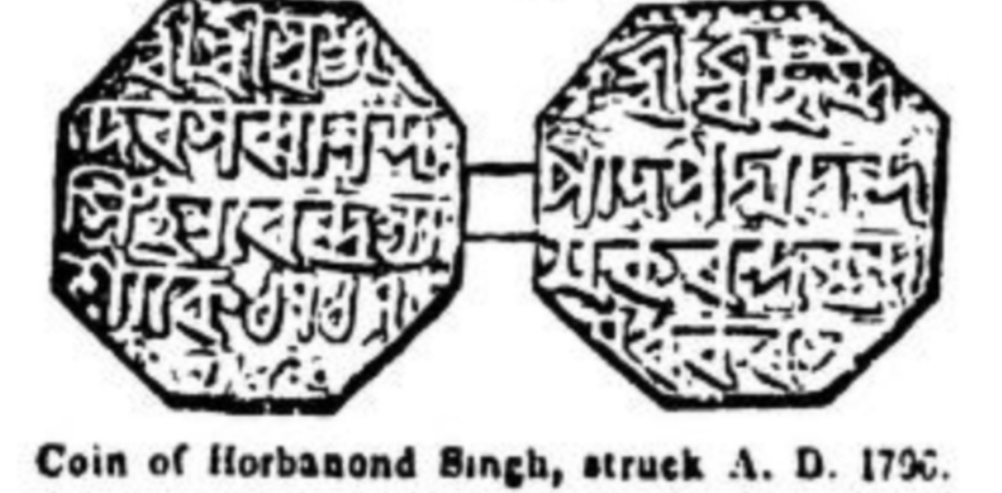
Coins of Sarbananda Singha

He was assisted by a group of Singhpos against the Ahom government. Sarbananda Singha later has to retreat to a Singpho village when Purnananda Burhagohain after recovering Rangpur sent an expedition against him, for which he Sarbananda Singha sent envoys to Burmese court for assistance.
