= Sujinpha =

Ahom king from 1675 to 1677

Sujinphaa
- Chaopha Swargadeo of Ahom Kingdom

Ahom King
- Reign: 1675 – 1677
- Predecessor: Gobar Roja
- Successor: Sudaipha
- Born: Arjun Konwar; 1635; Ahom kingdom
- Died: July 1677 (aged 41–42); Ahom kingdom
- Consort: Two daughters of Kekora Sandikai
- Issue: Sengmung Kalia Gohain; Dighala Gohain; Sutyang Dhala Gohain; Sunnang Saru Gohain
Names
- Dihingia Rojaa II Sur Singha
- House: Namrupia
- Dynasty: Ahom dynasty
- Father: Namrupia Raja Tailai
- Mother: Daughter of Khatowal Cheita family
- Religion: Ahom religion Hinduism

Sujinpha (born Arjun Konwar; 1635 – July 1677) was Ahom King from 1675 until his deposition in 1677.

Atan Burhagohain installed him on the throne after removing Debera Borbarua from power and deposing the previous king, Gobar Roja. Sujinpha began his reign well with proper advice and support from Atan Burhagohain and other nobles. But soon, acting on the advice of his wife and other advisors, the king began to defy the authority of the Burhagohain, which resulted in a head-on collision between both sides.

The king successfully defended the first onslaught of Atan Burhagohain's forces, but fell to the second, which was reinforced with troops from Guwahati. Sujinpha was deposed and blinded. Some sources state that he killed himself, while some sources maintain that he was murdered by Bhatdhara Phukan, the brother of Laluksola Borphukan.

== Ancestry and early life ==
Sujinpha was the son of Namrupia Raja Tailai and grandson of Ahom king Pratap Singha. His early name was Arjun Konwar, and he belonged to the Namrupia branch of the Royal Ahom Dynasty. His mother was a daughter of the Khatowal Chetia family of Chutia lineage. (Note: The Khatowal Chetia clan was formed by the descendants of a Chutia family incorporated into the Ahom fold during Sukaphaa's reign) Sujinpha married two daughters of Kekora Sandikai; the elder was made the Barkuanri and the younger was made the Parvatia kuanri. The Sandikai family was one of the prominent Ahom noble families. The Barkuanri bore him four sons, Sengmung, Dighala, Sutyang and Sunnang. They were also known as Kalia Gohain, Dighala Gohain, Dhala Gohain and Saru Gohain. He, along with his family lived in Dihing, maintaining their family estate.

== Accession to the throne ==
After the deposition and execution of Udayaditya Singha in 1672, the Ahom kingdom entered into a period of weak kings, with de facto power wielded, successively, by three prominent ministers: Debera Barbarua, Atan Burhgohain and Laluk Sola Borphukan. Debera Borbarua, the first such minister, rose in prominence and exerted complete authority over the administration in Garhgaon, the Ahom capital, at a time when many powerful ministers were at guard at newly occupied Guwahati soon after the Battle of Saraighat (thus these officers were called Saraighatias). Debera's period of control saw three kings being deposed and put to death, within a short period of about three years. After Udayaditya Singha, he installed and subsequently deposed two others: Ramdhwaj Singha and Suhung. He then installed Gobar from Tungkhungia branch of Royal Ahom Dynasty on the throne. Meanwhile, the Saraighatias in Guwahati decided to put an end of Debera's atrocities and therefore led by Prime Minister Atan Burhagohain, they marched towards the capital Garhgaon. Gobar and Debera Borbarua were captured and put to death. The nobles offered the crown to Atan Burhagohain and declared their intention to make him king, but Burhagohain gently declined the offer stating that only members of Royal Ahom Dynasty, the direct descendants of Sukapha were alone eligible to become kings. The Burhagohain searched for a suitable candidate for the throne, and they found Arjun Konwar, living at Dihing, suitable for the post. Therefore, Atan Burhagohain nominated Arjun Konwar as the king of the Ahom kingdom. In November 1675 CE, the coronation ceremony took place at Barnaosal at a newly constructed Singarighar, without which function no prince attained the status of a full-fledged sovereign. He assumed the Ahom name Sujinpha, while the Brahmins conferred on him the title Sur Singha. Owing to his origin from Dihing, he was also known as Dihingia Raja. Sujinpha ascended the throne with great éclat. Large sum of money were distributed amongst the people and the festivities continued for seven days.

== Reign ==
=== Appointment of new officials ===
Sujinpha and Atan Burhagohain immediately set upon them to reorganized the administration at the capital Garhgaon, which got destabilized during the period of Debera Borbarua's ministerial dictatorship. New officers were appointed replacing the ones appointed by Debera. They were Kenduguria Sheng-Klang (Borpatrogohain); Guimela Borgohain's son Laluk (Borgohain); son of Rangasila, Lanching-Shaikan (Borbarua). The sons and nephews of the Phukans and Baruas who had been killed by Debera were admitted to the rank of Phukans and Baruas.

=== Conflicts with the premier ===
The reign of Sujinpha, supported by the wisdom and foresight of Atan Burhagohain, promised to be one of prosperity and peace. But some of the officers and nobles disliked this combination; more specially abhorred the growing power of Atan Burhagohain. So, a certain section of nobles tried to create discord between the king and the premier. A maternal relative of the king, Lao Deka, also known as Harkina Barua, belonged to the Dihingia Khatowal Chetia family. He was appointed Barchetia and, as a close relative of the king's mother, had free access to the royal palace. According to S. K. Bhuyan, he encouraged the chief queen's fears that the growing authority of Atan Burhagohain threatened the succession of her four sons. The resulting mistrust contributed to the estrangement between Sujinpha and the Burhagohain. The four princes supported their mother, and gave vent to similar misgivings, adding, "Our sovereignty is only in name as the Burhagohain monopolises all power in himself."

Meanwhile, the two sons of Sujinpha had once, in the excitement of a hunting excursion, obstructed the path of the Burhagohain. The consequences of this discourtesy were exaggerated by Lao Barchetia, and stern measures against the princes were reported as being contemplated by the Burhagohain. They now planned to kill the premier when he was asleep in a neighbouring camp. Lao Barchetia having apprised him of the plot, the Burhagohain made good his escape and went home. This is how the double-faced Barchetia deepened the estrangement between the royal family and the premier.

Lao Barchetia now harnessed the services of a senior female attendant of the royal household. It was her duty to bring daily to the Burhagohain twenty trays of presents from the king. One day she warned the premier of the preparations made by the king for his capture, and she asked the premier to remain similarly prepared for an eventuality. The Burhagohain dismissed the lady after asking her to tell him more about the plot and promised to advance her rank. She then went to the king and told him that the Burhagohain was making elaborate preparations for attacking the monarch. The king believed the maid's story, and remained vigilant and prepared with his four sons. He posted additional men to guard the entrances of the palace, and appointed spies to keep watch over movements of the Burhagohain and his adherents.

The Phukans learned of the preparations made by the king, and they went in a body to the Burhagohain and suggested to him the advisability of the attacking the king before the latter completed the preparations. The Burhagohain did not support the proposal made by the Phukans, instead he put forward the proposal to meet the king in person for clarification of their doubts. Lao Barchetia, being afraid that the proposed meeting of the king and the nobles would result in the discovery of the part he was playing in fomenting the estrangement, persuaded the Barkuanri or the Chief Queen to warn the king of the dangers of an interview with the nobles, as it might give them an opportunity to accomplish some prearranged plan for the destruction of the monarch. The Queen in turn warned the king about the proposed meeting with the nobles. Therefore, when the nobles led by Atan Burhagohain visited the royal palace with the desire to meet the king, Sujinpha declined their request on the plea of his illness and asked the nobles to return home. From this incident the nobles realized the hostile attitude of king Sujinpha.

=== Failed palace coup by Burhagohain ===
King Sujinpha actively engaged himself in preparations to seize the persons of Atan Burhagohain and his supporters. He equipped the attendants of the palace with daos, shields, bows and arrows, and mounted guns at the several entrances. The four princes took charge of the preparations. A spy was set against each partisan of the Burhagohain to watch his movements and actions. Meanwhile, the trusted aides of Atan Burhagohain, Tepartalia Ram Phukan, Dilihial Langi Phukan, Kalanchu Phukan Govinda and Bhitarual Phukan Betmela, pressed the Burhagohain for immediate action to counteract the king's designs which, they were informed, would be put into operation the next day. The Phukan asked the Burhagohain to take the lead in their contemplated attack on the Palace. Initially, the Premier hesitated to take such drastic measure against the monarch, but at last yield to the wishes of his supporters.

On the night of Saturday, June 25, 1676 CE Atan Burhagohain and his supporters march towards the Palace properly armed. Atan Burhagohain asked his son-in-law, Ramcharan Borpatrogohain to join the party, but Ramcharan evaded immediate compliance, and promised to join up after having a bath. He however allowed half of his men to accompany the Burhagohain retaining the other half with him. The premier and the Phukans with a force of armed men entered the palace enclosure shortly after midnight. Having heard the commotion and uproar, Sujinpha woke up and saw the attackers in the courtyard. He at once grasped the position, rushed out of his room with a sword, attended by the armed guards of the palace, and killed whomsoever he met on the way. A shields-man of the king named Chatai-kukura, brandished his sword as he walked by the side of the king, and managed to put twelve attackers to death. Having seen the king, blazing with fury and revenge, the Burhagohain got down from his sedan, and stood at the open space near the Barchora or open courtyard. The Swargadeo approached the sedan in darkness and inflicted on it a few blows with his sword thinking that the premier was seated inside. Conceding defeat, Atan Burhagohain fled the capital and shifted his camp at Dergaon.

On the following morning the king assembled the leading nobles, and expatiated before them on the attack made by the Burhagohain which he characterized as unfriendly and unprovoked, as the premier himself had brought the prince from his ancestral home and seated him on the throne. "I could have killed the Burhagohain," said the king, "but I refrained from taking his life as we are co-disciples and have thus jointly attained companionship under the spiritual teachings of the Guru."

During the course of the deliberation on Sunday morning the king asked the officers and nobles to reaffirm their allegiance to him by taking the necessary oaths, according to both the Hindu and Ahom forms. The Hindu oaths were administered by Rama Misra and his son and other Brahmans in the presence of Lakshminarayan Salagram, Gita, Bhagavat, copper vessels and the basil plant. The Ahom oaths were taken in the presence of the Bardhak, or sacred drum, where pigs and fowls were sacrificed. The officers were given appropriate presents by the monarch after which they retired to their respective quarters.

=== Attempts for negotiation between Sujinpha and Atan Burhagohain ===
Soon after his flight from the capital, Atan Burhagohain sent Dilihial Gohain-Phukan and Ram Tamuli to Guwahati with a request to the Phukans and Rajkhowas stationed there that they should march up to his aid in fulfillment of their old promise to stand by one another in emergencies. The officers stationed at Guwahati immediately responded to call for aid from Atan Burhagohain and a large army led by Laluk Sola Borphukan marched upwards to the Burhagohain's camp.

Meanwhile, Sujinpha was anxious to compose his differences with the Burhagohain, had been sending emissaries to meet the latter at his camp. Atan Burhagohain tactfully avoided these emissaries and expressed his unwillingness to meet the king in person. The king first deputed the son of the Sakta priest Katyayan Bhattacharyya to Jakaichuk with messages of friendship and good-will, and desire for reconciliation; but the Burhagohain had already left Jakaichuk. The king then sent one Pathak Chandra Kataki, but on approaching the Burhagohain's camp, the Kataki was forbidden to enter the gate. The Borpatrogohain, the Borgohain, the Solal Gohain, Lao Barchetia, and the Mahanta of Moramara were then deputed by the monarch to the camp of the Burhagohain with the object of reconciliation; but they were not allowed to enter into the enclosures of the camp. The mission of Banamali Gosain of Dakhinpat, and of Ramakrishna Bapu of Bengena-ati Satra proved equally unsuccessful. The King became greatly alarmed, and regarded the persistent refusal of the Burhagohain to meet the deputies as a clear indication of the premier's unfriendly disposition. The Gohains together with the Barchetia were sent again to initiate negotiations with the Burhagohain for his return to the capital, under a solemn promise of pardon. Atan Burhagohain receive the envoys and listened to the king's message, but he was not convinced of the sincerity of these assurances and refused to submit. Atan Burhagohain tried to win over to his side the officers who had been sent to fetch him, and persuaded the Borgohain to desert the king's cause; he was unable to seduce Ramcharan Borpatrogohain from his allegiance, although he was his son-in-law, and so sent him under a guard to Koliabor. Lao Barchetia was also kept under custody by Atan Burhagohain.

=== Battle of Chinatali ===
Having received intelligence of the developments at Dergaon, Sujinpha repaired the fort at Chinatali, and remained there with a considerable force. There was a royalist garrison also at Gajpur. In the meantime Laluk Borphukan and the leading Guwahati commanders arrived at the Burhagohain's camp at Dergaon. The premier deliberated with his supporters, and decided to launch an attack upon the royalist forces at Gajpur and Chinatali.

On Wednesday, the twenty-ninth Ashar, 1598 Saka (1676 CE) the forces of Burhagohain boarded the boats at Dergaon and sailed up to Gajpur. The king's soldiers deserted the Gajpur garrison and regrouped with the king's garrison at Chinatali. The combined forces of Atan Burhagohain and Laluk Borphukan attacked the king's garrison at Chinatali, where a severe contest ensued in both on land and on water between both sides. The king's forces suffered heavy casualties, at which the monarch expressed his regret that so many men had to perish only for the safety of his person. He then retreated to Singhaduar, the principal gate of the capital, and encountered the ministerialist in an engagement on the river. The contest lasted till the evening when the royalist forces were completely defeated. Kirkiria Borbarua and Sujinpha's son Kalia Gohain protected the gate till the last moment, but they were soon defeated. The princes deserted the battlefield and fled to unknown destinations. The gate or duar of the city being now open after the defeat of Kirkiria Borbarua of the Duara family the Burhagohain said, - "We have got possession of the duar (literally, a door in Assamese language) after Duara (literally, a door-keeper in Assamese language) had relinquished it."

=== Imprisonment and deposal ===
Sujinpha left the scene of battlefield in a boat by which he sailed down a short distance, and stopped near a camp. The king got down of the boat, and an ostler from Bangaon spread his cloth before the king to walk upon. The Swargadeo left his camp on horseback accompanied by a Tamuli, his personal attendant, whom he proposed to encourage by a reward of cash. The king alighted from the pony at the gate of the camp, and had a box of coins brought to him. He asked the Tamuli to make a receptacle with the ends of his cloth. Sujinpha then poured into the Tamuli's cloth four handfuls of silver rupees. The king then asked the Tamuli to leave his company and offered to him a cloth-piece worn by himself, saying- "Tamuli, you have some years more to live, and I gave you this cloth from my own body as a token of affection for you. The texture of your cloth on which I poured the rupees is as fine as gossamer, but still it did not give way under the weight of the coins; it is not therefore proper that you should die with me." The Tamuli began to weep like a child, and then left the company of the king with a heavy heart. Sujinpha took shelter in his palace at Garhgaon to pass a few hours that might still be spared in the company of his wives and children. The king was kept under watch and guard at his palace in charge of Bhatdhara Phukan, brother of Laluk Sola Borphukan, the Ahom Viceroy of Lower Assam.

The Phukans and nobles pressed Atan Burhagohain to assume sovereign power, but the premier refused the offer stating that only members of Royal Ahom Dynasty, the direct descendant of first Ahom king Sukapha, were eligible for the throne. Therefore, he instituted a vigorous search for a prince worthy of occupying the exalted office of a sovereign. He then found a prince, who was the grandson of Prince Sukrang, the founder of Parvatia branch of Royal Ahom Dynasty son of Ahom king Suhungmung, living near Charaideo Hill, and proposed to place him on the throne. The prince selected by Atan Burhagohain was now brought from his residence at Charaideo hill and the nobles and other officers paid their homage to the new monarch. He was known as Parvatia Raja from the fact of his residence at Charaideo Paravat (literally means hills). He assumed the Ahom name Sudoipha.

== Death ==
After ascending the throne, the new king Sudoipha and his ministers then discussed the method of disposing of the deposed sovereign Sujinpha. His continuance as an able-bodied person would provide a handy material for insurrection and trouble, and so it was decided to disable him by extracting his eyeballs, as a mutilated limb was considered to be a disqualification for holding the office of a monarch. Bhatdhara Phukan and Betmela Phukan were entrusted with the execution of the decree. Sujinpha was waiting for the approach of the two Phukans with the manuscript of the sacred book Ratnavali tied to his breast, and his youngest son seated on his lap, hoping thereby that his person would be held sacrosanct and therefore unassailable, touched as it was by sacred book and an innocent child. Bhatdhara removed the manuscript with his feet, threw off the child from his father's lap, and dragged Sujinpha from his seat, after which he applied to Sujinpha's eyes the apparatus for extracting eyeballs. Having carried out his mission Bhatdhara battered the blinded prince, agonized with shock and pain, with the butt-end of a gun, and Sujinpha died in consequence. Bhatdhara then entered the ladies' apartments, and ravished the queen just widowed.

Atan Burhagohain disapproved of the excesses committed by Bhatdhara, and expelled him from the conference of the nobles held in the premier's residence next day. Bhatdhara was allotted a seat in the open space outside the conference-chamber. He was also refused admittance to the secret deliberations of the Phukans held later in the inner apartments of the Burhagohain's house.

Another version states that fearing that the premier was going to kill him, at the approach of Bhatdhara Phukan and his henchmen, Sujinpha committed suicide by swallowing poison, holding the sacred Ratnavali manuscript close to his chest.

According to another account, Sujinpha committed suicide by striking his head against a stone after he had been deprived of his eyesight. Of the king's four sons the eldest, Dighala, managed to escape; while the second son Kalia Gohain was blinded and sent to Namrup, and the two youngest sons Dhala Gohain and Saru Gohain were put to death. The king's body was buried at Charaideo. This was in July 1677 CE.

== Character and legacy ==
Sujinpha was predominantly a man of peace; and he abhorred harshness and cruelty except when his impetuosity led him to actions which brought him to repentance with the revival of reason. He was grateful by disposition and upbringing, and he hesitated to disbelieve the counsels of his immediate associates lest he offended their sentiments by his distrust. But he lacked the qualities of quick decision and prompt action which are so indispensable to a man of affairs. Passing his days in Dihing in the leisurely comforts of a gentleman-farmer he was suddenly called at the age of forty to assume the onerous responsibilities of a sovereign for which he had practically no training except the normal experiences of a prince's surroundings. The Problem of the state and the intrigues of the period proved to be too complicated for him, and he constantly referred to his palmy princely days passed in Dihing in contrast to his thorny life at Garhgaon as the head of state. Sujinpha lost his throne and his life as a retribution for his imbecility as a sovereign; however unsurpassed he might have been in the sphere of refinement and good breeding.

== Bibliography ==
- Barbaruah, Hiteswar (1981). Ahomor Din (in Assamese). Guwahati: Publication Board of Assam.
- Bhuyan, S K (1957). Atan Burhagohain and his times. Guwahati: Lawyers Book Stall.
- Bhuyan, S K, ed. (1968). Tunkhungia Buranji (2 ed.). Guwahati: Lawyers Book Stall.
- Gait, Edward A (1906), A History of Assam, Calcutta, ISBN 9780404168193
- Gogoi, Padmeswar (1968). The Tai and the Tai Kingdoms. Guwahati: Department of Publications, Gauhati University.
