= Baduli Borphukan =

Borphukan of the Ahom Kingdom (service year ?-1663)

Phu kon Lung Baduli Borphukan

Borphukan of the Ahom Kingdom
- Monarch: Jayadhwaj Singha aka Sutamla
- Preceded by: Chengmun Borphukan
- Succeeded by: Ghorakonwar

Personal details
- Born: Chiring Tai Ahom Kingdom
- Children: Baduli Dekaphukan
- Parent: Lan Tai Lung Tamuli (father)
- Relatives: Momai Tamuli Borbarua (brother); Laluk Sola Borphukan (nephew); Lachit Borphukan (nephew); Bhardhora Borphukan (nephew); Marangi Borbarua (nephew); Lao Deka (nephew); Datukari (nephew); Pakhori Gabharu (nephew); Ramani Gabharu (grand daughter)

Baduli Borphukan, also known as Baduli Roja Sahur, was a loyal administrative officer in the Ahom Kingdom, serving during the reign of Ahom king Jayadhwaj Singha (1648-1663 CE). He was also the brother of Momai Tamuli Borbarua, a prominent minister in the Ahom kingdom. As a Borphukan, Baduli Roja Sahur played a crucial role in the Ahom Kingdom's defense against the Mughal Empire. He fought valiantly against the Mughal Subahdar (governor) Mir Jumla II, who led a campaign against the Ahom Kingdom in the 17th century. Additionally, he played a key role in developing the kingdom's infrastructure, constructing the Seuni Ali road from Jorhat to the capital city Garhgaon. This road facilitated communication, and military movements, showcasing his vision and leadership. Baduli Borphukan's legacy continued through his son, Baduli Dekaphukan and grandson Maupia Phukan.

== Bibliography ==
- Barbaruah, Hiteswar (1981). Ahomor Din (in Assamese). Guwahati: Publication Board of Assam.
- Bhuyan, S K, ed. (1968). Tunkhungia Buranji (2 ed.). Guwahati: Lawyers Book Stall.
- Gait, Edward A (1926), A History of Assam (2 ed.), Calcutta
- Gogoi, Padmeswar (1968). The Tai and the Tai Kingdoms. Guwahati: Department of Publications, Gauhati University.
