= Suhung =

Ahom king from 1674 to 1675

- Chaopha Swargadeo of Ahom Kingdom

Ahom King
- Reign: 1674 – 1675
- Predecessor: Ramadhwaj Singha
- Successor: Gobar Raja
- Born: Khamjang Konwar; Ahom kingdom
- Died: c. 1675; Ahom kingdom
- Consort: Pakhari Gabharu
Names
- Samaguria Rojaa Khamjang
- House: Samuguria
- Dynasty: Ahom dynasty
- Religion: Ahom religion Hinduism

Suhung (born Khamjang Konwar; died 1675) also known as the Samaguria Rojaa, was Ahom King from 1674 until his assassination in 1675.

While most of the chronicles put the number of days of his reign as 20, in some chronicles the duration of his reign was shown as one month and fifteen days. Suhung was installed as king of Ahom kingdom by Debera Borbarua after the latter poisoned Ahom king Ramdhwaj Singha. His reign was characterized by the atrocities committed by his minister Debera Borbarua. Finally, Suhung decided to get rid of Debera Borbarua and put an end to his reign of tyranny, but the powerful minister outsmarted the king, by secretly poisoning his medicine and killing him.

== Ancestry and accession ==
Suhung was the descendant of Ahom king Suhungmung and is also known in the Buranjis as the Samuguria king since he belonged to the Samuguria branch of the Ahom dynasty. He was known as Chamaguriya Kamjang Konwar (Chao Khamjang). After poisoning Ramdhwaj Singha to death, Debera Borbarua installed Suhung, a maternal nephew of Kachalukhowa Solal Gohain, as the king of Ahom Kingdom. Debera also placed several ladies of noble origins in the inner apartments of Suhung, who also served as his secret agents and informants. Pakhari Gabharu, daughter of Momai Tamuli Borbarua and sister of Lachit Borphukan and Laluk Sola Borphukan, was selected as the Barkunwari or chief consort for Suhung. Previously she was the consort of Swargadeo Jaydhwaj Singha and Swargadeo Chakradhwaj Singha and therefore was well versed with the politics of the state.

== Reign ==
=== Elimination of Royal Princes by Debera Borbarua ===
Meanwhile, other princes of Ahom dynasty began their endeavor to claim the throne. Narayan Gohain Tipam Raja, brother of Ramdhwaj Singha the previous king, having heard of his brother's death marched towards the capital Garhgaon accompanied by Kachalukhowa Solal Gohain with the object of becoming king. Debera Borbarua rides out with his two lieutenants Ratanpuria and Dakhinpatia, to meet the prince's forces. In the fight that ensued, Narayan Gohain was defeated and he fell into a wayside ditch. It is said that Debera then said, 'Oh, prince, come near and don't be afraid. Whom shall I appoint king but Your Highness?' After having brought the prince near and having dressed him in the attire and ornaments of a king, Debera said to his lieutenants, 'Well, Ratanpuria and Dakhinpatia, what are you looking at? Make the Gohaindeo king.' The two henchmen took the hint and killed Narayan Gohain and Kachalukhowa Solal Gohain. Debera Borbarua then decided to get rid of other potential claimants to the throne. Ban Gohain Namrupia Raja, another brother of Swargadeo Ramdhwaj Singha was killed at Namrup by Chetia Patar, an emissary of Debera. The fourteen sons of Swargadeo Udayaditya Singha were put to death.

=== Envoy from Kachari Kingdom ===
It was customary for the rulers of the Kachari kingdom to send greetings to newly installed kings of the Ahom kingdom. The Kachari envoy arrived with letters and presents for Swargadeo Ramdhwaj Singha. When they arrived at the Capital Garhgaon, they learned of the death of Ramdhwaj Singha and the accession of Suhung as the new king. Still, the Ahom officials received the envoy and granted his wish for an interview with Swargadeo Suhung. After the customary reception in the court, Suhung informed the envoy that he would not open or read any letters meant for a former monarch. Therefore he instructed the Kachari envoy to return and bring letters addressed to him.

=== Atrocities of Debera Borbarua ===
In order to establish firm control over the administration, Debera Borbarua began to kill the officers and nobles who were suspected of enmity towards him or who had means to effect his destruction. The modus operandi adopted by Debera in his campaign of slaughter was as follows: when an official visited the court in connection with his duties, Debera would announce to him that the king was offended with him and had, therefore, asked him to renounce his office and retire to his house. The officer would then be deprived of his retainers and insignia of office. The two lieutenants of Debera, Ratanpuria, and Dakhinpatia would then be instructed to escort the dismissed officer to his home, who would be cut into pieces on the way. In this way Debera caused the destruction of a large number of officials belonging to the establishment at Garhgaon. Debera planned to murder a prominent Ahom noble, Simaluguria Naobaicha Phukan, son of Chengdhara Barbarua of Chiringdang family. Fearing for life, the Phukan did not stir out of the house on the plea of illness. Debera engaged a woman of ill repute to visit the house of the Phukan on the pretext of rendering some domestic service. She came back and reported to Debera about the faked illness of the Phukan whereupon Debera sought opportunities to get the Phukan murdered. However, Gomotha Bhandari Barua was not lucky enough as he was caught and executed by the henchmen sent by Debera Borbarua. For all these high-handed actions neither did Debera seek permission from the king nor did he provide any explanation to the monarch.

=== Suhung plans to kill Debera Borbarua ===
Debera's atrocities roused the attention of Swargadeo Suhung's chief queen Pakhari Gabharu. She then said to her Royal husband,--'You are king only in name if Debera is allowed to wield power like this.' She pointed out to the monarch his reduction to a nonentity in view of the unbridled authority of Debera Borbarua. Suhung having realized the significance of his chief queen's misgivings held secret consultation with her, and Simaluguria Naobaicha Phukan, the arch-rival of Debera Borbarua and Laitai Deodhai, a Tai-Ahom priest and decided to kill Debera. The proceedings of this conclave were conducted in Tai-Ahom language which was the original dialect of the Ahom rulers and which had now fallen into comparative obsoleteness owing to their adoption of Assamese language as the language of the court.

== Death ==
Meanwhile, a maid in attendance at the meeting discovered the plan, and she forthwith informed Debera Borbarua of his impending destruction. To counter the plan of his opposition, Debera immediately decided to take drastic steps. Debera Borbarua secretly administered poison in the medicine of Swargadeo Suhung, which resulted in the death of the king. After the death of Suhung, Debera Borbarua entered in the inner apartments of the Royal Palace, where he met the Chief Queen, Pakhari Gabharu and said,--'You are formerly a Tamuli Kunwari or a junior consort of Jaydhwaj Singha, and it was I who raised you to the rank of Borkunwari, or the Chief Queen of the Samuguria Raja, and you dare to speak like this?' The Queen was put to death and the body was placed at the feet of the deceased monarch at the Moidam or Royal Tomb. The Simaluguria Naobaicha Phukan was also killed, but Laitai Deodhai's life was spared as he belonged to an Ahom priestly clan.

== Legacy ==
Suhung's reign lasted only for some twenty days which was characterized by atrocities and the ministerial dictatorship of Debera Borbarua. Many officers at the capital Garhgaon were killed, replaced by Debera's favorites. Since most of the prominent nobles, including Atan Burhagohain and Laluk Sola Borphukan were at Guwahati, in anticipation of an attack by Mughals, after their defeat in the Battle of Saraighat, Debera Borbarua got the opportunity to wield supreme power and assumed the role of king-maker. Suhung's attempt to reestablish the administration, by getting rid of Debera resulted in failure spelling doom for him, his wife and his supporters.

== See also ==
- Garhgaon
- Jaintia kingdom
- Kachari kingdom
- Sibsagar district
