= Debera Borbarua =

De facto ruler of the Ahom Kingdom

Borbarua of the Ahom Kingdom
- In office c.1672–1675
- Monarchs: Ramadhwaj Singha; Suhung; Gobar Roja; Sujinphaa
- Preceded by: Ghorakonwar Borbarua
- Succeeded by: Marangi Borbarua

Personal details
- Born: Lechai
- Died: May 1675
- Parent: Kharagom (father)
- Occupation: Statesman; administrator

Debera Borbarua (born Lechai; died May 1675), formerly known as Debera Hazarika, was an Ahom statesman and administrator who was the de facto ruler of the Ahom Kingdom from 1673 until his deposal in 1675. Dubbed "the Kingmaker", he was instrumental in the deposition of at least three kings, and the murder of numerous royal princes, consorts, and officials in his attempts to seize power.

Debera rose to political prominence in opposition to king Udayaditya Singha, and Debera helped orchestrate the downfall of the king. He was replaced by Ramadhwaj Singha, who appointed Debera as the Borbarua. In opposition to the planned successors of the king while the monarch fell ill, Debera assassinated him and replaced him with Suhung of the Samaguri branch.

During the reign of Suhung, Debera excercised de facto rule and orchestrated the killing of numerous royal princes, including the fourteen sons of Udayaditya Singha and other potential claimants. After murdering Suhung, Debera placed Gobar Roja of the Tungkhungia branch on the throne. Debera was in power for around thirty months, before being deposed and executed by prime minister Atan Burhagohain.

== Origins and background ==
Debera was a member of the Ahom Lukhurakhun clan, the son of Kharagom, an Ahom officer who had been killed in the Dafala campaign in 1672. His family was from Dakhinpat in Majuli.

He went on to hold the rank of a Hazarika, commander of one thousand men.

== Rise to power ==
=== Deposition of Udayaditya Singha ===
==== Background ====
King Udayaditya Singha became deeply devoted to Paramananda Sannyasi, a guru who had recently risen to fame, and in his eagerness to advance his prestige, Singha summoned the twelve Vaishanava Mahantas or religious heads of the Thakuria denomination and asked them to become disciples of the Gakulpuri Sannyasi. The Mahantas refused and were subsequently imprisoned; the king only agreed to release them if they demonstrated their spiritual authority by performing a miracle. They stated that they were unable to perorm miracles, and were instead devoted to reciting and hearing the glory of god, but the king remained convinced that Paramanda possessed spiritual greatness and insisted they should accept him as the guru. The Thakuria Mahantas continued to resist the attempts of the king, and secretly received support from the three Gohains.

Debera emerged as the leader of the anti-Paramananda movement; he was a follower of the Thakuria Mahantas and was determined to reduce the influence of Paramananda. He knelt before the Mahantas and stated "your Holinesses should only bestow upon me the dust of your feet, and I shall do whatever redress is necessary."

The king soon became aware of the opposition to him and Paramananda by Debera, and in an effort to remove Debera from the capital, he ordered him to lead an expedition against the Mishmi rebels at Sadiya. Debera understood, however, the real intention of the king and avoided an immediate departure by saying that he would set out after three days as he was recovering from illness. The same night, he met with the three Dangarias and persuaded them to support the Sarugohain, the younger brother of the king, in attempt to seize the throne. The Sarugohain agreed, saying that they could not "tolerate this impious situation".

==== Palace Coup and assassination of Udayaditya Singha ====
The Sarugohain along with Debera, Debera's brother Mohan Deka, and other officials gathered around one thousand followers for an assault on the royal palace at Haithaguri. The king heard about the conspiracy and ordered the gates of the city to he closed, but the conspirators broke through the palace gates with elephants and killed the guards. Numerous officials including the Borborua were killed as the Sarugohain approached the royal hall.

Udayaditya Singha was asleep in his bedchamber at the time of the attack. He was woken up briefly, but was convinced by the guard who had been won over by Debera that the noise was unimportant. Debera and Mohan Deka removed the ladder leading to the royal apartments, and the Sarugohain placed himself in the audience hall with stationed guards in the palace compound. Sarugohain then proclaimed himself king, and Ghorakonwar was appointed Borbarua.

The following day, Udayaditya was executed, with some sources claiming it was through poisoning by Debera. Paramananda was also arrested by Debera, and subsequently tortured and executed.

=== Career under Ramadhwaj Singha ===
==== Conspiracy against Bargohain and Charing Raja ====
After the accession of Ramadhwaj Singha, Debera was furious at not having gained a more important position rather than Hazarika given his role in deposing Udayaditya Singha, and began to desire the Borbarua position. He realised that he could not get the position in a normal way, as the incumbent Ghorakonwar Borbarua was strongly favoured by the monarch, so decided to use alternative methods.

Debera along with other officials manufactured a conspiracy, accusing Lagichang Barukial Bargohain of planning to kill the king and replace him with Moran Gohain, Charing Raja, son of Udayaditya Singha. Debera personally informed the king about the conspiracy, and the king was later informed that the Charing Raja had taken the palace at Gargaon. The king sent a messenger to investigate the allegation, but found Gargaon to be empty; Debera explained this away by saying that the prince did not come and that the plan had been abandoned. Debera produced witnesses to support the conspiracy allegations, which led to the king having both the Charing Raja and Bargohain put to death with no trial.

==== Appointment of Debera and Bargohain ====
Debera subsequently accused Ghorakonwar of being implicated in the conspiracy; Debera then replaced him as Borbarua. Debera's nephew Chengmung, the son of his brother Nakjoi Dulia Barua and the husband of a royal princess, was appointed Bargohain.

==== Succession disputes ====
Ramadhwaj Singha began to grow ill, and this combined with the death of the Bargohain made him decide to draw up plans for succession in case of his death. Kalia Gohain, the son of Udayaditya Singha, as well as Narayan Gohain Tipam Raja and Ban Gohain Namrupia Raja, the brothers of the king, were suggested. Debera opposed these candidates as he felt that his role in deposing Udayaditya, the father and brother of the candidates would be detrimental to Debera and his supporters.

Debera then massacred the Phukans and Hazarikas who supported the candidate Debera disliked; the king then ordered that Debera be put to death. But Debera was warned of the officials who were going to kill him, and subsequently prepared for the event and massacred many more officials. Debera then directed for the physician of the king to mix poison with the medicine of the king; leading to the death of the king in November 1674.

== De facto ruler ==
=== Appointment of kings ===
After the death of Ramadhwaj Singha, Debera placed a prince of the Tungkhungia line on the throne whose name is omitted from historical records. He was killed by Debera for unknown reasons, and not recognised historically as a king as this required the support of nobles rather than just the appointment by Debera. Debera then installed Suhung of the Samaguria branch as the king. Debera was the de facto ruler of the kingdom.

Several of the consorts of Suhung were installed as informants for Debera. Pakhori Gabharu was instructed by Debera to inform the king of the formalities of office, while Ahalya Gabharu informed Debera of the ongoings in the royal palace. The daughter of the Marangi Barua, another consort, was entrusted with similar duties to Pakhori Gabharu, while Debera also employed several maids in the royal household.

=== Suhung as king ===
==== Massacre of Royal princes and officials ====
Narayan Gohain Tipam Raja, the brother of Ramdhwaj Singha, having heard of his brother's death went towards the capital Garhgaon to become king. The two henchmen took killed Narayan Gohain at the behest of Debera. He then decided to get rid of other potential claimants to the throne. Ban Gohain Namrupia Raja, was killed at Namrup by Chetia Patar, an emissary of Debera, and the fourteen sons of Udayaditya Singha were put to death.

In order to establish stronger control over the administration, Debera began to kill the officers and nobles who were against him. His plan was that when officials came to court, they would be told that they had offended the king and would be stripped of their positions and escorted home by two lieutenants of Debera, who would then murder the official. This led to the deaths of many officials at Garhgaon.

==== Deposal of Suhung ====
Debera's atrocities caused the chief consort of Suhung, Pakhari Gabharu to oppose him, and told the king that his authority was in question due to Debera. Simaluguria Naobaicha Phukan (the arch-rival of Debera), Laitai Deodhai, the king and queen all decided to assassinate Debera in a secret meeting. A maid in attendance overheard and warned Debera of the plan; Debera then secretly poisoned Suhung. The Queen was also then put to death and the body was placed at the feet of the deceased monarch at the Moidam. Simaluguria Naobaicha Phukan was also killed, but Laitai Deodhai's life was spared as he was from an Ahom priestly clan.

=== Appointment of Gobar Roja ===
After deposing Suhung, Debera installed Gobar Gohain of the Tungkhungia line on the throne and assumed dictatorial power. He purged his opponents from the capital, and then turned his attention to nobles stationed at Guwahati. Ghorakonwar Phukan, the brother of Tangachu Rajkhowa, Sologuria Rajkhowa and his son Chanda Rajkhowa, Opar Dayangia Rajkhowa and his brother, and Medelial Rajkhowa and his son were all taken to Laotoli where they were killed.

== Deposal and execution ==
To secure his position, Debera planned to assassinate Atan Burhagohain, the prime minister, and Laluksola Borphukan. He sent his own henchmen to request for them to come from Guwahati to the capital, but they were warned against this. The officials called on the Burhagohain to depose Debera from his position.

An army under the Burhagohain was despatched in April 1675; Debera was at the time living with his wives at Chomdeo. He left his residence, but his army deserted him. Debera attempted to flee but was captured. It was proposed to press him to death between wooden cylinders, but instead his body was cut slice by slice with a hoe, beginning with feet up to the head. The accomplices of Debera shared similar fates, and the closest male relatives of Debera were also put to death.

== Character and legacy ==
In the book Atan Buragohain and his times by Surya Kumar Bhuyan, Debera was described as a man "not to let the grass grow green under his feet". It also asserted that "in the whole recorded history of Assam Debera occupies the topmost place among political intriguers and murderers ". It assessed that "Debera's case was not one of “motiveless malignity”, as continued absorption in machinations and murders was necessary for his very preservation. He developed revolutionary propensities, and stopped the functioning of the normal government, the restoration of which would spell disaster to himself".

Gait described Debera as a "born intriguer". For his role in the deposition of numerous monarchs, he has been described as a "Kingmaker" in Ahom history.
