= Gobar Raja =

Ahom king in 1675

- Chaopha Swargadeo of Ahom Kingdom

Ahom King
- Reign: May 1675
- Predecessor: Suhung
- Successor: Sujinpha
- Born: Gobar Gohain; Ahom kingdom
- Died: 23 May 1675; Bhogbari, Ahom kingdom
- Issue: Bauli Gabharu; Gadadhar Singha; Jambor Gohain
- House: Tungkhungia
- Dynasty: Ahom
- Father: Saranga Gohain
- Religion: Ahom religion Hinduism

Gobar Raja (born Gobar Gohain; died 23 May 1675) was Ahom King for twenty-one days in May 1675. He was the first King from the Tungkhungia branch of the Ahom dynasty, and the father of Gadadhar Singha.

Gobar was installed to the throne by Debera Borbarua, a powerful officer in the capital Garhgaon. He was the last king installed by Debera before both were removed and executed by the Saraighatia Ahom officers under the leadership of Atan Burhagohain.

== Ancestry ==
Gobar was the son of Saranga Gohain, the son of Suteng, the third son of Suhungmung. His grandfather Suteng Namrupia Raja was the founder of the Tungkhungia line of the Ahom dynasty, to which the final set of Ahom kings of Assam belonged.

== Accession to the throne ==
After the deposition and execution of Udayaditya Singha in 1672, the Ahom kingdom entered into a period of weak kings, with de facto power wielded, successively, by three prominent ministers: Debera Borbarua, Atan Burhagohain, and Laluk Sola Borphukan. Debera Borbarua, the first such minister, rose in prominence and exerted complete authority over the administration in Garhgaon, the Ahom capital, at a time when many powerful ministers were at guard at newly-occupied Guwahati soon after the Battle of Saraighat (thus these officers were called Saraighatias). Debera's period of control saw three kings being deposed and put to death, within a short period of about three years. After Udayaditya Singha, he installed and subsequently deposed two others: Ramdhwaj Singha and Suhung. Gobar Gohain from the Tungkhungia line was the last king he installed, which he did in May 1675.

== Reign ==
=== Activities of Debera Borbarua ===
After installing Gobar on the throne, Lesai Hazarika aka Debera assumed dictatorial power. By a series of cold-blooded murders Debera purged the capital of his opponents and rivals, though most of the powerful Ahom nobles were stationed at Guwahati. Debera then turned his attention to the Ahom nobles stationed at Guwahati. Debera sent his agent Lao Deka, brother of Laluk Sola Borphukan, to Guwahati under the alleged orders of the king and summoned the following nobles to the capital: Ghorakonwar Phukan ex-Borbarua, the brother of Tangachu Rajkhowa, Sologuria Rajkhowa and his son Chanda Rajkhowa, Opar Dayangia Rajkhowa and his brother, and Medelial Rajkhowa and his son. When they reached Garhgaon, they were taken to Laotoli where they were killed. Debera also planned to kill Lao Deka, the younger brother of Laluk Sola Borphukan, but his execution was postponed to an appropriate occasion in future.

=== Nobles rose against Debera ===
In order to secure his position for the future, Debera Borbarua planned to get rid of Atan Burhagohain and Laluk Sola Borphukan. Two agents of Debera-Betmela and Lao Deka of Dihingia Khatowal Chetia family-were dispatched to Guwahati to bring Laluk Sola Borphukan to Garhgaon. They carried with them an order purportedly from the king. They were also instructed by Debera to bring the Burhagohain with them if possible. Betmela and this lieutenant Lao Deka reached Guwahati and communicated the royal orders to the nobles of Guwahati at the Dopdar or the Borphukan's court. Since it was evening, the officers retired to their respective camps having postponed their deliberations till next day. Khamat Pachani, the son of the Burhagohain arrived at Guwahati the next day and warned his father not to follow the royal orders as they were actually from Debera Borbarua. He also described the fate of the previous officers who were executed after being called from Guwahati to the capital. Atan Burhagohain along with Laluk Sola Borphukan held consultations with the Phukans, the Rajkhowas and the Hazarikas stationed at Guwahati to discuss their future course of action. The officers consulted together and said to Atan Burhagohain,-‘Your Lordship is living in flesh and blood. One single man Debera is making and unmaking kings and deposing and killing us as well. Your lordship should come to our rescue at this critical juncture. We the people have accepted you as our head, and your lordship should not disclaim us.’ Saying this the officers bowed down to Burhagohain seven times. The Burhagohain said in reply,-‘Now that the people have acknowledged me as their leader I am never going to leave them.’ The Phukans, Rajkhowas, and others of the Guwahati establishment entered into a solemn league and covenant to abide by the directions of the Burhagohain, and support each other in all circumstances and events. They placed before them articles sacred to the Vaishnavas,- the manuscripts of Gita, Bhagavat and Ratnavali; Salagram, copper, and the tulasi or basil plant; and in the presence of the Brahmans they took the following oath,-“If we act contrary to the plans and orders of Your Excellency all the merits which we have earned hitherto will be nullified, our ancestors will be doomed to perdition and go to hell. Besides, we promise not to desert one another."

=== Debera Borbarua imprisoned and executed ===
The expedition under Atan Burhagohain left Guwahati early in April 1675, and proceeded by land as well as water. Debera Borbarua was living at that time with his wives near the temple of Chomdeo. Having heard of the approach of the Guwahati army he left his residence in battle-array solemnizing the occasion by beheading Lao Deka, brother of Laluk Sola Borphukan, at the principal entrance of the capital city of Garhgaon. Seeing the futility of resisting the army of Guwahati nobles, Debera’s army deserted him. His nephew Chengmung Borgohain deserted Debera's camp and went over to the camp of Atan Burhagohain. Debera took to his heels but was subsequently captured. He was subjected to severe abuse and insults. He was put in a pig's cage and brought out with his senior wife raised on his head. At the trial before Laluk Sola Borphukan, his junior wife was placed on his shoulders. The Borphukan asked Debera to state the reasons which had led him to commit such barbarities. To this Debera replied, "Have you not heard that we are all made of the same stuff? I have finished composing my share of Dasama verses, and you in your turn will compose the rest." Debera was then killed at Rajahat, being hoed from head to foot.

== Deposal and execution ==
Meanwhile, Gobar Raja had been deposed and kept in confinement at Haithaguri. After finishing their affairs with Debera Borbarua, Atan Burhagohain held consultations with other nobles. The nobles offered the crown to Atan Burhagohain and declared their intention to make him the king, but Burhagohain gently declined the offer stating that only members of Royal Ahom Dynasty, the direct descendants of Sukaphaa were alone eligible to become kings. Therefore, he nominated a prince from Namrupia branch of Royal Ahom Dynasty, named Arjun Konwar as the king of the Ahom kingdom. Atan Burhagohain held consultations with the new king and other nobles and decided to get rid of Gobar. Gobar was transferred to a place called Bhogbari, where he along with his younger brother Nisaranga Gohain was put to death. This happened on 23 May 1675.

== Legacy ==
Gobar ruled for a very short duration during the period of ministerial supremacy in Ahom kingdom. Since Debera Borbarua held the real authority, Gobar was nothing more than a mere figurehead in the affairs of the royal court. The circumstances which allowed Gobar to sit on the throne were also responsible for his deposition and death. His short reign witnessed the fall of the ministerial dictatorship of Debera Borbarua and the rise of Atan Burhagohain at Garhgaon. Even though Gobar’s reign was very short, he will be remembered as the first king from the famous Tungkhungia branch of Royal Ahom dynasty, as his son Gadadhar Singha firmly established the power of the monarch in 1681 putting an end to the period of ministerial supremacy. The Tungkhungia branch of Ahom dynasty would reign for the remaining period of Ahom rule till 1826.
