= Jogeswar Singha =

Ahom King

Swargadeo Jogeswar Singha
- Chaopha Swargadeo of Ahom Kingdom

Ahom King
- Reign: 1821 – 1825 (Note: Historians dispute regarding the date of his deposition from the throne, as some historians claimed that he was deposed by his Burmese masters, after they secured complete victory over the forces of Chandrakanta Singha in 1822 CE, while some sources claimed that he remained as a puppet ruler till termination of Burmese rule in Assam by British East India Company, in 1825 CE, during First Anglo-Burmese War.)
- Predecessor: Chandrakanta Singha
- Successor: Purandar Singha
- Born: Ahom kingdom
- Died: 1825; Ahom kingdom
- Issue: Dambarudhar Singha; Padmavati Aideau
- House: Tungkhungia
- Dynasty: Ahom
- Father: Baga Konwar, Tipam Raja
- Religion: Hinduism

Jogeswar Singha (died 1825) was Ahom King from 1821 until his deposition in 1825. A member of the Ahom dynasty and its cadet branch the Tungkhungia line, he was a descendant of King Gobar Roja.

Singha was more or less a puppet in the hands of the Burmese, who held the real power of administration. His reign witnessed Burmese atrocities on the people of Assam and the attempts made by Chandrakanta Singha and Purandar Singha to expel Burmese invaders.

Historians dispute regarding the date of his deposition from the throne, as some historians claimed that he was deposed by his Burmese masters, after they secured complete victory over the forces of Chandrakanta Singha in 1822 CE, while some sources claimed that he remained as a puppet ruler till termination of Burmese rule in Assam by British East India Company, in 1825 CE, during First Anglo-Burmese War.

== Ancestry and family ==
Jogeswar Singha was the eldest son of Baga Konwar, Tipam Raja, who was a descendant of Jambar Gohain, Charing Raja, the younger brother of Swargadeo Gadadhar Singha. Baga Konwar was holding the rank of Tipam Raja. Apart from Jogeswar, Bogakonwar had three daughters, Taravati Aideo, Sarupahi Aideo and Hemo Aideo, and three sons, Mantan Charing Raja, Bihuram alias Biswanath, Tipam Raja and Dhaniram Gohain.

== Events leading to his accession ==
=== Internal turmoil and first Burmese invasion ===
In 1815 CE, Purnananda Burhagohain, the Prime Minister of Ahom kingdom, sent a deputation to arrest Badan Chandra Borphukan, the Ahom viceroy at Guwahati, who was charged for atrocities committed on the people of Lower Assam, but, being warned in time by his daughter, Pijou Gabharu, who had married one of the Premier's sons, he escaped to Bengal. He proceeded to Calcutta, and alleging that Purnananda Burhagohain was subverting the Ahom Government and ruining the country, endeavored to persuade the Governor-General Lord Hastings to dispatch an expedition against Purnananda Burhagohain. Lord Hasting, however, refused to interfere in any way. Meanwhile, Badan Chandra had stuck up a friendship with the Calcutta Agent of the Burmese government and he went with this man to the Court of Amarapura, where he was accorded an interview with the Burmese king, Bodawpaya. He repeated his misrepresentations regarding the conduct of Purnananda Burhagohain, alleging that he had usurped the King's authority, and that owing to his misgovernment, the lives of all, both high and low, were in danger. At last he obtained a promise of help. Towards the end of the year 1816 an army of about eight thousand men under the command of General Maha Minhla Minkhaung was dispatch from Burma with Badan Chandra Borphukan. It was joined en route by the chiefs of Mungkong, Hukong and Manipur, and, by the time Namrup was reached, its number had swollen to about sixteen thousand. Purnananda Burhagohain sent an army to oppose the invaders. A battle was fought at Ghiladhari in which the Assamese army was routed. At this juncture Purnananda Burhagohain died or some say, committed suicide by swallowing diamonds, leaving the entire Ahom government leaderless. His eldest son, Ruchinath was appointed as Burhagohain. The Ahom war council decided to continue the war; and a fresh army was hastily equipped and sent to resist the Burmese. Like the former one, it was utterly defeated, near Kathalbari east of Dihing. The Burmese continued their advance pillaging and burning the villages along their line of march. Ruchinath Burhagohain endeavored in vain to induce the reigning Ahom monarch Chandrakanta Singha to retreat to Western Assam, and then, perceiving that the latter intended to sacrifice him, in order to conciliate Badan Chandra and his Burmese allies, fled westwards to Guwahati. The Burmese occupied the capital Jorhat and Badan Chandra triumphantly entered the capital, interviewed Chandrakanta Singha and offered to run the affairs of the state as his capacity as Mantri-Phukan or Prime Minister. The young king, Chandrakanta had no alternative but to acquiesce in Badan Chandra's proposal. Badan Chandra now became all powerful and he used his Burmese allies to plunder and slay all the relations and adherents of Purnananda Burhagohain.

=== Marriage of Hemo Aideo with Bodawpaya ===
Meanwhile, Chandrakanta Singha and Badan Chandra made treaty with the Burmese general. The Burmese general demanded an Ahom princess in marriage for the Burmese monarch, along with other presents. The youngest daughter of Bagakonwar Tipam Raja, Jogeswar's sister, Hemo Aideo was selected to become consort of Burmese king Bodawpaya. The Burmese army returned to their country, taking with them Hemo Aideo and other gifts, offered to Burmese king Bodawpaya, in April 1817CE. Bihuram alias Bishwanath Tipam Raja, one of the brothers of Jogeswar, also accompanied his sister to Burma.

=== Political instability and second Burmese invasion ===
After some time, political scenario in Ahom kingdom changed drastically. Badan Chandra Borphukan was assassinated by his political rivals. Seizing this opportunity, Ruchinath Burhagohain, son of late Purnananda Burhagohain, the Prime Minister of Ahom kingdom, deposed Chandrakanta Singha and installed Purandar Singha, son of Brajanath Gohain, who was the great-grandson of Ahom king Swargadeo Rajeswar Singha, on the throne, in February, 1818 CE. Chandrakanta Singha was mutilated on his right ear, in order to make him ineligible for the throne, and was exiled. Meanwhile, the friends of Badan Chandra Borphukan went to the court of Burmese monarch Bodawpaya and appealed for help. Bodawpaya, owing to his marriage to Hemo Aideo, had an alliance with Chandrakanta Singha, immediately dispatched a fresh army of 30,000 men under a general named Alungmingi, also known as Kiamingi Borgohain. The Burmese defeated the forces of Purandar Singha and Ruchinath Burhagohain and entered the Capital Jorhat triumphantly, in February 1819 CE. The Burmese reinstalled Chandrakanta Singha on the throne and after some time, bulk of their forces returned to Burma.

=== Chandrakanta quarreled with Burmese and third Burmese invasion ===
Bodawpaya died in 1819 CE, succeeded by his grandson Bagyidaw as the new king of Burma. Meanwhile, Chandrakanta Singha tried to free himself from Burmese influence, started to strengthen his army and constructed fortifications in Joypur, in order to check further invasions by Burmese in Assam. Chandrakanta's efforts to rehabilitate himself and to free himself from Burmese influence reached the ears of Bagyidaw. A fresh army was dispatched under Mingimaha Tilowa Baju on the pretext of handling over some presents to Chandrakanta Singha. The Burmese force approached the borders of Assam in March 1821, but Chandrakanta Singha got scent of the real intentions of the Burmese, and fled to Guwahati. The Burmese commander Mingimaha Tilowa Baju invited Chandrakanta Singha to return to the Capital Jorhat, but Chandrakanta refused to believe the Burmese and declined their invitation. In revenge for his mistrust, the Burmese put a great number of his followers to death. In retaliation, Chandrakanta Singha took his revenge by punishing the Burmese officers, who were sent to invite him back. The breach now became final and both sides decided to take each other head on. Receiving intelligence of Chandrakanta's military preparation against Burmese in Guwahati, the Burmese General Mingimaha Tilowa Baju marched against him, in September 1821 CE. Alarmed by the huge size of Burmese army, Chandrakanta retreated from Guwahati to British ruled Bengal.

== Accession to the throne ==
The Burmese assumed full authority over Ahom kingdom and news of Burmese triumphs in Assam was duly transmitted to Amarapura. Bagyidaw issued order to General Mingimaha Tilowa Baju in Assam to place on the throne Jogeswar, the eldest brother of Hemo Aideo, his Assamese consort inherited from his grandfather Bodawpaya along with the succession. Thus in November 1821, Burmese General Mingimaha Tilowa Baju appointed Jogeswar as the king of the Ahom kingdom in Assam, and was proclaimed Jogeswar Singha. The appointment of Jogeswar Singha was done with double purpose; it would enhance the prestige of the Assamese queen Hemo Aideo or Hemo Mepaya in the court of Burmese monarch, and would also placate the Assamese subjects who would naturally appreciate a native ruler being set up in their country. In reality, Jogeswar Singha had no vestige of any sovereign power and the Burmese general was all in all in Assam.

== Reign ==
=== Attempts by Chandrakanta Singha and Purandar Singha to dislodge Burmese invaders ===
Towards the end of the 1821 A.D, Chandrakanta Singha collected a force of about two thousand men, consisting of Sikhs and Hindustanis from British ruled Bengal and rallied his men in the Goalpara district. The Burmese troops and their followers were so numerous that it was found impossible to provide them with supplies in any one place. They were, therefore, distributed about the country in a number of small detachments. Chandrakanta Singha, seeing his opportunity, returned to the attack and, after inflicting several defeats on the Burmese, recaptured Guwahati in January 1822 CE. At the same time the Burmese forces on the north bank of the Brahmaputra were harassed by repeated incursions on the part of Purandar Singha’s troops, which had rallied in Bhutan. The Assamese villagers, especially on the north bank of Brahmaputra waged guerilla warfare against the occupying Burmese troops after obtaining help from the tribes of Akas and Dafalas, completely diminishing Burmese authority from the north bank of Brahmaputra.

The Burmese commander Mingimaha Tilowa Baju sent a long letter to the British Governor-General at Calcutta, protesting against the facilities which had been accorded to the Ahom princes and demanded their extradition, but the British authority gave no reply.

=== Arrival of Mingi Maha Bandula and Battle of Mahgarh ===
Meanwhile, news of Burmese reverses in Assam reached Burma. The Burmese monarch Bagyidaw sent his finest general Mingi Maha Bandula to reclaim Assam with reinforcements of 20,000 soldiers. Undaunted by enemy strength, Chandrakanta Singha marched upwards into Upper Assam with approximately 2000 men consisting of Sikhs and Hindustani mercenaries and some local Assamese people recruited around Guwahati. He pitched his camp in Mahgarh (presently known as Kokilamukh; located in Jorhat district near Jorhat town). On 19 April 1822 A.D. the 20,000 Burmese led by Mingi Maha Bandula and the 2000 mixed Assamese-Hindustani forces led by Chandrakanta Singha fought the decisive battle of Mahgarh. Chandrakanta Singha is said to have displayed unusual vigour and courage by himself present in the thick of battle; personally leading his soldiers; and engaged in hand-to-hand combat with enemy soldiers. For some time his troops held their own, but in the end their ammunition gave out and they were defeated with a loss of 1500 men. The Burmese won the battle due to their numerical superiority but sustained losses more than that of Chandrakanta's forces. Chandrakanta Singha and his remaining forces managed to escape back to Guwahati as the Burmese, like Chandrakanta Singha's forces run out of ammunitions and a lot of them were injured or dead after the battle. Mingi Maha Bandula sent Burmese Commander Mingimaha Tilowa Baju in pursuit of Chandrakanta Singha. Unable to resist the Burmese with his small force, Chandrakanta Singha fall back to Hadirachowki (Assam chowki), where he made preparation to resist the Burmese with his mixed levies consisting of Sikh, Hindustanis and Assamese soldiers. On 21 June 1822, Chandrakanta Singha made his final stand against Mingimaha Tilowa Baju and his Burmese forces in the battle of Hadirachowki. In the battle Chandrakanta Singha was defeated and he narrowly escaped to British ruled Goalpara district. Meanwhile, after receiving the news of Chandrakanta's defeat and threatened by growing Burmese power, Purandar Singha and his forces also retreated from Assam. The victorious Burmese assumed themselves as the undisputed Masters of Brahmaputra valley. The Burmese commander sent an insolent message to the British Officer commanding at Goalpara warning him that, if protections were afforded to Chandrakanta Singha, a Burmese army of 18,000 men, commanded by forty Rajas(kings or chiefs), would invade the British territories and arrest him wherever he might be found. The British answered this threat by the dispatch to the frontier of additional troops from Dacca, and by the intimation that any advance on the part of Burmese would be at their own peril.

=== Atrocities of Burmese ===
After the defeat of Chandrakanta Singha, Mingi Maha Bandula and his forces returned to Burma, leaving Mingimaha Tilowa Baju in charge of the administration of Assam. Meanwhile, the Burmese troops crushed all the remaining resistances of Assamese and reassert their lost authority over Brahmaputra valley. Finding no opposition from anyone, the Burmese army committed numerous acts of atrocities on common Assamese people. They rob everyone who had anything worth taking. They burnt down villages, plundered the temples, violated the chastity of women, and put large numbers of innocent persons to death. In revenge for the opposition offered to their army, the Burmese slaughtered a vast number of men, women and children. Many Assamese people fled to the hills, and to Jaintia, Cachar and British ruled Bengal, and sought refuge among neighbouring hill tribes.

=== Chandrakanta Singha imprisoned ===
Meanwhile, the Burmese tried to revive diplomatic relationship with Chandrakanta Singha. They sent messages that they never meant to injure him, and had only set up Jogeswar Singha as King because he refused to obey their summons to return. Chandrakanta Singha, frustrated by his failure to recruit troops from Goalpara and Bengal, finally accepted the Burmese proposal of reinstalling him to the throne and surrendered to the Burmese in Hadirachowki. He was taken to Jorhat where he was seized and placed in confinement at Rangpur.

=== Burmese efforts to set up proper administration ===
Meanwhile, Mingimaha Bandula reached Amarapura, and conveyed all details about Assam to Burmese monarch Bagyidaw. He complained Bagyidaw about the atrocities committed by Burmese army under Mingimaha Tilowa Baju, on Assamese people and lack of proper administration there. Bagyidaw recalled Mingimaha Tilowa Baju and appointed Mingimaha Kyaadeng Mogaton as the Governor of Assam. Mingimaha Kyaadeng Mogaton soon, brought a marked improvement in the treatment of the local Assamese people, by Burmese authorities. Rapine and pillage were put to stop, and no punishment was inflicted without cause. Following the Ahom system of Government, officers were again appointed to govern the country; a settled administration was established, and regular taxation took the place of unlimited extortion.

=== Deposed ===
After appointment of Mingimaha Kyaadeng Mogaton as the Governor in 1822 CE, the Burmese took direct control over the administrations of Assam. Some Historians stated that during this time, the Burmese deposed Jogeswar Singha and kept him in confinement at Jorhat. Some historians like S. L. Barua states that the Burmese deposed Jogeswar and declared Mingi Maha Tilowa as the Raja or king of Assam. While some historians like Surya Kumar Bhuyan and Hiteswar Barbaruah stated that Jogeswar Singha remained as titular king of Ahom kingdom till Burmese expulsion by British in 1825 CE.

== Anglo-Burmese War and British occupation of Assam ==
In 1824 A.D. the First Anglo-Burmese War broke out. The Burmese was utterly defeated and were expelled from Assam, Cachar and Manipur. In February 1825 CE, Burmese army in Assam was completely defeated. The British surrounded Rangpur the last stronghold of Burmese in Upper Assam. The Burmese commanders sent one Buddhist priest named Dharmadhar Brahmachari, a native of Ceylon, brought up in Ava, to negotiate the terms for the surrender of Rangpur. In exchange, the Burmese commander requested British commander Colonel Richards, to allow them to withdraw from Assam unmolested. The British commander Colonel Richards agreed to this proposal in order to avoid further bloodshed, allowing Burmese army to return to Burma. At that time Jogeswar Singha was residing in Jorhat, while Chandrakanta Singha was at Rangpur. The British commander fearing tension due to the presence of these two former kings, exiled Jogeswar Singha to Jogighopa in present-day Bongaigaon district, while Chandrakanta Singha was sent to Guwahati. Meanwhile, the Burmese suffered defeat in other fronts of the war. The Burmese monarch Bagyidaw sued for peace and the treaty of Yandabo was signed by both parties on 26 February 1826. According to the terms and conditions of the treaty, the Burmese monarch renounced all claims over Assam and British became the masters of the Brahmaputra valley

== Death and legacy ==
Jogeswar Singha along with his family arrived Jogighopa under British escort. Shortly after his arrival, he fell ill and died, in 1825 CE. Being a puppet in the hands of the Burmese, Jogeswar Singha was unable to exercise any authority, during his reign. People use to refer him as “Maane pota Raja”, means king installed by Burmese. His reign was marked by the atrocities committed by Burmese on Assamese, and the people recalled those days with terror as “Maanor Din”, literally the days of Burmese(Assamese refer Burmese as Myan or Maan).

== Family and descendants ==
Jogeswar Singha left a son named Dambarudhar Singha Juvraj, and a daughter named Padmavati. Local inhabitants used to call Dambarudhar Singha Jubraj as Bolia Raja or the mad king. The British Government granted him pension of mere 50 rupees per month. Later British government appointed Dambarudhar's son Krishnaram Singha Jubraj as Mouzadar in Moriani located in Titabor, in Jorhat district. Because of this appointment, Krishnaram Singha Jubraj was known among the local inhabitants as Raja Mouzadar. The descendants of Krishnaram continued to live in Holongpar. Jogeswar Singha's brother Bihuram alias Biswanath, who accompanied his sister Hemo Aideo to Burma, became the governor of Mogaung and ultimately a chief minister of the Burmese Monarch. His youngest brother Dhaniram also sought refuge in Burma together with his mother. Biswanath and Dhaniram were known as Tabangacha and Malomin in Burmese records. Biswanath or Tabangacha had five sons, Maung Gyi, Maung Mitha, Maung Lat, Maung Gale and Maung Son, all of whom rose to prominence and power. Of his three daughters Medaya Mapaya became the consort of Burmese King Mindon Min (1853-78 CE). Malomin alias Dhaniram ordinarily resided at the Capital with his mother and sister Hemo Aideo. Jogeswar Singha's sisters Taravati Aideo and Surupahi Aideo was granted a pension of 120 rupees per year from 1850 CE and 1852 CE.

== See also ==
- Ahom dynasty
- Ahom kingdom
- Bagyidaw
- Bodawpaya
- British East India Company
- Burmese invasion of Assam
- First Anglo-Burmese War
- Timeline of Jorhat

== Bibliography ==
- Bhuyan Dr. S.K. Swargadeo Rajeswar Singha first edition 1975 Publication Board of Assam Guwahati
- Bhuyan Dr. S.K. Tunkhungia Buranji or A History of Assam (1681-1826) second edition 1968 Department of HISTORICAL AND ANTIQUARIAN STUDIES IN ASSAM Guwahati
- Barbaruah Hiteswar Ahomar-Din or A History of Assam under the Ahoms first edition 1981 Publication Board of Assam Guwahati
- Barua Gunaviram Assam Buranji or A History of Assam fourth edition 2008 Publication Board of Assam Guwahati
- Gait E.A. A History of Assam second edition 1926 Thacker, Spink & Co Calcutta
- Chaliha Sadananda Guwahati: Buranjir Khala-Bamat or A collection of select articles on the antiquity and history of Guwahati and the surrounding tracts first edition 1991 M/s Student Stores Guwahati
