= Ahom Raja's Palace =

Historic building in Assam, India

Ahom Raja's palace is an historic building in Garhgaon, Assam State, India.

The four-story palace has a dome shaped roof and also contains a chamber. Two of the four original watchtowers survive. The palace contains three halls on the ground floor that face west.

== History ==
Garhgaon was the home of the Ahom dynasty. The palace was built by king Rajeswar Singha in 1752 CE.
