= Sutyinpha =

Ahom king from 1644 to 1648

- Chaopha Swargadeo of Ahom Kingdom

Ahom King
- Reign: 1644–1648
- Predecessor: Suramphaa
- Successor: Sutamla
- Born: Ahom kingdom
- Died: c. 1648; Ahom kingdom
- Issue: Sutamla
- Dynasty: Ahom dynasty
- Father: Susenghphaa
- Religion: Ahom religion; Hinduism

Sutyinpha (died 1648) or Sutingpha was the Ahom king from 1644 to 1648. He was sickly and had scoliosis, and thus was also known as noriya roja and kekura roja. He was often unable to attend to public duties and had to be carried in a palanquin.

== Ascension ==
Sutyinpha became the king after his brother, the erstwhile king, was deposed. He got in palace intrigues and was eventually deposed himself by his son Sutamla and killed.
