= Jambor Gohain, Charing Raja =

Ahom Prince and claimant to the throne

Jambor Gohain
- Charing Raja
- Issue: Sriram Gohain
- House: Tungkhungia
- Dynasty: Ahom
- Father: Gobar Roja

Jambor Gohain, Charing Raja was an Ahom Prince and claimant to the Ahom throne. A member of the Ahom dynasty and its cadet branch the Tungkhungia line, he was the son of King Gobar Roja.

In 1697, Jambor unsuccessfully plotted to assassinate his nephew King Rudra Singha, and take the throne for himself. He was subsequently arrested, mutilated by having his kneecaps extracted, and exiled to Namrup. His descendant, Jogeswar Singha, became one of the final Ahom Kings.

== Ancestry ==
Jambor Gohain was the son of King Gobar Roja, of the Ahom dynasty and its cadet branch the Tungkhungia line. His siblings were Bauli Gabharu and King Gadadhar Singha.

== Rebellion against Rudra Singha ==
=== Conspiracy ===
In the month of Bhadra (August–September), Gohain rebelled against his nephew, King Rudra Singha, soon after Rudra became King. He conspired with several men from Tingkhang. The Sungi Barua, who lived near Changtak, was also implicated in the conspiracy.

Rudra Singha was at Charaideo Hill performing religious worship. The conspirators intended to assassinate him on his return journey to the capital, after he had finished watching hawk-fights.

=== Aftermath ===
A man of the Dom (fishing community), who looked after the ducks of Jambor, informed Rudra Singha of the assassination plot just as the King was preparing to depart. After the King returned, he ordered the arrest of Jambor along with the Sungi Barua. Both were captured and arrested, and the Sungi Barua was executed at Namrup.

=== Mutilation and exile ===
After Rudra Singha had returned, Jambor was mutilated by having his kneecaps extracted, and was subsequently exiled to Namrup.

== Issue and descendants ==
Jambor’s issue included Sriram Gohain, who was the ancestor of King Jogeswar Singha. He was also an ancestor of Hemo Aideau, the wife of Bodawpaya, and Medaya Mepaya the wife of Mindon Min.

- Jambor Gohain
  - Sriram Gohain
    - Langal Gohain
      - Pirika Gohain
        - Baga Konwar, Tipam Raja
          - Taravati Aideau
          - Sarupahi Aideau
          - Jogeswar Singha
          - Mantan Gohain, Charing Raja
          - Biswanath Gohain, Tipam Raja
            - Maung Gyi
            - Maung Mitha
            - Maung Lat
            - Maung Gale
            - Maung Son
            - Medaya Mepaya (Queen of Mindon Min)
          - Hemo Aideau (Queen of Bodawpaya)
          - Dhaniram Gohain
        - Bhagi Gohain
        - Bhog Gohain
      - Padmanath Gohain
