= Jayadhwaj Singha =

Ahom King (died 1663)

- Chaopha; Swargadeo
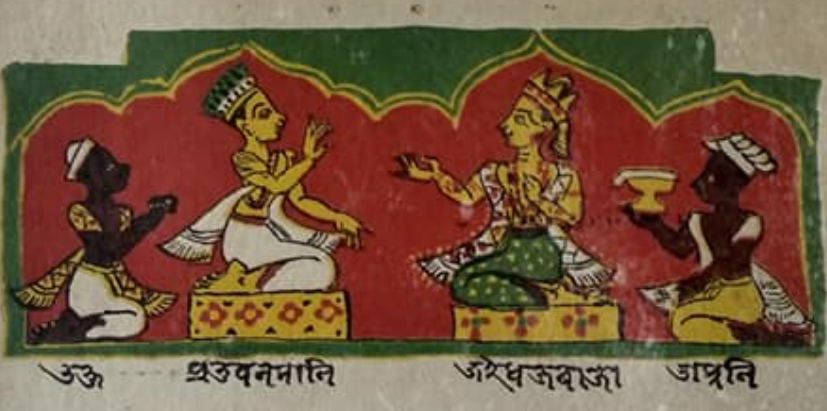
- Jayadhwaj Singha (right) along his spiritual preceptor Banamalidev (left). Painting from Banamali Devar Charit c. 17th century.

Ahom King
- Reign: April 1648 – 16 November 1663
- Coronation: April 1648
- Predecessor: Sutingpha
- Successor: Chakradhwaj Singha
- Born: Chao-Sham
- Died: 16 November 1663; Bakata, Ahom kingdom
- Consort: Kusumi Bar Kunwari
- Junior consorts: Pakhari Gabharu elder daughter of Khamun Phukan
- Issue: Ramani Gabharu
Names
- Bhagania Roja Jayadhwaj Singha
- Dynasty: Ahom dynasty
- Father: Sutingpha
- Religion: Hinduism

Jayadhwaj Singha (born Chao-Sham; died 16 November 1663), also known as Sutamla, was Ahom King from 1648 until his death in 1663.

During his reign the Mughal viceroy at Bengal Mir Jumla II invaded and occupied his capital Garhgaon as a result of which he had to retreat to the Namrup area, and because of this flight he is also known as the Bhagania Roja in the Buranjis. In the days of Jayadhwaj Singha Auniati Satra and Dakhinpat Satra was established. He formally accepted the initiation of Niranjan Bapu and settled him as the Satradhikar (head of Vaisnava religious institution) in the Auniati Satra. He exempted disciples of satra from personal labour to the state.

== Ancestry ==
Jayadhwaj Singha was the son of Ahom King Sutingpha. His maternal uncle was Lecham Burhagohain of the Kuoigayan family.

== Reign ==
=== Accession ===
King Sutingphaa, was deposed by the Burhagohain. Prince Chao-Sham ascended the throne, taking the Hindu name Jayadhwaj Singha and Tai name Sutamla. His Singarigharutha took place in April 1648.

=== Mir Jumla's invasion ===
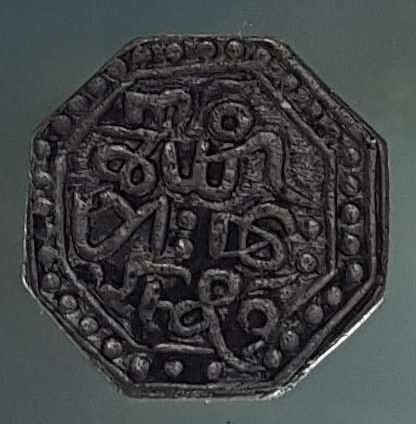
Coin of Jayadhwaj Singha in Ahom script.

After the Mughal emperor Shah Jahan fell sick in 1658, the vassal ruler of Koch Bihar, Pran Narayan, threw off the Mughal yoke and took possession of Kamrup and Hajo. The Ahoms, taking advantage of the confusion, pushed west and took control of the region up to the Sankosh river. Mir Jumla II, Aurangzeb's general who pursued Prince Shuja to the Arakan, was made the governor of Bengal. Very soon he repossessed Koch Bihar and began his campaign against the Ahom kingdom on January 4, 1662. The Ahoms took a stand at the Jogighopa fort at the Manas river. Mir Jumla overran Jogighopa, Guwahati, Simlagarh, Salagarh and finally Sutamla's capital Garhgaon on March 17, which the Ahom king had abandoned for Namrup.

Early onset of monsoon that year made it difficult for Mir Jumla to transfer the voluminous booty that fell into his hands following his capture of Garhgaon. Atan Burhagohain, who was left behind as rearguard, began harassing the Mughal with guerrilla tactics, and Mir Jumla had to fall back to Garhgaon and Mathurapur, with the Ahoms taking back possession of the rest of the kingdom. Sutamla came down from Namrup and camped at Solaguri. After that Swargadeo Jayadhwaj Singha had to sign Treaty of Ghilajharighat. According to this treaty Swargadeo Jayadhwaj Singha sent his daughter Ramani Gabharu to the Mughal empire.

== Family ==
=== Consorts ===
Jayadhwaj Singha's Bar Kunwari (Chief Consort) was Kusumi, the younger daughter of Khamun Phukan. His Parvatia Kunwari was an elder sister of Kusumi, and daughter of Khamun Phukan, who was firstly married to a member of the Burhagohain family, but the King took her from her husband and married her instead. She had one son from her previous husband, Langichang Gohain, known as Kalia Gohain, who was adopted by the King.

Pakhari Gabharu was a Tamuli Kunwari (Junior Consort) of the King, and they were the parents of Ramani Gabharu.

== Death ==
Jayadhwaj Singha is said to have had a great desire to looked at the ruined capital of Garhgaon, and became distraught with grief after seeing its condition. He returned to his Bakata camp, and fell ill with severe diabetes. After an illness of nine days, Jayadhwaj Singha died on 16 November 1663.

On his deathbed, he implored his ministers and nobles to protect the people, saying that "it should be your earnest endeavour to extract from the nation's bosom the spear of humiliation fixed upon it by our enemy the Mogul."
