= Pakhari Gabharu =

Ahom royal consort (died 1675)

- Born: Ahom kingdom
- Died: April 1675; Ahom kingdom
- Spouses: Jayadhwaj Singha (died 1663); Chakradhwaj Singha (died 1670) Suhung (m. 1674; died 1675)
- Issue: Ramani Gabharu; Sem Gabharu
Names
- Pakhari Gabharu
- Dynasty: Ahom (by marriage)
- Father: Momai Tamuli Borbarua

Pakhari Gabharu (died April 1675) was an Ahom royal consort. She was the wife of three Kings: Jayadhwaj Singha, Chakradhwaj Singha, and Suhung.

She was the daughter of legendary Ahom General Momai Tamuli Borbarua and mother of Ramani Gabharu, wife of Mughal Emperor Muhammad Azam Shah.

Gabharu was assassinated by Debera Borbarua, after she plotted with King Suhung, Simaluguria Naobaicha Phukan and Laitai Deodha, to murder Debera.

== Family background ==
Gabharu was the daughter of legendary Ahom General Momai Tamuli Borbarua. She was the sister of famous Ahom general Lachit Borphukan and statesman Laluksola Borphukan.

== Ahom consort ==
=== Jayadhwaj Singha ===
Gabharu became a junior consort of Ahom King Jayadhwaj Singha. Their daughter Ramani Gabharu was sent to the Mughal Empire as part of the Treaty of Ghilajharighat at the age of seven and was renamed Rahmat Banu Begum after married by Muhammad Azam Shah.

=== Chakradhwaj Singha ===
After the death of Jayadhwaj Singha, Gabharu became the Bar Kunwari (Chief Consort) of the next Ahom King, Chakradhwaj Singha.

Gabharu taunted King Chakradhwaj for having once seen him flirt with a maid, and she was consequently demoted to a junior queen.

=== Suhung ===
After the death of Chakradhwaj Singha, Gabharu was placed as the chief consort of the King Suhung in 1674, by Debera Borbarua. She was placed in the inner apartments of Suhung to act as an informant for Debera, and she was specially instructed by Debera to educate the King on the formalities and manners of the office.

Debera oversaw the massacre of various officials and those opposed him, which was noticed by Gabharu. She then suggested to the King that he was being made powerless and essentially a figurehead in comparison to the authority of Debera. Suhung, along with Gabharu, Simaluguria Naobaicha Phukan and Laitai Deodha, subsequently decided to assassinate Debera.

Debera was alerted of their plan, and he then poisoned King Suhung. He then said to Gabharu "you were formerly a Tamuli Kuanri (junior consort) of Jayadhwaj Singha, and I have elevated you to the rank of the Barkuanri of the Samaguria Raja. Now you have plotted with your husband to kill me! So please accompany your husband to enjoy eternal sovereignty with him!"

Gabharu was put to death towards the end of April 1675, and her body was placed in the grave of her first husband, Jayadhwaj Singha.
