= Moidam =

Tumuli of the Ahom Kingdom

UNESCO World Heritage Site
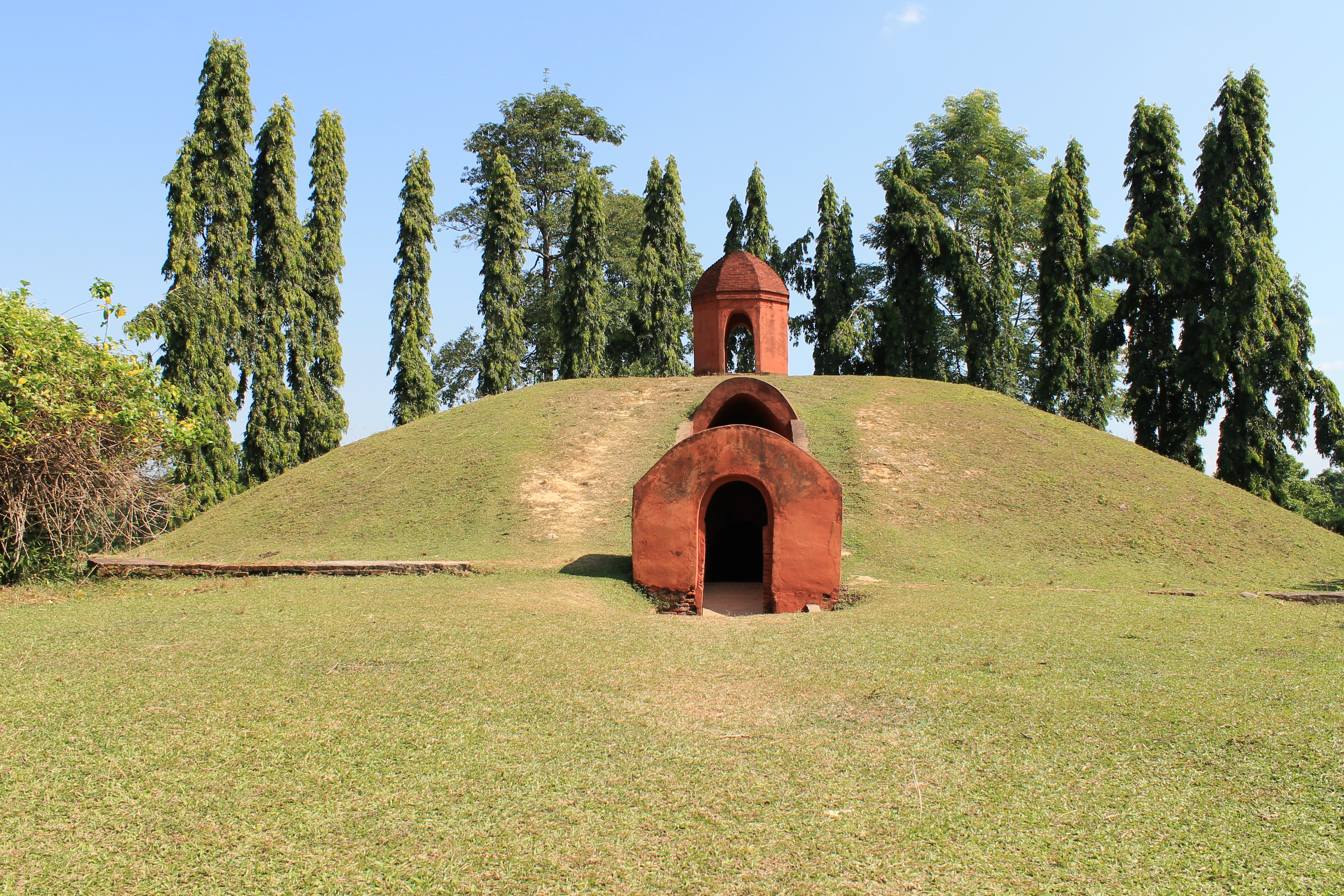
- Royal maidam at Charaideo, 2009
- Interactive map of Moidam
- Official name: Moidams – the Mound-Burial System of the Ahom Dynasty
- Location: Assam
- Criteria: Cultural: (iii) (iv)
- Reference: 1711
- Inscription: 2024 (46th Session)

Frang-Mai-Dam or Moidam for short (Ahom:𑜉𑜩𑜓𑜝𑜪; meaning: Burial of the dead) is a traditional tumulus of the Ahom religion. The royal maidams of Charaideo are listed as UNESCO world heritage site. Today, the people of the four clans namely Mo-Hung, Mo-Cham, Chaodang and Mo-Plong follow the tomb tradition of Ahom religion.

Structurally, a maidam consists of vaults with one or more chambers. The vaults have a domical superstructure that is covered by a hemispherical earthen mound that rises high above the ground with an open pavilion at the peak called chow chali. An octagonal dwarf wall encloses the entire maidam.

Burial is the predominant funeral rite of the Tai people, to which the Ahom people originally belonged. This is opposed to the Hindu system of cremation. After the Ahom kings adopted Hinduism, they chose to bury the ashes in mounds after cremation.

The Ahom community in Assam consider the excavation as an affront to their tradition, because the maidams are associated with the Ahom ancestor worship and the festival of Me-Dam-Me-Phi.

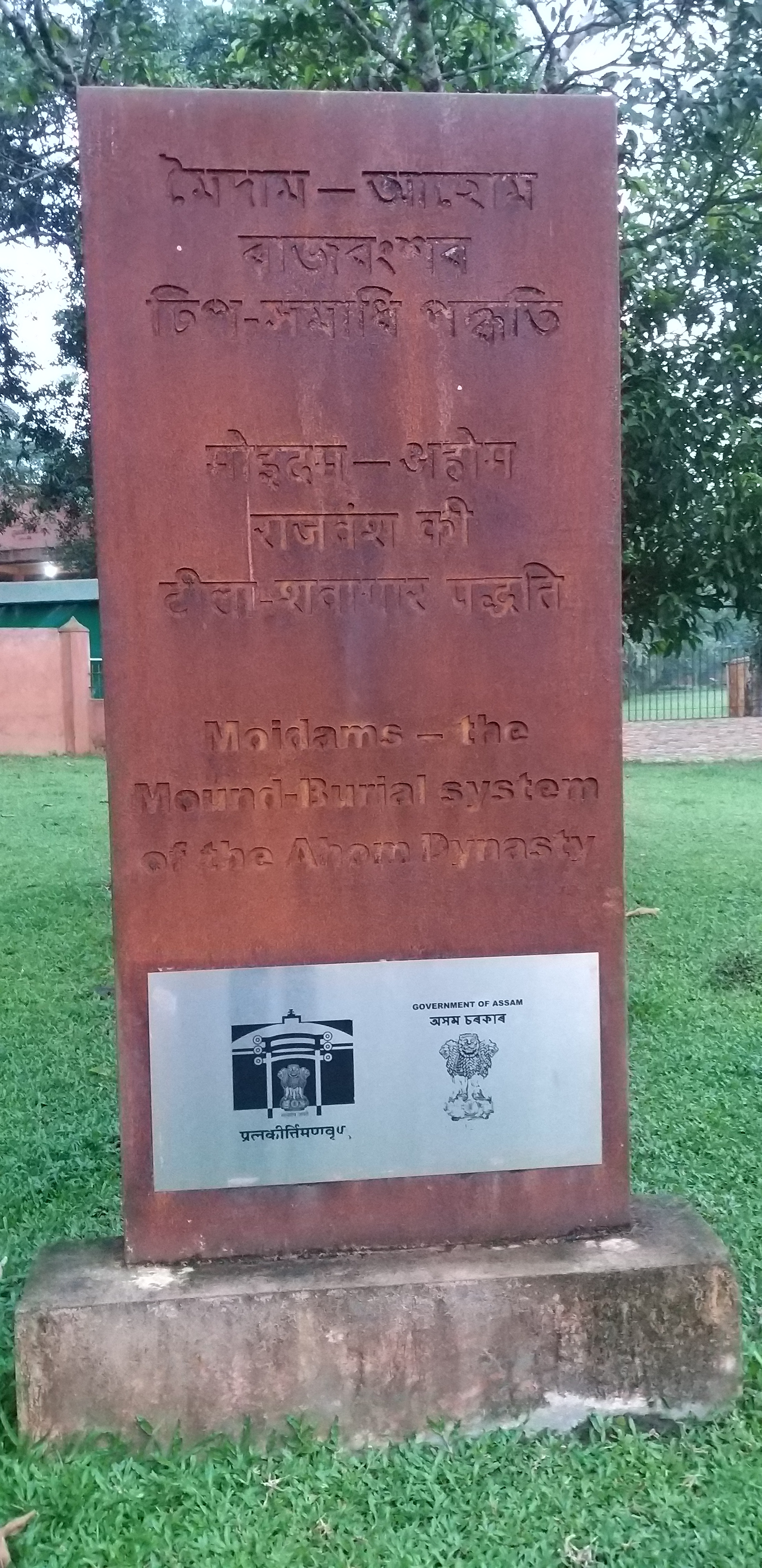
Charaideo Maidams - UNESCO World Heritage Site, Assam

== Etymology ==
The word Moidam is shorter form of Tai-Ahom word Phrang-Mai-Dam. Phrang-Mai means to bury and Dam means dead ones or Ancestral Spirit.

== Maidams ==
Inside the Maidams there are underground vaults or chambers for different purposes, one for keeping the body of the departed king with all the necessary things for afterlife, and others for the servants, care-takers, horses, and elephants. The present height of Maidams is reduced due to various natural calamities. In earlier times at least 10 living persons were buried alive with the departed king to take care of him in afterlife, however this custom was abolished by Rudra Singha.

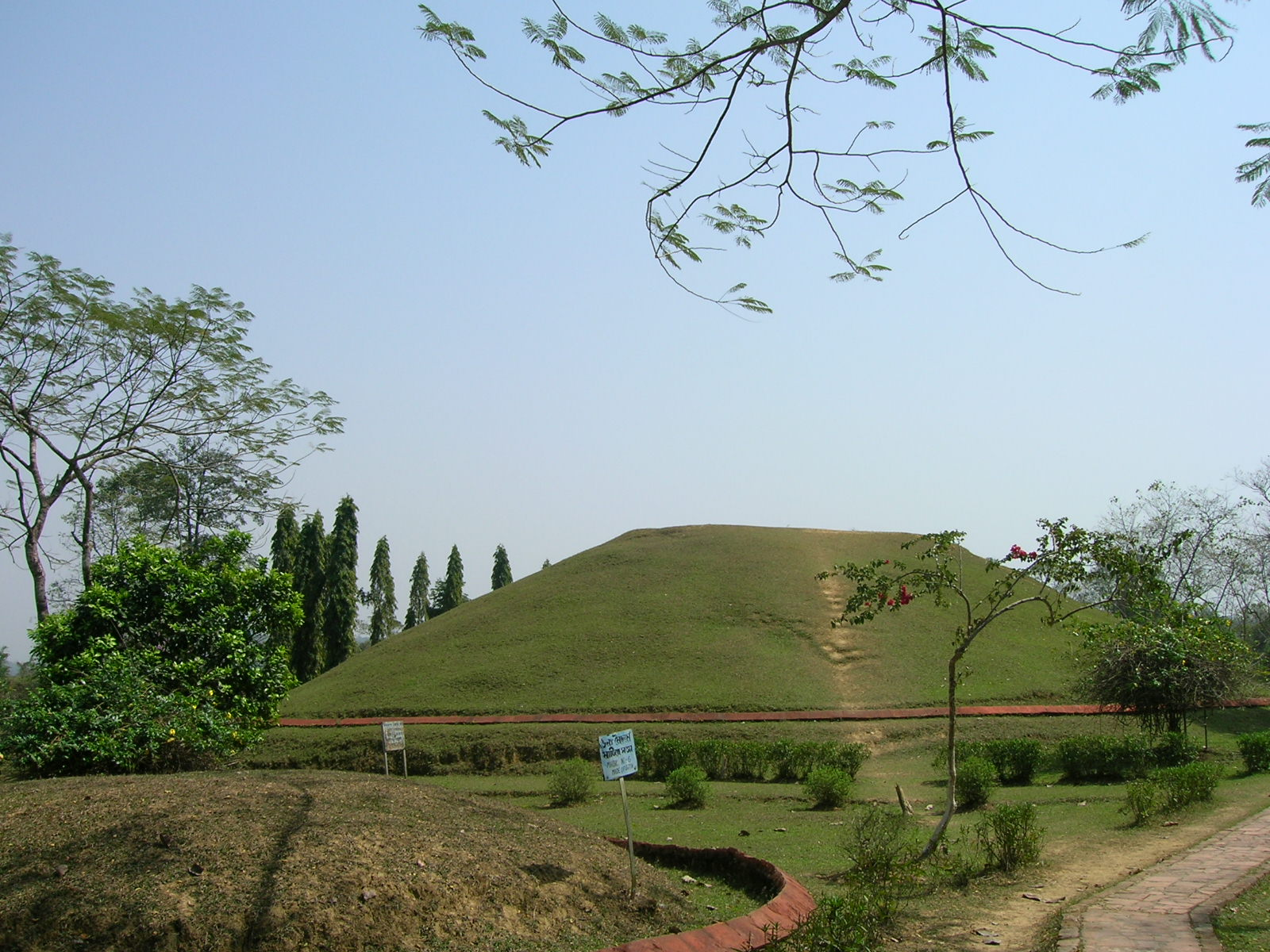
Maidam no 1, unidentified maidam of an Ahom king, 265 meter in diameter

Height of the Maidams depended on the power of the kings, most of the Maidams were not designated by the name of kings, so most remain unidentified, except the Maidams of Gadadhar Singha and Rudra Singha. Most of the big Maidams belongs from the late 17th century and 18th century, earlier most of the Maidam chambers were built using solid wood poles and beams, it got replaced with bricks and stones since Gadadhar Singha and his successors. As a custom only the people of Gharphaliya and Lakhurakhan clans were permitted to bury the dead bodies of Kings and queens. There was a specified officer called Chang-Rung Phukan responsible for construction of Maidams. Chang-Rung Phukan was also the Chief-architect of Ahom kingdom. Officers called Maidam Phukans and guards called Maidamiya were appointed to protect and maintain the Maidams.

The structural construction and the process of royal burials are explained in historical documents called Chang-Rung Phukanor Buranji, which detail even the articles that were buried. Later excavations under the Archaeological Survey of India found some of the maidams previously defiled, with the articles mentioned in the Buranji missing. Many of the maidams were excavated and looted, most famously under the Mughal general Mir Jumla who had occupied Garhgaon briefly in the 17th century, and by the British after 1826.

In the past, when any king or a warrior died in a battle, their severed heads were brought and buried here. When the Chutia kingdom fell to the Ahoms in 1524, the heads of the Chutia king and his son were also buried in the tomb of Charaideo.

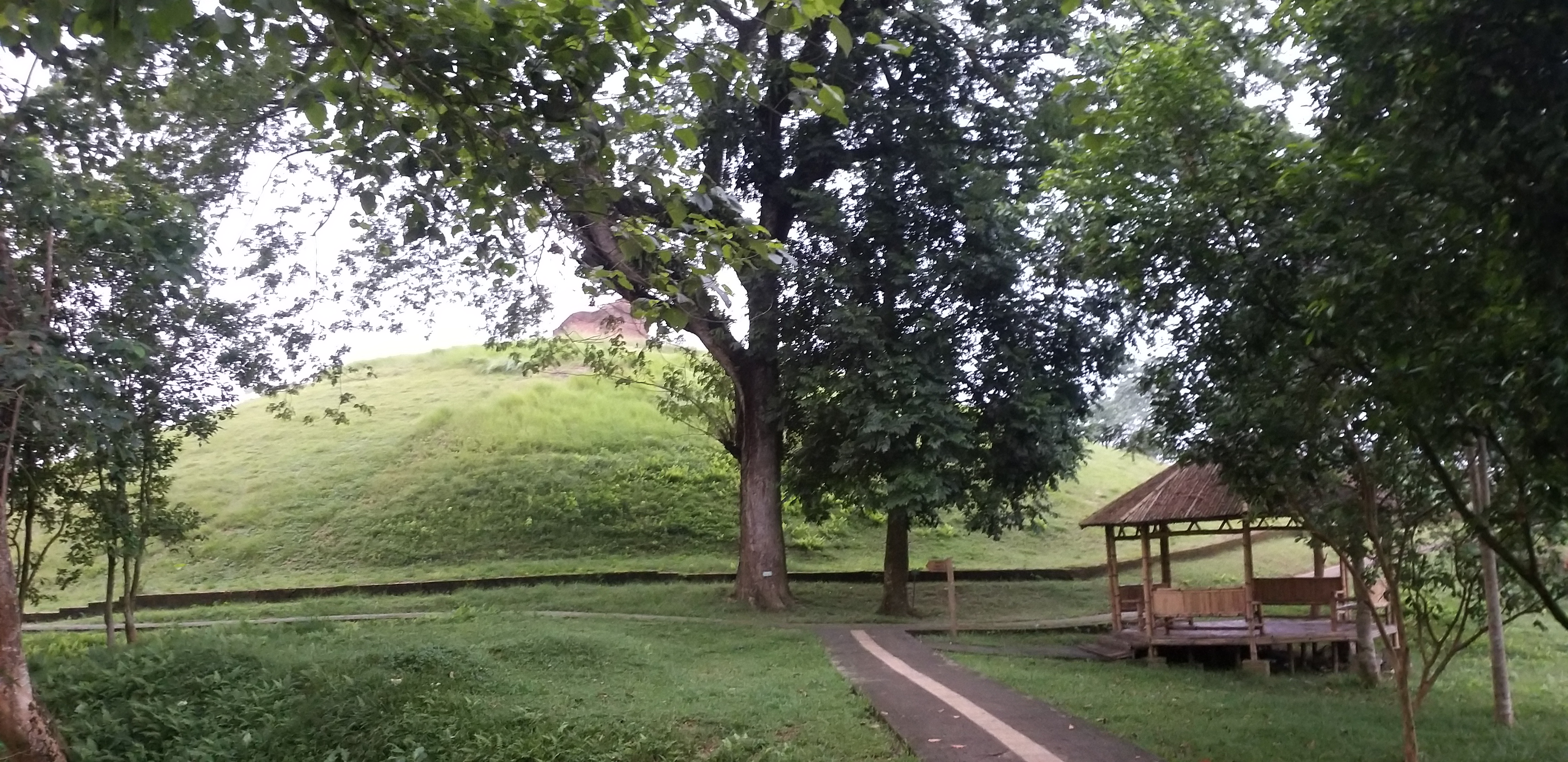
Charaideo Maidams, Assam

== Excavation ==
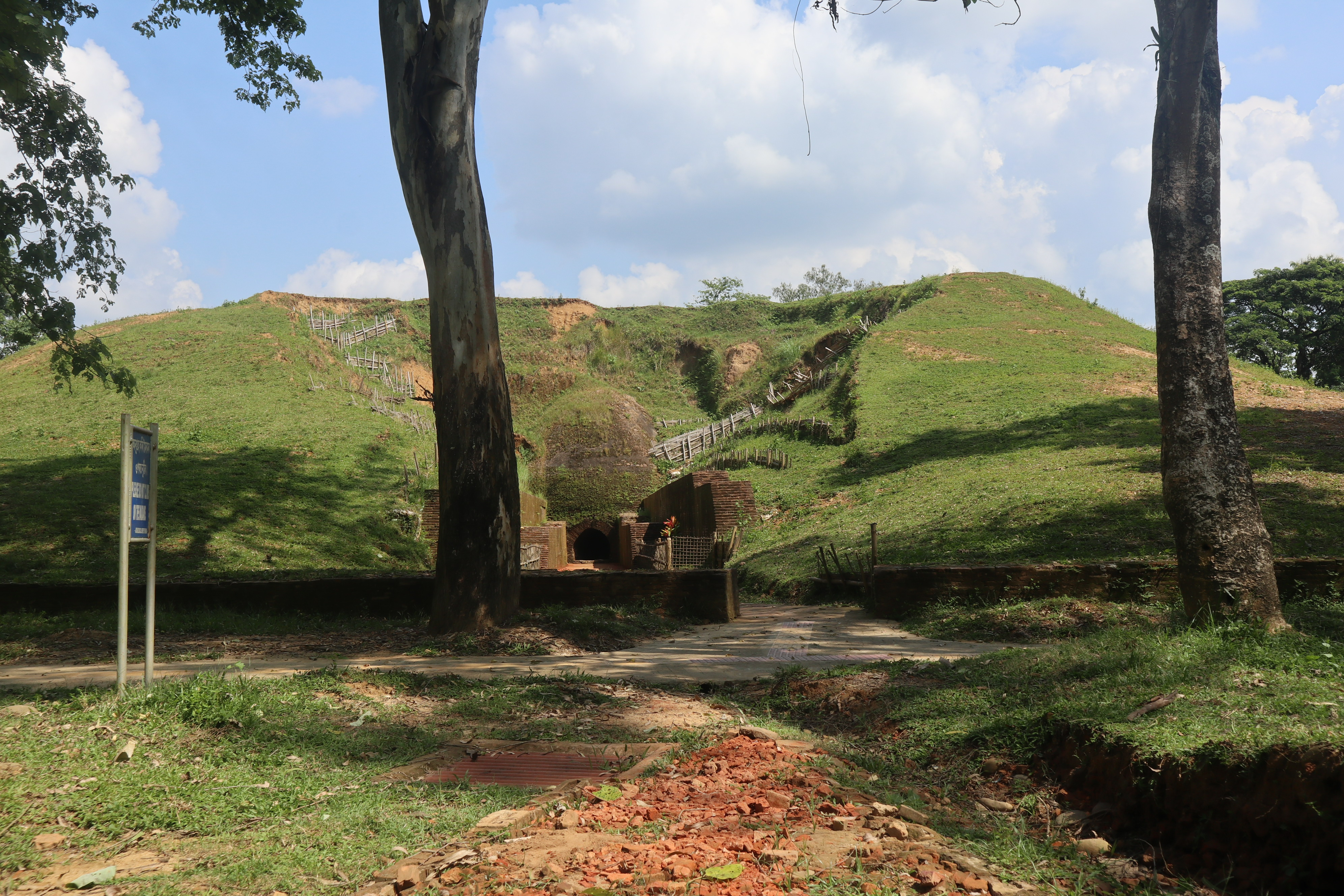
Maidam No.2 excavated between 2000 and 2002, it can either be said as the Maidam of Pramatta Singha or Rajeswar Singha according to the dating.

Being famous for its vault treasure Maidams also attracted many plunderers from Mughals, British to even local people, who have plundered the maidams multiple times. The earliest sketch of Maidam was made by 1848 by Serjeant C.Clayton who superintendent an excavation of a Maidam in the 1840s.

In 2000–02, Archaeological Survey of India, Guwahati circle excavated Maidam No. 2. It retained the characteristics of a full-fledged Maidam. The Maidam vault and covering earthen mound was made out of burned bricks, and encircled by an octagonal boundary wall. There was a hole at the roof of the Maidam indicating it was robbed earlier. The arched-shaped door of the maidam was found on the western side after it was excavated, which was originally covered with bricks and stone masonry. Though already robbed it still yielded several artefacts including skeleton remains of 5 individuals, ivory decorative pieces, several pieces of wooden objects (including a Xorai designed at the shape of a pillar), an ivory panel depicting royal Ahom insignia, carvings of elephants, peacock and floral motifs etc. The exact dating of this Maidam couldn't be done, but it is estimated at the first half of the 18th century.
