= Ramadhwaj Singha =

Ahom king from 1672 to 1674

Suklamphaa
- Chaopha Swargadeo of Ahom Kingdom

Ahom King
- Reign: 1672 – November 1674
- Predecessor: Sunyatphaa
- Successor: Suhung
- Born: Sarugohain; Ahom kingdom
- Died: November 1674; Ahom kingdom
- Consort: daughter of Chapara khowa Gohain
- Issue: Ladam
Names
- Swargadeo Ramdhwaj Singha
- House: Charingia
- Dynasty: Ahom dynasty
- Father: Namrupia Raja
- Religion: Ahom religion Hinduism

Ramadhwaj Singha (born Sarugohain; died November 1674), also known as Suklampha, was Ahom King from 1672 until his assassination in 1674.

His reign is known for the rise in power of Debera Borbarua and the beginning of a ten-year period of power struggles among high officials of the kingdom that saw quick changes in kings via court intrigues and internal armed conflicts.

== Ancestry ==
Ramdhwaj Singha was the grandson of Sureng Deo Raja, son of Ahom king Suhungmung. His grandfather Sureng Deo Raja was the founder of the Charingia branch of Royal Ahom Dynasty. Sureng Deo Raja was a valliant warrior, who fought many battles in military expedition against Chutia Kingdom and Kachari kingdom during the reign of his father Suhungmung. He also fought against the invading forces of Koch kingdom led by Chilarai during the reign of his elder brother Suklenmung and his nephew Sukhampha. The early name of Ramdhwaj Singha was Sarugohain. Both of his elder brothers, Chakradhwaj Singha and Udayaditya Singha ascended the throne and successively became kings of Ahom kingdom

== Deposition of Udayaditya Singha ==
Udayaditya Singha became a disciple of Paramananda Sannyasi, an ascetic who hailed of Gokulpur in Vrindaban. In his eagerness to enhance the prestige of his guru, the king ordered all his nobles and the twelve Vaishnava Mahantas or Monks of Thakuria denomination to become disciples of Paramananda Sannyasi. The nobles complied but the twelve Vaishnava Mahantas refused and were imprisoned. The imprisonment angered many including members of the Ahom nobility. Debera Hazarika, an Ahom officer of Lukhurakhun clan organized a plot to overthrow the reigning monarch Udayaditya Singha and place his brother Sarugohain on the throne instead. Accordingly, he gathered the support of the three Dangarias, the Burhagohain, the Borgohain and the Borpatrogohain, and broached the proposal to Sarugohain who readily accepted the offer. The prince gave vent to his resentment on the conduct of Udayaditya Singha, "The Bairagi has become to my brother, not a mere hermit, but an object of extreme veneration, the Saheb of his head. The Dangarias have also accepted initiation from the Bairagi, and the twelve Mahantas have been summoned. Justice cannot tolerate this impious situation." Sarugohain and Debera collected around a thousand men and in November, 1672, they attacked the royal palace at mid-night. After overpowering the royal guards, Udayaditya Singha was seized while his supporters, including Paramananda Sannyasi, were tortured and later killed. Sarugohain entered in the Royal audience-chamber and declared himself the sovereign of Ahom Kingdom. On the following day Udayaditya Singha was placed on a sedan and led to Charaideo Hill. His mother beseeched Sarugohain to spare the life of Udayaditya, or kill her along with the deposed monarch. Sarugohain consoled his mother saying that he and his brother would exercise joint domination, he from his headquarters at Garhgaon and Udayaditya from his capital Charaideo. Udayaditya was instead put to death soon after his arrival at Charaideo. Before he died he had put a handful of rice in his mouth and said, "An innocent is being killed! O, Great God, may retribution descend on him who is committing this crime!" The three wives of Udayaditya were also put to death.

== Accession to the throne ==
In November 1672 CE, Sarugohain formally ascended the throne. He assumed the Hindu name Swargadeo Ramdhwaj Singha while the Tai-Ahom priest conferred upon him the title Suklampha. The new king tried to ease his conscience by instituting expiatory measures in atonement for the sin of fratricide. He appointed Brahmans to perform sacrificial rites at Galporaghat on which occasion he liberally distributed largesses to the priest and astrologers. He also assembled the Vaishnava devotees and arranged for religious music and recital which continued uninterrupted for seven days and nights.

== Reign ==
=== Execution of Borgohain and Charing Raja and appointment of Debera as Borbarua ===
Debera Hazarika, the ring leader of the coup which ousted Udayaditya Singha, was dissatisfied with his position, as he felt that all others got the benefits of the new regime but him. He desired the post of Borbarua in which Ramdhwaj Singha had already appointed his trusted follower Ghorakonwar Borbarua. Therefore, Debera decided to use trick and conspiracy to achieve his desired objective. During a visit to the Ahom shrine at Charaideo, Debera informed the king that the Charing Raja, the younger brother of Ramdhwaj Singha, and Langichang Borgohain had taken possession of the Palace at Garhgaon. The king dispatched a messenger on horseback to ascertain the truth of the report, and himself hurried back and took shelter at Kathalbari fort. The messenger returned with the information that all was quite at Garhgaon. Debera explained away the discrepancy by saying that a horse had been sent by the Borgohain to the Charing Raja, but the prince did not come, for which reason the plan to storm the palace at Garhgaon had to be abandoned. Debera then produced some false witnesses to support the allegation of conspiracy against Borgohain and Charing Raja. Without further enquiry, Ramdhwaj Singha sent emissaries to the residences of both Langichang Borgohain and Charing Raja, with orders to put them to death. Both Borgohain and Charing Raja were executed without any formal trial. Debera then accused Ghorakonwar Borbarua of being party to the conspiracy and produced evidence in support; with the result that Ghorakonwar Borbarua was removed from his office and sent home. Debera Hazarika then was appointed as the Borbarua and his nephew Chengmung Gohain, son of Nakjoi Dulia Barua, was appointed Borgohain.

=== Expedition against the Chutias and Mishmis ===
The Chutias, in collaboration with the hill tribes of Abors and Mishmis, rose against the authority of the Ahom king in Sadiya. Though the revolt started during the reign of Udayaditya Singha, it took a serious turn during the reign of Ramdhwaj Singha. The king ordered Debera Borbarua to send an expedition to quell the rebellion. A force was sent against the rebels in Sadiya, and the rebels were quickly defeated. Many of their males were deported, and a yearly tribute of boats was exacted. There was also trouble with the Mishmis, who had made a raid in Ahom territory. They surrounded a small detachment of 100 men which was sent against them, but submitted on the arrival of a stronger force under the Borphukan, and gave up the men responsible for the raid.

=== Illness of Ramdhwaj and the Issue of succession ===
In 1674 CE, Ramdhwaj Singha fell ill being seized with an attack of dropsy. Debera Borbarua was at Gajpur supervising the arrangements for the consecration ceremony of the Narwa Thakur's monastery which the king had intended to attend. Hearing about the illness of the king, Debera quickly returned to the capital Garhgaon and then employed expert physicians for the treatment of the king. At that time, most of the prominent nobles, which include Atan Burhagohain and Laluk Sola Borphukan were stationed at Guwahati in order to repel possible Mughal attack from Bengal. Therefore, apart from Debera Borbarua, the remaining officers at Garhgaon were of junior ranks, allowing Debera Borbarua to exercise full authority in the Capital. Ramdhwaj Singha's growing illness compelled him to summon all the nobles present in the Capital to make arrangements for a peaceful succession in the event of his sudden demise. He suggested the names of Kalia Gohain, the son of Udayaditya Singha, and his two younger brothers Narayan Gohain Tipam Raja and Ban Gohain Namrupia Raja as his intended successors. Some proposed his son by his chief queen, Ladam. The nobles expressed their willingness to abide by the recommendations of Ramdhwaj Singha. But after coming out of the royal presence, Debera Borbarua decided to oppose the elevation of all the three intended successors of the king as they might prove to be hostile towards him in future. On the other hands, the remaining nobles decided to implement the king's proposal by placing on the throne his first nominee Kalia Gohain. Debera therefore decided to launch offensive against these officers. He summoned to the king's chamber all the Phukans and Hazarikas on the pretext of a serious turn to the monarch's illness, and he killed one by one during the course of one single night, twenty-four Hazarikas and all the Phukans of the Capital Garhgaon. The king came out of the bed, leaning on the person of his senior consort, and asked Debera about what was happening. Debera justified the massacre of the Phukans and Hazarikas by pointing out that they were all enemies of the king, and that he should not therefore feel aggrieved.

=== Dispute between Ramdhwaj and Debera ===
The high handed actions of Debera Borbarua were too much for Ramdhwaj Singha to bear. The king called Tangachu Phukan ( he was also known as Narayan Khanikar Phukan ) and asked him to finish Debera once for all, in return the king promised to elevate Tangasu Phukan to the post of Borphukan. Debera received this intelligence from one of the palace maid, whom Debera had honoured with gifts and presents. Tangasu Phukan and his two brothers namely, the Charingia Phukan and the Tipamia Phukan, visited Debera's residence with swords concealed in rolls of mats, and asked Debera to listen to a message from the king. As the Phukans approached Debera he attacked them with his sword and killed them on the spot. Debera then asked his attendants, to kill all the officers who stood against him. Ramdhwaj Singha came out of his bed chamber and heard about the failure in executing Debera and the following massacre of the officers in Garhgaon. He then returned to his bed with the consternation and grief, aggravated by the consciousness of his inability to deal appropriately with the arch-fiend Debera.

== Death ==
Debera could visualize the consequences of the king's eventual recovery from his present physical prostration. Debera directed Saona Tamuli to ask Kharmaju Bez, a physician attending the sick monarch, to mix poison with the medicine to be administered to the patient. With no alternative left, Kharmaju was forced to obey the wish of Debera Borbarua, and the next dose of medicine brought the mortal years of Swargadeo Ramdhwaj Singha to an end. The event took place in November 1674, three days after the second massacre of the officials of Garhgaon. Ramdhwaj Singha's Chief Queen, the one who always advised the monarch against Debera Borbarua, daughter of Chapara khowa Gohain was buried alive with her deceased husband.

== Legacy ==
Swargadeo Ramdhwaj Singha was a disciple of the Narwa Thakur and therefore he made every attempt to enhance his Guru's power and prestige, and became instrumental in obtaining more disciples for the Mahanta. A monastery was constructed for the Narwa Thakur at Gajpur under the order of Swargadeo Ramdhwaj Singha. The reign of Ramdhwaj Singha ushered the age of ministerial supremacy, during which the ministers hold the actual power behind the throne and kings became mere puppet in their hands. The instability and power struggle between various factions of Ahom nobles further destabilize the country and people of both high and low suffered from lack of security and peace. Even though Ramdhwaj tried to reassert his authority by planning to kill Debera Borbarua, his witty minister not only escapes the assassination bid but committed massacre of Ahom officials in Garhgaon twice and finally brought an end to his master's life.
