= Udayaditya Singha =

Ahom king from 1670 to 1672

Sunyatphaa
- Chaopha Swargadeo of Ahom Kingdom
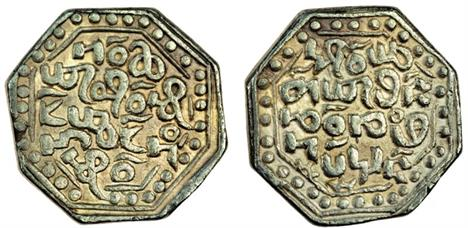

Ahom King
- Reign: April 1670 – 1672
- Predecessor: Chakradhwaj Singha
- Successor: Ramadhwaj Singha
- Born: Maju Gohain; Ahom kingdom
- Died: c. 1672; Charaideo, Ahom kingdom
- Issue: Kalia Gohain
Names
- Swargadeo Udayaditya Singha
- House: Charingia
- Dynasty: Ahom
- Father: Namrupia Raja
- Religion: Ahom religion Hinduism

Udayaditya Singha (born Maju Gohain; died 1672), also known as Sunyatpha, was Ahom King from 1670 until his deposal in 1672.

After his elder brother Swargadeo Chakradhwaj Singha died in the middle of Ahom-Mughal war, Udayaditya Singha succeeded to the throne. His reign witnessed the end of Ahom-Mughal war, which started during the reign of Chakradhwaj Singha, when the Mughal army led by Rajput prince, Ram Singh I of Amber, was decisively defeated by the Ahom forces led by Ahom commander Lachit Borphukan in the Battle of Saraighat.

The later part of his reign was characterized by the failure of military expedition against the Dafala tribes and the influence of Paramananda Sannyasi, a saintly figure from Brindaban, over Udayaditya Singha. Udayaditya's over exerted devotion towards Paramananda Sanyasi, aroused dissatisfaction among the nobles, which ultimately caused his deposition and execution. His reign was followed by a series of political anarchy and internal disturbances in the Ahom kingdom which continued till the accession of Gadadhar Singha in 1681.

== Ancestry and early life ==
Udayaditya Singha was the second son of Namrupia Raja, the grandson of Sureng Deoraja, great grandson of Ahom king Suhungmung. His grandfather Sureng Deo Raja was the founder of the Charingia branch of Royal Ahom Dynasty. Sureng Deo Raja was a valliant warrior, who fought many battles in military expedition against Chutia Kingdom and Kachari kingdom during the reign of his father Suhungmung. He also fought against the invading forces of Koch kingdom led by Chilarai during the reign of his elder brother Suklenmung and his nephew Sukhampha. The early name of Udayaditya Singha was Maju Gohain. When his elder brother Chakradhwaj Singha ascended the throne, Maju Gohain was appointed as Charingia Raja, a post usually held by the heir apparent to the throne.

== Accession ==
Swargadeo Chakradhwaj Singha died of dropsy in April 1670 CE. The heir apparent to the throne, Maju Gohain was proclaimed as the king of Ahom Kingdom. The Hindu priests and Brahmins named him as Swargadeo Udayaditya Singha, while the Tai-Ahom priests conferred on him the title Sunyatpha. He took as his queen the chief queen of his deceased brother.

== Reign ==
=== War with the Mughals ===
Udayaditya Singha ascended the throne at a time when the Ahom-Mughal war that started during the reign of his elder brother Swargadeo Chakradhwaj Singha was at its climax. The Mughal army led by the Prince Ram Singh I of Amber was desperately trying to conquer the military outpost of Guwahati, while the Ahom forces led by Lachit Borphukan and Atan Burhagohain was bravely defending it against all odds. Ram Singh I sent a proposal to the Lachit Borphukan, that if the Ahoms surrender the garrison of Guwahati in favour of Mughals, he gave his word that the Mughals will respect the boundary of Ahom kingdom which was set according to the treaty of Asura Ali in 1639 CE. The long continuance of hostilities without any decisive result produced some discontent in the Ahom camp. The demand of Ram Singh I thus, received a more encouraging response from Lachit Borphukan and his lieutenants. The proposal was sent to Swargadeo Udayaditya Singha for final decision. The king held consultation with all the nobles. While most of them are in favour of the proposal, the Prime Minister of Ahom kingdom, Atan Burhagohain opposed this proposal stating that the resistance which they had offered to the enemy and which caused such loss of men and provisions was absolutely meaningless if it was followed by their voluntary surrender of Guwahati. He also characterized the promises made by Ram Singh I as a highway made of ashes as they might not be accepted by the Mughal Emperor Aurangzeb, or by the next Mughal commander who will succeed Ram Singh I. Swargadeo Udayaditya Singha confirmed the views of the Premier Atan Burhagohain and directed the commanders to bring the war to a victorious conclusion.

When the Ahom rejected the proposal of Ram Singh I, the latter in desperation commanded a contingent of his cavalry to cross the Brahmaputra in boats and enter the plains of Guwahati by breaking through the opening at the Andharubali rampart. The Ahom commander Lachit Borphukan was seriously ill at that time and the Ahom army was demoralized by the absence of their general. On the sight of Mughal boats sailing towards Guwahati, the Ahom forces began to retreat without any fight. When the general Lachit Borphukan learnt about this he himself came to the battle scene and boarded his boat accompanied by six other war vessel and rushed towards the enemy with his seven boats. The appearance of Lachit Borphukan filled the soldiers with enthusiasm and courage. The retreating Ahom army and fleet joined their general and fell upon the invading Mughal forces. The Ahom war vessels entered into the thick of Mughal fleet and in the fight that ensued, the Mughals were completely defeated and the Ahoms gained a decisive victory. This battle is known in the history as the Battle of Saraighat, which occurred in the middle of March, 1671 CE. The Mughal forces were chased till Manas River and the Ahoms retained their possessions of Guwahati and Kamrup. Hadira, opposite Goalpara, now became the Ahom kingdom's western frontier outpost. Swargadeo Udayaditya Singha was overjoyed by this victory and he offered handsome rewards to all the generals of the victorious Ahom army. For their support and services rendered to Ahom forces in driving out the Mughal invaders, the Koch princes, Chandra Narayan, son of Mahendra Narayan, grandson of Bali Narayan, was installed as tributary ruler of Darrang, and Gandharva Narayan, was installed as the tributary ruler of Beltola. Unfortunately Lachit Borphukan who was in high fever during the battle against Mughals died soon after his memorable triumph at Saraighat. His elder brother Laluk Sola was appointed as the new Borphukan at Guwahati. Most of the prominent nobles like Atan Burhagohain remained in Guwahati in order to repel any possible Mughals invasion in Lower Assam

=== Fire in the Royal Stores ===
In 1671 CE, a treasure house at Hilikha, containing a great store of gold and silver, was burnt down. Enquiry showed that the Bharali Barua, the officer in charge of the store-house was responsible for the fire, which was caused by his carelessly leaving a lighted pipe near some inflammable material. As a punishment for his carelessness, Bharali Barua was compelled to smoke elephant's dung.

=== Dafala expedition ===
The Dafala tribe was living in the hills to the north of present-day Lakhimpur district and Sonitpur district. They use to come down to the plains on marauding excursions when they would capture Assamese people and properties. The Dafalas were however kept in check by the grant of blackmail from the Ahom rulers and by permission to use the services of the Dafala-Bahatias who were formed into a penal colony settled along the foot of the Dafala hills. The Dafalas now complained that they were on the verge of starvation owing to the long delay in the delivery of the stipulated blackmail and the payment of the taxes due from the Bahatias. Therefore, under the leadership of Bar Gam, Radha Gam, Tami Gam and Bakara Gam (the title Gam means leader or chief), the Dafalas raided a village called Gagaldubi and killed three Assamese persons, and carried off forty persons including women and children. Swargadeo Udayaditya Singha immediately arranged an expedition under Ghorakonwar Borbarua to capture and punish the Dafala raiders. The Prime Minister Atan Burhagohain tried to dissuade the monarch stating reasons that the Dafalas lived in inaccessible villages situated in the midst of dense forest and steep mountain defiles, and the hill-men could always evade the pursuers by flying from one shelter to another. The Premier instructed Udayaditya Singha to use tact and diplomacy instead of military force. But the monarch ignored the advice of Atan Burhagohain, and dispatched Ghorakonwar Borbarua against the Dafalas at the head of a considerable force.

In May 1672 CE, the Borbarua crossed the Subansiri River and halted at Rangamati from where he shifted his camp to Dulungmukh. Two Assamese officers, Tua and Tita were dispatched to bring the Dafalas to submission. The agents of Dafala chief Bakara Gam met Tua and Tita and expressed regrets for having acted disloyally against the Ahom monarch. Tua and Tita offered to secure pardon for the Dafalas, first from the Borbarua and then from the Swargadeo, and asked them to proceed to the presence of the Borbarua to pay their respects to him. The Dafalas however hesitated to appear before the Borbarua, fearing punishment under Royal orders. Their leader Bakara Gam now appeared on the scene with fifty-two followers and continued the parleys with Tua and Tita. Bakara Gam realized the insecurity of his position, and said, “The Borbarua has come to kill us. How will it be possible on the part of elephants to proceed by paths meant for the passage of dogs and jackals?” Tua and Tita sent a secret message through Ramdhan Ganak Hatkhowa to Ghorakonwar Borbarua asking him to fall upon the Dafalas during the continuance of the negotiations. The Borbarua sent a force who proceeded by boat, but the Dafalas had meanwhile left the venue on the pretext of coming back with the men and goods captured by them from the Assamese. The king accused Tua and Tita for having put the Borbarua on a wrong track and had them chained with iron fetters and imprisoned. The rains then set in, and the Borbarua was compelled to suspend operations which were made more difficult by inaccessible character of the terrain.

The king threatened to kill Borbarua if he returned to the capital without subduing the Dafalas. He even asked the Borbarua to wear the skirt of woman in the event of his further inaction. Having heard this the Borbarua came from Dulungmukh to Barchetia and then to Gangmukh, from where he sent a number of detachments under Khaga Chutia Hazarika, Kharagom, Chutia-kari Barua and Chungi Barua who proceeded by different routes against the Dafalas. But the Ahom troops could not make any headway for difficulties of communications aggravated by the torrential showers of the monsoon season. Finally when they reached the villages of the Dafalas, they found it empty, as the Dafalas had already evacuated them for safer destinations. As the Ahom soldiers were about to return, they were attacked by the Dafalas who had concealed themselves in the neighbouring jungles. The Ahom soldiers seized with panic dispersed down the slope of the mountains. Large numbers were massacred by the Dafalas, some were carried off as slaves, and the rest were chased down to the plains. The Ahom officers Khaga Hazarika and Khragom were among the slain. The Borbarua then returned to his camp at Barchetia. The King attributed this reverse to neglect and mismanagement on the part of Ghorakonwar Borbarua. He instructed the chief of his personal body-guards, Papang Chaodang Barua, to arrest the Borbarua and kept him as a prisoner in the Hatisal or Elephant stalls. The king accused the Borbarua of dereliction of duty and ordered him to be stripped naked and put to death, but on the intercession of the Queen-mother, the life of Ghorakonwar Borbarua was spared. But the king had him dismissed and Charingia Pelan Phukan of Rangmahal fame was appointed as the new Borbarua. After some time, Ghorakonwar was readmitted into the good graces of the king, and was made Bhitarual Phukan or the Commander of the household troops. During the following dry season the Dafala leaders returned the goods and released the captured Assamese prisoners of their own accord.

=== Influence of Paramananda Bairagi on Udayaditya ===
The later part of Udayaditya's reign was marked by the entry of Paramananda Bairagi or Sannyasi and his influence over the king. Paramananda Sannyasi hailed from Gakulpur near Brindaban. He was also known as Gakulpuri Sannyasi among common Assamese people, owing to his origin from Gakulpur. He had first lived at Hajo with another hermit from Kalitakuchi in Kamrup. He then stayed in Kamakhya for some time. It was believed that during his stay in Kamakhya, he obtained the power to perform miracles. Charmed by his performances of miracles, a large number of people, both male and female, became disciples of the Sannyasi. He then set out on a pilgrimage to Brahmakunda in Eastern Assam, and stayed for sometime at Kalabari in the monastery of Banmali Gosain. Here also the Sannyasi charmed the people by demonstrations of his occult power. The fame of Paramananda Sannyasi spread among the nobility in the capital Garhgaon. Udayaditya Singha also heard of the prowess of Paramananda Sannyasi and had him brought to the Royal Palace. Udayaditya was very much impressed with the miracles performed by the Sannyasi and also by his knowledge on religious topics. The king became greatly devoted to Paramananda, considered him as Guru or religious mentor and constructed for him a large monastery near the entrance of the Capital known as Chunpora-duar. With the view to enhance his Guru's respect, he ordered all the Royal officers to become disciples of Paramananda Sannyasi. Forced by Royal orders, the three Dangarias or ministers, Atan Burhagohain, Baghchowal Borpatrogohain and Langichang Borgohain and Laithepena Solal Gohain and many Phukans, Rajkhowas and Baruas became disciples of Paramananada Sannyasi. The Sannyasi claimed to know, while sitting at his own Chunpora residence, everything that the king said or did in his palace. Claims of this nature enabled the Sannyasi to exercise great sway over the mind of the king and his court.

=== Atrocities on the Vaishnava Mahantas ===
Swargadeo Udayaditya Singha became greatly devoted to Paramananda Sannyasi, and in his eagerness to advance the prestige and influence of Paramananda summoned the twelve Vaishanava Mahantas or religious heads of the Thakuria denomination and asked them to become disciples of the Gakulpuri Sannyasi. The Mahantas protested in a body; and their leaders, the Mahantas of Mayamara, Makajan, Silikhatal and Sesamukh were thrown into prison from where, the king said, they would be released only if they could satisfy him about their spiritual prowess by performing some miracle. The Mahantas replied in one voice,- We are incapable of performing miracles. We pass our days in reciting and hearing the glory of the Great God, and in offering prayers for Your Majesty’s welfare. Except this everything else is beyond our ken. The king reiterated his conviction of the omniscience of his Guru Paramananda and the consequent propriety on the part of the Mahantas to become the Sannyasi's disciples. The Thakuria Mahantas now stood as one man determined to oppose the king's design to convert them to the discipleship of the Paramananda. In this they received the tacit support of the three Gohains who thought that the time for their intervention had arrived.

=== Anti-Paramananda Movement led by Debera Hazarika ===
Debera was a member of the Ahom Lukhurakhun clan, and he held the rank of a Hazarika, commander of one thousand men. He was the son of Kharagom, the Ahom officer who had been killed in the Dafala campaign in 1672 CE. Debera was very much enraged by the atrocities committed on the Vaishnava Mahantas by Udayaditya Singha. He resolved to curb the influence of the Sannyasi and preserve the integrity and prestige of the Vaisnava monks of Assam. Being himself a disciple of Makajan Mahanta of the Thakuria denomination, he knelt down before the Mahantas and solicited their blessings for the success of his enterprise, saying,- “Your Holinesses should only bestow upon me the dust of your feet, and I shall do whatever redress is necessary.”

The king got scent of the mischief that was brewing against him and his protégé; and with the object of keeping Debera away from the capital for some time he ordered him to command an expedition against the Mishmi rebels living near Sadiya. Debera was witty enough to understand the real intention of the monarch, and informed the king that he would start on the expedition after three days as he was convalescent at that time having just recovered from polypus of the nose. On that very night, Debera met the three Dangarias and persuaded them to support Sarugohain, the younger brother of Swargadeo Udayaditya Singha, in his attempt to seize the throne. Debera then broached the proposal to Sarugohain who readily accepted the offer. The prince gave vent to his resentment on the conduct of Udayaditya Singha,-“The Bairagi has become to my brother, not a mere hermit, but an object of extreme veneration, the Saheb of his head. The Dangarias have also accepted initiation from the Bairagi, and the twelve Mahantas have been summoned. Justice cannot tolerate this impious situation.” With the help of Debera and his brother Mohan Deka, Ratanpuria Hazarika, Namgila Hazarika and Tairai Dolakasharia Barua, Sarugohain collected one thousand armed followers to assail and surround the royal residence at Haithaguri and seized the person of the reigning monarch. Meanwhile, Udayaditya got scent of the conspiracy and at once ordered the gates of the city closed and his brother to be arrested. The conspirators decided that they got no time to lose, and therefore decided to act quickly.

=== Palace Coup and Udayaditya deposed ===
In November 1672 CE, Sarugohain and his supporters fully armed approached the palace at mid night. They requested the Chief of the guards, guarding the entrance, Pacha-Simalu Hazarika of Dimaruguria unit to open the gate. But Pacha Simalu Hazarika refused to let the conspirators in. Debera asked Gajpuria Hatibarua, the officer-in-charge of elephants and Parikshit Dhekeri Mahout, the elephant rider, to employ elephants to break the gates of the Palace. The elephants broke open the gates and the conspirators entered inside the Palace compound. The entrance guards and their chief Pacha Simalu Hazarika, after offering some resistance, were killed by the conspirators. Sarugohain, accompanied by other conspirators marched towards the Royal Audience Hall. Charingia Pelan Borbarua, Charingia Barua and Papang Chaodang Barua, along with their men rushed forward to resist the conspirators led by Sarugohain, but they were over-powered, after offering some resistance. Sarugohain hurled his spear at the Borbarua and pierced him at the thigh. The Prince then inflicted the finishing blows on the Borbarua and killed the Chaodang Barua as well. Swargadeo Udayaditya Singha, soundly asleep in his bed, heard faintly the uproar and commotion outside, but the body-guard on duty in the Royal bed-chamber, who had already been tutored by Debera, informed the monarch that the disturbance was due to the elephants coming out of their stalls, and the attempt made by the Borbarua to bring them round. The king was satisfied with the answer, and refrained from making further enquiries.

Meanwhile, Sarugohain stationed himself at the king's audience-chamber, and dispatched men to guard the several gates of the palace compound. Debera and Mohan deka removed the ladder leading to the royal apartments. Those who opposed Sarugohain and Debera were instantly put to death. Having besieged Udayaditya Singha in his bed chamber and making it impossible for him to escape, Sarugohain seated in the audience hall, declared himself to be king. Ghorakonwar Bhitarual Phukan who had assisted Sarugohain in his bid for the throne was immediately re-elevated to the office of Borbarua. Many royal officers, except Hari Borpatrogohain came and offered their allegiance to the new king. Hari Borpatrogohain was dismissed from his office. Sarugohain appointed one of his loyal followers, Chapa as the new Borpatrogohain.

== Death of Udayaditya and Paramananda Sannyasi ==
On the following day Udayaditya Singha was placed on a sedan and led to Charaideo Hill. His mother beseeched Sarugohain to spare the life of Udayaditya, or kill her along with the deposed monarch. Sarugohain consoled his mother saying that he and his brother would exercise joint domination, he from his headquarters at Garhgaon and Udayaditya from his capital Charaideo. Udayaditya was put to death soon after his arrival in Charaideo. Before he died he had put a handful of rice in his mouth and said,--“An innocent is being killed! O, Great God, may retribution descend on him who is committing this crime!” Some sources states that the king was poisoned by Debera. The three wives of Udayaditya were also put to death. Udayaditya Singha's Guru, Paramananda Sannyasi, who had unwittingly caused the revolution, was arrested by Sarugohain and Debera. He was subjected to various tortures, insults and humiliations, and later put to death. His corpse was placed on a raft and set adrift on the Dikhow River, as a warning to others who ever schemed to set up a new order.

== Legacy ==
Swargadeo Udayaditya Singha's reign was remarkable chiefly for the expulsion of invading Mughal forces from Kamrup and the victory of Ahoms in the Battle of Saraighat. By this time, the Ahoms were able to make their own cannon, as cannons manufactured during his reign were found in Guwahati. The Bairagi Ali or road in Upper Assam was constructed during his reign. Contemporary historians remarked that he lacked the strength and intelligence of his elder brother Swargadeo Chakradhwaj Singha, yet one must not forget that he extended full supports and aids to the Ahom generals in Guwahati who were fighting against the Mughal invaders. While it reflected his fighting spirit and determination, but subsequent events also showed that he was stubborn and lacked the knowledge of political diplomacy and military skills. The military disaster in the campaign against the Dafalas proves it. His stubbornness to bring the old Vaishnava Mahantas or Monks of Assam under the influence of Paramananda Sannyasi was a political blunder of highest magnitude which ultimately cost him his throne and his life. The political unrest and anarchy which began during his reign will continue for another few years, which will be considered as one of the dark chapters in the history of Ahom kingdom, as kings became mere puppets in the hands of powerful ministers who will install and depose king at will. The period of ministerial supremacy will continue till 1681 CE, when Gadadhar Singha from Tungkhungia line of Ahom Dynasty ascended the throne and put an end to the domination of ministers over the monarch.

== See also ==
Debera Borbarua
