= Garhgaon =

Gargaon Tsé-hung
- Historical place
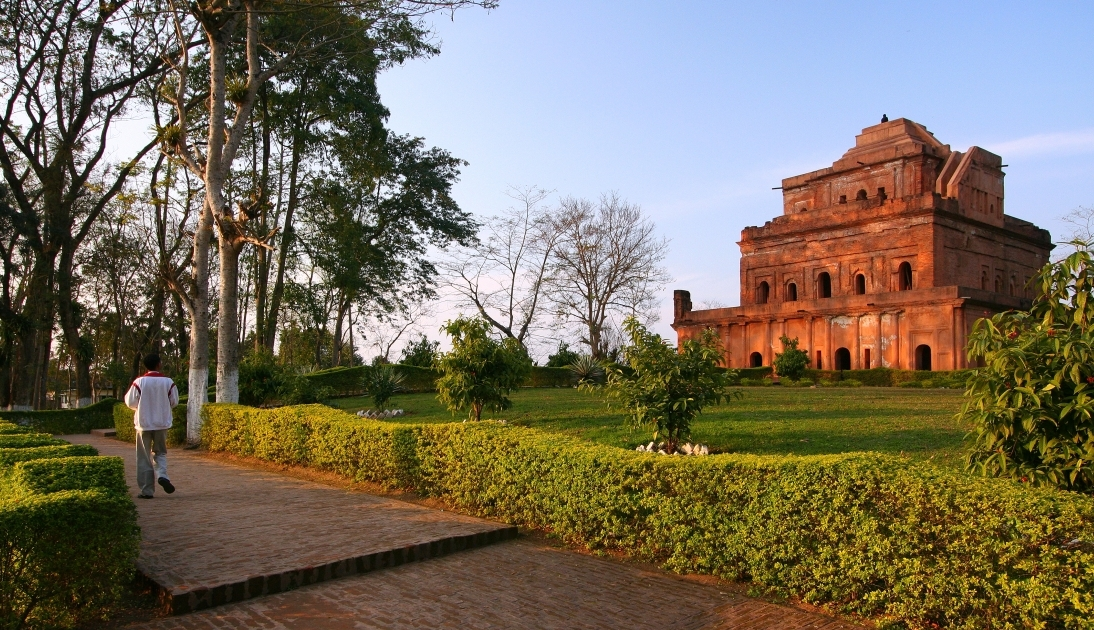
- Kareng Ghar of Gargaon

- Location in Assam, India Gargaon (India)
- Coordinates: 26.935531°N 94.744257°E
- Country: India
- State: Assam
- District: Sivasagar

Area Gargaon
  - Total: 1,200 km^{2} (460 sq mi)
- Elevation: 95 m (312 ft)

Population (2025)
  - Total: 85,630
  - Density: 71/km^{2} (180/sq mi)

Languages
  - Official: Assamese
- Time zone: UTC+5:30 (IST)
- ISO 3166 code: IN-AS
- Vehicle registration: AS

Gargaon (Tai-Ahom:Tsé-hung;pronounced [ɡaɹˈɡãʊ]) is a historic city in Assam, India and served as the capital of the Ahom kingdom for many years. It was built by the Ahom king Suklenmung (Gargaiya Roja) in 1540. It lies 13 km east of present-day Sivasagar City, headquarters of the Sivasagar district. The palace structures were made of stone and wood. In 1747, Pramatta Singha, son of Rudra Singha, constructed a brick wall of about 5 km in length surrounding the Gargaon palace and the masonry gate leading to it to boost security.

The old palace was destroyed and the present day seven-storied palace was rebuilt around 1752 by Rajeswar Singha (Suremphaa) (1751–1769).

== History ==
Suklenmung who intervened against a Toungoo dynasty attack on MongKwang in Kachin State of Myanmar was married to the princess Nang Sao Seng, the daughter of Chao Siu-Kwei of MongKwang. It is said that the Ahom capital Garhgoan was built at the suggestion of this Mong Kwang queen Nang Sao Seng. In 1575, the king of Mongkwang, Chao Ka Pha II took shelter in Ahom territory after his state was devastated by the Burmese.

== Description ==
During the expedition of Mir Jumla in 1662, he was accompanied by a writer named Shihabuddin who wrote a detailed account of the expedition and gave a very full description of the people and the country. About the capital he wrote,

"The city of Gargaon has four gates of stone set in mud, from each of which to the Raja's palace, for a distance of three kos, an extremely strong, high and wide embankment (al) has been constructed for the passage of men. Around the city, in the place of wall, there is an encompassing bamboo plantation running continuously, two kos or more in width" ... "In short the city of Gargaon appeared to us to be circular, wide and an aggregation of villages. Round the Raja's house an embankment has been made and strong bamboos have been planted on it close together to serve as a wall. Round it a moat has been dug which is deeper than a man's height in most places and is always full of water. The enclosure is one kos and fourteen chains in circumference inside it high and spacious thatched houses have been built."

=== Solang ghar ===
"The Raja's audience hall, called, solang, is 120 cubit long (~60m) and 30 cubit broad (~15m), measured on the inside. It stands on 66 pillars, each of them about four cubits round (~2m). They have smoothed these huge pillars so well, that at first sight they seemed to have been turned on a lathe. Though the people pretended to have the art of turning on lathes, yet reason refuses to believe it. My pen fails to describe in detail the other arts and rare inventions employed in decorating the woodwork of this palace. Probably nowhere else in the whole world can wooden houses be built with such decoration and figure-carving as by the people of this country. The sides of this palace have been partitioned into wooden lattices of various designs carved in relief, and adorned, both with and outside, with mirrors of brass, polished so finely that when sunbeams fall on them, the eye is dazzled by the flashing back on light. This mansion was completed by 12,000 men working for one year. At end of this palace, on four pillars facing each other, rings have been fixed, nine rings on each pillar. Whenever the Raja wished to live in this house, a throne was placed between the four pillars, and nine canopies, each of different stuff, were fastened to the nine rings above the throne. The Raja sat on the throne under the canopies, the drummers beat their drums and dands ... As for the many other wooden mansions -- carved, decorated, strong, broad and long, which were inside the palace enclosure, their elegance and peculiar features can better be seen than described. But may not even an infidel be fated to behold these houses unless this country is annexed to the Imperial dominions, so that the might not be involved in the calamities that overwhelmed us."

=== The palace ground ===
"Outside the enclosure of the palace, a perfectly neat and pure mansion has been built for the residence of the Raja; and the nobles have built very nice and strong houses near the royal palace. The Bar Phukan, who was the Raja's son-in-law, had laid out an extremely elegant and fresh garden round a very pure and sweet tank within the grounds of his mansion. Truly it was a pleasant spot and heart-ravishing and pure abode. Owing to excess of damp, it is not the custom in this country to make the country of houses on the surface of the ground; but they built their houses on platforms resting on wooden pillars."

== Photo gallery ==
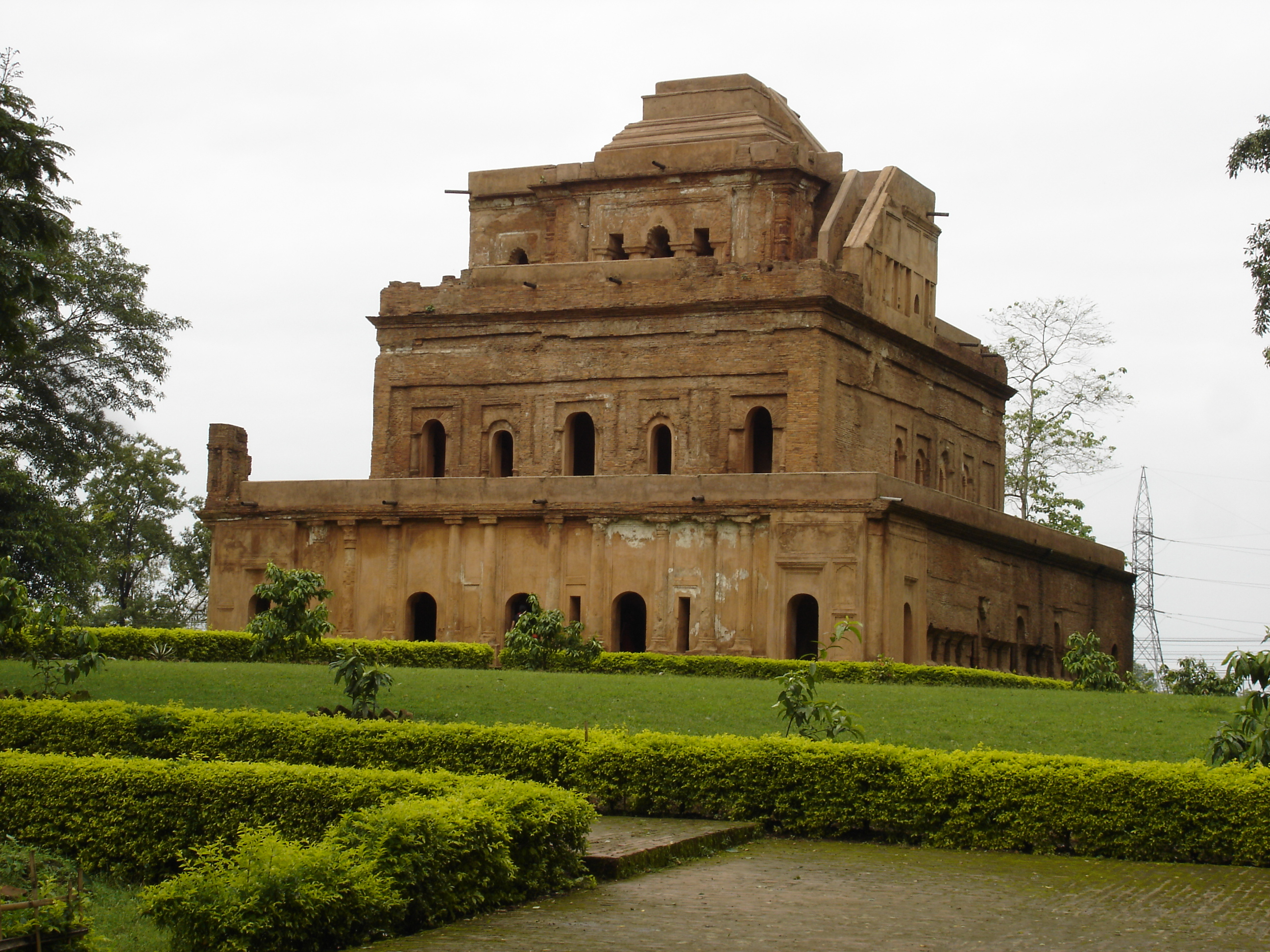
Gargaon Kareng Ghar

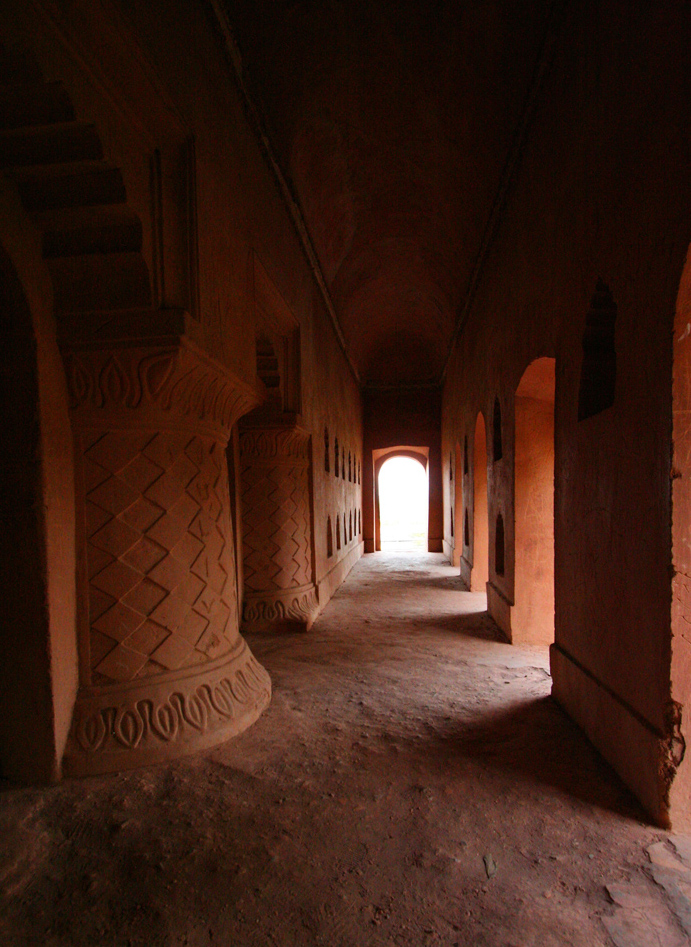
Inside the Kareng Ghar

== See also ==
- Ahom Dynasty
- Talatal Ghar
- Rang Ghar
- Sibsagar district
