= Purandar Singha =

- Chaopha Swargadeo of Ahom Kingdom
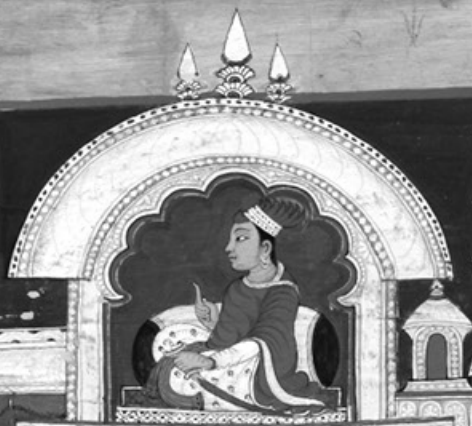
- Contemporary depiction, 1836

Ahom King
- 1st reign: February 1818 – June 1819
- Predecessor: Chandrakanta Singha
- Successor: Chandrakanta Singha
- 2nd reign: April 1833 – September 1838
- Predecessor: Jogeswar Singha
- Successor: Monarchy abolished
- Born: 1807; Silmari, British Bengal
- Died: 1 October 1846 (aged 38–39); Ahom kingdom
- Burial: Charaideo Moidam
- Consort: Maharani Chandrakala
- Issue: Kameswar Singha; Rupahi Aideo
- Father: Brajanath Gohain, Charing Raja
- Religion: Hinduism

Purandar Singha (c. 1807 – 1 October 1846) was the final Ahom King, reigning firstly from 1818 to 1819 and again from 1833 to 1838.

The first time, he was installed by Ruchinath Burhagohain in 1818 CE, after the latter deposed Chandrakanta Singha from the throne. His first reign ended in 1819 CE, during the second Burmese invasion of Assam when his forces were defeated and the Burmese reinstalled Chandrakanta Singha on the throne. He along with Ruchinath Burhagohain continued their efforts to expel Burmese invaders, by seeking help from the British and through armed struggle. After First Anglo-Burmese War, the British East India Company took over Assam from the Burmese invaders.

Finding it difficult to administer an unfamiliar region and sensing discontent among the local inhabitants to foreign rule, the British authorities decided to restore Upper Assam to a prince of Ahom Dynasty. Purander Singha was found suitable for this post and therefore, in April 1833 CE, except for Sadiya and Matak rajya, the entire territory of Upper Assam was formally made over to him, on the condition of yearly tribute of 50,000 rupees. Later, in 1838 CE, finding him incompetent and a defaulter in payments of revenue, the British formally annexed his kingdom, putting an end to a 600-year reign of the Ahom dynasty. When Purandar Singha accepted the position of Prince of Upper Assam, he did not realize the difficulties of the new position.

== Ancestry and family history ==
Purandar Singha was the son of Brajanath Gohain, son of Bijoy Barmura Gohain, grandson of Ratneswar Saru-gohain, and great-grandson of Swargadeo Rajeswar Singha. Ratneswar Saru-gohain with his brother Maju-Gohain and Rajeswar Singha's elder brother Mohanmala Maladev Gohain had joined the ranks of rebels against his uncle Swargadeo Lakshmi Singha during the first phase of the Moamoria rebellion. But after the Moamoria rebels achieved success, they treacherously murdered him, by administering poison on his food. Later Lakshmi Singha regained his throne, by defeating the Moamoria rebels. Bijoy Barmura Gohain, son of Ratneswar Saru-gohain also became involved in a conspiracy against the regime of Lakshmi Singha. He was caught and was punished by inflicting mutilation on his ears. He again conspired against the king, only to be caught, and suffered further mutilation. His young son Brajanath Gohain also suffered mutilation of his ears by royal orders. During the reign of next monarch Gaurinath Singha, Bijoy Barmura plotted against the king, in association with Hangsa Narayan, the tributary ruler of Darrang. The plot was discovered and Hangsa Narayan was seized and put to death. Bijoy Barmura with his family escaped to the Kachari kingdom.

In 1803 CE, during the reign of Kamaleswar Singha, Bijoy Barmura joined some fugitive Moamoria rebels in the Kachari kingdom and planned an uprising against the Ahom kingdom. They were aided by the Kachari king Krishna Chandra, and a large number of Kacharis joined their ranks. The Kachari-Moamoria coalition rose against Ahom authority in the present day, Nagaon and Morigaon districts, which resulted in a full-scale war with the Ahoms. The Kachari-Moamoria coalition was defeated and many rebel leaders were either killed or captured. Kamaleswar Singha demanded that Krishna Chandra hand over Bijoy Bormura Gohain, but he escaped with his son Brajanath Gohain to British-ruled Bengal. Bijoy Barmura spent the rest of his life in Silmari in Bengal. In 1809 CE, Brajanath Gohain went to Calcutta, met with the Governor-General and tried to procure military aid to fulfil his ambition to become king, in exchange for acknowledging British supremacy, but in vain.

== Birth and early life ==
Purandar Singha was born in 1807 CE, at Silmari, located in British-ruled Bengal. His grandfather Bijoy Barmura Gohain and his father Brajanath Gohain were living in Silmari as exiled princes, after their attempts to become king of Ahom kingdom failed. The family faced economic hardships during their exile, and life in Silmari was very hard for them. Purandar Singha also spent his early life amidst economic hardships.

== Events leading to his accession ==
=== Internal turmoil and first Burmese invasion ===
In 1815 CE, Purnananda Burhagohain, Prime Minister of the Ahom kingdom, sent a deputation to arrest Badan Chandra Borphukan, the Ahom viceroy at Guwahati, who was charged with atrocities committed on the people of Lower Assam, but, being warned in time by his daughter, Pijou Gabharu, who had married one of the Premier's sons, he escaped to Bengal. He proceeded to Calcutta, and alleging that Purnananda Burhagohain was subverting the Ahom Government and ruining the country, endeavored to persuade the Governor-General Lord Hastings to dispatch an expedition against Purnananda Burhagohain. Lord Hasting, however, refused to interfere in any way. Meanwhile, Badan Chandra had struck up a friendship with the Calcutta agent of the Burmese government and he went with this man to the Court of Amarapura, where he was accorded a meeting with the Burmese king, Bodawpaya. He repeated his misrepresentations regarding the conduct of Purnananda Burhagohain, alleging that he had usurped the King's authority, and that owing to his misgovernment, the lives of all, both high and low, were in danger. At last, he obtained a promise of help. Towards the end of the year 1816 an army of about eight thousand men under the command of General Maha Minhla Minkhaung was dispatch from Burma with Badan Chandra Borphukan. It was joined en route by the chiefs of Mungkong, Hukong, and Manipur, and, by the time Namrup was reached, its number had swollen to about sixteen thousand. Purnananda Burhagohain sent an army to oppose the invaders. A battle was fought at Ghiladhari in which the Assamese army was routed. At this juncture Purnananda Burhagohain died or some say, committed suicide by swallowing diamonds, leaving the entire Ahom government leaderless. His eldest son, Ruchinath was appointed as Burhagohain. The Ahom war council decided to continue the war; and a fresh army was hastily equipped and sent to resist the Burmese. Like the former one, it was utterly defeated, near Kathalbari east of Dihing. The Burmese continued their advance pillaging and burning the villages along their line of march. Ruchinath Burhagohain endeavored in vain to induce the reigning Ahom monarch Chandrakanta Singha to retreat to Guwahati, and then, perceiving that the latter intended to sacrifice him, in order to conciliate Badan Chandra and his Burmese allies, fled westwards to Guwahati.

The Burmese occupied the capital Jorhat and Badan Chandra triumphantly entered the capital, interviewed Chandrakanta Singha and offered to run the affairs of the state as his capacity as Mantri-Phukan or Prime Minister. The young king, Chandrakanta, had no alternative but to acquiesce in Badan Chandra's proposal. Badan Chandra now became all powerful and he used his Burmese allies to plunder and slay all the relations and adherents of Purnananda Burhagohain.

Meanwhile, friendly overtures were made to Chandrakanta from the Burmese camp. An Ahom princess, Hemo Aideo, (also known as Bhamo Aideo) was offered to Bodawpaya for the royal harem along with fifty elephants. Hemo Aideo was accompanied by large retinue. The Burmese were paid an indemnity, and in April 1817, they returned to their own country.

== Invitation from Ruchinath Burhagohain to Brajanath Gohain and Chandrakanta deposed ==
A few months later, the political scene in the Ahom kingdom had changed. Badan Chandra Borphukan was assassinated by his political rivals, aided by the Queen-mother Numali Rajmao. She with nobles called on Ruchinath Burhagohain to return to the capital Jorhat. But Chandrakanta's peace with the Burmese, his support for Badan Chandra and his refusal to go down to Guwahati at the approach of the Burmese army, had aroused the suspicion of Ruchinath Burhagohai, who saw him as mainly responsible for the attempts made against his father Purnananda Burhagohain, and the arrival of the Burmese troops. Ruchinath took up the case of Brajanath Gohain, great-grandson of Ahom king Swargadeo Rajeswar Singha, who was leading an exiled life at Silmari in Bengal and invited him to become a candidate for the throne. Brajanath Gohain agreed and came to Guwahati where he was joined by Ruchinath Burhagohain and his supporters. After gathering a force of Hindustani mercenaries and local levies, Ruchinath and his party proceeded to Jorhat. Chandrakanta fled to Rangpur, leaving Luku Dekaphukan in charge of the capital. Luku Dekaphukan offered some resistance to Ruchinath Burhagohain's forces but the resistance was easily repulsed and Luku Dekaphukan was killed.

The victors succeeded in bringing over the royal troops to their side. They then entered Jorhat on February 17, 1818.

== Accession ==
Brajanath at once caused coins to be struck in his own name, but it was now remembered that he was ineligible for the throne, as he had suffered mutilation of one of his ears. The Ahom considered their king as of divine origin and the person of the monarch, was sacred, and any noticeable scar or blemish, even a scratch received in play, a pit of smallpox, or a wound received in action, was a bar to succession. Therefore, Brajanath's son Purandar, then only ten years old, was brought from Silmari, who arrived in time and was acclaimed as sovereign of the Ahom kingdom of Assam, in February 1818 CE. A few days later Biswanath Marangikhowa Gohain, brother of Ruchinath Burhagohain, sliced off Chandrakanta's right ear in order to disqualify him from again sitting on the throne.

== First reign (1818–1819 CE) ==
=== Brajanath exerts real authority ===
Since Purandar Singha was very young, the real authority lay with Brajanath Gohain and Ruchinath Burhagohain. They immediately made a clean sweep of all the nobles and officers, including the Borgohain, Borpatrogohain and Borbarua, who were suspected of still bearing loyalty to Chandrakanta Singha. Being the father of the monarch, Brajanath Gohain exercised the virtual powers of a sovereign. He appointed himself as Charing Raja and Juvaraj or heir apparent. He also issued coins and grants lands to Brahmins in his own name, though it was the king who could perform these acts.

=== Second Burmese invasion and reinstallation of Chandrakanta Singha ===
Meanwhile, the friends of Badan Chandra Borphukan went to the court of the Burmese monarch Bodawpaya and appealed for help. Bodawpaya, through his marriage to Hemo Aideo, had an alliance with Chandrakanta Singha, and dispatched a fresh army of 30,000 men under Alungmingi, also known as Kiamingi Borgohain. The Assamese army resisted the Burmese in Phulpanichiga near the Janji River on February 17, 1819. Some sources stated that the battle took place in Machkhowa in Sibsagar district. Initially, the Assamese resisted Burmese with some spirit, but at a critical point in the engagement, their commander lost his nerve. They were defeated and beat a hasty retreat to Jorhat. Purandar Singha, his father Brajanath Gohain and Ruchinath Burhagohain fled to Guwahati taking with them all the valuables from the royal treasury, worth 3.5 million rupees. The triumphant Burmese now searched for Chandrakanta Singha, led him from his retreat and properly installed him on the throne.

Purandar Singha and Ruchinath Burhagohain regrouped their troops in Guwahati. The Burmese commander Momai Barua marched towards Guwahati at the head of a large Burmese force. An Assamese force, under the leadership of Bhisma Gogoi Borphukan was dispatched by Purandar Singha to resist the invaders. Both sides fought a battle in Khagarijan (present day Nagaon) on 11 June 1819, in which the Assamese army was defeated. The Burmese occupied Guwahati and Purandar Singha and Ruchinath Burhagohain escaped to Bengal.

== Appeal to the British ==
Purander Singha and Ruchinath Burhagohain appealed to British Governor-General Lord Hastings, to help recover their kingdom. He replied that the British Government was not accustomed to interfere in the internal affairs of foreign states. Meanwhile, Chandrakanta Singha and his Burmese allies asked the British authorities for the extradition of the fugitives, but to these requests also a deaf ear was turned.

== Triangular contest between Chandrakanta, Purandar and the Burmese ==
Purandar Singha and Ruchinth Burhagohain started recruiting soldiers and mercenaries from Goalpara, Bengal and Bhutan, and rallied their troops in Duars, an area located on the borders of Bhutan and Assam. With the aid of a British soldier and trader, Robert Bruce, the force was supplied with guns and firearms.

Meanwhile, Chandrakanta Singha tried to free himself from Burmese influence, which resulted in the Third Burmese Invasion of Assam, in March, 1821 CE. Defeated near Jorhat, he retreated to Guwahati, and started gathering more troops. The Burmese general installed Jogeswar Singha as the king of the Ahom kingdom, after getting approval from the Burmese monarch Bagyidaw. Purandar Singha decided to take advantage of the situation. He sent his men under the leadership of Robert Bruce, to attack Chandrakanta Singha's forces in Guwahati, in May, 1821 CE. They were defeated, and their commander Bruce was taken prisoner. He was later released when he agreed to enter into the service of Chandrakanta Singha and to supply his soldiers with firearms and ammunition. Purandar Singha retreated towards the border with Bhutan to rally his forces; and the Burmese marched against Chandrakanta Singha's position in Guwahati. Alarmed by the size of the Burmese army, Chandrakanta Singha retreated to British-ruled Bengal.

== Attempt to oust the Burmese invaders ==
Towards the end of 1821, Chandrakanta collected a force of about two thousand men, consisting of Sikhs and Hindustanis from British-ruled Bengal. He rallied his men in the Goalpara district, and Robert Bruce obtained for him three hundred muskets and nine maunds of ammunition from Calcutta. The Burmese troops and their followers were so numerous that it was found impossible to provide them with supplies in any one place. They were, therefore, distributed about the country in a number of small detachments. Chandrakanta Singha, seeing his opportunity, returned to the attack and, after inflicting several defeats on the Burmese, recaptured Guwahati in January 1822 CE.

Meanwhile, Purandar Singha and Ruchinath Burhagohain rallied their troops in Bhutan and also recruited new soldiers from Bhutan and Bijni. Encouraged by the defeats of Burmese at the hands of Chandrakanta Singha, Purandar Singha and Ruchinath Burhagohain also started to harass Burmese troops especially on the north bank of Brahmaputra. The Burmese commander Mingimaha Tilowa Baju sent a long letter to the British Governor-General at Calcutta, protesting against the facilities which had been accorded to the Ahom princes and demanded their extradition, but the British authority gave no reply.

== Arrival of Mingi Maha Bandula and defeat of Chandrakanta Singha ==
Meanwhile, news of Burmese reverses in Assam reached Burma. The Burmese monarch Bagyidaw sent his finest general Mingi Maha Bandula to reclaim Assam with reinforcements of 20,000 soldiers. Undaunted by enemy strength, Chandrakanta Singha marched into Upper Assam with approximately 2000 men consisting of Sikhs and Hindustani mercenaries and some local Assamese people recruited around Guwahati. After pushing the enemy forces back, he pitched his camp in Mahgarh (presently known as Kokilamukh; located in Jorhat district near the capital Jorhat). On 19 April 1822 A.D. the 20,000 Burmese led by Mingi Maha Bandula and the 2000 mixed Assamese-Hindustani forces led by Chandrakanta Singha fought the decisive battle at Mahgarh. Chandrakanta Singha is said to have displayed unusual vigour and courage by himself present in the thick of battle; personally leading his soldiers; and engaged in hand-to-hand combat with enemy soldiers. For some time his troops held their own, but in the end their ammunition gave out and they were defeated with a loss of 1500 men. The Burmese won the battle due to their numerical superiority but sustained losses more than that of Chandrakanta's forces. Chandrakanta Singha and his remaining forces managed to escape back to Guwahati as the Burmese, like Chandrakanta Singha's forces run out of ammunitions and a lot of them were injured or dead after the battle.

Mingi Maha Bandula sent Burmese Commander Mingi Maha Tilowa Baju in pursuit of Chandrakanta Singha. Unable to resist the Burmese with his small force, Chandrakanta Singha fell back to Hadirachowki (Assam chowki), where he made preparation to resist the Burmese with his mixed levies consisting of Sikh, Hindustanis and Assamese soldiers. On 21 June 1822, Chandrakanta Singha made his final stand against Mingi Maha Tilowa Baju and his Burmese forces in the battle of Hadirachowki. In the battle Chandrakanta Singha was finally defeated and his army eliminated. Chandrakanta Singha narrowly escaped to British ruled Goalpara district.

Meanwhile, after receiving the news of Chandrakanta's defeat and threatened by growing Burmese power, Purandar Singha and Ruchinath Burhagohain also withdrew their forces from Assam. The victorious Burmese assumed themselves as the undisputed Masters of Brahmaputra valley.

== Anglo-Burmese War and British occupation of Assam ==
In 1824 CE, the First Anglo-Burmese War broke out. The Burmese army was defeated and expelled from Assam, Cachar and Manipur. Finally, the Burmese monarch sued for peace and the treaty of Yandabo was signed by both parties on 24 February 1826. According to the terms and conditions of the treaty, the Burmese monarch renounced all claims over Assam and British became the masters of the Brahmaputra valley.

== Restoration of Ahom rule in Upper Assam under Purandar Singha ==
After the British annexation of Assam, many members of the Ahom Dynasty, including former Ahom king Chandrakanta Singha, appealed to the British Government to restore Ahom rule. Initially, the British chose to ignore these appeals, but as time passed, the British authorities sensed the growing discontent to foreign rule among the people. Meanwhile, certain members of former Ahom royal family and nobles conspired to overthrow British rule in Assam. While the conspiracy was detected, and the conspirators punished, the British authorities were concerned over a growing dissatisfaction among the people with British rule. Therefore, in an attempt to pacify the people, in 1832 CE, the British Government considered restoring Upper Assam to the former Ahom royal family as a tributary princedom. The two most suitable candidates for the throne were Chandrakanta Singha and Purandar Singha. After some interviews with the candidates and discussions among the British Officers, Purandar Singha was selected for the throne. In his report to the British government, Thomas Campbell Robertson, then Commissioner and Political Agent of Assam, wrote as follows regarding Purandar Singha's qualifications:

“I have had several interviews with Purandar Singh at Gauhati, and see no reason, from his outward appearance and manners, to doubt of his fitness for the dignity, for which all unite in preferring him to his only rival Chandrakant. Purandar Singh is a young man, apparently about 25 years of age. His countenance is pleasing, and his manners extremely good. His natural abilities seem respectable and his disposition mild and pacific…Major White and Lieutenants Mathie and Rutherford are all decidedly of opinion that Purandar Singh is the best person fitted to be at the head of the State which it has been decided to create.” Political Proceedings of the Government of Bengal, dated 4 February 1833, No. 8, pp. 123–24

Some historians are of the opinion that the selection of Purandar Singha over Chandrakanta Singha as a tributary ruler of Upper Assam was a British political ploy. Since Chandrakanta Singha inherited the kingdom from his elder brother, the Ahom king Swargadeo Kamaleswar Singha, therefore the legal basis of Chandrakanta Singha was more firm than Purandar Singha. Purandar Singha lived most of his life in exile with his father; therefore if the British install Purandar Singha to the throne, he would be more grateful and will submit to British rule more readily than his rival candidate Chandrakanta Singha.

== Second reign (1833–1838 CE) ==
In April 1833, Purandar Singha was appointed as a protected prince in charge of Upper Assam, excluding Sadiya and Matak regions, on a stipulated tribute of 50,000 rupees. Jorhat was made the capital of the state. The entire civil administration was left in his hands and a detachment of the Assam Light Infantry of the British army was left there for the protection of Purandar Singha and the preservation of peace.

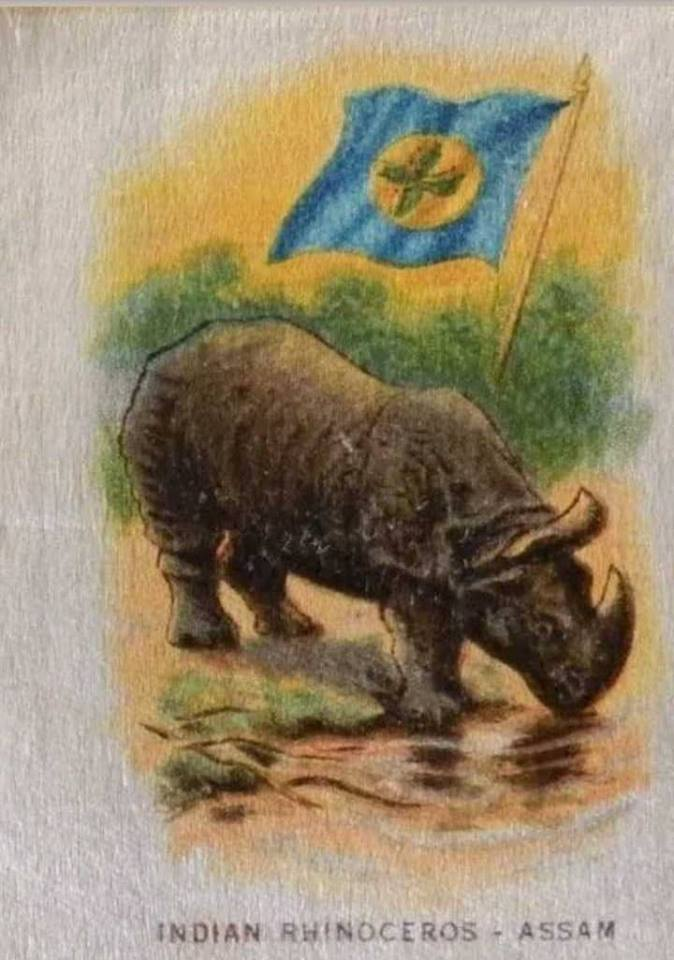
Cigarette card of the 19th century showing the flag of Assam with a soaring bird and rhinoceros, possibly the official flag during the second reign of Purandar Singha, 1833–38

=== Appointment of officials ===
At the onset of his second reign, Purandar Singha appointed officials according to the traditional Ahom system of governance, but since his kingdom's territory was very much less than the territories of the Ahom kingdom, before 1826 CE, he left many official posts vacant. Also owing to the depleted conditions of the kingdom's economy, the state treasury could not have borne the burden of giving salaries to these officials. He appointed Mahidhar, the son of Ruchinath Burhagohain, to the post of Burhagohain. He created three mels or estates, which are called “Maju Mel”, “Mahi Mel” and “Saru Mel”. He allotted Maju Mel or estate to his nephew, Narnarayan Gohain, Mahi Mel or estate to his cousin Ishwar Gohain, and Suru Mel or estate to his uncle, Brajanath Gohain's younger brother, Indunath Gohain. Among all his officials, Maniram Dewan was the most powerful, with some real authority. While Purandar Singha had appointed Burhagohain as his Prime Minister, it was actually Maniram Dewan who looked after administration of the state and monitored the collection of revenue.

=== Defaults in the payments of revenue and maladministration ===
After his accession as the tributary ruler of Upper Assam under British Government, Purandar Singha began well with his accounts of payments of revenue. But within three years, he began to make default in his payments. He begged for a considerable reduction in the amount of revenue, as he explained that the country was badly ravaged by the Burmese invaders, affecting all spheres of life of the people, which includes social and economical. Imposing taxation was also difficult because, unlike other parts of India, common people in Assam rarely used money. Captain Francis Jenkins, the new Commissioner and Political Agent, held an enquiry into Purandar Singh's administration and found it a hot bed of corruption and misfeasance. His subjects were oppressed and misgoverned and his rule is very distasteful to the bulk of the population. Purandar Singha was himself found guilty of gathering personal fortune rather than concentrating on good governance for his people.

In 1838 a British army surgeon, John McCosh, gave a description of the condition of Purandar Singha and his court officials:

"The present representative of this once powerful dynasty (Svargadeo or Lord of Heaven, as he pleased to call himself) now resides in Jorhat in noisy pomp and tawdry splendor; his resources limited to that of a zamindar; his numerous nobility reduced to beggary or to exist upon bribery and corruption; and his kingly court (for he still maintains his regnal dignity) more resembling the parade of a company of strolling players than anything imposing or sovereign."

== Purandar Singha deposed and the end of Ahom authority in Assam ==
Purandar Singha having thus proved a failure, his kingdom was placed under direct British control, in September 1838 CE. With the deposal of Purandar Singha and the annexation of Upper Assam to the territories of the British East India Company, all vestiges of Ahom authority in Assam came to an end after a reign of approximately 600 years. His kingdom was divided into two districts, Sibsagar district and Lakhimpur district.

== Later life ==
After the annexation of his kingdom by the British, Purandar Singha continued to live in Jorhat. In October 1838 CE, a pension of 1000 rupees per month was granted to him but he declined to accept it. He hoped for the eventual restitution of his state as a result of his petition to the Governor-General. The petition of Purandar Singha was turned down by the Governor-General, after consultation with British officials serving in Assam.

During that time, the British Government officials and many other adventurers dug the Royal Tombs or Maidams of Ahom kings in Charaideo, in search of treasures, as it was widely known that the material properties of the dead king, like swords, furniture, utensils, gold and silver jewellery, and other valuables were also entombed along with the dead king in the Maidam. Purandar Singha, at first protested the desecration of his ancestors’ tombs, but finding it hopeless to appeal, in a bid to preserve the treasure; he himself dug many Royal Tombs and recovered a large booty of treasures. Fearing outburst and reactions from other princes of the Ahom Dynasty, he spread the news that he had dug the ancestral tombs to recover their bones and other remains, to take them to the Ganges, for spiritual and religious purpose.

== Death ==
Purandar Singha lived out the rest of his life in Jorhat along with his family. He died on 1 October 1846, CE, a few days before the Durga Puja celebrations. The former Ahom nobles attended his funeral and paid their respect to the departed king. His remains were entombed in a Maidam, constructed in Jorhat. Presently, the place is known as Raja Maidam.

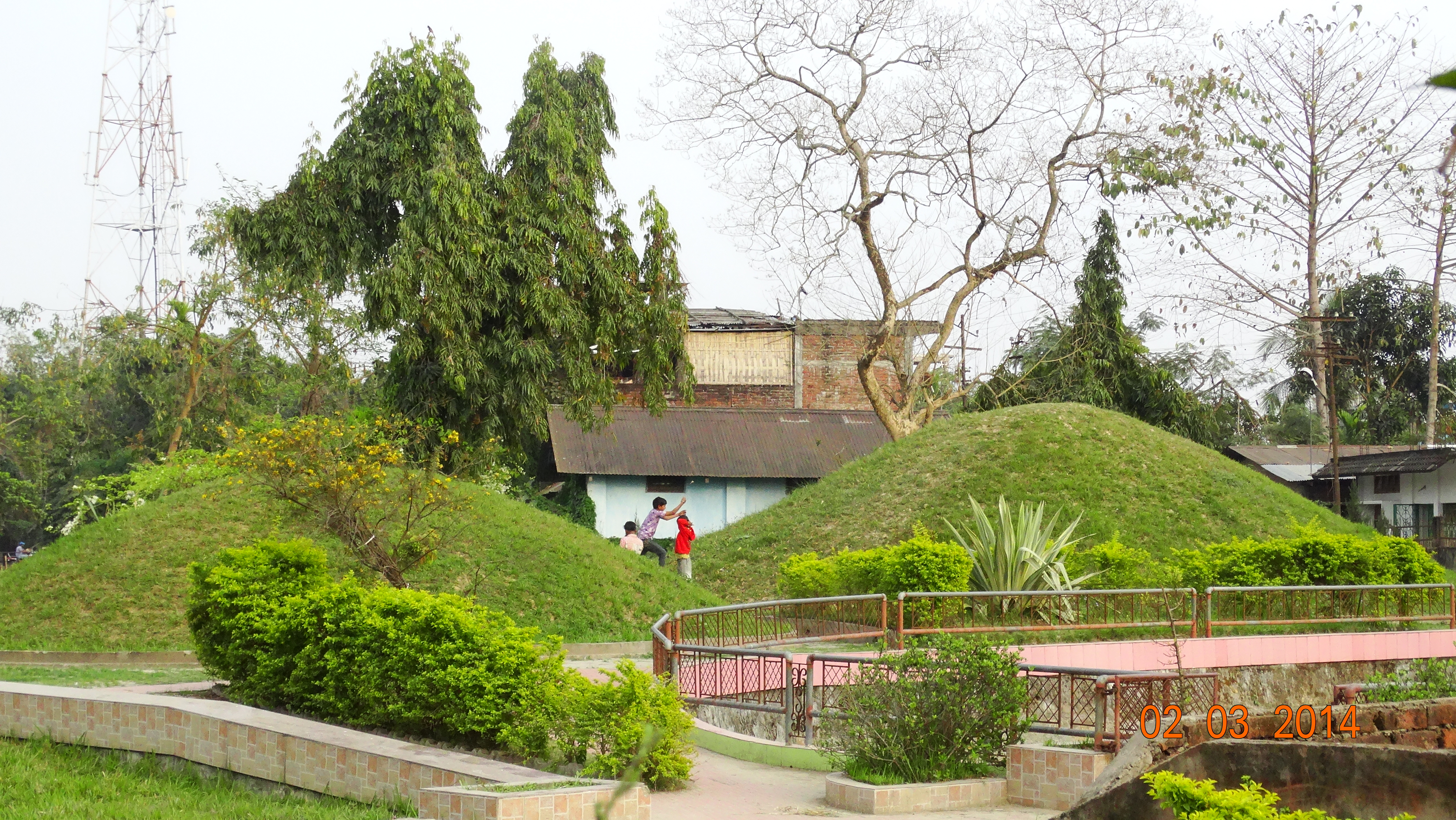
Maidam(burial mound) of the last Ahom King Purandar Singha at Rajamaidam, Jorhat District.

== Family and descendants ==
Purandar Singha had numerous wives; prominent among them were Maharani Chandrakala, Chandrakanti Kunwari and Ambavati Kunwari. Maharani Chandrakala was the Parvatia Queen of Purandar Singha and she was a Manipuri princess. Purandar Singha was succeeded by his son Jubraj Kameswar Singha. In 1847 CE, Kameswar Singha was permitted by the British Government to use the title of Raja. He died on 10 June 1852 CE, and his remains were entombed near his father's tomb, in Raja Maidam, Jorhat. Kameswar Singha left three widows, Rani Lakhipriya, Padmahari Kunwari and Madhavi Maju Kunwari, as well as a concubine named Rupavati Khatania. Kandarpeswar Singha, Kameswar's son with Lakhipriya, was born in 1840.

Purandar Singha's daughter Rupahi Aideo was married to Trinayan Singha. Rupahi was implicated in the anti-British revolt of Maniram Dewan in 1857, and she lost her government pension and forfeited her property.

In 1848 CE, the title of Charing Raja was conferred on Kandarpeswar. During the Indian Rebellion of 1857, he was suspected of disloyalty. He was placed under arrest, with his agent Maniram Dewan Barbhandar Barua who was then in Calcutta petitioning the Governor-General for the restoration of the Ahom kingdom to Kandarpeswar Singha. As a result of the trial, he was sent to Alipur and then to Burdwan to be detained there as a state prisoner. Maniram Dewan was executed on February 26, 1858, CE.

Kandarpeswar was afterwards released and granted a pension of 500 rupees per month; he died in Guwahati. His two sons, Kumudeswar and Nareswar, with his wife Rani Kamalapriya, had died during their father's lifetime, and his daughter Troilokyeswari Aideo survived him.

== Character and legacy ==
Contemporary chroniclers are of the opinion that since Purandar Singha had passed his childhood through economic hardships during his father's exile in Bengal, he was very much attracted to money and wealth. This explains the accusations which he had faced during both of his reigns. During his first reign, Purandar Singha and his father Brajanath Gohain, after being defeated by Burmese, fled to Guwahati taking all the valuables from the Royal treasury worth 3.5 million rupees, due to which the next ruler Chandrakanta Singha faced economic hardship in gathering mercenaries and maintaining the army to fight Burmese. During his second reign, as tributary prince under British, it was found that Purandar Singha was busy gathering personal wealth, instead of taking care of administration, which resulted in the growth of corruption among his officials. Some historians also stated his character as stubborn and firm from the fact that he refused to accept any pensions or grants from British Government. His son, Kameswar Singha also refused to accept pension from the British Government. Some sources said that it was actually Maniram Dewan who advised both father and son not to accept any pension, since it might weaken their petition to restore their kingdom.
