= Kamaleswar Singha =

Nominal Ahom king, ruled 1795–1811

Suklingphaa
- Chaopha/Swargadeo
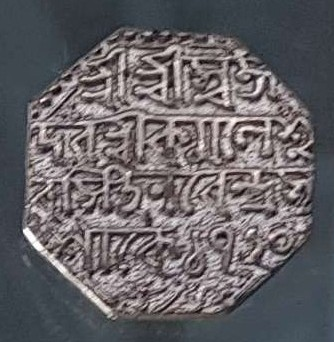
- Coin of Kamaleswar Singha

Ahom King
- Reign: 1795 – 17 January 1811
- Predecessor: Gaurinath Singha
- Successor: Chandrakanta Singha
- Regent: Purnananda Burhagohain
- Born: Kinaram Gohain c.1795 Ahom kingdom
- Died: 17 January 1811 (aged 16); Ahom kingdom
- House: Tungkhungia
- Dynasty: Ahom dynasty
- Father: Kadamdighala Gohain
- Mother: Numali Rajmao
- Religion: Ekasarana Dharma
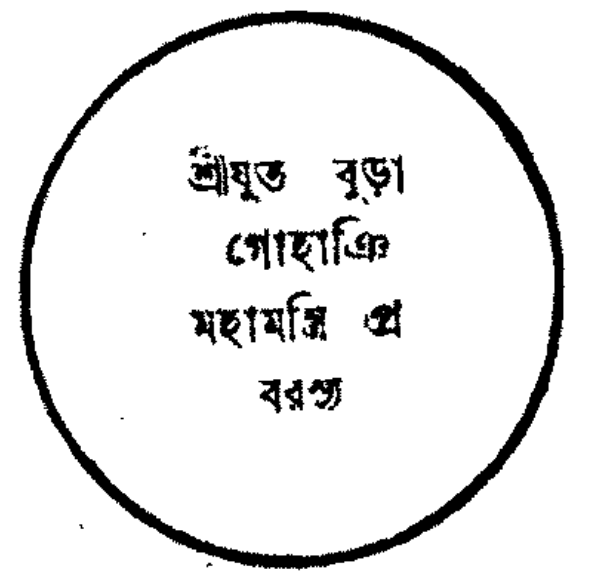
- Royal Seal

Kamaleswar Singha (born Kinaram Gohain; c. 1795 – 17 January 1811), also known as Suklingpha, was Ahom King from 1795 until his death in 1811.

He came to power when he was a toddler, and died in his teens during a small pox epidemic. The de facto ruler during his reign was Purnanada Burhagohain, who was able to consolidate power after installing him on the throne; and his parents Kadamdighala and Numali also were very powerful.

Kamaleswar Singha's reign witnessed the suppression of Moamoria rebellion and restoration of Ahom rule over Upper Assam. The Dundiya Revolution in Kamrup was also suppressed during his reign. In Nagaon, the Ahom army also managed to defeat a coalition of Moamoria rebels and the Kacharis of Kachari Kingdom. Much of this was the handiwork of Purnananda Burhagohain and not Kamaleswar Singha. He died of smallpox, aged 16, and was succeeded by his younger brother, Chandrakanta Singha.

== Ancestry and birth ==
Kinaram was the eldest son of Kadamdighala Gohain and Numali and barely an infant when he became the king. Kadamdighala was the grandson of Lechai Namrupia Raja, the younger son of Supatpha (Gadadhar Singha) and the younger brother of Sukhrungpha (Rudra Singha). Lechai was suspected of conspiracy by his brother-king and was mutilated and banished, but was later re-established. Kadamdighala showed gallantry in an operation again the Moamoria rebels but was not himself eligible to be on the throne since he was mutilated in an eye. Kamaleswar had two siblings, one sister named Maju Aideo and one brother Sudingpha (Chandrakanta Singha), who was born after Kinaram had ascended the throne.

== Accession to the throne ==
Kadamdighala Gohain was holding the titular rank of Charing Raja when in 1795 the reigning monarch Suhitpangpha (Gaurinath Singha) died at Jorhat. Since the king has no heir he entrusted Purnananda Burhagohain to select the next king who raised the elder son of Kadamdighala Gohain, Kinaram Gohain as the new king of the Ahom Kingdom, who was then a mere baby of less than two years old. Kinaram was proclaimed the sovereign of the Ahom Kingdom and was placed on the throne at the Dichoi camp. The Tai-Ahom priests conferred upon him the title Suklingpha. The name 'Kamaleswar Singha' was sent down to Calcutta for being impressed on the coin.

== Reign ==
At the time of Kamaleswar Singha's accession, situation of the country was far from stable. Moamoria rebels were still at large and reports of more revolts in other parts of the country aggravate the situation. Neighbouring hill tribes were conducting frequent raids in the villages in the Brahmaputra valley, threatening peace and security of the common people. Many Assamese people fled to neighboring Cachar, Jaintia and British ruled province of Bengal. Agriculture, trade and commerce came to complete halt. On account of depleted finances of the state, for the first time, the traditional Tai-Ahom ceremony of coronation, the Singarigharutha of Kamaleswar Singha was postponed. Such a ceremony usually cost 400,000 rupees during those days. To make matters worse, the administration was full of corrupt and incompetent officials, who at times also proved their disloyalty towards the central authority, by taking sides with rebels or by declaring their independence from Ahom rule. Prime Minister Purnananda Burhagohain was determined to restore the lost glory of Ahom Kingdom. Immediately after Kamaleswar Singha's accession, the real power behind the throne, Purnananda Burhagohain made a clean sweep of the officials who were opposed to him and appointed his nearest relatives in positions of trust and responsibility, and having done so, devoted all his effort to the restoration of order throughout the country.

=== Remodeling of Ahom Army ===
Prime Minister Purnananda Burhagohain knew that a well-trained, fully armed and regularly paid standing army is very essential to maintain order in the country. During the reign of the previous monarch, Suhitpangpha (Gaurinath Singha), he had witnessed how a small group of disciplined, well-armed and well-trained British troop had defeated large groups of Moamoria rebels. Therefore, remodeling of Ahom army in the line of British troops began during the reign of Gaurinath Singha, which was continued and extended during the reign of Kamaleswar Singha. In 1803 CE, Purnananda Burhagohain dispatched an embassy, consisting of Baloram Khangia Phukan, Bhudhar Chaliha Changkakati, Madhuram Bora, Govindram Sarma Khound and Tanusyam Sarma Khound under the leadership of his son Orekhanath Dhekial Phukan to the Governor-General of British India, Lord Wellesley with formal request to supply a quota of well-trained sepoys and large quantity of arms and weapons The Ahom envoys made over to the Governor-General 2000 gold mohurs (coins) and 10,000 silver rupees as present from the Ahom government to substantiate the request. The supplies solicited by Purnananda Burhagohain were readily granted; and with their help the Ahom army was organised on up-do-date lines. Local Assamese people from Bacha and Dayang regions were recruited in the army and were trained in modern methods of weaponry and warfare with the help of these sepoys from British army. The army was divided into eighteen companies of one hundred soldiers each. Chandra Gohain, a relation of the Premier, was appointed Captain, and he was subsequently raised to the rank of a Major and then Colonel. The commander had under him a gradation of Subedars and Jamadars. Later, detachments of the new force were garrisoned at Guwahati, Jorhat, Sadiya and Mahang.

=== Contributions from the Mahantas ===
In the depleted state of the royal treasury, it was found difficult to provide funds to pay the wages of the sepoys. The Mahantas or Adhikars, the spiritual heads of the Sattras (Vaishnavite religious monasteries) were called upon to assist by contributing sums according to the following scale: rupees 4,000 from every principal Sattra; rupees 400 from a Sattra of intermediate rank; rupees 100 from each of the minor Sattras; and rupees 50 each from still smaller Sattras. The Borbarua summoned the Khataniars or representatives of various Sattras and accordingly ordered them to collect the sum. With the sum thus raised the sepoys were paid their monthly wages.

=== The Dundiya Revolt in Kamrup ===
Meanwhile, serious risings were reported from Kamrup. Popular sources attributes the cause of revolt was maladministration of Badan Chandra Borphukan, the then viceroy of Guwahati as well as Lower Assam. It is said that Badan Chandra Borphukan and his subordinate officers, who were mostly recruited from Upper Assam, use to mock the indigenous ethnic groups of Lower Assam people as Dhekeri (maybe because of their unique dialect) Also they use to heap other insults and humiliations to the Lower Assam people. Some people appeal to the Ahom King and to the Prime Minister Purnananda Burhagohain complaining against Badan Chandra's atrocities. But the Central Ahom administration was more focused in restoring Ahom administration in Upper Assam which was badly affected by Moamoria rebellion and therefore they failed to understand the serious nature of dissatisfaction that was rising among the people of Kamrup against Badan Chandra Borphukan. Two brothers Haradatta Choudhury and Bir Datta Choudhary from Jikeri located in North Kamrup, raised a band of Kacharis, Kaibartas and others, declared themselves independent from Ahom rule. Both were previously officers under Borphukan, the Ahom viceroy at Guwahati. Large number of people flocked to their standard, and nearly the whole of North Kamrup fell into their hands. It is said that the Koch rulers of Cooch Bihar and Bijni secretly aided the rebels, hoping to recover Kamrup from Ahom rulers, which was part of erstwhile Koch Kingdom. Local sources from Kamrup termed the acts of these two brothers as patriotic attempt to free the common people from autocratic administration of Badan Chandra Borphukan, while contemporary Ahom historians and sources mocked these rebels as Dundiyas, which literally mean people who like to quarrel or engaged in petty fights.

Badan Chandra Borphukan was unable suppress the rebellion, and therefore, Purnananda Burhagohain appointed Kalia Bhomora from Sandikai family (one of the prominent Ahom family), as the new Borphukan of Guwahati. Kalia Bhomora Borphukan was an energetic and resourceful man. The rebels were threatening the Ahom garrison in Guwahati and there was no hope of any reinforcements from Purnananda Burhagohain who himself, was engaged in the restoration of Ahom rule in Upper Assam. In this critical hour, Kalia Bhomora Borphukan undertook the task of restoring Ahom rule in Kamrup on his own shoulder. He gathered some mercenaries along with some local levies obtained from the Ahom's vassal rulers, the Rajah of Beltola and Dimarua. With this force, Kalia Bhomora Borphukan crossed the Brahmaputra river, attacked and defeated the rebel forces. Meanwhile, dissension broke out in the rebel camp. Many people of Kamrup were dissatisfied by the overbearing conduct and autocratic leadership of Har Datta Choudhary and his brother Bir Datta Choudhary. The brothers tried to escape, but eventually they were caught and put to a painful death. Some of the mercenaries, who had joined the rank of the rebels, tried to cross over to the southern bank of Brahmaputra under the leadership of two Jamidars Bajusing and Alosing. Kalia Bhomora Borphukan encountered them on the river bank at Kamakhya, in which the rebels were defeated resulting in the death of a large number of mercenaries. The Dundiya revolution in Kamrup came to an end. Having received this intelligence Kamaleswar Singha and the Prime Minister Purnananda Burhagohain was delighted and presented to Kalia Bhomora Borphukan a japi or ethnic Asian conical hat with a peak of gold. The King also conferred upon him the title of Pratap-ballabh, literally, 'one whose friend is valour'.

=== Insurrection of the Dafalas and Moamoria rebels in North bank of Brahmaputra ===
While Kalia Bhomora Borphukan was dealing with the Dundiya rebellion, trouble broke out in another part of Assam. Dafalas, a neighbouring hill tribe of north bank of Brahmaputra, joined hands with the Moamoria rebels and raised the standard of revolt in present-day Sonitpur District. The rebels crossed the river Brahmaputra at Duimuni-sila or Silghat in present-day Nagaon District. Having received this news Bhadari Borbarua sent out three companies of newly trained Ahom army to Silghat. The royal soldiers opened fire at the rebels, inflicting heavy losses. The rebels were defeated and many of them were killed, and others were drowned while trying to get into their boats. A few others were also captured alive; they were subsequently beheaded and their heads were transfixed to spears near the two celebrated rocks of Duimuni Sila as a warning to others. The remaining Dafala-Moamoria rebels fled to the north bank to seek refuge in the forests and hills. Purnananda Burhagohain was unable to continue pursuit for rebels across the river, as he was still engaged in the restoration of order on the south bank of Brahmaputra, and in setting up a stable central administration, which got disrupted during the long civil war.

Meanwhile, the Dafalas- Moamorias rebels in the North Bank were united by one leader name Phofai Senapati. He gathered all his forces at Baskata and then dispatched one Madhuram Bairagi to Bengal to fetch a detachment of sepoys and mercenaries. With the help of these mercenaries the rebels ravaged numerous villages creating an atmosphere of terror among the common people. Prime Minister Purnananda Burhagohain immediately marched towards the rebels with several companies of Ahom army. The King ordered the Dekaphukan, an officer stationed in Guwahati, to cross over to North Bank to aid Purnananda Burhagohain. Dekaphukan's forces were ambushed by the rebels at the bank of Bharali River, however the rebels suffered defeat and they retreated to Baskata. Meanwhile, the Premier crossed to the North Bank, near the present town of Tezpur, and very soon reduced the Dafalas to submission. He proceeded to Goramur where he defeated several rebel bands, killing and capturing many rebel leaders. The Chief rebel leader Phofai Senapati got shot and killed in action. A large number of buffaloes, cows, ornaments and other articles were recovered from the rebels and confiscated to the State. After restoring order in the north bank of Brahmaputra, Prime Minister Purnananda Burhagohain paid his obeisance to the King, and submitted the booty to the Royal treasury.

=== Moamoria insurrection in Chokihat ===
After their recent defeats, the Moamoria fugitives went up and assembled in a body at Chokihat and Soaluguri. They were joined by other Moamoria groups led by Bharathi Raja or Bharat Singha, the self-proclaimed king of Morans and other ethnic Moamorias of Kaibarta, Kachari etc. descent at Rangpur. He was joined by Pitambar Thakur, the Mahanta or the religious head of Moamoria religious sect. The King commanded Prime Minister Purnananda Burhagohain to march against these rebels. The Premier, after collecting necessary quota of men and provisions, proceeded by land and water and fell upon the Moamorias at Chokihat, where fierce fighting took place between the Royalist and the Moamorias. Being unable to hold their ground the Moamorias fled and dispersed by land and water to the east. Their religious head or Mahanta, Pitambar Thakur was captured and put to death, Bharathi Raja managed to escape with some of his followers. Many Moamorias being famished offered their submission to the Premier who settled them at Khutiapota.

=== Death of King's father and appointment of new Borbarua ===
The King's father, Prince Kadam Dighala Charingia Raja, died in 1799 CE at Jorhat. Chandrakanta Gohain, the younger brother of Kamaleswar Singha, was appointed to the rank of Charingia Raja. Meanwhile, Bhadari Borbarua of Sandikai family died in 1800 CE. Therefore, Srinath of Duara family was appointed as the new Borbarua of Ahom Kingdom.

=== Operation against Khamtis ===
The Khamtis belong to the same Shan tribe from which the Ahoms belongs. They migrated to Assam some fifty or sixty years previously, with the permission of the Ahom King, settled themselves in the regions in and around Sadiya. During the reign of the previous monarch Swargadeo Gaurinath Singha, in 1794 CE, due to internal disturbances of the country and weakening central authority of Ahom Monarch, the Khamtis living near the region of Sadiya, raised against Ahom rule and after expelling Sadiya-Khowa Gohain, the Ahom Governor of Sadiya, they established their own rule in Sadiya, reduced the local indigenous Assamese people to slavery. It is said that the Khamtis were aided by other Shan tribes, such as Naras and Phakials, who also migrated to Assam in the later part of Ahom rule. In 1800 CE, Prime Minister Purnananda Burhagohain decided to restore Sadiya for Ahom Kingdom. Meanwhile, Kalia Bhomora Borphukan of Guwahati sent some sepoys, who were trained in European style of warfare and were armed in modern weapons, as reinforcement to Purnananda Burhagohain in Upper Assam. These newly trained and well-armed sepoys were sent against the Khamtis who proved their worth during the battles in hilly terrain by successfully defeating the Khamtis, and reclaimed Sadiya for Ahom Kingdom. The chief of the Khamtis, Burha Raja was captured along with many of his followers. The Khamti prisoners were brought in presence of the Premier, who settled them at the Tokolai forest, while their chief, the Burha Raja was kept under guard near the Capital Jorhat. A new Sadiya-Khowa Gohain was appointed and Ahom rule was restored in Sadiya . The Khamtis did not give any more trouble till the collapse of Ahom rule by Burmese invasion of Assam.

=== Operation against Moran-Singphou rebels and Bharathi Raja ===
In 1801 CE, trouble broke out in Eastern Assam, when Morans, disciples of Moamoria sect of Vaishnavite monastery, raised their heads against Ahom rule. Haripad Dekaphukan of Burhagohain family marched against the rebels with five companies of sepoys and surrounded them at Bengmara. The Morans, unable to stand, fled to Namrup where they were joined by Singphous, a frontier hill tribe. The combine Moran- Singphou army attacked the royalist with renewed strength, however they were beaten back by Haripad Dekaphukan's forces with heavy casualties. The Morans and Singphous formed themselves into two separate groups and dispersed in opposite directions. The spoils obtained from the warfare consisted of men, provisions, buffaloes, cows, copper, brass and cloths. Haripad Dekaphukan returned to the capital Jorhat and bowed to the King. The articles seized in the war were removed to the royal treasury. In the meantime, Moamorias under the leadership of Bharathi Raja, who came out of his hiding, regrouped themselves at Bengmara. Kamaleswar Singha, now, commanded Haripad Dekaphukan to deal with the insurgency caused by Bharathi Raja. Haripad Dekaphukan marched against Bharathi Raja with six companies of sepoys and chased the rebels from their strongholds. The royal army continued their pursuit for rebels and found them out in deep forest. The soldiers surrounded the rebels from all sides. Their leader Bharathi Raja fought bravely until he was hit by rifle shot and later pierced to death by rifle bayonets of Ahom soldiers. Seeing their leader fall, the Moamorias broke and dispersed into the forest. By order of the King the corpse of Bharathi Raja was transfixed to a spear in the midst of the newly settled Moamoria village at Khutiapota. Large numbers of Moamoria and Morans offered their submission to Royal authority and large number of articles and provisions were recovered from them. These successive defeats appear to have convinced the Moamorias of the hopelessness of further resistance, and for several years no further trouble was given by them in Eastern Assam.

=== Excavation of Bhogdoi Canal ===
In order to facilitate the supply of water in the newly established Capital Jorhat, Prime Minister Purnananda Burhagohain excavated a canal extending from Dichoi to the Kalioni. During the excavation of that stream the Adhikars or the head of the religious institutions fed the people with rice and cakes, while the King, the Premier and the Borbarua also supplied refreshments to the labourers. The name 'Bhogdoi', literally means food-offering, was thus given to the canal. Kamaleswar Singha went to see the newly constructed stream, where the nobles honoured him with gifts on a sarai and a taoban. The queen-mother Numali Rajmao also accompanied the King and distributed gifts on that day to women on the way.

=== Panimua's conspiracy ===
Since Swargadeo Kamaleswar Singha was young to manage the affairs of the state, the Prime Minister Purnananda Burhagohain hold supreme power. He dictates and issues all Royal edicts and orders, appoint and dismiss officers at his own will. Dissatisfaction arises among some section of people due to the dictatorship of the Premier. Panimua was a member of the Rati-Khowa sect, or the fraternity of night-worshippers whose creed sanctioned participation in indiscriminate food and in bacchanalian revelry. He misrepresented the actions of the Prime Minister and collected a number of followers with the avowed object of killing the Premier and the King. The conspirators armed themselves with an old rusted cannon which they mounted in the shrubberies in front of Burhagohain's compound. The Premier used to go out with an armed retinue of 240 men. They saw smoke coming out of the bushes and came upon the light-hearted conspirators in the fit of drunkenness. Panimua and his companions were immediately arrested. Panimua divulge the names of all people who were in line with the conspiracy. Almost all the conspirators were arrested. Taking advantage of the situation, Purnananda Burhagohain arrested those entire persons who had incurred his displeasure or wrath in past. He also ordered Srinath Duara Borbarua to inflict death sentence on every such person. These indiscriminate executions would have gone on indefinitely but for the timely intervention of Sibnath Dolakasharia Barua, the brother of Purnananda Burhagohain. Panimua and all his accomplices were executed. This took place in 1803 CE.

=== Efforts to bring back the fugitive cultivators ===
Owing to the disturbances caused by the Moamoria rebellion, many Assamese people seek refuge in neighbouring Kachari and Jaintia kingdoms. After the suppression of Moamoria rebellions by the Royalist, many Moamoria fugitives also seek refuge in these neighbouring kingdoms. Purnananda Burhagohain had been making constant efforts to induce fugitive cultivators to return to their homes. He also offered a free pardon to those who have fought on the rebel side. Many Assamese people returned to their villages, but a large number of Moamoria fugitives, who had taken refuge in Kachari and Jaintia territory, preferred to remain there. This led to a long correspondence with the Kachari and Jaintia rulers, who both declined to drive away their new subjects. The Jaintia controversy appears to have terminated with the ignominious expulsion of any envoy from Jaintia King Ram Singh II, because the letters which he brought were thought to be discourteous, and did not contain the adulatory epithets customary in the intercourse between oriental rulers. The dispute with Kachari king, Krishna Chandra turned from bad to worse, when reports of collaboration between Moamorias and Kacharis came to light. Purnananda Burhagohain was determined to bring back the fugitives and therefore after obtaining permission from the Swargadeo Kamaleswar Singha decided to use force.

=== Moamoria-Kachari disturbances in Nagaon ===
In 1803 CE, Purnananda Burhagohain dispatch a force to recover the fugitives, most of whom appear to have settled in the tract of level country around Dharampur, between the Mikir Hills and the Jamuna River. Meanwhile, the Moamorias assembled at one place with hostile intention. They were joined by the Kacharis from Kachari Kingdom, sent by Kachari king Krishna Chandra. An Ahom prince, Bijoy Barmura Gohain, grandson of Swargadeo Rajeswar Singha joined the rank of the rebels with the intention to become king. Kamaleswar Singha immediately issued orders to the Ahom troops stationed at Guwahati to march against the rebel. The troops from Guwahati united with the troops sent by Purnananda Burhagohain from Jorhat and assembled at Roha-Chowki. After uniting their strength, the Ahom force launched offensive against the combine force of Moamorias and the Kacharis at Jamunamukh and successfully defeated them. The enemy, however, quickly rallied, and took to raiding and burning villages near present-day Nagaon town. Meanwhile, a number of villages joined the rank of rebels, thereby greatly increasing their strength. Unaware of such developments, the Ahom army crossed the Kalang and Kapili River with the intention to attack the enemy. Instead, the Ahom force was ambushed and there ensued a severe battle between both sides. Finally supplies ran out of Ahom forces, and they were forced to retreat with a loss of 540 men and many guns. After this victory, the Moamorias came out and compelled the people to offer submission to them in the area bounded by the Kajali, the Brahmaputra and the mouth of the Micha river. Some of the chieftains of Lalung or Tiwa tribal community of present-day Marigaon District, whom the Ahom referred as Raja Powalis or subordinate kings also joined the rank of the rebels, with the intention to rise against Ahom rule.

On hearing of this reverse, the Prime Minister Purnananda Burhagohain called in the troops stationed in the eastern districts and sent them with fresh levies to renew the conflict. Kamaleswar Singha sent Chandra Gohain, the Captain of newly trained Ahom army and Bacha Rajkhowa to Nagaon, with men and provisions to strengthen the position of the Ahom army. Another Ahom officer, Hao Sagar Bora also joined the royal forces with his men. The Ahom army pitched their camp at Khagarijan near Nagaon town in the north bank of Kalang. The Moamorias and the Kacharis, emboldened by their previous victory crossed the Kalang river and set fire to the villages, who were still loyal to the Ahom King. The royal troops attacked the coalition force of Moamorias and Kacharis and inflicted heavy casualties on the enemy forces. The entire force of Moamorias and Kacharis fled the battlefield and entered into the territory of Kachari Kingdom. On hearing the message of victory of Ahom forces, Kamaleswar Singha became delighted and rewarded the messengers with presents.

Meanwhile, after their recent defeat, the Moamorias and the Kacharis started to regroup their forces within Kachari Kingdom. Anticipating trouble, Kamaleswar Singha, with the consultation of Prime Minister Purnananda Burhagohain, sent Haripad Dekaphukan, a veteran army commander, to the Moamoria-Kachari war in Nagaon with five companies of sepoys. The King also commanded the transfer of a portion of army stationed at Guwahati to the main theatre of war. Haripad Dekaphukan proceeded down by land and water and joined Chandra Gohain, the Captain and Bacha Rajkhowa at Roha-Chowki. Meanwhile, the Raja of Darrang came with two thousand soldiers, while Lakshmi Narayan Brahmachari, the Duariya Barua of Hadirachowki also came to the battle scene with five companies of soldiers. The newly arrived reinforcements were halted at Jagi-chowki in present-day Marigaon District. After making elaborate planning and preparation, Haripad Dekaphukan decided to conduct operations against the Moamorias and the Kacharis. Meanwhile, the Kacharis and the Moamorias burnt down peaceful villages on the banks of Kapili river. Haripad Dekaphukan set up his headquarters at Narikalguri and Chang-chowki and successfully suppressed the insurrection in those regions. But the rebels again appeared at Bebejia and Khagarijan. They were aided by Lalungs or Tiwa community people and local militia. The Bacha Rajkhowa marched against the rebel and halted at Birah-Bebejia. The rebels burned down the villages of Pathari, Potani-sija and Bheleuguri. Haripad Dekaphukan immediately came to the scene of battle and successfully chased the rebels from the regions. The Ahom army marched to Tetelikhana and afterward to Dabaka, from whence they proceeded to a fort on the bank of the Jamuna river. Meanwhile, the combine force of Moamorias and the Kacharis had advanced from Barthal to the village Demera. A quarrel then ensued between the Moamorias and the Kacharis, and some of the Kacharis abandoned the rank of Moamorias and offered their submission to the Ahom forces. Haripad Dekaphukan seized this opportunity, and escorted the Kacharis to Birah-Bebejia near the Kalang river where they were properly established. Haripad Dekaphukan started chasing the enemy force to permanently crush their resistance, however the enemy avoided to give any battle to the royal force. This hide and seek game continued for days, until one day, the royal forces unexpectedly came in face-to-face to combine force of Moamorias and Kacharis at the mouth of the Kalang river. There ensued a fierce battle between both sides, in which the combine force of Moamoria and Kacharis was decisively defeated. Many enemy soldiers were killed or wounded, while a large number of them were taken prisoner. Some of them again fled to the territories of Kachari Kingdom. This time, Haripad Dekaphukan chased the fugitives and entered into the territory of Kachari Kingdom. He captured a large number of Moamoria rebels, Kachari people and Assamese refugee, who fled the Ahom Kingdom during Moamoria rebellion and later settled them in Nagaon District. He also captured four Chieftains or Raja Powalis of Tiwa or Lalung community who were helping the Moamoria rebels and later put them to death along with other rebel leaders. Barmura Gohain, the Ahom prince who collaborates with the Moamoria rebels fled to Bengal, while other Moamoria leaders fled to Khaspur and Jaintiapur. Thus, the Kachari-Moamoria war in Nagaon came to an end in 1805 CE. During that time, Haripad Dekaphukan got news from his family in Jorhat that his wife gave birth to a son. Delighted, by this news and also with a desire to commemorate his victory in Kachari-Moamoria war, Haripad Dekaphukan, named his son as Ranonjoy, which literally mean victor of battles.

Kamaleswar Singha was extremely pleased when he receives the intelligence of victory and suppression of rebels in Nagaon. He granted a khat or estate of 2000 pura of land (1 pura= 4 bighas of lands) in the Nagaon District to the victorious General Haripad Dekaphukan as reward for his services. The estate is known as Dekaphukanar Khat.

=== Moamoria rising in the East ===
In 1805 CE, there was a fresh rising of Moran Moamorias east of the Dibru river, whose chief, Sarbananda Singha, the self-proclaimed king of Morans, established himself at Bengmara. To govern his territory, like Ahom kings, Sarbananda called himself as Swargadeo and also appointed a Borbarua whose name was Ramnath. Kamaleswar Singha immediately called his veteran general Haripad Dekaphukan to suppress the rebellion in the east. Haripad Dekaphukan was accompanied by other veteran generals of Kachari-Moamoria war. They were Chandra Gohain or Captain Gohain, the Bacha Rajkhowa, Hao Sagar Bora and Bhiturual Phukan (officer in charge of inner chambers of Royal Palace), along with five companies of sepoy and other soldiers from different regions. Haripad Dekaphukan crossed the Dibru river and attacked the rebels at Bhutiating or Bahatiating. The rebels were defeated and they beat a hasty retreat to Holongaguri or Solongaguri. The Ahom army besieged the enemy there. After some time, monsoon arrives and heavy rain then set in. Nearly one thousand Morans died of fever, dysentery and scarcity of food. Many Morans came out and offered their submission while Sarbananda Singha and his companions escaped. Due to heavy rainfall, it was impossible to conduct any military operation during monsoon season, therefore Haripad Dekaphukan crossed the Dibru river with the captured Morans and settled them at Ghilamara, where he posted one company of sepoys to watch the captives. Meanwhile, Sarbananda Singha sent his minister Ramnath Borbarua to Burma to solicitate military aid from the Burmese monarch. At first, the Burmese monarch paid no attention to these requests, but later, he yielded and parties of Burmese twice brought into the country. On both occasions, however they were won by the agents of the watchful Purnananda Burhagohain.

Next year, 1806 CE, another expedition was sent by Prime Minister Purnananda Burhagohain to fully crush the rebellion by Morans led by Sarbananda Singha. The Morans, after getting defeated, escaped into deep forest. Frustrated by his repeated failures, Sarbananda finally sought peace with the Ahom King. Since onset of monsoon will make further military operations impossible, Prime Minister Purnananda Burhagohain relaxed his severity towards Sarbananda and his follower Morans. He gave Sarbananada the title of Barsenapati and allowed him to administer the Moran people who lived in the tract between the Brahmaputra river and the Burhidihing river, as a subordinate ruler of Matak rajya under the Ahom Monarch, in exchange of yearly tribute of 10,000 rupees. Thus in 1806 CE, the Moamoria rebellion finally came to an end during the reign of Swargadeo Kamaleswar Singha.

The following years of Kamaleswar Singha were marked by peace and prosperity, except some minor inroads of Naga tribes in Plains, which were readily suppressed, and four Naga Chautangs or headmen came to Barhat with tributes and offered their allegiance to the Ahom Monarch.

=== Foreign relations ===
==== Envoys from Mungkang ====
In 1800 CE, the King of Mungkang located in Upper Burma sent his envoy Panchamru with letters and presents. The envoy of Mungkang came by the route through Mahang, arrived at Jorhat in time. Following the customs of his predecessors, Kamaleswar Singha received the ambassador of Mungkang at Ranghar, wearing a turban and a cloak. Two platforms were erected on the two sides of the hall, which were occupied the Ahom nobles and officers, according to their rank and statues. After the formal reception of the envoy, the objectives of the letter were disclosed before the King, in which friendly relations with Ahom King was desired by the King of Mungkang. Kamaleswar Singha also sent gifts and letters with cordial message in the hands of the envoy of Mungkang and sent them to the King of Mungkang.

In 1805 CE, the King of Mungkang sends his envoys seeking military assistance from the Ahom King. The envoys informed that the King of Mungkang had lost his kingdom after his defeat in the hands of the Burmese and was living as fugitive in China. It is not known what was the reply from Ahom side to that request but one can presume that the Ahom King must have politely refused to send any military assistance due to the lack of man-power and internal disturbances caused by Moamoria rebellion.

==== Relations with Bhutan ====
During the Moamoria rebellion, the Bhutias took many Assamese as prisoners and reduced them to slavery. During the disorders following that rebellion, Bhutan plains and hills became refuge of the rebels of various classes. As a result, relation with Ahom King with the Bhutias became strained. In 1801, the Purbaparia Chaudhari Brahman named Pankaj, and the Lekharu of Kharang named Kapchiga, was dispatched by Kalia Bhomora Borphukan of Guwahati to Deva-Dharma Raja, the ruler of Bhutan. The envoys were received most cordially and the ruler of Bhutan, Deva Dharma Raja then sent with them four Jinkaps or envoys named Jiva, Dindu, Khuoa and Barukdewa to Swargadeo Kamaleswar Singha with gifts and letters. The Bhutan Government however complained of raids on the Bhutias across the Gohain Kamala Ali, the traditional boundary with Bhutan. On enquiry, it was found that it was the Bhutias who had encroached on Ahom territory during the Moamoria rebellion.

=== Darrang affairs ===
In 1805 CE, Krishnanarayan, the tributary ruler of Darrang under Ahom, who failed to prevent Bhutia encroachment, was immediately summoned to the capital Jorhat. At the Biali-Mel or evening conference in the Royal Audience Hall, Srinath Duara Borbarua tried Krishnanarayan for his failure to prevent the Bhutia encroachment in the territories of Assam and his failure to protect the Assamese people living in the border regions with Bhutan, as a gross negligence of duty on his part. Krishananarayan was found guilty and he was deposed with immediate effect. His relative Sumudranarayan was appointed as the new king of Darrang in Royal Audience hall at Jorhat in presence of Swargadeo Kamaleswar Singha and the new king pledge his allegiance to the Ahom Monarch. Kamaleswar Singha presented Sumudranarayan with gifts and instructed Sumudranarayan to push the Bhutias back to the original border between the two countries.

=== Majiu Aideo's marriage ===
In order to strengthen the relation between the Royal House of Tungkhungia and the Kuoigayan Burhagohain family of Purnananda Burhagohain, in December, 1805 CE, Majiu Aideo, the younger sister of Swargadeo Kamaleswar Singha was given marriage to the second son of Purnananda Burhagohain. The marriage symbolizes the union of the Royal House of Tungkhungia and the Kuoigayan Burhagohain family. With this marriage, the influence of Prime Minister Purnananda Burhagohain over the Royal family increased and his respect over other Ahom nobles of Ahom Kingdom also rises.

=== Proposal to convert Assam into a feudatory state under the British ===
Kalia Bhomora Borphukan, the Ahom viceroy of Western Assam, was a farsighted statesman and a capable general. With his knowledge of the outside world, he realized that the association of British East India Company was the only possible remedy for counteracting the grave situation into which the Ahom Kingdom had been plunged. He submitted formal proposals to the Prime Minister Purnananda Burhagohain to negotiate with the British East India Company to become a tributary to the British Government, following the example of other kingdoms of the rest of India, especially the neighbouring kingdom of Koch Bihar. The proposal was discussed with all the leading nobles of the Ahom Kingdom, but it was rejected, as it was thought that it would be very unpopular with the people, who would disliked the idea of giving up the independence of the country to some foreign power. Purnananda Burhagohain had firm faith in his own powers and capability and rejected the proposal of Kalia Bhomora Borphukan as being pessimistic and premature.

=== Appointment of Badan Chandra as new Borphukan ===
Few days later the popular and capable Kalia Bhomora Borphukan died in Guwahati. In his place, the previous Borphukan, Badan Chandra was appointed as the new Borphukan, who was very much disliked by the people of Lower Assam because of the notorious acts of his and his two sons Janmi and Piyali. Meanwhile, to secure his position, Badan Chandra had established firm relationship with the Prime Minister Purnananda Burhagohain by giving his daughter Pijou Gabhora, to Orekhanath Dhekial Phukan, one of the sons of Purnananda Burhagohain. The appointment of Badan Chandra to the post of Borphukan would prove fatal to both Purnananda Burhagohain and to the future of Ahom Kingdom in days to come.

=== Works of public utility ===
The period of stability and peace that ushered during the reign of Kamaleswar Singha, allowed the King and his minister to turn their attention towards the fulfilling of the civic and religious obligations of the state. Temples were erected at Chatrakar and Kamakhya at Guwahati with the usual endowments of lands and paiks for their perpetual maintenance. Jorhat having now assumed full-fledged metropolis, several approaching roads were constructed connecting the city with the interior villages. New villages were erected at Jorhat. Operations for catching elephants were instituted in a village at a distance of six miles east of Jorhat. One hundred and twenty elephants were captured and the village was henceforth known as Hatigarh.

Kolia_Bhomora_Setu
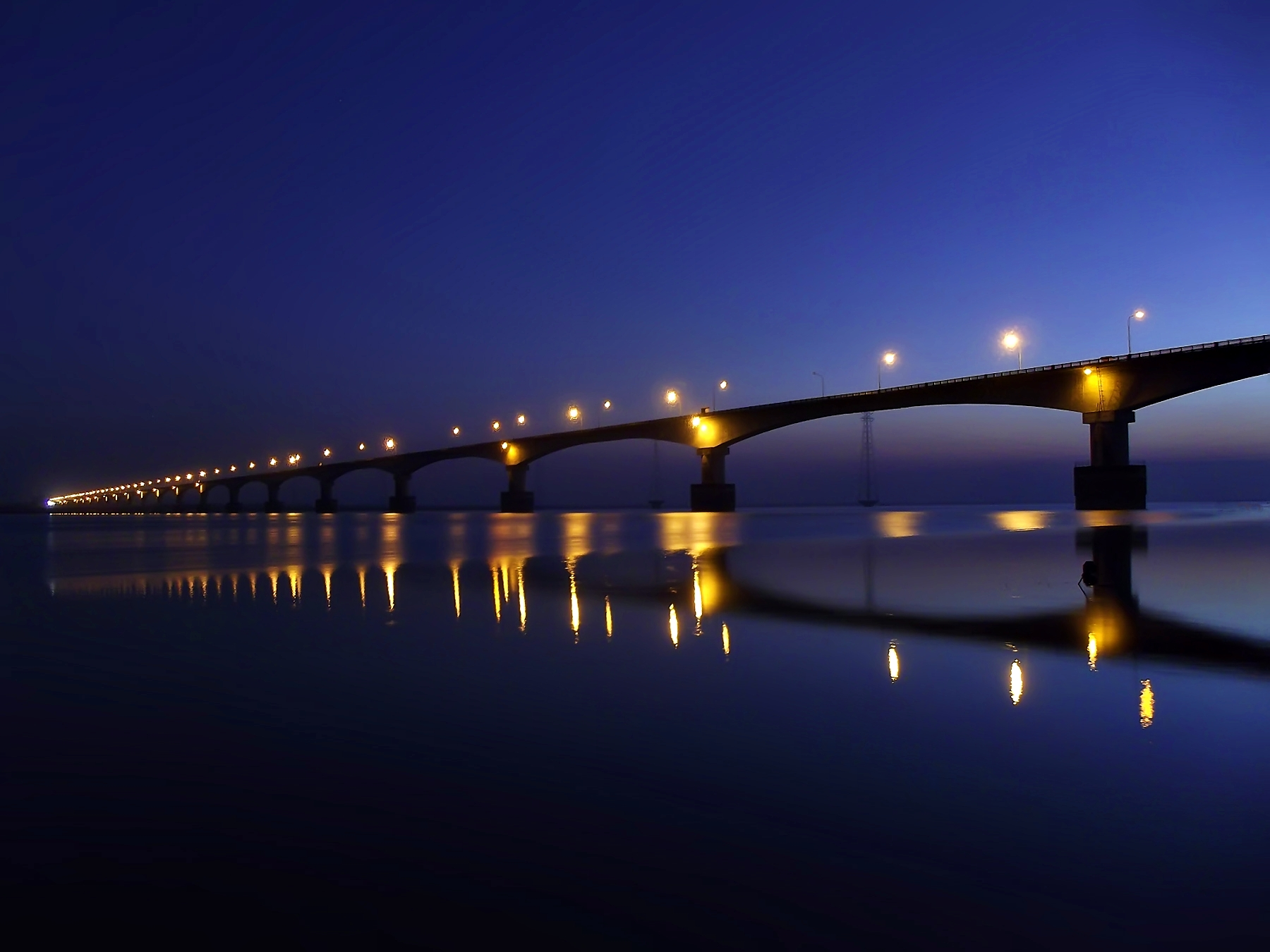
- The bridge at the night time

Kolia Bhomora Borphukan planned to construct a bridge over the Brahmaputra River at hills of Bhomoraguri, east of Tezpur town. All the building materials were collected at the building site, but unfortunately Kolia Bhomora Borphukan died while the construction work was at progress. After independence from British rule, the Government of India constructed a bridge over Brahmaputra River, at the same site and named the bridge after this great Ahom general and statesman, known as Kolia Bhomora Setu.

=== Administrative works ===
Chhatrakar Debalay, Kamakhyar (Silghat) Tamar Ghar, Hayagriv Madhav Debalay, Bahar Guri Debalaya, Cheuni Pukhuri, Mahebandha Ali, Kamarbandha Ali, Chuchande Bandha Ali.

=== Works on literature ===
Kamaleswar Singha and Purnananda Burhagohain were patrons of letters, and Srikanta Suryya-bipra translated under their auspices, the Lanka-kanda of the Ramayana into beautiful Assamese verse. The queen-mother Numali Rajmao also compiled the famous Hitopadesh by a scholar named Bagish Bhattarcharya, in order to teach young King Kamaleswar Singha and his younger brother Chandrakanta Gohain, the ethics required to rule a country- a fact unfortunately symbolizing the last phase of Ahom supremacy in Assam.

=== Death ===
In January 1811 CE, there broke out a severe epidemic of smallpox in Jorhat and the neighbouring villages. The people were seized with a dire panic, and they refrained from visiting the houses of their friends, relatives and neighbours. The young King Kamaleswar Singha died of this disease. He was only sixteen years old at the time of his death. He was succeeded by his brother Chandrakanta Gohain, who will be crowned as the Sovereign of Ahom Kingdom as Chandrakanta Singha.

== Character and legacy ==
Kamaleswar Singha was very mild natured, kind-hearted person. He was aware that the country was going through critical phase and he should co-operate with the Prime Minister Purnananda Burhagohain in dealing with the problems of the state. Therefore, he offered his full support to the policies of Purnananda Burhagohain, which proved very beneficial for the kingdom. The power of Moamoria rebels was broken and the country experienced relatively peace and prosperity during his reign. The credit of the successful reign of Kamaleswar Singha actually goes to the Prime Minister Purnananda Burhagohain, who took control of the state's administration, since the king was minor at the time of his accession, and successfully performed all his duties towards the country. He successfully suppressed the Moamoria Rebellion and he recalled most of the Assamese fugitive cultivators, who fled the country during Moamoria Rebellion and was successful in settling them back in the Ahom Kingdom. He successfully reconstructed the towns and villages of Upper Assam, which were devastated by rebels, and was successful in establishing Jorhat as the Capital of Ahom Kingdom. He also excavated the Bhogdoi canal to facilitate the water supply for the citizens of Jorhat. He organized the first regular Ahom army, which was paid on regular basis, trained in European Warfare and armed with modern weapons. The modern Ahom army successfully suppressed the Moamoria rebels, beat back the incursions of hill tribes and Kacharis. The power of Ahom Kingdom revived and the respect for Ahom Monarchy was restored among the people of Assam.

== See also ==
- Ahom Kingdom
- Ahom Dynasty
- Singarigharutha ceremony
- Kachari Kingdom
- Jaintia Kingdom
- British East India Company
- Tezpur
- Nagaon district
- Kamrup district
- Chirang district
- Koch Bihar
- Bijni
- History of Beltola
