= Ruchinath Burhagohain =

Prime Minister of the Ahom Kingdom

Prime Minister of the Ahom Kingdom
- In office 1818–1819
- Monarch: Purandar Singha
- Preceded by: Badan Chandra Borphukan
- In office March 1817
- Monarch: Chandrakanta Singha
- Preceded by: Purnananda Burhagohain
- Succeeded by: Badan Chandra Borphukan

Personal details
- Children: 2
- Parent: Purnananda Burhagohain (father)
- Relatives: Ghanashyam Burhagohain (grandfather)

Ruchinath Burhagohain (fl. 1817–1822) was an Ahom statesman who served as prime minister of the Ahom Kingdom briefly in 1817 and again from 1818 to 1819. A member of the Kuoigayan family, he was the son of Purnananda Burhagohain and grandson of Ghanashyam Burhagohain.

He was instrumental in the deposition of Chandrakanta Singha and the accession of Purandar Singha to the throne. After the second Burmese invasion of Assam led to his fall from power, he fled to Chilmari and later Calcutta. He was put under house-arrest in January 1822 for an alleged conspiracy, and disappeared from the historical record shortly afterwards.

== Ancestry ==
Ruchinath Burhagohain was the son of Purnananda Burhagohain and grandson of Ghanashyam Burhagohain.

== First premiership (1817) ==
After the death of his father Purnananda, Ruchinath forcibly succeeded his father as Burhagohain (prime minister) under king Chandrakanta Singha. At the time of his appointment, the Burmese army under king Bodawpaya and Badan Chandra Borphukan had invaded Assam. The Ahom council decided to continue the war and a fresh army was sent to resist the Burmese, but was defeated. As the Burmese continued their advance to Jorhat, Ruchinath advised the king to leave Jorhat and retreat to lower Assam. The king refused the request, which caused Ruchinath to think that the king was in alliance with Borphukan. Ruchinath subsequently collected all the valuables, and fled westwards with all his family to Guwahati.

== Return to power ==
=== Background ===
After the invasion of the Burmese army, Chandrakanta Singha was retained as king by Badan Chandra Borphukan; Borphukan was appointed the prime minister, and the Burmese army left Assam in April 1817. Borphukan then became the de facto ruler of the kingdom until the queen-mother, Numali Rajmao and other officials hatched a conspiracy to assassinate Badan Chandra Borphukan. After Borphukan's assassination, Chandrakanta Singha invited Ruchinath to return to Jorhat as prime minister, but Ruchinath was unable to forgive the monarch for setting up Borphukan against his father and entering an alliance with the Burmese.

=== Invasion ===
Ruchinath asked his brother, Jagannath Dhekial Phukan, to proceed to Rangpur to invite 10-year-old prince Purandar to become king. The prince's father, Brajanath Gohain, refused to allow Purandar travel to Guwahati in hopes that he himself would become king, despite his disqualification due to his mutilation. Ruchinath and Jagannath disregarded their objections to Brajanath's claim to kingship for the time being ad his cooperation was expected to be more effective than his 10-year-old son.

After gathering their army, Ruchinath and Brajanath marched to Jorhat, which caused to Chandrakanta flee to Rangpur. Luku Dekaphukan was then left in charge to defend Jorhat, but resistance under him was defeated and the Dekaphukan was killed. Ruchinath and Brajanath were successful in convincing royalist troops to join their cause. They entered Jorhat in February 1818, and on 20 February Chandrakanta Singha was deposed and Purandar Singha was proclaimed as king. A few days later, Chandrakanta Singha had had his right ear sliced off by Biswanath Gohain, to try to disqualify him from the throne.

== Fall from power (1819) ==
In response to the murder of Borphukan and the deposition of Chandrakanta Singha, King Bodawypaya launched an army of 20,000 men under the command of Kiamingi, guided by Momai Barua, to invade Assam in January 1819. After engagements between the Burmese army and forces led by Jagannath Dhekial Phukan, the Phukan urged the royalist leaders to flee Jorhat and go westwards. Ruchinath and Purandar subsequently took everything from the royal treasures, and sailed to Guwahati with their families.

Momai Barua was sent to seize Purandar and Ruchinath, and after defeating forces of Ruchinath in Nowgong, the Burmese troops arrived at Guwahati on 11 June 1819. The Burmese approached the town on the eastern entrance, and having found themselves surrounded, Purandar and Ruchinath fled to Assam choky on 17 June (opposite Goalpara). After continued pursuit by the Burmese, Ruchinath and Purandar retreated to Chilmari.

== Later activities ==
Purandar and Ruchinath remained at Chilmari until October 1818, and were accompanied by 10 or 15 thousand Assamese people seeking refuge in the British territories.

=== Petitions to the British ===
Ruchinath travelled to Calcutta with 500 attendants and on 27 December 1819 submitted two petitions to Governor General Lord Hastings in which he requested to inform the Burmese government of the defective title of Chandrakanta, and also asked for 2,000 muskets to "preserve the country of Assam to us". He also stated in his petitions "I, the Buragohain, am supreme over the country and its affairs. My possession is but a small portion; still I am master of the government of one kingdom." He also stated that "I am Buragohain, supreme in the province and over them [the three Gohains]. Nothing improper has yet been done by us in the province of Assam, else what prohibition has there been to myself taking the name of Raja, I being supreme in the district?" He also pointed out the illegitimacy of Kamaleswar Singha and Chandrakata, given theor ancestor Lechai rebelled against Rudra Singha, and as such all his descendants were supposed to be barred from succession. The British government response was that they had a policy of non-interference in foreign states, but the Governor General assured Purandar and Ruchinath that they would not be denied asylum in company territory as long as they were peaceful.

=== Downfall and arrest ===
Ruchinath continued to live at Calcutta until June 1821, while Chandrakanta sent proposals for Ruchinath to return to help defeat the third Burmese invasion of Assam. The British government eventually permitted the return of Ruchinath and other refugees to Assam. Ruchinath approached British official Dvid Scott requesting permission to enter Assam to help Chandrakanta Singha on 19 November 1821, but soon after Scott suspected that Ruchinath actually intended to betray Chandrakanta and support Jogeswar Singha instead. He received messages from Assamese representatives of Tilwa and Faja Chydung, which Ruchinath allegedly feared would expose his duplicity. Ruchinath was alleged to have seized the letters and concealed the messengers on a boat, but Scott learned about this through a spy in the camp of Ruchinath, and a police investigation supported this claim. In January 1822, Scott placed Ruchinath under restraint at his boat in Rangpur. It was proposed that Ruchinath be sent to Chandrakanta, but the British feared this would ultimately condemn Ruchinath to death.

Ruchinath was under house-arrest on 7 August 1822, but his future career after this is unmentioned in historical records.

== Family and descendants ==
Ruchinath had two sons, Mahidhar and Bangali.

Ruchinath was the third of four-consecutive generations of prime ministers consisting of: Ghanashyam, Purnananda, Ruchinath and Mahidhar.

== See also ==
- Ahom kingdom
- Burhagohain
- Borgohain
