= Burmese invasions of Assam =

Burmese invasions of Assam between 1817 and 1826

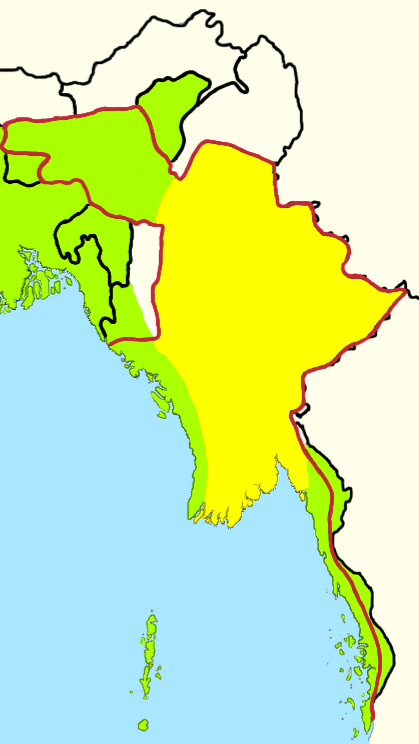
- The red border line is the territories of Konbaung Dynasty before First Anglo-Burmese War which included Occupied Assam
Date	1817–1826
Location	Ahom kingdom
Result	Rapid breakdown of Ahom state.
Territorial changes	Burmese occupation of the Ahom kingdom

Belligerents
Konbaung dynasty	Ahom Kingdom

Commanders and leaders
(Konbaung dynasty) Bodawpaya (Konbaung dynasty) Bagyidaw (Konbaung dynasty) Maha Bandula (Konbaung dynasty) Maha Thilwa (Konbaung dynasty) Ala Mingi (Konbaung dynasty) Bisa Duwa Chyauhpa Nong (Konbaung dynasty) Daihpa Duwa Gam (Naymyo Theinpa Raja)	Chandrakanta Singha; Purandar Singha; Ruchinath Burhagohain; Purnanada Burhagohain; Jaganath Dhekial Phukan

Strength
	Unknown

There were three Burmese invasions of Assam between 1817 and 1826, during which time the Kingdom of Assam came under the control of Burma from 1821 to 1825. Locally, this period, called the manor din (Assamese: "The days/period of the Burmese") by the people of Assam, is remembered with horror. The sharp drop in population due both to depredations as well emigrations left the erstwhile kingdom in shambles. It was the climactic period of the Ahom kingdom. The contemporaneous Chahi Taret Khuntakpa is remembered similarly in Manipur. The British, who were earlier reluctant to colonise Assam, came into direct contact with a belligerent Burmese occupying force. Following the First Anglo-Burmese War they annexed Assam and took Manipur as a subsidiary state.

== Background ==
In the later part of 18th century, the Ahom kingdom in Assam was wreaked by series of rebellions. The Moamoria rebellion in Upper Assam and the Dundiya rebellion in Western Assam severely weakened the Ahom kingdom due to loss of lives and property. The Prime Minister Purnananda Burhagohain tried his best to reestablish Ahom rule over the regions. With great efforts, he finally suppressed all the rebellions, and firmly established the royal authority over the kingdom. For smooth functioning of administration or to consolidate his power, he appointed all his relatives in high posts of the Kingdom of Ahom. Badan Chandra Borphukan, the governor of Guwahati, was anxious of the growing power of Purnananda Burhagohain. At first, he tried to make friendship with Purnananda Burhagohain. He gave his daughter Pijou Gabhoru to Purnananda's son, Oreshanath Dhekial Phukan along with a huge amount of gold ornaments and utensils as dowry. The move backfired when Purnananda Burhagohain expressed his displeasure and suspected Badan Chandra Borphukan of misusing his office. Angered by the behaviour of Purnananda Burhagohain, Badan Chandra Borphukan encouraged conspirators in the capital Jorhat with the aim to assassinate Purnananda Burhagohain. The conspiracy failed and the conspirators were punished. The alleged link of Badan Chandra Borphukan with the conspirators got revealed.

Meanwhile, the people of Western Assam, complained Burhagohain about the atrocities committed by Badan Chandra Borphukan and his two sons, Janmi and Piyoli. Finally in 1815 CE, Purnananda Burhagohain decided to act and he send a deputation with orders to arrest Badan Chandra Borphukan and bring him to the capital Jorhat for justice. Pijou Gabhoru, the daughter-in-law of Purnananda Burhagohain, who was also the daughter of Badan Chandra Borphukan, sent an early message to her father, warning him of the impending danger. Warned by his daughter, Badan Chandra Borphukan escaped to Bengal, which was under British rule. Burhagohain's men caught him at Chilmari in Bengal, but he again escaped with the help of local Thanedar or Police officer. He went to Calcutta and visited the Governor General Lord Hastings with the plea for help to oust Purnananda Burhagohain. The Governor-General declined his plea stating their Policy of Non-interference in the internal matter of another kingdom. Around that time, Badan Chandra Borphukan met the envoy of Burmese King Bodawpaya, who was on a visit at Calcutta. The envoy, after hearing his plea took him to Burma and fixed an appointment with Bodawpaya.

== First Burmese invasion ==
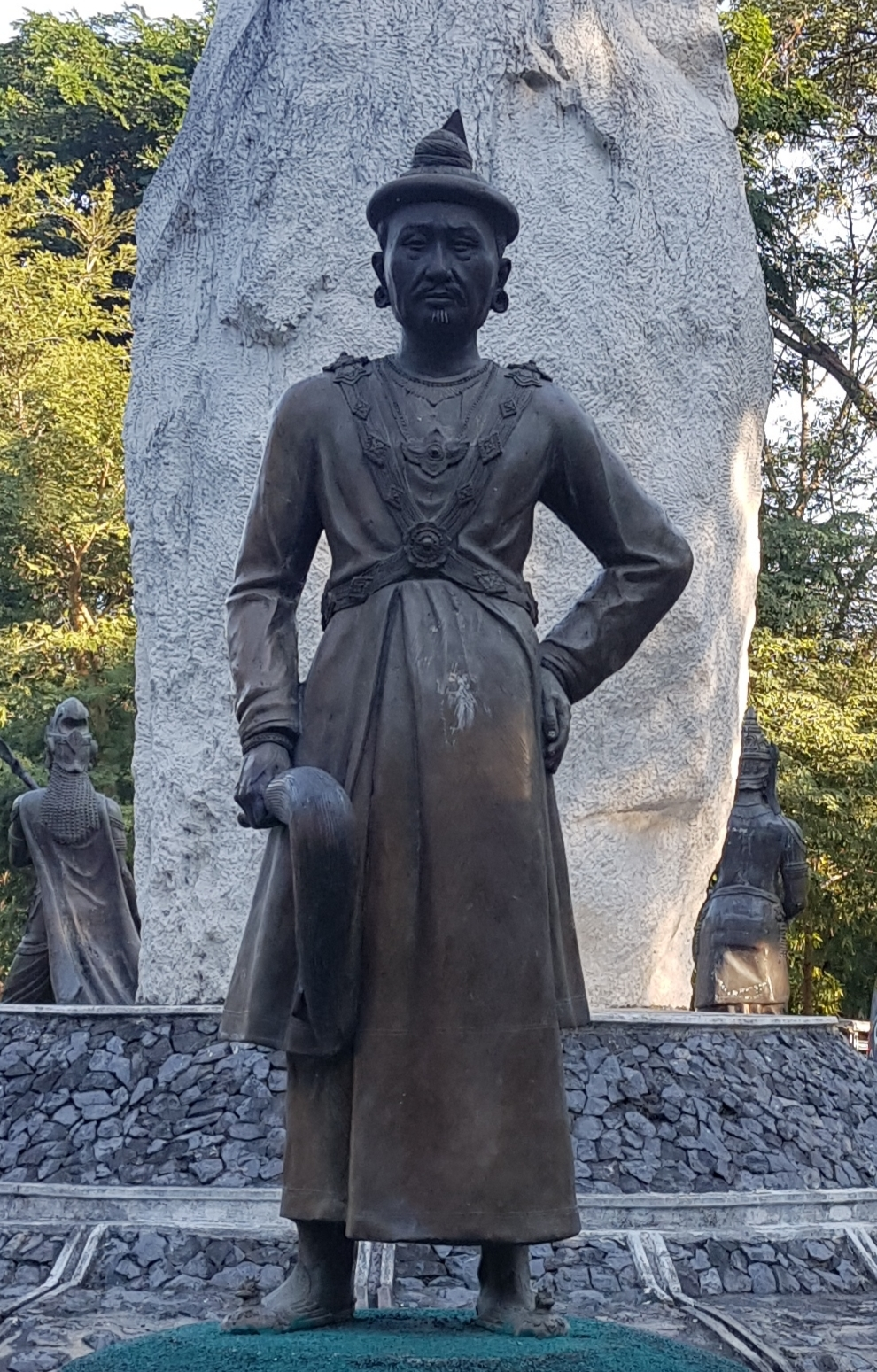
Bodawpaya, the King of Burma who send forces to Assam under Badan Chandra Borphukan

In 1816, Badan Chandra Borphukan came to the court of Burmese King Bodawpaya and sought help to defeat his political rival Purnanada Burhagohain. The Burmese monarch agreed and send an expedition under a general of Bhamo, with Badan Chandra Borphukan which entered Assam in January 1817. The first battle took place on March 27, 1817, at Ghiladhari. The Assam forces were led by Daman Gogoi, Hau Bora and Jama Khan. The battle continued for a week when Purnananda Burhagohain learned that the enemy was accompanied by Badan Chandra Borphukan. This enraged the Burhagohain so much that he collapsed and died. This, according to chronicles, led to the division in the ranks of the Ahom nobility, and due to lack of reinforcements the Assam army surrendered. Ruchinath, the son of Purnananda, became the Burhagohain, and asked the king to evacuate, who refused. This led Ruchinath to suspect that Chandrakanta Singha was in alliance with Badan Chandra Borphukan, and left for Guwahati without the king when the Burmese army advanced toward the Ahom capital at Jorhat. The king, Chandrakanta Singha, stayed behind, received Badan Chandra Borphukan and made him the Mantri Phukan.

The Burmese army was paid 1,000,000 rupees and the commanders were given suitable presents. Hemo Aideo, an Ahom princess (daughter of Bagakonwar Tipam Raja and sister of Swargadeo Jogeshwar Singha) was sent to the king of Burma with 50 elephants and dowry. The Burmese army left Assam in April 1817.

After the return of the Burmese forces, Badan Chandra had become all-powerful. He began to torture the supporters of Purnananda Burhagohain, who was already dead. There were also differences between the Barbarua and barphukan. Further, disgusted with the activities of Badanchandra, Numali Rajmao (King Chandrakanta's mother), along with some officials, hatched a conspiracy to get rid of him. It culminated in the assassination of Badan Chandra in 1818 by a Subedar named Rup Singh.

== Second Burmese invasion ==
Bodawpaya, on hearing this news, sent an army of 30,000 under the command of Kiamingi (Ala Mingi Borgohain) and guided by Patalang Senapati (Momai Barua). This army was met by an army led by Jagannath Dhekial Phukan on February 15, 1819, at Phulpanisiga, near Janji. The Burmese army was defeated with a loss of about 300 soldiers and retreated a short distance. The Assam army, instead of pursuing the defeated Burmese, returned to the Ahom capital Jorhat leading to much confusion and panic. Failing to instill confidence, Ruchinath Burhagohain and Purandar Singha sailed down to Guwahati, and the Burmese army was able to occupy the capital two days later.

Chandrakanta was reinstated as the king on March 9, 1819, followed by execution of the Ahom officials who had supported Ruchinath Burhagohain; and in the middle of April 1819 Kiamingi left for Burma leaving Mingimaha Tilwa in charge. Under Tilwa's orders, Patalang pursued Ruchinath, engaged his forces in Nagaon and finally pushed him beyond Assam chokey. Patalang was made the Borbarua and the Burmese contingent returned to Burma on January 27, 1820. To express his gratitude to Bodawpaya, Chandrakanta Singha sent a princess, Upama Aideo, along with officials and attendants.

Nevertheless, Chandrakanta's attitude toward the Burmese changed soon after. Patalang, who was originally a Kachari, persuaded the king to shake off Burmese allegiance and had a fort constructed at Jaypur (Dighalighat).

== Third Burmese invasion ==
The third invasion was carried under Burmese king Bagyidaw

In 1819, Bagyidaw became the king of Burma and decided to annex Assam. He sent Mingimaha Tilwa to Assam in February 1821. Patalang Borbarua was killed and Chandrakanta Singha fled to Guwahati. Mingimaha killed a number of Ahom officials and installed Punyadhar (Jogeshwar Singha), a brother of Hemo Aideo, as the king.

=== Chandrakanta Singha's response ===
Chandrakanta Singha made his camp at Guwahati and lead his campaign against the Burmese. Purandar, who was unable to raise an army in the British territory, raised one in Bhutan under Robert Bruce, but this force was dispersed by Chandrakanta's Sikh forces in May 1821. A large force, deputed by Tilwa, advanced against Chandrakanta (September 1821), who retreated to Assam Chokey and then to the British territories. Unlike Purandar, Chandrakanta was able to raise a force mainly of Sikhs soldiers, and he retook Assam Chokey (October 1821) and Guwahati (December 1821) and pitched his camp at Mahgarh, near Jorhat, on March 15, 1822. The commander of the Sikh soldiers, Chataniya Singh of Lahore was killed although the Sikhs routed the Burmese hordes.

Bagyidaw, on hearing of the Assam situation, sent in a 20,000 strong contingent under Mingi Maha Bandula who attacked and defeated the forces of Chandrakanta in April 1822. Chandrakanta fell back to Guwahati, and finally to Assam chaki, where he encountered Mingimaha Tilwa in June 1822. He was defeated and had to further retreat into the British territory. After this victory, the Burmese declared Mingimaha Tilwa the Raja of Assam and brought an end to the sovereign Ahom rule in Assam.

=== Direct Burmese rule ===
The defeat of Chandrakanta at Assam Chokey brought the Burmese face-to-face with the British in the Brahmaputra valley. Tilwa demanded the British hand over the fugitive king, and threatened to enter British territory to seize him, with about 7,000 troops at Assam Chokey and 1,000 more at Guwahati under Bandula. Nevertheless, the Burmese troops faced logistics issues, and as a result Bandula left Guwahati, leaving Tilwa at Guwahati with only 1,000 troops. At this juncture, the Chandrakanta Singha was invited by the Burmese to come back and rule. Chandrakanta abandoned his Baruas and Phukan's and surrendered to Tilwa at Assam Chokey. When he reached Jorhat, he was seized and imprisoned instead.

=== Alternative Burmese account ===
This account differs a little from the Burmese account in which the expedition that started in February 1821 with the 20,000 (including 10,000 Khamti Shan and Kachin levies) Burmese Army is said to have taken one and a half years to reach Assam when it defeated Chandrakanta Singha in July 1822 and made Assam a Burmese province under a military governor-general, extinguishing the 600-year-old Ahom court once and for all. Chandrakanta Singha fled to British territory of Bengal. The British ignored Bandula's demands to surrender the fugitive king, and instead sent reinforcement units to frontier forts. Maha Bandula left a military garrison of 2,000 men commanded by Maha Thilawa, and returned to Ava.

This period is remembered in Assam as very difficult, with the garrison soldiers and native marauders committing atrocities on the common people leading to thousands leaving Assam for Bengal. Much of the neighboring State of Manipur was also laid waste by the marauding armies.

By 1825, the Meiteis under the leadership of Meitei king Gambhir Singh had repulsed the Burmese and drove them past the Chindwin River. The occupation led to frequent contacts between the Burmese and the British and finally to the First Burmese War and the Treaty of Yandaboo in 1826. This treaty marked the end of Burmese rule and the beginning of British rule in Assam.

== Atrocities during Burmese rule ==
=== Reign of terror ===
The atrocities committed by the Burmese in Assam have passed into the common traditions of the people, and have been confirmed by the recorded versions of sufferers and eyewitnesses, and of those who had come in contact with them. Gangs of local marauders and some of the neighboring hill tribes like the Jingpo/Singphos and Khamtis, having identified their interests with the invaders, committed the same atrocities on the people and carried off numerous inhabitants into slavery. Those who afford fled to the neighboring countries like Bengal, Bhutan and Cachar. It is impossible to estimate the number of persons who fled, were killed or deported to Burma. The wholesale depopulation and widespread misery and agony. Consequently, this excellent valley, in the words of M'Cosh, who surveyed it a few years after the Burmese invasion. The Burmese incursions in Manipur are said to have depopulated the country and removed all traces of Manipuri civilization. The period of seven year devastation in Manipur from 1819 to 1826 is known as "Chahi Taret Khuntakpa." The ravages of Bodawpaya and his predecessors had reduced parts of Siam into a desert, for years the fields round Tavoy were white with human bones. To escape from Burmese oppressions the greater part of the population of Arakan had deserted their country and taken shelter in British territory“ where taxation was reasonable, and a man could go to bed at night without wondering whether his throat would be cut in the morning by order of some official.“ The Muslim Pangal of Manipur too were devastated and taken as slaves by the invading Burmese armies.
