= Lechai Gohain, Namrupia Raja =

Ahom prince

Lechai Gohain
- Namrupia Raja
- Died: After 1701
- Issue: Ekadah Gohain; Balia Gohain; Bayursut Gohain; Ayusut Gohain
- House: Tungkhungia
- Dynasty: Ahom
- Father: Gadadhar Singha
- Mother: Joymoti Konwari

Lechai Gohain, Namrupia Raja (fl. 17th–18th century), also referred to as the Sarujana Gohaindeo, was an Ahom Prince accused of rebelling against his elder brother, king Rudra Singha. A member of the Ahom dynasty and its cadet branch the Tungkhungia line, he was the second son of Gadadhar Singha.

After the alleged conspiracy, Lechai was exiled to Namruk and had one of his eyes gouged out. As a result, his descendants were allegedly barred from the line of succession. Despite this, due to a lack of acceptable heirs to the throne in the late 18th century, two of his great-grandsons, Kamaleswar Singha and Chandrakanta Singha, both became kings.

Rudra Singha later believed the accusations against Lechai to be false, leading the king to appoint Lechai as the Namrupia Raja.

== Ancestry and family ==
Lechai Gohain was the second and youngest son of Gadadhar Singha and Joymoti Konwari. His grandfather, Gobar Roja, was the first king of the Tungkhungia branch of the Ahom dynasty. Lechai's elder brother, Rudra Singha, became the Ahom king in 1696.

== Exile (1701) ==
=== Events ===
In 1701, Lechai was accused of attempting to rebel against his elder brother, who became king five years earlier following the death of their father. He allegedly conspired with Bailung Dekaphukan, Bhitarual Phukan of the Sandikai family, Chekham Hajarika, Bandar Naibaicha Phukan of the Lanmakharu clan, and Lochan Bara of the Ghorachowas.

While Rudra Singha was putting on his shoes at his palace, he was presented with alleged evidence by Damodar Phukan of the conspiracy. After being presented with the alleged evidence, the king issued orders for their executions. However, he wished to spare the lives of the three Phukans who were instead dismissed from their roles. Other accomplices including the Ghorachowa Bara and Hazarika were executed. A few followers of Lechai had their noses and ears chopped off, before being decapitated.

=== Aftermath and legacy ===
After the rebellion, Lechai was deported to Namruk and one of his eyes was gouged out on the orders of his brother. As a result of the rebellion, the descendants of Lechai were allegedly barred from the line of succession. Gogoi writes that the king later learned that the accusations against Lechai were false, and he felt greatly aggrieved. Consequently, Rudra Singha appointed Lechai as the Namrupia Raja to make amends for his treatment of Lechai. In his death-bed injunction to his sons, Rudra Singha confessed that by "listening to the suggestions of enemies, I drove away the younger [brother]. I now perceive my error. "

Lechai's great-grandson Kamaleswar Singha acceded to the throne in 1795. This happened as since between 1714 and 1795, most royal princes had been mutilated by kings Lakshmi Singha and Gaurinath Singha. The selection of Kamaleswar was unpopular in part due to the previous disqualification of Lechai's descendants from the throne. Despite this, Kamaleswar's brother, Chandrakanta Singha, also later acceded to the throne.

== Issue and descendants ==
Lechai had four sons:

- Ekadah Gohain
- Balia Gohain
- Bayursut Gohain
- Ayusut Gohain

Ayusut Gohain was the father of Kadamdighala Gohain, Charing Raja. Kadamdighala was the father of two Ahom kings, Kamaleswar Singha and Chandrakanta Singha.

== See also ==
- Ahom kingdom
