= Kadamdighala Gohain, Charing Raja =

Ahom Prince (died 1799)

Kadamdighala Gohain
- Charing Raja
- Died: September 1799; Jorhat, Ahom kingdom
- Spouse: Numali Rajmao
- Issue: Kamaleswar Singha; Chandrakanta Singha; Maju Aideau
- House: Tungkhungia
- Dynasty: Ahom
- Father: Ayusut Gohain
- Mother: Murar Deuta

Kadamdighala Gohain, Charing Raja (died September 1799), also known as Dighala Gohain, was an Ahom Prince, military commander, and potential claimant to the Ahom throne. He was Charing Raja until his death in 1799. A member of the Ahom dynasty and its cadet branch the Tungkhungia line, he was a great-grandson of King Gadadhar Singha.

Gohain fought against the Moamorias in their rebellions in 1788 and 1790. He was considered a potential claimant to the Ahom throne, but was disqualified due to a mutilation of the eye. Two of his sons, Kamaleswar Singha and Chandrakanta Singha, became kings instead. Under the former, Gohain served as the titular Charing Raja, exercising considerable influence alongside his wife, Numali Rajmao.

== Ancestry ==
Kadamdighala Gohain was the son of Ayusut Gohain and grandson of Lechai Gohain, Namrupia Raja, who was the younger brother of king Rudra Singha. He was a great-grandson of Gadadhar Singha, of the Tungkhungia branch of Ahom kings. His mother was known as 'Murar Deuta'. His father, Ayusut, was accused of being illegitimate.

== Exile ==
Kadamdighala Gohain was one of the princes banished to Namrup, and suffered mutilation of the eye to disqualify him from the throne.

== Moamoria rebellion ==
Along with Bijoy Barmura Gohain and other nobles, Kadamdighala Gohain lent their support to prince Pat Konwar in his expedition against the Moamoria rebels, and helped assault the rebels and advanced up to Sibsagar in 1788.

In 1790, during the Moamoria rebellion, the royalists under the command of Gohain were attacked by the rebels at Bar Ali. However, the rebels were sent back and fled to Rangpur. Prime Minister Purnananda Burhagohain, later, despatched Gohain to the north bank at the head of the Badkatia Barbaruah force, but the soldiers defied the authority of Gohain, who then returned to Jorhat.

Gohain was described in the Tungkhungia Buranji as having "displayed considerable gallantry in the operations against the Moamorias."

== Charing Raja and death ==
In the years between 1714 until 1795, the Ahom kings had been descendants of the line of Rudra Singha, but many had been mutilated either by Lakshmi Singha or Gaurinath Singha leading to difficulties in succession. Kadamdighala was considered a potential candidate for the throne, but was disqualified due to his mutilation. Instead, after the death of Gaurinath Singha in 1795, prime minister Purnananda Burhagohain chose Gohain's son, Kinaram, who took the regnal name Kamaleswar Singha.

During the reign of his son, Gohain served as the titular Charing Raja. Along with his wife Numali Rajmao, Gohain exercised influence in deliberations with prime minister Burhagohain during the reign of Kinaram.

In 1799, Murar Deuta, died. A month later, Gohain died in September 1799 in Jorhat, and was succeeded as Charing Raja by his son, Chandrakanta, who also later became king. His bones were removed to Charaideo Hill under the escort of the Dihingia Phukan and the Chetiapatra Barua. Chandrakanta later accused prime minister Burhagohain of murdering Kadamdighala.

== Family and descendants ==
Kadamdighala was married to Numali Rajmao. Their children together included:

- Kamaleswar Singha
- Chandrakanta Singha
- Maju Aideau

Maju Aideau was married to a son of prime minister Purnananda Burhagohain, and later to Patalang Barbarua.
