= Haradatta Choudhury =

Indian revolutionary from Assam

- Died: Kamrup
- Occupation: Zamindar
- Known for: rebelling against the Ahom monarchy

Haradatta Choudhury was a rebel, who rebelled against the Ahom monarchy with the help Burkandazes who committed most of the atrocities in North Kamrup, till Haradatta was captured and killed.

== Rebellion ==
During the time of Kamaleswar Singha, a rebellion took place in lower Assam. This leader of the rebellion of Haradatta Choudary. He arranged a large force of Barkandazes, mainly of Hindustani and Sikh. Those Burkandazes were called Dhumdumias probably they had their headquarters at Dumduma. Barkandzes came to Assam as raiders, who were previously troops under the zamindars, they were not one force but many. The Burkandazes under the leadership of Alo Singh and Baju Singh committed much tyranny and atrocities in the north Kamrup.It is said that Haradatta also was aided by the Rajas of Koch behar, who wanted to recover Kamrup for one of the family. Pratap Ballah Kaliabhoumura Borphukan replaced Badan Chandra as the Borphukan, with some engagement, peace was established in Kamrup again.

=== Death ===
Haradatta was captured and killed, Biradatta had his eyes extracted out, and was sent to Jorhat.

== See also ==
Dundiya rebellion
