= Chandrakanta Singha =

Sudingphaa
- Chaopha/Swargadeo

Ahom King
- 1st Reign: January 1811 – February 1818
- Predecessor: Kamaleswar Singha
- Successor: Purandar Singha
- 2nd Reign: June 1819 – 1821
- Predecessor: Purandar Singha
- Successor: Jogeswar Singha
- Born: c. 1797; Ahom kingdom
- Died: 1839 (aged 42); Ahom kingdom
- Consort: Padmavati Devi
- Wives: Rani Madamvika; Nirmilia Kunwari
- Issue: Ghanakanta Singha; Hemakanta Singha; Devajani Aideau; Lambodar Singha
- Dynasty: Ahom Dynasty
- Father: Kadamdighala Gohain
- Mother: Numali Rajmao
- Religion: Hinduism
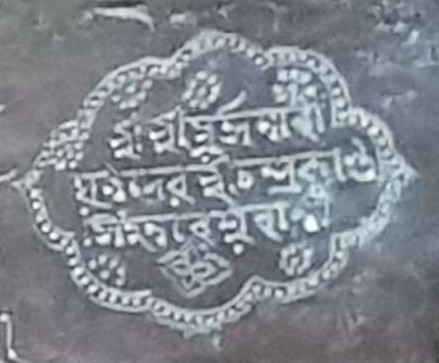
- Royal Seal

Chandrakanta Singha (c. 1797 – 1839), also known as Sudingpha, was Ahom King from 1811 to 1818 and again from 1819 to 1821.

A member of the Tungkhungia branch of Ahom Kings, Singha acceded to the throne following the death of his elder brother, Kamaleswar. His reign witnessed the invasion of Burmese on Assam and its subsequent occupation by British East India Company. He was installed as King twice. His first reign ended when Ruchinath Burhagohain deposed him and installed Purandar Singha in his stead. His second reign ended with his defeat at the hands of the invading Burmese army.

He continued his militant efforts to regain his kingdom as well as to keep Purandar Singha at bay. Finally he submitted himself to Burmese who induced him to believe that they will make him king. Instead he was seized and placed in confinement at Rangpur. After the defeat of Burmese in the First Anglo-Burmese War and subsequent peace Treaty of Yandabo on 24 February 1826 CE, Assam passed into the hand of British. Most of the members of Ahom Royal family were granted pensions. Chandrakanta Singha received a pension of 500 rupees. He first lived in Kaliabor and later on at Guwahati. He visited Calcutta in order to request the restoration of his kingdom but in vain. He died in 1839 CE soon after his return to Guwahati.

== Ancestry and early life ==
Chandrakanta Singha was the second son of Kadamdighala Gohain, Charing Raja, and Numali Rajmao, the queen-mother, born around 1797, two years after his brother. He was the brother of majiu aideo. Suklingpha had ascended the throne. Chandrakanta Gohain was raised in the royal palace at Jorhat. During his childhood, he made friends with the sons of junior officers and palace servants. Prominent among them was Satram, who was the son of a royal poultry keeper and he exerted great influence over Chandrakanta Gohain. After Kadamdighala died in 1799 Chandrakanta succeeded him and remained in that office till his accession to the throne.

== Accession to the throne ==
Kamaleswar Singha died of smallpox disease at the age of sixteen in January 1811. Purnananda Burhagohain nominated Chandrakanta as the new king of the Ahom Kingdom, who was then merely fourteen years old. During the coronation ceremony, young Chandrakanta was very nervous at the presence of so many people in the audience hall. He refused to sit on the throne unless his childhood friend Satram stood by him near the throne. The nobles hesitantly agreed and accordingly the coronation ceremony was completed. He was proclaimed Swargadeo Chandrakanta Singha, the sovereign of Ahom Kingdom. The Tai-Ahom priest conferred on Chandrakanta Singha the name Sudingpha. The expensive Singarigharutha ceremony, the traditional coronation ceremony, was withheld owing to the poor financial condition of the state.

== First reign (1811–1818) ==
Being still a boy Chandrakanta Singha was unable to take much part in the government of the country, and the control remained with the Purnananda Burhagohain. Purnananda Burhagohain transacted all the business in the name of the king without making any attempt to eclipse the king or obscure his name. He took the king around to important localities to give confidence to the people and instill in their minds respect for Ahom monarchy. While the Purnananda Burhagohain handled the affairs of state, the young king Chandrakanta Singha spend his time in amusement and fun in the royal palace in Jorhat among his friends and palace maids.

=== Opposition with Purnananda Burhagohain ===
As Chandrakanta grew up, he began to feel unrest at Purnananda Burhagohain's influence. With the help of his trusted friend Satram, who was raised to the rank of Charingia Phukan (officer in charge of administration of the region of Charing), Chandrakanta tried to free himself from Purnananda Burhagohain's influence and control. Chandrakanta often listened to Satram's advice in preference to nobles, and at last took to receiving them in audience with Satram seated at his side. The nobles protested, but in vain, and things rapidly went from bad to worse. Backed by Satram and other associates, the young King flouted Purnananda Burhagohain's opposition to his marriage with Padmavati, the daughter of a Bhakat or disciple of Bengena-atia Satra, a commoner and raised her to the rank of Parvatia Konwari or Chief Queen, and thus violated the time-honored custom according to which royal partners had to be selected from the principal Ahom families. In response to King's arrogant behavior, the nobles led by the Purnananda Burhagohain protested by refusing to grant the customary salute given to Chief Queen in the audience hall, thereby increasing the friction between two sides.

=== Conspiracy of Satram ===
Satram was of the same age as the King, but he was unrivalled in his precocity and cunning. Satram, himself held high ambitions and was aware of the fact that as long as Purnananda Burhagohain exercised absolute control over state affairs, his ambitions will never be fulfilled. Therefore, he began to gather support against the Burhagohain from various quarters of the Ahom nobility. First of all, he misinterpreted Purnananda Burhagohain's motives and actions and gradually poisoned the ears of Chandrakanta Singha. Badan Chandra Borphukan, the viceroy of Guwahati, was made to believe that Purnananda Burhagohain was his enemy and the Burhagohain was planning to destroy him. Badan Chandra's daughter Pijou Gabharu, who had married to Oreshanath Dhekial Phukan, a son of Purnananda Burhagohain, was also made party to this belief. Satram, along with his associates planned to assassinate the Burhagohain, while he was on his way to the royal palace. The plot was discovered and all the associates of Satram were arrested and duly punished. Satram fled to the Royal palace and sought refuge from the King. Meanwhile, Purnananda Burhagohain called on the Grand Council of the three Gohains, the Burhagohain, the Borgohain, and the Borpatrogohain. According to the custom of Ahom rule, the Grand Council of the three Gohains held absolute power. Unanimously, the council could enthrone or dethrone a king and it could revert any order given by the king himself. A wave of panic ran across Chandrakanta Singha and the royal family. The Queen-mother, Numali Rajmao pleaded with Purnananda Burhagohain to spare her son, the king. The Burhagohain gave his word to the Queen-mother regarding the safety of the King, and in return, he demanded Satram be surrendered to the Grand Council. Chandrakanta Singha reluctantly agreed to surrender Satram on one condition that Satram's life be spared. The Grand Council of Gohains, held a trial on Satram, in which his guilts were proved. Satram was banished to Namrup, where he was soon afterwards killed by some Nagas. It was believed that Satram was murdered at the instigation of Purnananda Burhagohain. Many believed that the King himself was privy to Satram's conspiracy. All these events took place in June 1814.

=== Badan Chandra Borphukan flight to Burma ===
News of Satram's fate reached Guwahati and Badan Chandra Borphukan became worried on account of his associations with Satram. In Jorhat, even though Purnananda Burhagohain suspected Badan Chandra Borphukan of favouring Satram's conspiracy, the Burhagohain initially hesitated to take action against him. But reports began to circulate of Badan Chandra's oppressive behavior and gross exactions on the people of Lower Assam, even as the conduct of his sons was even more outrageous. One of their favorite pranks was to make an elephant intoxicated with bhang and let it loose in Guwahati, while they followed at a safe distance, and roared with laughter as the brute demolished houses and killed the people who were unlucky enough to come in its way. At last, things reached such a pass that Purnananda determined that Badan Chandra had to be removed. In 1815, a deputation was sent to arrest him; but, being warned in time by his daughter, Pijou Gabharu, who was married to one of the Burhagohain's sons, he escaped to Bengal. He proceeded to Calcutta, and alleging that Purnananda Burhagohain was subverting the Ahom Government and ruining the country, endeavored to persuade the Governor-General Lord Hastings to dispatch an expedition against Purnananda Burhagohain. Lord Hasting, however, refused to interfere in any way. Meanwhile, Badan Chandra had stuck up a friendship with the Calcutta Agent of the Burmese government and he went with this man to the Court of Amarapura, where he was accorded an interview with the Burmese king, Bodawpaya. He repeated his misrepresentations regarding the conduct of Purnananda Burhagohain, alleging that he had usurped the King's authority, and that owing to his misgovernment, the lives of all, both high and low, were in danger. At last he obtained a promise of help.

=== First Burmese invasion ===
Towards the end of the year 1816 an army of about eight thousand men under the command of General Maha Minhla Minkhaung was dispatched from the Kingdom of Burma with Badan Chandra Borphukan. It was joined en route by the chiefs of Mungkong, Hukong and Manipur, and, by the time Namrup was reached, its number had swollen to about sixteen thousand. Assamese chroniclers of that time stated that the Burmese army was commanded by Bom Senapati and Kamini Phukan. Ultimatums were dispatched to the Ahom court from the Barphukan's encampment at Meleng in which the Burmese avowed their intention to place on the throne one Garbhe Sing Raja whom they described as the son of Gaurinath Singha, born during that monarch's flight from the capital which was obviously a ruse de guerre. Purnananda Burhagohain sent an army to oppose the invaders. A battle was fought at Ghiladhari in which the Assamese army was routed. At this juncture Purnananda Burhagohain died or some say, committed suicide by swallowing diamonds, leaving the entire Ahom government leaderless. His eldest son, Ruchinath, was appointed as Burhagohain. The Ahom war council decided to continue the war; and a fresh army was hastily equipped and sent to resist the Burmese. Like the former one, it was utterly defeated, near Kathalbari east of Dihing. The Burmese continued their advance pillaging and burning the villages along their line of march. Ruchinath Burhagohain endeavoured in vain to induce Chandrakanta Singha to retreat to Lower Assam, and then, perceiving that the latter intended to sacrifice him, in order to conciliate Badan Chandra and his Burmese allies, fled westwards to Guwahati. The Burmese occupied the capital Jorhat and Badan Chandra triumphantly entered the capital, interviewed Chandrakanta Singha and offered to run the affairs of the state in his capacity as Mantri-Phukan. The young king, Chandrakanta had no alternative but to acquiesce in Badan Chandra's proposal. Badan Chandra now became all powerful and he used his Burmese allies to plunder and slay all the relations and adherents of Purnananda Burhagohain. He removed all the officers from their respective offices, whom he suspected as supporters of Purnananda Burhagohain, including his own uncle Srinath Duara Borbarua, the well-known author of Tungkhungia Buranji (The chronology of Tungkhungia Kings). Meanwhile, friendly overtures were made to Chandrakanta from the Burmese camp. An Ahom princess Hemo Aideo (also known as Bhamo Aideo) was offered to the Burmese Monarch Bodawpaya for the royal harem along with fifty elephants. Hemo Aideo was accompanied by a large retinue consisting of ladies and attendants. The Burmese were paid a large indemnity for the trouble and expense of the expedition, and in April 1817, the Burmese returned to their own country.

=== Murder of Badan Chandra ===
After the Burmese returned to their country, Badan Chandra, now in possession of the supreme executive power, wreaked vengeance upon his old enemies. Many Ahom nobles including the Queen-mother Numali Rajmao was not happy with Badan Chandra's autocratic behaviour. She intrigued with Dhani Borbarua and Nirbhaynarayan Borgohain to destroy Badan Chandra. Two sepoys from Assamese army, Rup Singh Subeder and Rahman Khan Jamadar were appointed to carry out their purpose into execution. The two assassins approached Badan Chandra one morning when he was rubbing his hand with clay after performing his ablutions on the riverside. When questioned as to the object of their visit, the two sepoys replied that it is customary for servants to come to pay respects to their masters and to persons of authority and eminence. Thus disarmed of all suspicion Badan Chandra continued washing in the water when Rup Singh dealt him a cut over the neck with his sabre which felled him to the ground. The Jamadar followed up the stroke and Badan Chandra died.

=== Deposal and mutilation ===
After the assassination of Badan Chandra, the Queen-mother Numali Rajmao and other nobles called Ruchinath Burhagohain to return to the capital Jorhat. But Chandrakanta's peace with the Burmese, his support for Badan Chandra and his refusal to go down to Guwahati at the approach of the Burmese army, had raised the suspicion of Ruchinath Burhagohain that Chandrakanta was responsible for the attempts made against his father Purnananda Burhagohain followed by the visit of the Burmese troops. Ruchinath took up the case of Brajanath Gohain, great-grandson of Ahom king Rajeswar Singha, who was leading an exiled life at Silmari in Bengal and invited him to become a candidate for the throne. Brajanath Gohain agreed and he came to Guwahati where he was joined by Ruchinath Burhagohain and his supporters. After gathering a force of Hindustani mercenaries and local levies, Ruchinath and his party proceeded up to Jorhat. Chandrakanta fled to Rangpur, leaving Luku Dekaphukan in charge of the capital. Luku Dekaphukan offered some resistance to Ruchinath Burhagohain's forces but the resistance was easily repulsed and Luku Dekaphukan was killed. The victors succeeded in bringing over the royal troops to their interest. They then triumphantly entered Jorhat on February 17, 1818.

Brajanath at once caused coins to be struck in his own name, but it was now remembered that he was ineligible for the throne, as he had suffered mutilation of one of his ears. (The Ahom considered their king from divine origin and the person of the monarch, was sacred, and any noticeable sear or blemish, even a scratch received in play, a pit of smallpox, or a wound received in action, operated as a bar to succession). Therefore, Brajanath's son Purandar, then only ten years old, was brought from Silmari, who arrived in time and was acclaimed as sovereign of the Ahom kingdom of Assam. A few days later Biswanath Marangikhowa Gohain, brother of Ruchinath Burhagohain effected the slicing off of Chandrakanta's right ear in order to disqualify him from again sitting on the throne.

== Second Burmese invasion ==
The news of Chandrakanta's deposal and the murder of Badan Chandra reached the Burmese court in due time. The friends of Badan Chandra fled to Burma and informed Burmese King Bodawpaya of the course of events in Assam. Badawpaya immediately dispatched a fresh army of 30,000 men under a general named Alungmingi, also known as Kiamingi Borgohain.

One Momai Baruah, an Assamese noble who had risen to eminence in the court of Burma, had guided the Burmese during their second invasion of Assam. He interceded on behalf of the Assamese subjects and procured from the Burmese general an order for the stay of the atrocities. The Assamese army resisted the Burmese in Phulapanichiga near the Janji River on February 17, 1819. Initially, the Assamese resisted the Burmese with some spirit, but at a critical point in the engagement, their commander lost his nerve. They were defeated and beat a hasty retreat to Jorhat. Purandar Singha and Ruchinath Burhagohain fled to Guwahati taking with them all the valuables from the royal treasury, worth 3.5 million rupees. The triumphant Burmese now searched for Chandrakanta, led him from his retreat and installed him on the throne.

== Second reign (1819–1821) ==
The Burmese general returned to Amarapura and Momai Baruah was left behind in Assam along with other two commanders, Sajati Phukan and Mingimaha Tilowa Baju Paya. Meanwhile, Purandar Singha and Ruchinath Burhagohain regrouped their troops in Guwahati. Momai Baruah marched towards Guwahati at the head of a large Burmese force. An Assamese force, under the leadership of Bhisma Gogoi Borphukan was dispatched by Purandar Singha to resist the invaders. Both sides fought a battle in Khagarijan (present day Nagaon) on 11 June 1819, in which the Assamese army was defeated. The Burmese occupied Guwahati and Purandar Singha escaped to Bengal. Purandar Singha and Ruchinath Burhagohain appealed to British Governor-General Lord Hastings, to help recover their kingdom. The Governor-General replied that the British Government was not accustomed to interfere in the internal affairs of foreign states. Meanwhile, Chandrakanta Singha and his Burmese allies also requested the British authorities for the extradition of the fugitives, but to these requests also a deaf ear was turned.

=== Chandrakanta quarrels with the Burmese ===
Meanwhile, taking advantage of Momai Baruah's absence in Upper Assam, the Burmese commanders in Upper Assam killed a number of Ahom officials and nobles on allegations of secret sympathy for Purandar Singha. The Burmese appointed a Kachari, named Patalang, as Borbarua in order to strengthen their position in Ahom royal court. Chandrakanta did not approve of these high handed actions of his Burmese friends and proposed to shake of their cowering predominance once for all. He befriended with Patalang Borbarua by giving his elder sister Majiu Aideo in marriage with Patalang. Taking advantage of the return of the Burmese commanders and their troops to their country, Chandrakanta dispatched Patalang Borbarua to erect a line of fortifications near Dighalighat or Jaypur which lay in the route of the Burmese march to Assam. Chandrakanta also adopted other measures to undo the effects of the Burmese ravages on Assamese people.

=== Third Burmese invasion ===
In the meantime, King Bodawpaya died and he was succeeded by his grandson Bagyidaw. Chandrakanta's efforts to rehabilitate himself and to free himself from Burmese influence reached the ears of Bagyidaw. A fresh army was dispatched under Mingimaha Tilowa Baju on the pretext of handling over some presents to Chandrakanta Singha. The Burmese force approached the borders of Assam in March 1821, and witnessed the fortifications made in Jaypur. Patalang Borbarua was killed without any provocation and his wife Majiu Aideo was subjected to very severe assault at the hands of Burmese. The Assamese soldiers stationed at Jaypur deserted the garrison and all hope of thwarting the march of the Burmese into Assam came to an end. The Burmese tried to suppress the true facts regarding the death of Patalang Borbarua and invited Chandrakanta to receive the presents send by the Burmese monarch for him but Chandrakanta became suspicious by Burmese behavior. Meanwhile, Majiu Aideo escaped from her Burmese captors and fled to Jorhat, where she related to her younger brother Chandrakanta Singha all that happened at Jaypur. She pointed out the secret motive lying behind the invitation to receive the presents which the Burmese brought for him from Burma. Chandrakanta dispatched a force under Kalibar Burhagohain against the Burmese forces marching towards the capital Jorhat and he fled down to Guwahati. Kalibar Burhagohain was defeated and was taken prisoner by the Burmese. The Assamese soldiers tried to defend the Capital from the Burmese invaders, but they were overwhelmed and the Burmese occupied the city in April, 1821.

== Resistance to Burmese occupation ==
=== Background ===
The Burmese commander Mingimaha Tilowa Baju invited Chandrakanta to return to the Capital, but Chandrakanta refused to believe the Burmese and declined their invitation. Mingimaha Tilowa Baju, after obtaining consent from Bagyidaw, raised Jogeswar Singha, the brother of Ahom princess Hemo Aideo, who was married to Burmese King Bodawpaya, as the king of the Ahom kingdom in Assam in November 1821. The decision was aimed to placate the Assamese subjects who would naturally appreciate a native ruler being set up in their country but in reality, Jogeswar Singha had no vestige of any sovereign power and it was the Burmese general who held the real authority.

In Guwahati, Chandrakanta collected some troops to fight the Burmese, who at that time was confined in Upper Assam. Meanwhile, for more than a year, Purandar Singha and Ruchinth Burhagohain had been busy recruiting soldiers from Goalpara, Bengal and Bhutan, in Duars, an area located in the borders of Bhutan and Assam. With the aid of Robert Bruce (he is credited for the discovery of tea in Assam), Purandar Singha's army was supplied with guns and firearms. With his army fully equipped, Purandar Singha sent his men under the leadership of Mr. Robert Bruce, to attack Chandrakanta Singha's forces in May, 1821. Purandar Singha's forces were defeated by Chandrakanta Singha and their commander Mr. Robert Bruce was taken prisoner. Robert Bruce was later released on his agreeing to enter under the service of Chandrakanta Singha and to supply his soldiers' firearms and ammunitions. News of Chandrakanta's preparations alarmed the Burmese. They mobilized their troops in Upper Assam and marched towards Guwahati in September, 1821. Alarmed by the huge size of Burmese army, Chandrakanta retreated from Guwahati and halt at Hadirachowki (also known as Assam chowki), the western outpost of Ahom kingdom in Assam. At that time, the officer-in-charge of Hadirachowki, Holiram Duariya Baruah (later on, he would be appointed as Dhekial Phukan by Chandrakanta Singha; he was the father of noted Assamese reformer, social worker and intellectual Anandaram Dhekial Phukan) was guarding the Ahom Kingdom's western border with British India, with a garrison of three hundred Sikh soldiers. When the Burmese attacked Hadirachowki, Holiram Duariya Baruah and his Sikh soldiers fought bravely. But the Burmese came in overwhelming numbers and Holiram's forces were defeated. He himself was injured by a rifle bayonet thrust inflicted by a Burmese soldier. Chandrakanta Singha and his followers retreated across the border into British ruled Goalpara district. After this victory, the Burmese tried to expand their rule in other parts of Assam. The tributary chiefs, who were under the Ahom rule, offered their submission to the Burmese. Prominent among them was the ruler of Darrang. The only part of the Ahom Kingdom which escaped the Burmese domination was the tract between the Buri Dihing and the Brahmaputra, also known as Matak Kingdom, where the Moamorias, under the leadership of Matibor Barsenapati, maintained a precarious independence. Meanwhile, Purandar Singha also retreated towards the border of Bhutan to rally his forces after his recent defeat in the hands of Chandrakanta Singha.

=== Resistance ===
The Burmese seemed to have total control of the Ahom kingdom but Chandrakanta Singha was determined not to let the Burmese rest in peace. Towards the end of the 1821 A.D, Chandrakanta collected a force of about two thousand men, consisting of Sikhs and Hindustanis from British ruled Bengal. He rallied his men in the Goalpara district, and Mr. Robert Bruce obtained for him three hundred muskets and nine maunds of ammunition from Calcutta.

The Burmese troops and their followers were so numerous that it was found impossible to provide them with supplies in any one place. They were, therefore, distributed about the country in a number of small detachments. Chandrakanta Singha, seeing his opportunity, returned to the attack and, after inflicting several defeats on the Burmese, laid siege to Guwahati. The Burmese garrison in Guwahati was commanded by the son of Burmese commander Mingimaha Tilowa Baju (local people at that time called this commander as Deka Raja or Young King for some reason unknown). The initial attack by Chandrakanta Singha on Burmese entrenchments was repelled by the Burmese, and his commander Subedar Jagadish Bar Bahadur died in action, while his other two commanders, Gopal Singh and Bhola Paniphukan narrowly escaped. Boasted by their initial victory, the Burmese came out of their entrenchment and attacked Chandrakanta's camp, but Chandrakanta Singha now personally led his army and repulsed the Burmese, inflicting heavy casualties. Seeing the Burmese army in chaos, he led the counter-offensive on Burmese entrenchment and successfully broke Burmese defenses; and recaptured Guwahati in January 1822. The defeated Burmese troops retreated to Jorhat.

At the same time the Burmese forces on the north bank of the Brahmaputra were harassed by repeated incursions on the part of Purandar Singha's troops, which had rallied in Bhutan. The Assamese villagers, especially on the north bank of Brahmaputra joined the fray and waged guerilla warfare against the occupying Burmese troops after obtaining help from the tribes of Akas and Dafalas, completely diminishing Burmese authority from the north bank of Brahmaputra. The Burmese commander Mingimaha Tilowa Baju sent a long letter to the British Governor-General at Calcutta, protesting against the facilities which had been accorded to the Ahom princes and demanded their extradition, but the British authority gave no reply.

Meanwhile, news of Burmese reverses in Assam reached Burma. The Burmese monarch Bagyidaw sent his finest general Mingi Maha Bandula to reclaim Assam with reinforcements of 20,000 soldiers. Undaunted by enemy strength, Chandrakanta Singha marched upwards into Upper Assam with approximately 2000 men consisting of Sikhs and Hindustani mercenaries and some local Assamese people recruited around Guwahati. After pushing the enemy forces back, he pitched his camp in Mahagarh (presently known as Kokilamukh; located in Jorhat district ) near the capital Jorhat. On 19 April 1822 A.D. the 20,000 Burmese led by Mingi Maha Bandula and the 2000 mixed Assamese-Hindustani forces led by Chandrakanta Singha fought the decisive battle at Mahagarh. Chandrakanta Singha is said to have displayed unusual vigour and courage by himself present in the thick of battle; personally leading his soldiers; and engaged in hand-to-hand combat with enemy soldiers. For some time his troops held their own, but in the end their ammunition gave out and they were defeated with a loss of 1500 men. The Burmese won the battle due to their numerical superiority but sustained losses more than that of Chandrakanta's forces. Chandrakanta Singha and his remaining forces managed to escape back to Guwahati as the Burmese, like Chandrakanta Singha's forces run out of ammunitions and a lot of them were injured or dead after the battle.

Mingi Maha Bandula sent Burmese Commander Mingi Maha Tilowa Baju in pursuit of Chandrakanta Singha. Unable to resist the Burmese with his small force, Chandrakanta Singha fall back to Hadirachowki (Assam chowki), where he made preparation to resist the Burmese with his mixed levies consisting of Sikh, Hindustanis and Assamese soldiers. On 21 June 1822, Chandrakanta Singha made his final stand against Mingi Maha Tilowa Baju and his Burmese forces in the battle of Hadirachowki. In the battle Chandrakanta Singha was finally defeated and his army eliminated. Chandrakanta Singha narrowly escaped to British ruled Goalpara district. Meanwhile, after receiving the news of Chandrakanta's defeat and threatened by growing Burmese power, Purandar Singha and his forces also retreated from Assam. The victorious Burmese assumed themselves as the undisputed Masters of Brahmaputra valley. The Burmese commander sent an insolent message to the British Officer commanding at Goalpara warning him that, if protections were afforded to Chandrakanta Singha, a Burmese army of 18,000 men, commanded by forty Rajas( kings or chiefs), would invade the British territories and arrest him wherever he might be found. The British answered this threat by the dispatch to the frontier of additional troops from Dacca, and by the intimation that any advance on the part of Burmese would be at their certain peril. The British Officer was ordered that should Chandrakanta or any of his party, appears in Goalpara, they were to be disarmed and removed to a safe distance from the border. Chandrakanta Singha evaded capture by British authorities by bribing the native Indian officers serving under the British Officer.

=== Burmese atrocities ===
Even after their victory over Chandrakanta Singha, the Burmese suffered heavy losses, especially at the battle of Mahgarh. Therefore, they wreak their vengeance on common Assamese people, by committing numerous acts of atrocities. They rob everyone who had anything worth taking. They burnt down villages, plundered the temples, violated the chastity of women, and put large numbers of innocent persons to death. Previously the Assamese people on the north bank of Brahmaputra, with the aid of hill tribes Akas and Daflas, successfully overthrew the Burmese rule by organizing resistances and harassing the Burmese troops by waging guerilla warfare. The Burmese now appeared in overwhelming force and crushed out all attempts of active resistance in the north bank of Brahmaputra. In revenge for the opposition offered to their army, the Burmese slaughtered a vast number of men, women and children. Many Assamese people fled to the hills, and to Jaintia, Cachar and British ruled Bengal.

Meanwhile, the Burmese tried to revive diplomatic relationship with Chandrakanta Singha. They sent messages that they never meant to injure him, and had only set up Jogeswar Singha as King because he refused to obey their summons to return. Chandrakanta Singha, frustrated by his failure to recruit troops from Goalpara and Bengal, finally accepted the Burmese proposal of reinstalling him to the throne and surrendered to the Burmese in Hadirachowki. He was taken to Jorhat where he was seized and placed in confinement at Rangpur.

== After Anglo-Burmese War ==
In 1824 A.D. the First Anglo-Burmese War broke out. The Burmese was utterly defeated and were expelled from Assam, Cachar and Manipur. Finally the Burmese monarch sued for peace and the treaty of Yandabo was signed by both parties on 26 February 1826. According to the terms and conditions of the treaty, the Burmese monarch renounced all claims over Assam and British became the masters of the Brahmaputra valley. After establishing their rule in Assam, the British granted pensions to the members of Ahom royal family and other Ahom nobles. Chandrakanta Singha was also granted a pension of 500 rupees per month and certain Khats or Estates in Upper Assam. He lived at first at Kaliabor and later on at Guwahati amidst the splendor which could be commanded by a fainéant prince.

=== Attempt to restore Assamese independence ===
Chandrakanta made several pleas to the British authorities to restore his kingdom, but every time it was turned down. Meanwhile, certain members of former Ahom royal family and nobles conspired to overthrow the British rule from Assam. Though, the conspiracy was detected in time and the conspirators were duly punished, the British authorities were concerned over the growing dissatisfaction among the people towards British rule. Therefore, in an attempt to pacify the people, in 1832 A.D., the British Government considered restoring Upper Assam to the former Ahom royal family as a tributary prince. The two most suitable candidates for the throne were Chandrakanta Singha and Purandar Singha . After some interviews with the candidates and discussions among the British Officers, Purandar Singha was selected for the throne. Officially the British authorities stated that Purandar Singha was young, his behavior was pleasing and his manners were extremely good and he had abilities for administrations. In April 1833, Purandar Singha was appointed as a protected prince in charge of Upper Assam, excluding Sadiya and Matak regions, on a stipulated tribute of 50,000 rupees. Purandar Singha began well but within three years he defaulted in his payments. The British accused him of maladministration and corruptions. In view of such events, Chandrakanta visited Calcutta in 1837 and submitted his memorial to the Governor General for the restoration of his kingdom, but to no avail. During his stay at Calcutta, in September 1838, the British deposed Purandar Singha and annexed his kingdom. The last vestige of Ahom authority in Assam came to an end.

=== Death ===
Disheartened by the British non-acceptance to his request for restoration of his kingdom, Chandrakanta Singha returned to Guwahati. He died at his residence in Guwahati in 1839, soon after his return from Calcutta.

== Wives and issues ==
Through his Chief Queen Padmavati Kunwari, Chandrakanta had two sons and one daughter, Ghanakanta Singha Juvaraj, Hemakanta Singha Gohain and Devajani Aideo. His second wife, Rani Madamvika was the mother of Lambodar Singha Gohain. His third wife Nirmilia Kunwari was issueless. He also had a number of concubines mostly recruited from Hajo.

Chandrakanta Singha's son Ghanakanta Singha Juvaraj started Durga Puja celebrations at the Uzan Bazar Rajbari in 1829 AD. Ghanakanta Singha Juvaraj died at Gauhati on September 10, 1858, leaving behind his widow Rani Padmarekha and son Keshavkanta then aged 10 years. Ghanakanta Singha Juvaraj's son Keshab Kanta Singha was crowned Jubraj of Gauhati and he continued to live at Gauhati where he died in 1894 leaving behind his widow Rani Mahendri and her two step-daughters Mrs. Lauhityakumari Borgohain and Mrs. Prafullabala Chaudhury . In 1902, Rani Mahindri Devi, widow of the late Keshab Kanta Singha Jubraj of Gauhati was granted a sum of Rs 1000 to enable her to meet the expenses connected with the marriage ceremony of her youngest step-daughter Prafullabala with second son of Srijut Khogendra Narain Chowdhury, the Zamindar of Lakhipur, Goalpara in the month of January 1903. Rani Mahendri died at Gauhati in 1923. Pensions to the members of the Ahom Royal Family have ceased with the death of Rani Mahendri Devi in 1923.

== Land grants, constructions and literature ==
Like his predecessors, Chandrakanta granted lands to temples and religious places. He even made grants to Muslim Dargahs of Shah Madar at Bausi, Shah Fakir at Barnagar, Panch peer at Khetri, Syed Shahnur Dewan Fakir at Bhella, where he granted hundred bighas (Indian land measuring unit) of lands. During his first reign, the Queen-mother Numali Rajmao excavated a pond, and dedicates it to Lord Vishnu. It was known as Vishnu-Sagar Pukhuri. But later on it came to be known as Rajmao Pukhuri and it is known as Jorhat Barpukhuri or Purani Kacharir Pukhuri.

While Chandrakanta was living as a British pensioner in Guwahati, under his instruction Bisheswar alias Bikaram Bezbaruah compiled a ballad (poetic description of historical events) on Moamoria rebellion and Burmese invasion of Assam.

== Character and legacy ==
Contemporary Chroniclers stated Chandrakanta as a weak king who was unable to hold his nerve and was easily manipulated by the advice of his ministers and friends. The events of his first reign throw evidence to these allegations when he acted merely as a puppet in the hands of his powerful ministers. However his second reign and his continuous efforts to free his kingdom from Burmese invaders throws light to another side of his character, the one which is courageous, brave and full of determination. He hated to live under submission and events of his life had proved it. Even during his first reign, he dared to throw off the influence of the Prime Minister Purnananda Burhagohain by marrying a commoner and appointing her as Chief Queen, despite protest from the Premier and other nobles. While living as a British pensioner in Guwahati, he injured his third wife Nirmilia Kuanri with a sharp weapon after arguing with her. When the British officer in charge of Kamrup district, Major Adam White, warned him not to engage in such acts, Chandrakanta exclaimed "I am the scion of Tungkhungia clan. Only because I lost my kingdom, does it mean I even lost the power to punish my wife?".

In his lifetime, Chandrakanta witnessed the final days of Ahom kingdom, and its subsequent occupation by the Burmese and then by the British.

== See also ==
- Ahom dynasty
- Ahom kingdom
- Assam
- Guwahati
- Jorhat
- Kamaleswar Singha
- Singarigharutha ceremony
