= Ghanashyam Burhagohain =

Prime Minister of the Ahom Kingdom

Rajmantri Ghanashyam Burhagohain

Prime Minister of the Ahom Kingdom
- In office April 1770 – June 1782
- Monarchs: Lakshmi Singha; Gaurinath Singha
- Succeeded by: Purnananda Burhagohain

Personal details
- Died: June 1782
- Children: At least 5, including Purnananda
- Parent: Labanga Rajkhowa (father) (Note: Surya Kumar Bhuyan lists his father as Bhagi Burhagohain, but in Kuoigayan family genealogies published by Swarna Lata Baruah, Bhagi is listed as his paternal uncle.)
- Relatives: Ruchinath Burhagohain (grandson)

Ghanashyam Burhagohain (died June 1782) was an Ahom statesman who served as prime minister of the Ahom Kingdom from 1770 until his death in 1782. A member of the Kuoigayan family, he was the father of Purnananda Burhagohain and grandfather of Ruchinath Burhagohain.

Ghanashyam advocated for the massacres of the Moamorias to suppress their rebellions and any future dissent in both 1770 and 1782 to Kings Lakshmi Singha and Gaurinath Singha respectively. He was the first of four-consecutive generations of prime ministers, and after his death in 1782, he was succeeded by his son Purnananda.

== Ancestry ==
Ghanashyam Burhagohain was a descendant of the Kuoigayan family as the son of Labanga Rajkhowa. He was the great-grandson of Laichang Burhagohain and great-great-grandson of Lecham Burhagohain, as well as being a descendant of Aikhek Burhagohain.

== Premiership ==
=== Appointment and first Moamoria rebellion ===
After the restoration of Lakshmi Singha to the throne following the Moamoria rebellion, Ghanashyam was appointed Burhagohain (prime minister). Burhagohain was a strong advocate of violent repressive measures against the Moamorias; he stated in a speech before the King and council:

The men who commit treason against the king thereby perpetrate a crime against their countrymen. The rigorous measures adopted against such men in previous reigns are on record… Enemies should be killed and destroyed. Such a policy alone will remove disturbances from the land, by creating fears in the hearts of all potential miscreants, and by dissuading loyal citizens from sympathising or collaborating with rebels ... I have killed many Moamarias with my own hand. The survivors can never entertain friendly feelings towards us. The king should execute those whose loyalty is questionable; and no one should be spared.

— Ghanashyam Burhagohain, c. 1770

In the same speech, he argued that the king's predecessors "had established peace and quiet" in the country by "executions and massacres", and called for inquiries into Moamorias who had taken shelter in the "neighbouring territories".

=== Second Moamoria rebellion and massacre ===
Following the accession of Gaurinath Singha in April 1782, the Moamorias launched a surprise attack against the king and advanced towards Rangpur. A royalist force under Ghanashyam Burhagohain then drove the rebels away from Rangpur, and the rebels were defeated. Following the rebellion, on 23 April, the king deliberated with his ministers over how they should prevent further uprising. Ghanashyam strongly advocated for and supported a policy of extreme repression and a general massacre of the Moamorias. While the other counsellors did not fully support this, Ghanashyam's eloquence made them accept the idea and the king ordered the massacre of the Moamorias.

The massacres lasted for over a month; Bhuyan wrote that a report asserted that it resulted in the deaths of an estimated 700,000 Moamorias. After around six weeks, the Barbarua, the Bargohain and other officials advised the king to suspend the massacre. In response Ghanashyam stated "I intended to exterminate the poisonous nest of the Moamarias. My colleagues now desire the suspension of the slaughter after half the enemy have been destroyed. I predict that the Mataks will rise again and again and devastate the country. My colleagues will then remember me and realise the wisdom of my present action."

=== Death and succession ===
After falling ill, Ghanashyam obtained the orders of the king to appoint his eldest son, Purnananda, as his successor as prime minister. On his death-bed, Ghanashyam stated to Purnananda "greater distinction is in store for you than what fell to my lot. Think not evil of the king. The Mataks are the sources of all troubles. Seize those who in your opinion will rise to leadership and create mischief in the country. This course alone will enable you to carry on the work of administration smoothly... Finally, do not move from your country, even if it be deserted by the king, and perish in the bosom of your motherland." He also advised Purnananda against corruption and to be impartial in dealing with the convicts.

Ghanashyam died in June 1782 and was succeeded as Burhagohain by Purnananda.

== Family and descendants ==
Ghanashyam Burhagohain had at least five sons:

- Purnananda Burhagohain
- Sibanath Dolakshria Phukan (or Sibanath Molgharia Barua)
- Bishnuram Rajkhowa
- Jay Gohain Jalbari Phukan
- Gijing Gohain

Moloka Gohain and Sakhi Gohain are also listed as sons of Ghanashyam in some Kuoigayan family genealogies.

Ghanashyam was the first of four-consecutive generations of prime ministers: Ghanashyam, Purnananda, Ruchinath and Mahidhar.

== See also ==
- Ahom kingdom
- Burhagohain
- Borgohain
