= Purnananda Burhagohain =

Prime Minister of the Ahom Kingdom

Prime Minister of the Ahom Kingdom
- In office 1782–1817
- Monarchs: Gaurinath Singha; Kamaleshwar Singha; Chandrakanta Singha
- Preceded by: Ghanashyam Burhagohain
- Succeeded by: Ruchinath Burhagohain

Personal details
- Died: 1817
- Children: 4, including Ruchinath
- Parent: Ghanashyam Burhagohain (Father)

Military service
- Allegiance: Ahom kingdom
- Years of service: 1782-1817
- Rank: Burhagohain/Prime minister

Purnananda Burhagohain (died 1817) was the Burhagohain (elder councilman) as well as Prime Minister of the Ahom Kingdom from 1782 until his death in 1817. He was appointed as the Burhagohain in April 1782 after the death of his father Rajmantri Ghanashyam Burhagohain.

== Ancestry ==
Purnananda was the son of prime minister Ghanashyam Burhagohain of the Kuoigayan family. He had several brothers, including Sibanath Molgharia Barua.

== Premiership ==
=== Moamorias ===
As premier, he advised the king to follow a conciliatory policy towards the Moamariyas, but was overruled by the other nobles. However, at his recommendation, the king permitted the Moamariya's to have their Guru, as the Moamariya had been without one since Ashtabhujdeva and Deka Mahanta Bayan (alias Gagini) were executed by the Ahom government after the reinstallation of Lakshmi Singha in 1770. Accordingly, they made Pitambardeva, a member of the last Mahanta's line, the head of their Satra in February 1785.

=== Involvement in succession ===
Gaurinath Singha died in August 1795 without male issue. Purnanada installed Kinaram, a minor son of Charing Raja Kadam Dighala Gohain, on the throne. At his accession, Kinaram was given the Hindu name Kamaleshwar Singha and the Ahom name of Suklengpha.

=== Military affairs ===
In 1786 a rebellion broke out led by common weaver Harihar Tanti. They took over Rangpur. Many failed attempts were made to recapture the city.

Purnananda spent most of his premiership in suppressing rebellions, forging diplomatic ties and fighting over the Barkandazes.

Impressed by the Company army's discipline and organization during Captain Welsh's expedition, and finding it difficult to recruit soldiers through kheldars, Purnananda undertook measures to create a regular standing army. He retained Dina and Fakirchand, two Hindustani sepoys. The troops were given a uniform and armed with flint-lock guns, purchased in Calcutta. Later the strength of the army was increased, divided into 18 companies of 100 sepoys each, and stationed at both Guahati and Jorhat. Chandra Gohain, related to the Burhagohain, was appointed Captain. With the aid of this force, the Burhagohain quelled the Moamariyas and other forces.

In 1803 under the command of Bhadari Barbarua, Burhagohain attacked Kachari king Krishna Chandra because he refused to send back some fugitives. Purnananda entered into an agreement with Sarbananda Singha, the chief of the Moamariyas of Bengmara (present-day Tinisukia), by which he ceded to the latter territory between the Brahmaputra and the Burhi Dihing and accepted his title Barsenapati (Great General). This territory was called Matak rajya or the Matak Kingdom. In return Sarbananda agreed to pay the Ahom government an annual tribute.

== Family ==
Purnananda had four sons:

- Ruchinath Burhagohain
- Jagannath Naosalia Phukan
- Oreshnath Dhekial Phukan
- Biswanath Marangikhowa Gohain

== Death and aftermath ==
Purnananda had a rivalry with Badan Chandra Borphukan. In 1817 Badanchandra brought the Burmese into Assam. The Burmese army numbered 16,000 troops and arrived in Namrup in early 1817. On hearing of the enemy's advance, the premier sent 7 companies of sepoys to stop them. The two parties entered into an encounter at Ghiladhari, where the enemy overcame the resistance. Burhagohain learned that the enemy was accompanied by Badan Chandra Borphukan. This enraged the Burhagohain so much that he collapsed and died. Purnananda was succeeded by his son Ruchinath. Ruchinath lacked his father's qualities. Meanwhile, the invaders continued their advance, defeating the Assamese army. Ruchinath failed to induce Chandrakanta Singha to retreat and was left alone with his adherents for Guwahati. Badan Chandra reached the capital. He let Chandrakanta Singha remain as the king, but became the de facto ruler with the title of Mantri Phukan. Badan Chandra immediately satisfied his grudge by ruthlessly killing and plundering Purnananda's relatives and supporters.

== See also ==
- Ahom dynasty
- Kuranganayani
- Moamoria rebellion
- Burmese invasions of Assam
- Badan Chandra Borphukan
