= Dundiya rebellion =

Uprising in 18th century

The Dundiya rebellion was a late 18th century uprising against the Ahom kingdom in the Borphukan's domain (Kamrup region). The rebellion was headed by Haradutta Bujarbarua who, with mercenary troops, managed to occupy most of northern Kamrup before being beaten back. This rebellion was contemporary with the Moamoria rebellion in Upper Assam, the rebellion was suppressed by Captain Welsh in 1792.
