= Badan Chandra Borphukan =

Commander-in-chief (Borphukan) of the Ahom army

Badan Chandra Barphukan was the chief of Ahom forces in Lower Assam and betrayed the kingdom by inviting the Burmese to invade Assam. He was installed as the Prime minister by the Burmese and later assassinated by Subedar Rup Singh in 1818. He is generally held responsible for the beginning of foreign rule in Assam and North East India.
