= Burhagohain =

Great Noble of the Ahom Dynasty

The Burhagohain (Ahom language: Chao Phrung Mung) was one of the two original counsellors (Burhagohain, and Borgohain) in the Ahom kingdom. Selected by the Ahom king from among the members of the Ahom nobility (Satgharia Ahom), the Burhagohain (also written as Buragohain) vowed not to fight for the position of Ahom kingship, rather act as a guide to the Ahom king in matters of provincial administration in an efficient manner (King Maker). The other original counsellor was Chao Thao Lung or Borgohain. Both the positions (Burhagohain & Borgohain) existed from the time of the first Ahom king, Sukaphaa. A third position, Konsheng or Borpatragohain, was added by Suhungmung Dihingia Raja in 1527.

During the rule of Suhungmung, after the appointment of the first Borpatragohain, the Burhagohain was assigned to administer the Dihing province (the region north of the Dikhow river up to Tinsukia). Later, he was made in charge of the region between Sadiya province and Gereluwa river (Dikrong) on the north bank of the Brahmaputra, as Borbarua oversaw the territories between Sadiya province to Kaliabor on the south bank.

Effectively acting as the Prime Minister of the Ahom kingdom, the Burhagohain wielded tremendous power in governmental, military and strategic matters. In the long history of the Ahom kingdom, successive Burhagohains (for example, Atan Burhagohain and Purnananda Burhagohain) played a decisive role in protecting the kingdom from external and internal threats.

== List of Burhagohain ==
- Thao Mong Klin Man Rai
- Thao-Ru-Ru
- Thao Phrang Dam
- Khen-Pong
- Phun-Long-Kham-Peng
- Thao-Mong-Chang-Rai
- Thao-Mong-Nang-Dhu-Pu-Ra
- Lajan Chao-Phrang-Dam
- Lapet Chao-Phran-Dam
- Aikhek Burhagohain
- Chaopet Burhagohain
- Thakbak Burhagohain
- Sukulahuda Burhagohain
- Sariah Burhagohain
- Hatipoali Burhagohain
- Lasham Burhagohain
- Atan Burhagohain
- Dilihiyal Langi Burhagohain
- Kunwoiganya Mau Burhagohain
- Lankakia Khampeng Burhagohain
- Kunwoiganya Laisheng Burhagohain
- Dilihiliyal Aphau Khampet Burhagohain
- Bailung Bayan Burhagohain
- Domai Burhagohain
- Sengmun Burhagohain
- Bailungia Sonai Burhagohain
- Langmai Kalia Burhagohain
- Kunwoigayan Bhagi Burhagohain
- Ghanashyam Burhagohain (Kunwoigayan family)
- Purnanada Burhagohain alias Mahidhara
- Ruchinath Burhagohain

== Bibliography ==
- Gait, Sir Edward Albert (1963). A History of Assam. Thacker, Spink.
- Bhuyan, Surya Kumar (1964). Satsari Buranji(2nd ed.) (in Assamese).
- Gogoi, Jahnabi (2002). Agragian system of Medieval Assam. ISBN 9788170229674.
