= Thakur Gohain =

Ahom Prince and claimant to the throne

- Issue: daughter (wife of Kalita Phukan)
- House: Tungkhungia
- Dynasty: Ahom
- Father: Ratneswar Gohain

Thakur Bap Gohain was an Ahom Prince and claimant to the Ahom throne. A member of the Ahom dynasty and its cadet branch the Tungkhungia line, he was the grandson of King Rajeswar Singha.

He was a great-uncle of the final Ahom King, Purandar Singha

== Life ==
=== Ancestry and early life ===
Thakur Gohain was the son of Ratneswar Gohain, Tipam Raja, and the grandson of King Rajeswar Singha. He was a member of the Ahom dynasty and its cadet branch the Tungkhungia line, and had one brother Bijoy Barmura, who was the grandfather of the final Ahom King, Purandar Singha.

Gohain initially lived at Namrup, but following the Moamoaria rebellion, he fled. He stayed at the house of Amthakhowa Ligira for around one year, before staying with Sarujana Dining Mahanta.

=== Involvement in the Bhudhar Singha conspiracy ===
Gohain was party to the conspiracy of Bhudhar Singha and Bhadrasen Borbarua. An oath of mutual loyalty was sworn between Singha, Gohain and the Choladhara Phukan (younger brother of Borbarua). The Borbarua intended to place Thakur on the throne if he was unable to place Bhudhar on the throne.

After the conspiracy was exposed, Gohain gave his daughter in marriage to the Kalita Phukan, and escaped before his ear could be cut officially. The Borbarua subsequently expressed concern over religious figures possibly sheltering the prince. Gohain eventually sought refuge with the Silikhataliya Medhi after the conspiracy was exposed.

=== Attempt to seize the throne ===
After the failed Bhudhar conspiracy, Thakur Gohain made a plot to seize the throne, along with Lechengiyal Barpatra Gohain and the Na-Phukan. The Dihing Satra Mahanta was also implicated in the conspiracy. The plot failed; the mahanta was imprisoned while the Barpatra Gohain and the Na-Phukan were both executed.

Baruah asserts that Gohain was likely mutilated following the plot as he was not subsequently heard of making any further attempts to claim the throne.

=== Later life ===
David Scott later informed the governor-general to arrange a pension of ten rupees per month for Gohain.
