= Bijoy Barmura Gohain =

Ahom prince and claimant

- Died: After 1803
- Issue: Brajanath Gohain; Bhubaneswar Gohain; Indunath Gohain; Apa Gohain daughter (wife of Bodawpaya)
- House: Tungkhungia
- Dynasty: Ahom
- Father: Ratneswar Gohain

Bijoy Barmura Gohain (fl. 1775–1803) was an Ahom Prince and claimant to the Ahom throne. A member of the Ahom dynasty and its cadet branch the Tungkhungia line, he was the grandson of King Rajeswar Singha, and the grandfather of the final Ahom King, Purandar Singha.

Due to his involvement in conspiracies against King Lakshmi Singha, by 1775, both of his ears were cut off and his eye was removed, which made him ineligible for the throne. Despite this, after the death of Gaurinath Singha, he attempted to seize the throne in 1795 but was unsuccessful. After his defeat, he fled to Cachar, before the son of King Bhagya Chandra housed him in Manipur.

During his time in Cachar, he created an alliance with Burmese King Bodawpaya and offered his daughter in marriage. In 1797, Bodwapaya organised an army of 20,000 men to support the claim of Barmura but Burmese support was abandoned. Barmura then organised confederacy of the Moamorias and other conspirators who unsuccessfully rebelled; after this defeat Barmura fled to Cachar and later Bengal to seek English assistance. His son, Brajanath, continued his claim, but it was his grandson, Purandar Singha, who later became King.

== Ancestry ==
Bijoy Barmura Gohain was the son of Ratneswar Gohain, Tipam Raja, and grandson of Rajeswar Singha of the Tungkhungia branch of the Ahom dynasty. He was the brother of Thakur Gohain, nephew of Charu Singha, Charing Raja, and a great-grandson of Rudra Singha. His father was a nephew of Lakshmi Singha and first cousin of Gaurinath Singha.

== 1775 conspiracy ==
By 1775, Bijoy Barmura had been exiled to Namrup. In 1775, several exiled princes, including Bijoy Barmura, supported the rebellion of their cousin, Molou Tipamia Gohain, who rebelled against King Lakshmi Singha. However, the attempt failed following the death of the Tipamia Gohain.

For his involvement and implication in the 1775 conspiracies during the reign of King Lakshmi Singha, Bijoy Barmura had his eye removed and his second ear cut off. His first ear had been cut off on an earlier occasion. This punishment was also extended to his son Brajanath, who was then only five or six years old.

== 1780s activities ==
In the 1780s, along with Kadamdighala Gohain, Bijoy Barmura supported Pat Konwar in counteracting the influence of Moamoria rebels during the reign of Gaurinath Singha.

== 1795 rebellion ==
Following the death of Gaurinath Singha, Bijoy Barmura was considered a possible claimant to the throne. Between 1714 and 1795 however, Lakshmi Singha and Gaurinath Singha had mutilated many of the male-line descendants of Rudra Singha, including Bijoy Barmura and his son in 1775. Despite this, Bijoy Barmura was described as a "capable and energetic prince".

Apart from his mutilation, Bijoy Barmura had a superior claim to the throne than Gaurinath Singha's successor, Kamaleswar Singha. He attempted to seize the throne but was defeated by Prime Minister Purnanada Burhagohain.

== Exile and rebellion ==
=== Burmese alliance ===
After his defeat by Burhagohain, Bijoy Barmura fled with his family first to Cachar and then to Manipur. After this, he communicated with the Burmese government to invade Assam on his behalf. While in Cachar, Bijoy Barmura undertook negotiations where he offered his daughter in marriage to Burmese King Bodawpaya.

On the basis of evidence from the manuscript diary of Cox, George Thomas Bayfield wrote "At this time (March 1797) a Raja of Assam, who had usurped the throne, and had been deposed with the aid of the British, made an application to the Burmese Court for assistance, and great preparations were making for invading Assam although Captain Cox had previously informed the ministers, that state was under British protection".

Bodawpaya saw this as an opportunity to fulfill his territorial ambitions towards British Bengal, and an army was subsequently established at Amarapura. In early 1797, Bodawpaya sent for an advanced army of 20,000 men to "clear the roads" in route for Assam and intended to follow up this army with a much larger force. It was recorded that there was great excitement in the city and all the way up the Irrawaddy River there were preparations for war.

Surya Kumar Bhuyan asserts that Captain Cox advised the Burmese that Assam was a tributary of the East India Company, and the expedition was subsequently abandoned. However, Ramesh Chandra Kalita disputes this view, arguing that Assam was never a British tributary and that the Burmese never relinquished their assertion of rights over Chittagong, Cachar and Manipur despite British assertion of rights over them. Kalita instead contests that the Burmese postponed their invasion to enable them to fight back better in the Arakan-Chittagong against the British. Kalita also notes that during 1798–1812 affairs in Manipur and during 1812–23 affairs in Cachar diverted the attention of the Burmese elsewhere.

=== Confederacy ===
Ahom correspondence in the Buranji states that Barmura had come to the territory of the ruler of Cachar, and he was kept there and given livelihood. It then states that Aunpananda, son of the Manipuri Raja, took him away to Manipur.

After this, Barmura organised a confederacy of the Moamorias, who were the fugitives from Assam, and the Cacharis, and instigated them to wage war on the Ahom government. Krishnanarayan, the Cachari King, had been sent against Barmura by the King but instead joined forces with him. However, Barmura was defeated, having been pressed by shortages in food, and then left the territory. It is recorded that he killed Natua Laskar and then fled after his defeat.

The rebellion that Barmura was accused of instigating led to fighting at Jamunamukh where an imposter prince was captured by Ahom forces and beheaded. The rebels then regrouped with a son of Barmura, and went on to burn villages in Nagaon and killed sepoys. The Ahom forces were briefly defeated but reinforcements sent by Kamaleswar Singha defeated the rebels.

== Later life ==
After his failed rebellion, Barmura lived at Khaspur which was the capital of Cachar. The Ahom King made several efforts to the Cachari King to extradite Barmura, but these were unsuccessful.

The Tungkhungia Buranji records the letter of the Barbarua to the Cachari King, writing "you organised a confederacy of Barmura who is the son of a maid-servant, with the Moamarias, the fugitives and the Cacharis, and instigated them to wage war against our forces".

Barmura later fled from Cachar and went to Bengal where he sought assistance from the East India Company to reestablish his claim to the throne. His son Brajanath appealed to the English in Calcutta, but they did not support his claim.

== Issue and descendants ==
Bijoy Barmura had four sons:

- Brajanath Gohain, Charing Raja
- Bhubaneswar Gohain, Tipam Raja
- Indunath Gohain
- Apa Gohain

He also had a daughter who was the wife of Bodawpaya. In June 1797, Captain Cox wrote that his daughter was received into the King's harem with "great pomp and grandeur". She was later described as his favourite consort, and her arrival was celebrated in Ava.

Brajanath's son, Purandar Singha, eventually went on to become the last Ahom King.

Through his son Indunath, he was a direct male-line ancestor of Padma Kumari Gohain, the first female post-independence cabinet minister in Assam.

== Bibliography ==
- Bhuyan, S.K. (1949), Anglo-Assamese Relations, 1771-1826, Department of Historical and Antiquarian Studies in Assam
- Bhuyan, S.K. (1968), Tungkhungia Buranji Or A History Of Assam 1681-1826, Department of Historical and Antiquarian Studies in Assam
- Kalita, Ramesh Chandra (2013), Burmese Policy of Expansion towards Manipur, Cachar and Assam (1755-1826)
- Bhuyan, S.K. (1975), Swargadeo Rajeswar Singha, first edition, Publication Board of Assam Guwahati
