= Mohanmala Maladev Gohain =

Ahom Prince

- Born: Ahom kingdom
- Died: c.1769 Ahom kingdom
- Issue: Phedela Gohain
- House: Tungkhungia
- Dynasty: Ahom
- Father: Rudra Singha

Mohanmala Maladev Gohain, Barjana Gohain or simply known as Mohanmala Gohain, (died c. 1769) was an Ahom Prince and the third son of Rudra Singha who was a claimant to the Ahom throne.

== Denial to the throne ==
He had an attack of smallpox, but it was Keertichandra Borbarua, grown as very prominent figure. The rising power denied the claims of Mohanmala Gohaindeo to the throne and gave it away to his younger brother Rajeswar Singha. On his advice, he was exiled to Namrup.

== Rebellion ==
After the death of Rajeswar Singha, was succeeded by Lakshmi Singha he was sat on the throne by the help Keertichandra Borbarua, which was not a favourable choice. The dissatisfied Moamoria's rebelled against the monarch. Mohanmala Gohaindeo along with Maju Gohain and Saru Gohain (exiled sons of Rajeswar Singha) by Lakshmi Singha. The exiled royals befriended with the rebels and promised to make them king when needed. Little did they know they came from low quarters. Batgharia Mohanmala Gohain was made the chief of the rebels. With the rebels they fought with the Senapati phukan, destroyed the fort and captured the phukan. When the news reached to Swargodeo, he expressed his sorrow.

== Issue ==
Gohain had children including Phedela Gohain.
