= Rudra Singha =

Ahom king from 1696 to 1714

Rudra Singha Sukhrungphaa
- Swargadeo; Chaopha; Saumeswara
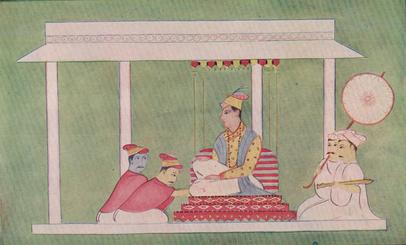
- Rudra Singha receiving the homage of the Dimasa and Jayantia kings in his court.

Ahom King
- Reign: 1696 – 27 August 1714
- Predecessor: Gadadhar Singha
- Successor: Siva Singha
- Born: Lai Gohain c.1665
- Died: 27 August 1714 (aged 49); North Guwahati, Ahom kingdom (present-day Assam, India)
- Consort: Keri Rajmao
- Wives: See list: Daughters of Sandikoi Borphukan; Daughter of Pani Phukan; Daughters of Borgohain
- Issue: Siva Singha; Pramatta Singha; Mohanmala Gohain; Rajeswar Singha; Lakshmi Singha
Names
- Sri Swarganarayandeva Rudra Singha Nripati
- House: Tungkhungia
- Dynasty: Ahom
- Father: Gadadhar Singha
- Mother: Joymoti Konwari
- Religion: Hinduism

Rudra Singha (born Lai Gohain; c. 1665 – 27 August 1714), also known as Sukhrungpha, was Ahom King from 1696 until his death in 1714.

His father Gadadhar Singha freed Assam from the Mughal disturbances and internal conspiracies, thereby Rudra Singha inherited a stable state and government and had the advantage of the solid foundations laid by his father. He devoted his time to transform Assam into a first-rate power in India. He stopped the persecution of the Neo-Vaisnava sect and built temples, several public works, and patronised art, literature, and culture. Rudra Singha is also famed for being the real father of Ahom architecture. He gave up the isolationist policy of his predecessors, forged diplomatic ties with various states of that time, and established extensive trade with Bengal.

He remodeled the administrative structure and army and carried on aggressive warfare upon the neighboring chiefdoms and countries, the Jaintias and Dimasas submitted and became vassals. Rudra Singha strengthened by various factors built a coalition of rulers in the region and raised a vast composite army against the Mughal Empire. He died on the eve of his march west from Guwahati, and was succeeded by his eldest son, Siva Singha.

He is considered as the most illustrious of the Ahom kings, under whom the kingdom reached its zenith of power and glory. During his reign, the Ahom nobility was far better organised than ever and stood behind the King representing cherished feudal values and aspirations.

== Ancestry ==
Lai Gohain was born as the son of King Gadadhar Singha and Joymoti Konwari. He was a descendant of the Tungkhungia branch of the Ahom dynasty, and had one younger brother, Lechai. His mother died after being tortured while refusing to reveal the whereabouts of his father, which allowed his father to later accede to the throne.

== Accession to the throne ==
Gadadhar Singha died in February 1696, and Lai Gohain subsequently ascended to the throne. He took the Tai name Sukhrungpha and the Hindu name Rudra Singha.

== Military campaigns ==
=== Expedition of Dimasa Kingdom ===
Ahoms had long considered the Dimasas as their vassals. The Dimasa Kings became reluctant to accept the thapita-sanchita status; to recognize Ahom hegemony. When the Dimasa King Tamadhwaj boldly asserted his independence and claimed territory up to Mahang in a letter sent in 1704–05, this greatly infuriated the Ahom King. Ahoms on the other side launched an offensive. In December 1706, an expedition was launched in two divisions simultaneously; one under Dihingia Deka Borbarua with 37,000 men was to proceed through the Dhansiri route and another one under Pani Phukan with 34,000 men through the Kapili route. The Ahom strategy was to attack from two sides so they could not concentrate their force on any one direction. Rudra Singha personally supervised the whole expedition at the headquarters, Biswanath.

==== March ====
Ahom expedition of Dimasa Kingdom
Date	December 1706
Location	Assam
Result	Ahom victory: Dimasa king accepts Ahom overlordship.
Territorial changes	Territory up to Jamuna river ceded to Ahoms

Commanders and leaders
Rudra Singha; Dihingia Deka Borbarua; Pani Phukan	Tamardhwaj Narayan

Units involved
Ahom kingdom	Dimasa kingdom

Strength
Total: 71,000; Bobarua's army: 37,000 Paniphukan's army: 31,000	Unknown but much smaller

Dihingia Deka Borbarua, in order to maintain communications and facilitate the transmission of supplies, forts were constructed and garrisoned on the route. In between the neighboring Nagas caused frequent plunder of the Ahom supply convoys. Miri Archers were effectively deployed at various forts to stop the Naga menace. The Babaura's men at Namira fort defeated the defenders and made them flee. Between Dijoa and Lenguria the Nagas joined the Dimasa's and killed a large number of Ahom rice-porters. Additional reinforcement was sent for the safeguard of food provisions and for strengthening the captured forts.

The Borbaura's force advanced with fresh vigor. From Lathee the Dimasas fled to Tarang and thence Hajo-Lalung fort. They fled after an encounter and the Borbaura's force occupied the empty fort. The Borbarua then advanced pursuing the enemies to Maibang and occupied the fort in mid-February 1707. At Maibang considerable war spoils were gained.

The Pani Phukan's route lay through Raha, Salgaon, Lambur, Dharmapur, Demera, and Nadereng to Maibang. As there was no regular road the army had to cut its way through dense jungle. A garrison of 3,000 men was left at Demera which was occupied; other places were sacked, and 322 prisoners were taken. Meanwhile, the Pani Phukan came to know about the occupation of Maibang by the Barbarua and informed the king about the latter. The superior strength of the Ahom army overawed the Kacharis who could not repel the invasion. After the occupation of Maibang the king ordered further advance up to Khaspur to arrest the Dimasa king. But at Maibang the troops suffered greatly because of the pestilential climate and many including the Borbarua fell ill. Supplies ran short. Inaction in place of vigor seized the camp. The Pani Phukan and other commanders were sent orders to march up to Khaspur, but could not march further as there was a shortage of supplies and many soldiers had died. The remaining soldiers too, were suffering from the pestilential climate of Maibang. But still, accordingly, a contingent was sent to Khaspur and encamped at Mai-Lang-Dam. From there three messengers were sent to the Dimasa raja to submit to the Ahom king.

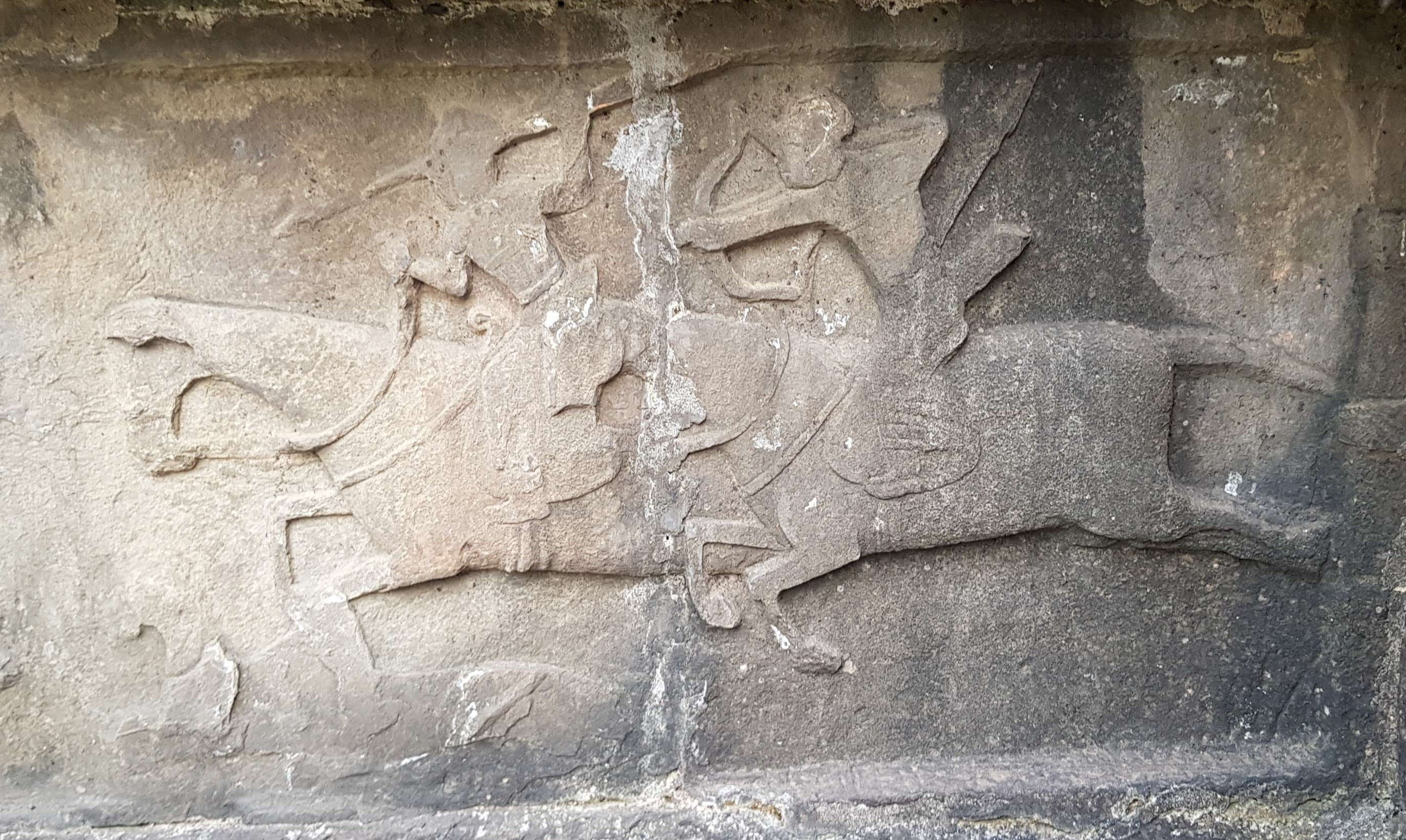
Ahom cavalry men armed with bows and spears.

On the other hand, the king ordered to bring the Borbaura along with the sick soldiers to Demera, the Borbarua, now seriously ill, died during the return journey to Demera at Kelemu camp. At this point, Rudra Singha decided upon to abandon the expedition and ordered the army to return.

==== Return ====
In March 1707 the king recalled the Pani Phukan who brought back the whole force after demolishing the brick fort at Maibang, burning down houses there and erecting a thirteen feet high pillar to commemorate his success. Fortifications were made at Demera where a strong garrison was left, which had to be withdrawn by the king owing to sickness and mortality with the setting in of the rains. Terrified by the advancing Ahom armies, Tamradhvaj fled to Bikrampur and sent an urgent appeal for help to Ram Singh, King of Jaintia Kingdom.

=== Expedition of Jaintia Kingdom ===
Tamradhwaj fled to Bikrampur and sent an urgent appeal for help to Ram Singh, King of Jaintia, on the

Ahom expedition of Jaintia kingdom
Location
Result
Assam
Bangladesh
Inconclusive
- Jaintias accept Ahom vassalship and agrees to pay annual tribute

Belligerents
Ahom Kingdom	Jaintia Kingdom

Commanders and leaders
Surath Singha Borbarua; Patar Borphukan	Ram Singh

Strength
Total: 44,000	Unknown but much smaller

withdrawal of the Ahom forces, he sent a second message to Ram Singh, saying that help was not necessary. Ram Singh now decided to take advantage of the dispersal of the Dimasa troops by the Ahoms, hatched a treacherous plan to seize the person of the Dimasa king with a view to gaining possession and control of the Dimasa kingdom; under the pretext of a friendly meeting, he seized Tamradhwaj along with his wife and carried him off to the Jaintia capital, Jaintipur.

The Kachari queen still in captivity, managed to send a message to Rudra Singha through a 'Bairagi', asking for forgiveness and begging for deliverance from his captor. Rudra Singh sent word to Ram Singh through - the Ahom officer in charge of the Ahom outpost at Jagi, demanding the immediate release of Tamradhvaj. Ram Singh refused, and Rudra Singh closed the market at Gobha on which the hill Jaintias depended for their supplies. Rudra Singha made preparations for the invasion of Jaintia territory. He established his headquarters at Misa for the expedition. He sent two divisions of the army, one under the Borbarua and the other under the Borphukan.

==== March ====
In December 1707, Surath Singha Borbarua with a force of 43,000 men and number of commanders, was to march towards Jaintiapur via the Kopili valley and the Dimasa country And the other division under the Borphukan advanced from the Barkharoi camp by the Gobha route, he was accompanied by the king of Darrang and the Phukan under the Buragohain, a Dafla and a Miri contingent accompanied him. The Solal Gohain, Duwalia Phukan, and the Duwalia Rajkhowas were stationed at Gobha for the supply of provisions.

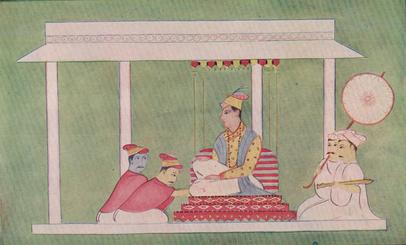
Dimasa king Tamardhwaj and the Jaintia King Ram Singh paying their homage to Rudra Singha.

The Borbarua reached Sampai easily and here a Dimasa deputation assured that nothing was to be feared from the neighboring Naga tribes. He proceeded to Bikrampur and during his march, he sent messengers in advance to reassure the people who came and paid their respects and were glad that the forces needed no supplies of provisions from them. The Borbarua desisted his soldiers from ravaging Dimasa villages, assured the latter, and offered presents to help them against the Jaintias.

After the Ahom force reached Mulagul, Ram Singh was called upon to surrender Tamradhwaj and his family and officers. Envoys were sent to Nawab of Sylhet informing the purpose of the mission and reiterating friendship.

Ram Singh prepared for a fight, but the nobles who tried to dissuade him from his present adventure would not allow him to escape scot-free. He therefore proceeded towards the Borbarua camp for making his submission, escorted by twenty elephants. Near the camp, he was made to dismount and ride on horseback, unattended. After the interview, he was not allowed to return but was made a captive by the Borbarua. The Borphukan reached Gobha on 20 January 1708, and conciliated the Chiefs of Gobha by presents. His forces on the march were harassed by the Garos at several places. The Garos attacked his men, while they were clearing routes. However, they were dispersed with guns and arrows. His route from Jagi lay through Gobha, Athitbhaga Lachor Hill, Buritikar Hill, the Barpani River banks, and Pavanai to Jaintipur. In certain engagements, the Jaintias fared well but were ultimately worsted by the Ahoms who had the advantage of superior numbers and strength and reinforcements at crucial moments. In another fierce battle, the Ahoms killed a number of Jayantia commanders and captured 12 of them along with 20 soldiers and 20 elephants.

After this battle, the Jaintia king was compelled to surrender the Dimasa king along with all his associates to Borbarua on 11 February 1708. After that both the Borbarua and Borphukan resumed their march towards the Jaintia king, then the Jaintia king along with his son submitted to Borbarua.

==== Annexation of Jaintia and Dimasa territories ====
Rudra Singha ordered the captive kings to be brought to him along with the Jaintia King's garments, jewels, arms, elephants, and horses and the Jaintia king's treasures to be divided among the troops. The Ahom subjects who had fled to Khaspur during Mir Jumla II invasion were brought back and an army of occupation under the Borbarua and the Borphukan was stationed at Jaintiapur. Envoys were sent to the Muhammadan Faujdar of Sylhet to announce that the Kachari and Jaintia kingdoms had been annexed to the Ahom dominions. Both the captive kings were presented before the Ahom king, and made to take the oath of allegiance to him.

==== Expulsion and return ====
These measures greatly irritated the Jaintia nobles who induced the Bar Dalai, the Raja of Khairam, and the inhabitants of two hundred independent Khasi villages to join them in expelling the invaders. The Jaintias could not rescue their Raja as he was being taken to Gobha by a strong force, but they attacked eight forts with garrisons left by the Borphukan and took three of them. A detachment that was taking the copper image of the Goddess Jaintesvari to Rudra Singha was put to flight and the image was rescued. The Ahom soldiers seized with panic, fled, and were pursued by the Jaintias. Rudra Singh sent up reinforcements including four thousand men under the Burhagohain. The Jaintia strategy of dispersing when attacked and of returning to the attack themselves thereafter made decisive victory impossible for the Ahoms. The Borbarua and Borphukan sent reinforcements from Jaintipur, no doubt, but with the approach of the rains, it was thought unwise and dangerous to remain in hostile territory, and retreat to Gobha was decided upon. Before departing, the Ahoms put to the sword a thousand inhabitants of Jaintipur and destroyed surrounding villages.

==== Foils and casualties of the campaign ====
For the ultimate failure of the expedition, Rudra Singha thought of punishing the Borbarua and the Barphukan but pardoned them on the intercession of other nobles. Rudra Singha severely punished those commanders who expressed unwillingness to march forward against the Jaintias.

In the course of the Jaintia rising, the Ahoms lost 2,366 men including 12 high-ranking officers. About 1,600 persons, chiefly Assamese refugees were brought from Khaspur and 600 from Jaintipur. During the expedition, 3 cannons, 2,273 guns, 109 elephants, 12,000 pieces of silver from the Muhammadaman, Ahom, Koch, and Jaintia mints, and numerous utensils of gold, silver, and other metals were taken. Certain articles of jewelry misappropriated by some officers had to be disgorged by them on detection.

=== Second & third Jaintia expeditions ===
Meanwhile, the Jaintia King Ram Singh, who is still in Ahom captivity died in August 1708. Later that month, Rudra Singha despatched Ram Singh's son, Barkonwar (crown-prince) to be sent to Jaintia, but as a pre-requisite, he insisted on the personal attendance and submission of the Jaintia nobles but the latter refrained. Rudra Singha lost his patience and launched another expedition to Jaintia Kingdom, by dispatching two divisions along the routes of Gobha and Kopili. The Ahoms advanced by devastating several villages and acquiring booty. On this scene the Barkonwar appeared, pleading to stop the depredations and assuring the submission of his nobles. At long last two years, Rudra Singha agreed to come on terms and declared Barkonwar king of Jaintia as thapita-sanchita vassal and the latter acknowledged the overlordship of Ahoms and agreed to pay tributes. But later on, the Barkonwar refrained from accepting Ahom vassalship and refused to pay tribute, leading Rudra Singha to undertake a third expedition. Barkonwar was defeated and was imprisoned for 14 years and an economic blockade was imposed on the Jaintias.

== Proposed invasion of Bengal ==
Historian Surya Kumar Bhuyan sought to explain the objectives of this proposed invasion of Bengal by the following points– i) Rudra Singha was informed of the plight to which Hindus had been rendered; ii) He himself was humiliated by Murshid Quli Khan who sent to him robes as presents which were meant for the vassal chiefs; iii) Assamese pilgrims also received obstruction from the Mughal officers in their visits to the Hindu shrines in India, specifically in connection with the pilgrimages to the Ganges.

He then began to make elaborate preparations for a fresh war against Mughals with two ends in view namely, to oust them from their sovereign power in eastern India and to expand their territory to the Ahom kingdom as far as the Karatoya river to the west. In a general meeting conveyed in Rangpur in 1713, Rudra Singha expressed his intention of invading "the territories lying between the boundaries of Dacca and Rangajara", to recapture the territories under the possession of his predecessors.

He carefully thought of his plan to create an opinion among the Hindu Rajas outside Assam and also attempted to organize a confederacy of the Rajas of Hindustan and sent messages to several Rajas and Zamindars, this included Twipra (and Morang, Bana-Vishnupur, Nadiya, Cooch Behar, Burdwan, and Barahanagar) kingdoms to remove the Mughals from Bengal. He appealed to their religious sentiments, which is evident from the letters sent to the king of Tripura Ratna Manikya II, where he wrote:

This has become very widely current among the people that owing to the hostile actions of the Mughals, the religion as inculcated in the Vedas does not get any protection. For this, if it appears to you to be the right thing to put a stop to this situation by some action, then please write to me in detail about your strength and aptitude after discussing with the big personage with whom you have friendship...

Thus he took the initiative to form a Hindu union against the Mughals.

The subjugated Jaintias and Dimasa. promised to render military assistance, some rulers of India like the rulers of Amber and Cooch Behar also assured assistance upon the scheme of Rudra Singha.

Rudra Singha then augmented his army, his artillery, and his navy. The local levies were trained on up-to-date lines. He raised numerous cavalry and trained the elephants to withstand fights. During these preparations, he adopted measures to obtain the goodwill of the inhabitants of Bengal in order to render his supremacy acceptable to them. He then advanced towards Guwahati and mobilized an army composed of four lakhs men with all cannons available. But the sudden death of the monarch on 27 August 1714, accounted for nothing and this project was given by the successor king Siva Singha.

== Influence on Hindu Religion ==
Rudra Singha reversed the persecution of the Satras as advised by Gadadhar Singha in his death-bed, and reinstated the satra preceptors, including Chaturbhujdeva the satradhikar of Mayamara Satra, in their former seats. He received the initiation from the Auniati Satra, Haridev, who was the most influential Brahmana Satradhikar. However, he soon created dissension in the Vaisnava camp by promulgating a synod, which debarred the Shudra Mahantas from initiating Brahmins, and which was completely against the principles of creed propagated by Sankardeva.

Rudra Singha during his reign recognized the four Satras: Auniati, Dakhinpat, Garamur, and Kuruabahi as Rajasatra, bestowed preferential treatments and seniority.

=== Inclination towards Shaktism ===
Later in his life he inclined towards Shaktism and thought of becoming an orthodox Hindu, and invited Krishnaram Bhattacharya Nyayavagish from Nabadwip, Bengal to take him as his religious guide, and desired to take his initiation after having promised to give the management of Kamakhya Temple. But sent him back him back after his arrival, Krishnaram Bhattacharya went back with a fury, when several earthquakes occurred, noticing Rudra Singha thought of him as a favorite of God, re-called Krishnaram, but died before he could arrive. But, he on his death-bed injunction advised his sons to take his initiation.

== Patronage of cultural activities ==
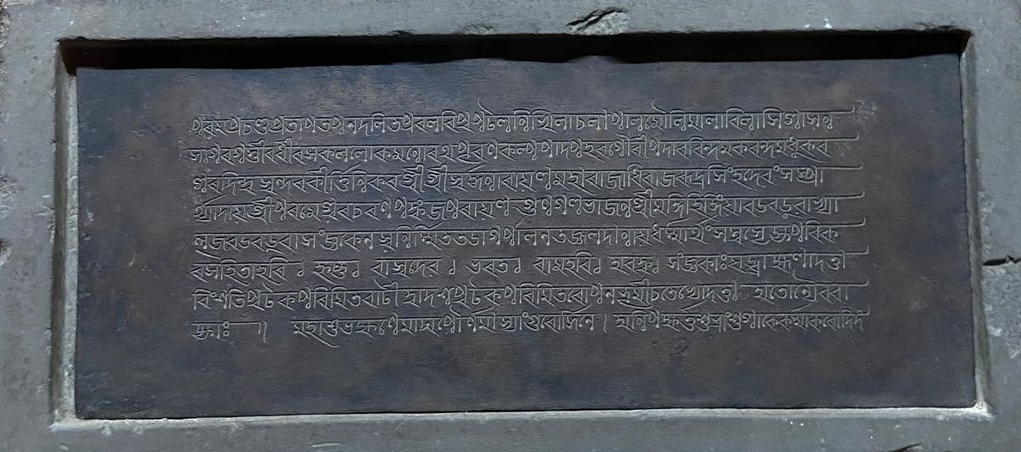
Rudra Singha's Lepeta Kata copper inscription.

Since the days of Sudangphaa, Sanskritisation or Indianization of the gained momentum and reached its peak during the regime of Rudra Singha and Siva Singha.

Rudra Singha, being helped by the material conditions of the time, acted more vigorously in line with his tradition. Now, in order to consolidate the Ahom monarchy in the force of growing feudal forces leading the Neo-Vaishnavite movement, Rudra Singha had to look up to friends among feudal rulers elsewhere in India and to secure a place of confederacy them, thereby integrating the Ahom ruling class with the Indian ruling classes, including the Mughals.

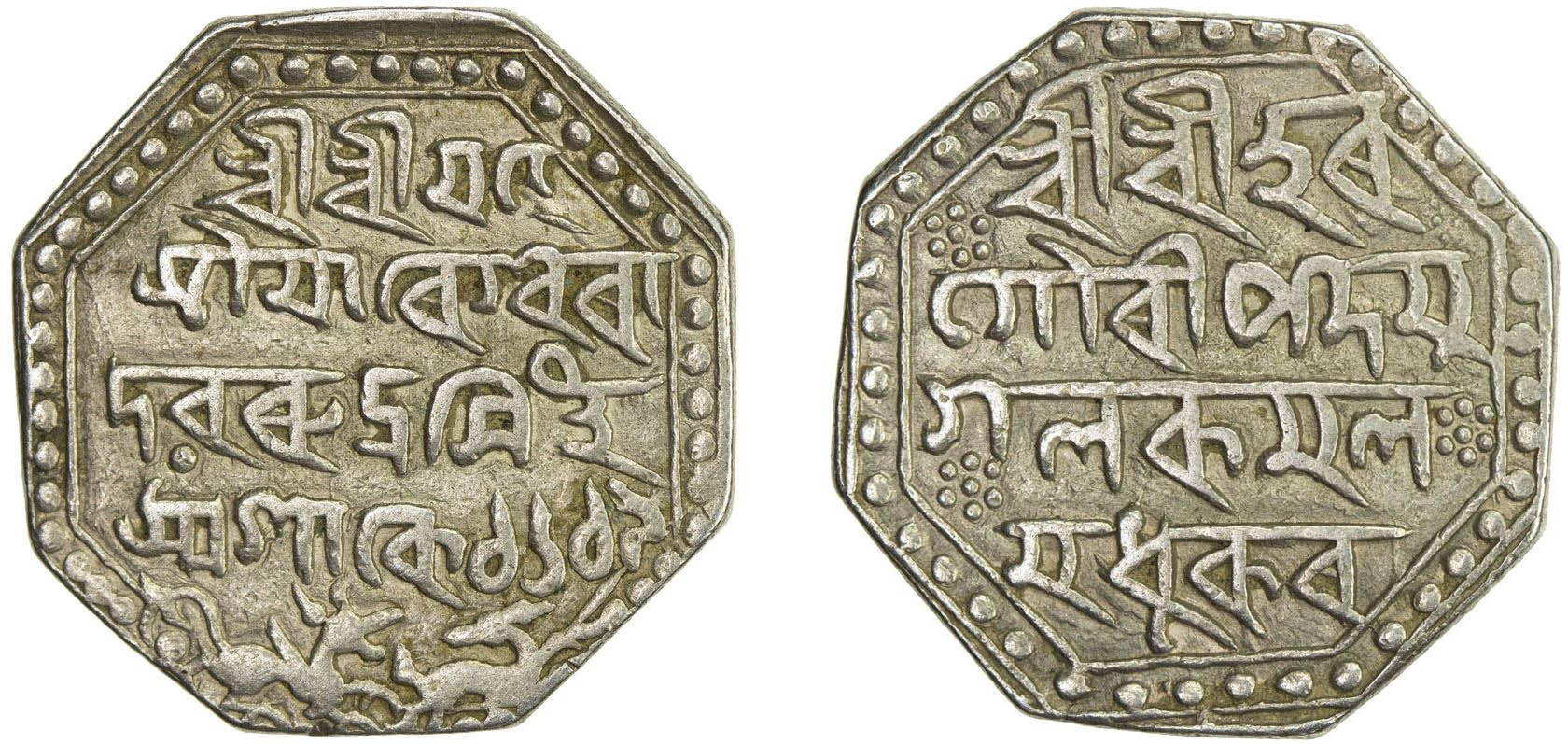
Rajmohuree of Rudra Singha, (issue date Saka 1619/1697 CE)

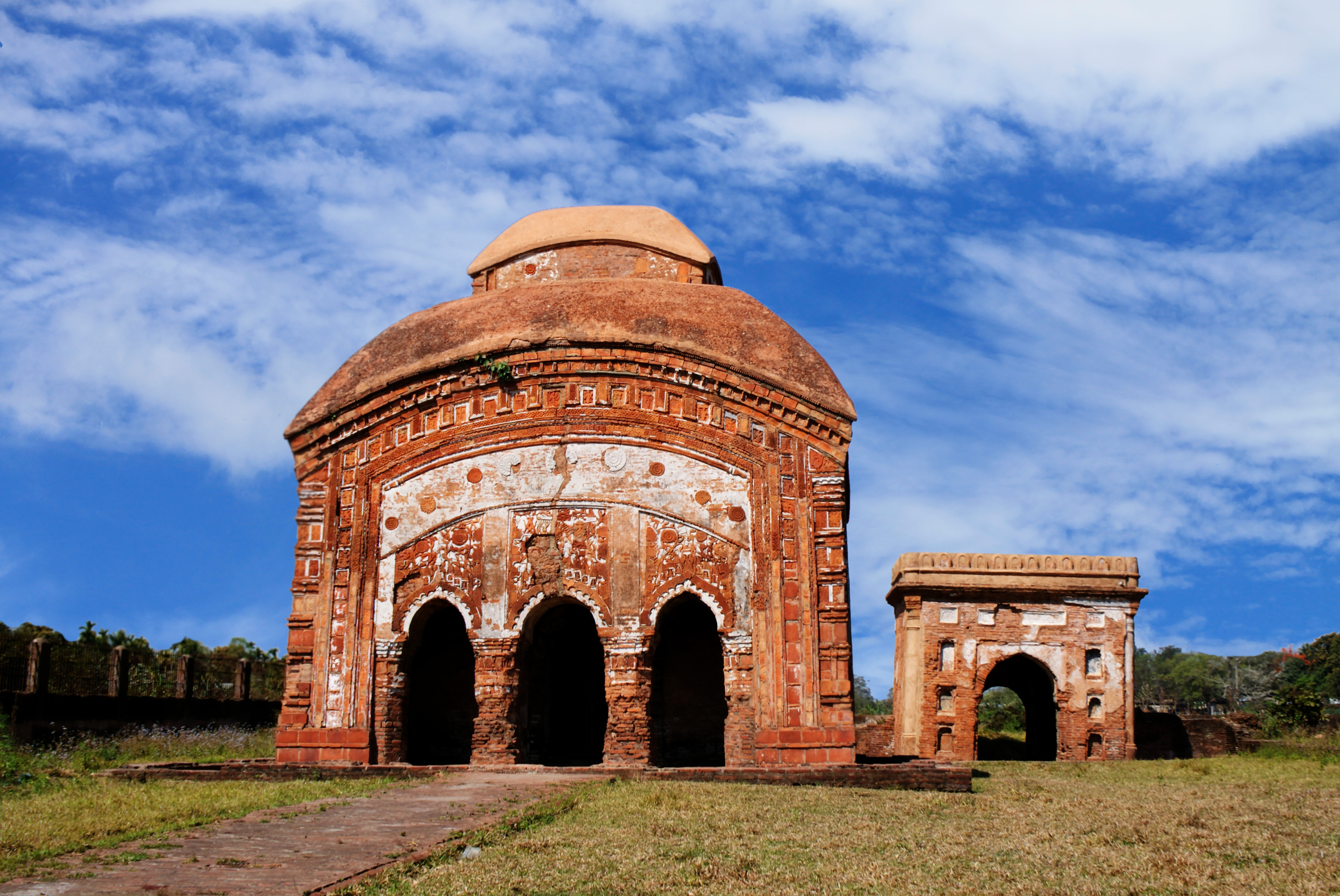
Ghanashyam House

He introduced Mughal dress to Ahom court and sent Brahman boys to study at great centers of learning in Bengal and Bihar. He did not fail to patronize local art and culture. He encouraged the culture of local folk music and dance and for this, he appointed officers like Gayan Barua. It is said that it was he,who for the first time had the Bihu celebrated in the palace courtyard and organised varied performances for full seven days including competitions of many kinds or sports and games and cultural shows For the promotion of sports and games he created offices like those of Sen-Chowa Barua, who was in charge of training of hawks and Kukura-Chowa Barua, in charge of training of cocks. Rudra Singha had created a new clan called khound consisting of some selected Sanyasis, for the duty of immersion of the ashes of the kings in the Ganges, they were employed as spies.

There were numbers of poets and scholars in his court. Of them the most notable was Kabiraj Chakravarty, who composed the famous drama Sankha-Chura-Bandha, and had translated the Abhiyana Sukuntalam and the Brahma-Vaivrata Purana into Assamese. He encouraged exchanges with other kingdoms and sent ambassadors to other royal houses in various parts of India. He created khels or official positions specifically for diplomacy, like Khaund, Kotoki, Bairagi, Doloi, Kakoti. He sent men to Delhi to learn music and Brahman boys to Gurukuls for Vedic and Sanskrit studies. He brought architects from outside for constructing the palace and other buildings in the new capital city, Rangpur. He introduced Mughal style dresses in the Ahom court.

=== Civil works ===
- In honour of the memory of his mother Joymoti Konwari, he dug the Joysagar Tank, India's largest man-made tank covering an area of 318 acres (1.29 km^{2}), including its four banks.
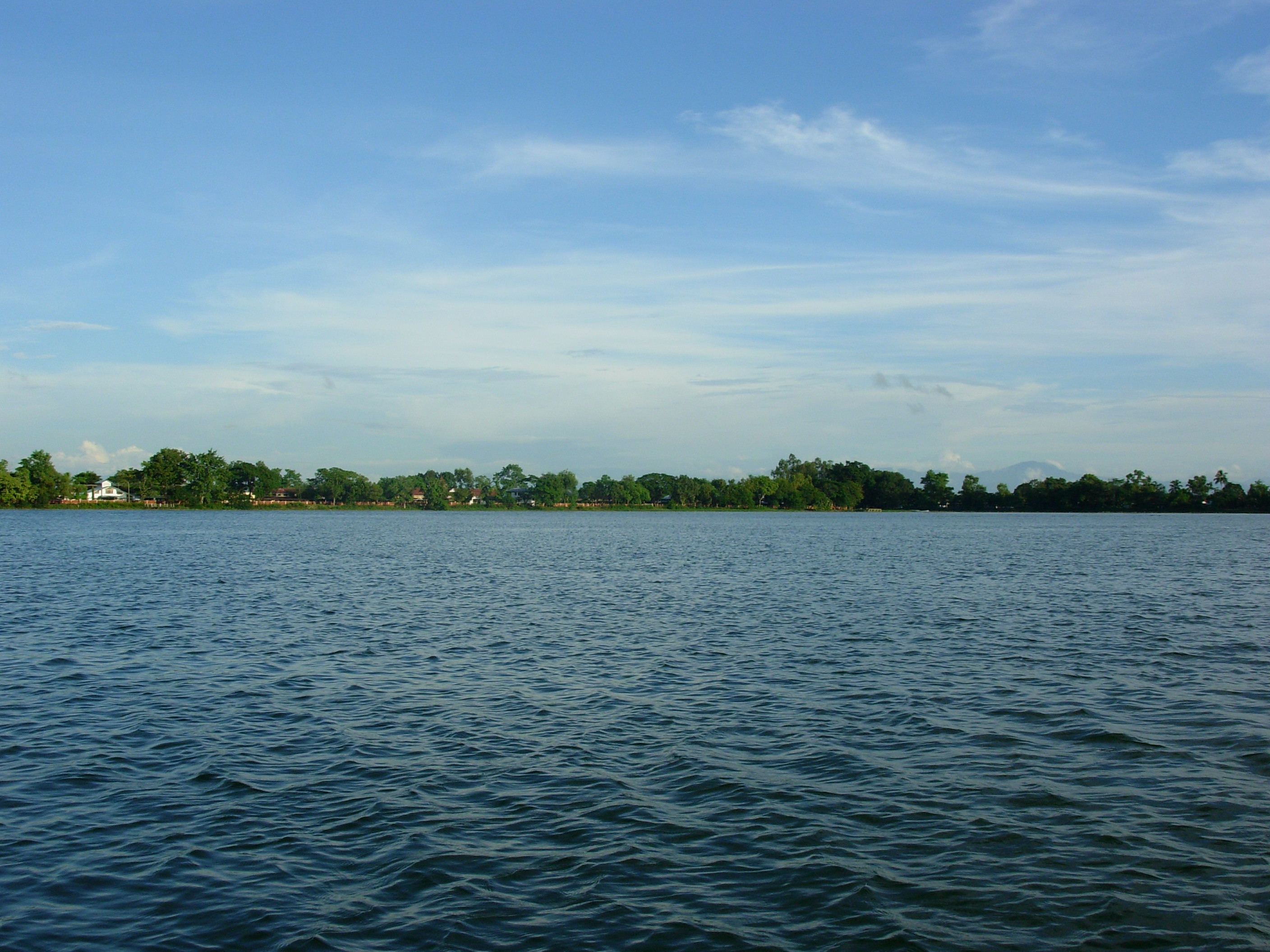
  Joysagar Lake in Sibsagar
- In 1703, he built the Rangnath Dol near the Borduar, or main gateway, on the way from the Joysagar Tank to the Talatal Ghar - for the offering of prayers to Shiva.
- Before the Ranganath Dol, a pyramid-shaped temple named Fakuwa Dol was constructed in 1703–04, for the celebration of Holi
- Numerous other architectural monuments and structures are credited to him, including the Namdang stone bridge of Gaurisagar, and the Kharikatia Ali (ali meaning road in Assamese) - leading from Kharikatia to Titabor. The Namdang bridge, a stone bridge 60m long, 6.5m wide, and 1.7m thick was built over the Namdang River in 1703. It is one of the best examples of the engineering workmanship and skill of the Ahom era. This bridge, on National Highway no.37, has been proudly providing service for the last 300 years.

== Death ==
Rudra Singha was seized with a dangerous illness during his stay at Guwahati camp. He died after eight days of his first attack of illness on 27 August 1714. From his death bed he injuncted, that all of his five sons should become kings in a consecutive manner.

== Character and legacy ==
The most striking events of his reign, which extended over seventeen eventful years, were the war against the Kachari and Jaintia kings. Although illiterate, Rudra Singha was possessed with of retentive memory and of exceptional intelligence. He is regarded as the greatest Ahom King. It is also said that he received the submission of all the tribes, and to have established extensive trade with Tibet, abandoning the policy of isolation of his predecessor to some extent, he encouraged intercourse between the different countries and sent envoys to them of India. He studied foreign customs and adopted those he thought were good. He imported many artificers from Bengal, and also established many schools for Brahmans.

== Issues and descendants ==
- Rudra Singha
  - Siva Singha
    - Ugra Singha, Tipam Raja
  - Pramatta Singha
    - Molou Gohain, Tipam Raja
    - Madhab Gohain Charing Raja
      - Kana Gohain
        - Bano Gohain
  - Barjana Gohian alias Mohanmala Gohain
    - Nal Santa
      - Lerilla Santa
      - Molia Santa
  - Rajeswar Singha
    - Ratneswar Gohain, Tipam Raja
      - Bijoy Barmura Gohain
        - Brajanath Gohain, Charing Raja
          - Purandar Singha
  - Lakshmi Singha
    - Gaurinath Singha
      - Jayanti Aideo
        - Narayani Aideo

== See also ==
- Ahom Dynasty
- Joy dol

== Bibiolography ==
- Gogoi, Lila (1986). The Buranjis, Historical Literature of Assam. the University of Michigan: Omsons Publications.
- Bhuyan, Suryya Kumar (1956). Studies in the Literature of Assam. Lawyer's Book Stall.
- Chaudhuri, Bikach (2016), "Tripura: A Peep into the Past", in Poddar, Satyadeo (ed.), History of Tripura: As Reflected in the Manuscripts, New Delhi: National Mission for Manuscripts, pp. 26–28
- Baruah, S.L. (1985), A Comprehensive History of Assam, Munshiram Manoharlal
- Sarkar, J. N. (1992), "THE MONARCHY AT ITS ZENITH", in Barpujari, H. K. (ed.), The Comprehensive History of Assam, vol. 2, Guwahati: Assam Publication Board, pp. 257–85
- Devi, Lakshmi (1968). Ahom-tribal Relations- A Political Study. Lawyer's Book Stall. pp. 210–261.
- Baruah, S. L. (1993), Last Days of Ahom Monarchy, New Delhi
- Gait, Sir Edward (1906) (1906). A History of Assam. Gauhati University: LBS Publications.
- Gogoi, Khagen (2017). Ahom warfare evolution nature and strategy. Gauhati University.
- Bhuyan, S K (1938). "Introduction". Tripura Buranji. Gauhati, Assam: Govt of Assam.
- Basu, NK (1970). Assam in the Ahom Age, 1228-1826: Being Politico-economic and Socio-cultural Studies. Sanskrit Pustak Bhandar.
- Sarma, Amulya Chandra (1986). Tai Ahom System of Government.
- Bhuyan, S.K. (1968). Tungkhungia Buranji Or A History Of Assam 1681-1826. Department of Historical and Antiquarian Studies in Assam.
