= Charu Singha, Charing Raja =

Ahom Prince

Charu Singha
- Charing Raja
- Died: c.1769
- Consort: Premada Sundari
- Spouse: Gauri
- Issue: Bhudhar Singha; Cherela Gohain; Bhakara Gohain; Japara Gohain
- House: Tungkhungia
- Dynasty: Ahom
- Father: Rajeswar Singha
- Mother: Rupavati

Charu Singha, Charing Raja (died c. 1769), also known as the "Maju Gohain", was an Ahom Prince and the heir apparent to his father King Rajeswar Singha.

Charu Singha was expected to succeed his father as king, but Kirti Chandra Borbarua installed his uncle, Lakshmi Singha, on the throne instead. Charu Singha was then mutilated and exiled to Namrup. He later joined the Mataks in the Moamoria rebellion against his uncle. He was secretly poisoned to death by the Mataks after they gained power.

== Ancestry and family ==
Charu Singha was the second son of King Rajeswar Singha. His elder brother was Kandura Gohain, while his younger brothers were Ratneswar Gohain and Pat Konwar. He was a member of the Tungkhungia line of the Ahom dynasty. His mother was Rupavati.

== Denial to the throne ==
Charu Singha's elder brother, Kandura Gohain, died during the reign of their father, and this Charu Singha became the Charing Raja (heir apparent).

Rajeswar Singha in May 1769 at Dergaon, and Charu Singha was expected to succeed him, despite Rudra Singha on his deathbed asking for all his sons to succeed him as king. However, Kirti Chandra Borbarua suspected Charu Singha of being involved in a previous assassination attempt against him, and this placed his uncle Lakshmi Singha on the throne instead. Charu Singha was subsequently mutilated and exiled to Namrup.

== Rebellion ==
The Moamorias (Mataks) had been preparing a rebellion against the Ahom monarchy since July 1769; they made alliances with all three of the exiled princes, Mohanmala Gohain, Ratneswar (Saru Gohain) and Charu Singha. They promised that if their rebellion was successful, they would place one of them on the throne.

In the battles between the royalists and the Moamorias, Charu Singha along with his brothers and uncle rode on elephants in the vanguard of the Moamoria army.

== Assassination ==
After the Mataks gained power, they secretly made Charu Singha and his brother Ratneswar drink poison, killing them.

== Personal life and family ==
Charu Singha's chief consort was Premada Sundari. At their joint command, Kavisekhar Bhattacharya composed the Harivamsa Pad, which was an erotic poem. Another of his wives was named Gauri.

He had four sons:

- Bhudhar Singha
- Cherela Gohain
- Bhakara Gohain
- Japara Gohain

== Bibliography ==
- Bhuyan, S.K. (1949), Anglo-Assamese Relations, 1771-1826, Department of Historical and Antiquarian Studies in Assam
- Bhuyan, S.K. (1975). Swargadeo Rajeswar Singha স্বৰ্গদেৱ ৰাজেশ্বৰসিংহ [Swargadeo Rajeswar Singha] (in Assamese). Guwahati: Assam Publication Board.
- Dutta, Sristidhar (1985), The Mataks and Their Kingdom Castes and Tribes of Assam (PDF), Chugh Publications
- Hazarika, Bijay Bhushan (1987), Political Life in Assam During the Nineteenth Century, Gian Publishing House
- Kalitā, Rameśa Candra (1992), Assam in the Eighteenth Century, Omsons Publications
