= Brajanath Gohain, Charing Raja =

Ahom Prince (1769–1818)

Brajanath Gohain
- Charing Raja
- Coin issued in the name of Brajanath, c.1818
- Born: c.1769
- Died: March 1818 (aged around 48–49)
- Issue: Purandar Singha; Radhanath Gohain; Gouri Priya Aye (Note: Gouri Priya Aye was either the daughter or sister of Brajanath; this is discussed below in a different note)
Names
- Ugranath Singha
- House: Tungkhungia
- Dynasty: Ahom
- Father: Bijoy Barmura Gohain

Brajanath Gohain, Charing Raja (c. 1769 – March 1818), also known by the Hindu name Ugranath Singha, or as Brajanath Konwar, was an Ahom Prince and briefly the de facto ruler of the Ahom Kingdom from February to March 1818 during the first reign of his son, Purandar Singha. A member of the Ahom dynasty and its cadet branch the Tungkhungia line, he was a great-grandson of King Rajeswar Singha.

Brajanath was the son of Bijoy Barmura Gohain; the family lived in exile due to his father's conspiracies against several Kings. In 1775, Brajanath had his ear slit, along with his father, which made both of them ineligible for the throne. During his exile in Bengal, Brajanath continued to press his father's claims to the throne, on the grounds that he was nearer in the line of succession than the King Kamaleswar Singha since Kamaleswar descended from a less senior branch of the family.

While in exile, he frequently tried to obtain assistance from the East India Company to support his claim to the throne but was unsuccessful. After this, he entered an alliance with King of Nepal Rana Bahadur Shah. He may have procured orders from the Qianlong Emperor permitting the army of Nepal to march through Tibet to invade Assam, but Bahadur's death in 1806 and the outbreak of the Anglo-Nepalese war in 1814 meant these plans did not materialise. Brajanath obtained the help of King Harendra Narayan of Cooch Behar and Robert Bruce for an invasion of Assam, but the British discovered the plot. Brajanath was then arrested before being released and returning to exile in Silmari, receiving a British pension.

Amid his continued opposition to Chandrakanta Singha, Ruchinath Burhagohain began to support Brajanath's claims to the throne; Brajanath subsequently returned to Guwahati after being permitted by the British to return. Ruchinath and Brajanath later marched to Jorhat in 1818 and defeated resistance, forcing Chandrakanta Singha to flee. Brajanath prevented his son Purandar from coming to Guwahati as he sought the throne for himself, but Brajanath's mutilation prevented him from becoming King. On the accession of his son as King, he became Charing Raja and Juvaraj. He issued coins in his name while in power, before he died of natural causes in March 1818.

== Ancestry and early life ==
Brajanath Gohain was born c. 1769. His father was Bijoy Barmura Gohain, and his grandfather was Ratneswar Gohain, Tipam Raja, the third son of Rajeswar Singha.

His father, Bijoy Barmura Gohain, was involved in several conspiracies during the reign of Lakshmi Singha, for which he was mutilated in 1775. This punishment was also extended to Brajanath who was only five or six years old at the time; Brajanath had his ear slit, making him ineligible for the throne.

== Exile ==
=== Claims to the throne ===
The Tungkhungia Buranji notes how Brajanath had shared with his father Barmura Gohain the "vicissitudes of a wanderer's life among the fastnesses of Cachar and Manipur." He took up the claims to the throne that his father had sought; arguing that his claim for kingship was on the grounds that he was nearer on the line of the succession than King Kamaleswar Singha. Brajanath was assisted by some of the relations of the deceased King, Gaurinath Singha, in his claims.

Brajanath eventually took shelter in Bengal in Silmari where he tried to obtain assistance from the East India Company and other parties to support his claim. His son, Durganath, was adopted by the two widows of Gaurinath Singha who had been living in retirement at Silmari with a pension of ₹100 from the British government. Following the death of the younger widow, Rani, in 1799, the Governor-General, Lord Wellesley fixed the surviving widow Kamaleswari Devi's pension at ₹80 a month to help her maintain Durganath.

In April 1806, Kamaleswari and Brajanath went to Calcutta and applied for assistance from the British government to remove Prime Minister Purnananda Burhagohain and place Brajanath as King. Kamaleswari said that Burhagohain "treacherously elevated another person [Kamaleswar Singha] and himself assumed the uncontrolled direction of public affairs and is still in power." She also asserted that Gaurinath Singha had nominated Brajanath as his successor, and took up his claims as she felt a sense of justice. In response to the petition, the government said that it possessed no authority over the Kingdom of Assam to decide any person's claim to the throne.

On 7 July 1806, Kamaleswari submitted another application to the government where she requested a force of troops to "regain possession" of her country. She asked the Governor-General not to oppose her movement through the districts of Rungpore or Goalpara. On 28 July, she sent another request for Brajanath to be granted a body of troops or grant him an allowance for his own maintenance of his livelihood as she could not provide for him as her allowance from the British government was insufficient. She also requested monetary help to return to Silmari.

Kamaleswari Devi's attempts at placing Brajanath on the throne were unsuccessful. In 1809, Brajanath was in Calcutta soliciting help from the Company. Three years later in 1812, Kamaleswari died, and Brajanath had no means of subsistence except for those who pitied his circumstance, which included the Rajas of Burdwan and Cooch Behar.

=== Foreign support ===
After failing to obtain support from the British government, Brajanath turned his attention to other possible supporters. He met with King Rana Bahadur Shah of Nepal in Benares, who promised to help support his bid for the throne. Brajanath accompanied Bahadur to Nepal where they entered an agreement in which Brajanath would pay 3 lakhs annually to the Nepalese King on the condition that he would place Brajanath on the throne. According to S.K. Bhuyan, Bahadur procured the orders of the Qianlong Emperor directing the Bhutias to permit the Nepal army to proceed through their country to Assam. (Note: Bhuyan records the source for this as E. G. Glazier's "Further Notes on Rungpore Records", but highlights that the source does not give the name of the Ahom prince; Bhuyan contests it could not have been anyone other than Brajanath as he was " "the only claimant who made such persistent efforts from outside Assam.") However, Bahadur's death in 1806 and the outbreak of the Anglo-Nepalese War in 1814 meant this plan did not end up materialising.

== 1814 attempt to seize the throne ==
In January 1814, Brajanath returned to Bengal where he informed John Digby, the collector of Rungpore, of his intention to pay off all of Rausch's Assam debts if the British placed him on the throne. Digby was nearly inclined to accept the offer and informed the government that the "usurper's" force consisted of 14 companies each with about 50 "undisciplined" and "ill-armed" sepoys.

Brajanath obtained the help of King Harendra Narayan of Cooch Behar, who had married into Brajanath's family. (Note: Bhuyan states that the Raja had married Brajanath's sister, however Cooch Behar genealogical records indicate that he had actually married Brajanath's daughter.) He was also supported by Robert Bruce. Officers and favourites of the King were tasked with raising men for Brajanath in Cooch Behar, Mymensingh and Rungpore, while Bruce dispatched some of his Burkendazes to Murshidabad to also support Brajanath. On 12 March 1814, Brajanath applied to the Magistrate of Rungpore, David Scott, for a passport to enter Assam with a force of around 150–200 men; this request was rejected on 1 April.

The Commissioner of Cooch Behar, Norman Macleod, received reports of Harendra Narayan's attempts to place Brajanath on the throne. Macleod described this as a violation of Narayan's agreement with the British government which forbade an alliance with a foreign chief. Macleod also argued the "present ruler" Chandrakanta Singha was "recognised by the English government". He went on to argue that the giving of "aid or countenance" to Brajanath with the aim of the "forcible deposition of the said Rajah" was "little short" of "partial hostility" against the British government. Macleod also worried that by supporting the cause of Brajanath, it may have alienated the Assam government to despatch a force through Bhutan to invade Cooch Behar which the British were treaty bound to protect. Subsequently, the government directed the commissioner to warn Narayan of his actions, and asked the magistrate to place "under restraint" Brajanath and his "principal adherents".

== Arrest and return to exile ==
In late April 1814, Brajanath was taken into custody and voluntarily made an appearance before David Scott. His followers dispersed upon receiving further orders. Three of Brajanath's principal adherents were arrested and Bruce was granted bail following his appearance on 25 April. Bruce admitted to having given Brajanath a few Sarkars and other people, as well as money in support of himself and his followers which he suggested was the practice of merchants to support the wants of emigrants of rank who could be recalled to power in their country. Bruce was left off with a warning, as was Brajanath whose subsequent conduct was found to be "satisfactory".

Brajanath continued to live at Silmari where he was granted a British pension. He received this until he eventually left the territory of the company.

== Ruchinath Burhagohain invitation ==
=== Background ===
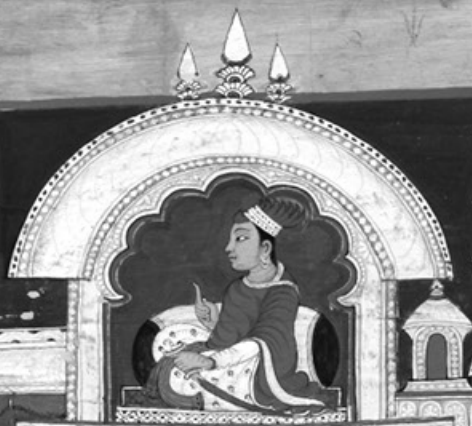
Brajanath prevented his son, Purandar Singha (pictured), from travelling to Guwahati, in hopes that Brajanath himself could accede to the throne, despite his childhood mutilation.

Chandrakanta Singha's peace with the Burmese, his support of Badan Chandra Borphukan, and his refusal to go to Guwahati when the Burmese army had approached, raised the suspicions of the Burhagohain, Ruchinath (son of Purnananda Burhagohain). Subsequently, Ruchinath took up the cause of Brajanath's claim to the throne, who was then in Silmari at the time.

After leaving Jorhat, Ruchinath went to Guwahati where he remained with a large force. Ruchinath and his supporters were reluctant to place Brajanath on the throne, as according to Ahom customs, physical defects disqualified a person from Kingship. Due to this, they instead decided to place Brajanath's 10 year-old son, Purandar Singha, on the throne. Jaggnath Dhekial Phukan went to Rungpore to invite Purandar back to Assam become King. Brajanath refused to take Purandar with him to Guwahati, in hopes that he himself might be crowned King. For the time being, Ruchinath and the Phukan went along with this as the cooperation of Brajanath was seen to be far more effective than his young son, despite the ineligibility of Brajanath to become King.

=== Invasion ===
At the end of May 1817, the Phukan appeared before David Scott in application for military assistance and if that failed then firearms. A few days later Brajanath himself appeared and was interviewed by Scott. He explained that he himself would have liked to remain in Bengal, but it would be difficult for his children since they were only allowed to intermarry with certain families in Assam. He also expression his intention to accept the support of Ruchinath and press his claims to the throne. On 31 May, the board permitted Brajanath to return to Assam but restricted him from taking any armed forces from company territory or from purchasing firearms in provinces of the company, in order to maintain neutrality in the issue of the claims to the throne and to abstain from interfering in Assam.

Brajanath then proceeded to Guwahati where he spent months organising and equipping his forces of Hindustanis and local levies. Upon his return to Guwahati, Brajanath dressed a native sepoy in the full uniform of a Firinghee Captain as a make-believe in order to secure more recruits for his claim. Ruchinath and Brajanath then marched to Jorhat, which caused to Chandrakanta flee to Rangpur. Luku Dekaphukan was then left in charge of Jorhat, but resistance under him was easily defeated and Dekaphukan was killed. The victors were successful in convincing royalist troops to join their cause. On 17 February 1818, they triumphantly entered Jorhat. Chandrakanta Singha was then taken to Jorhat after he assured his fealty and allegiance to the new leadership, and then was stripped of power and banished to Taratali. Ruchinath and his supporters sent for Purandar and he arrived in time; he was then proclaimed as sovereign. A few days prior to this, Chandrakanta Singha had had his right ear sliced off by Biswanath Gohain, making him ineligible for the throne.

== Charing Raja and de facto rule ==
Due to the young age of his son, Brajanath was the de facto ruler and virtually exercised the power of a sovereign in his capacity as the Juvaraj. When he reached Jorhat, Brajanath immediately ordered the striking of coins in his name, in anticipation that he himself could be proclaimed King.

Gohain died of natural causes in March 1818.

== Family ==
Brajanath had issue including:

- Purandar Singha
- Radhanath Gohain

He was also the father (or possibly the brother) of Gouri Priya Aye, also known as Assami Aye, who married Maharaja Harendra Narayan around 1814. She died in November 1893 in Benares.

== Bibliography ==
- Bhuyan, S.K. (1949), Anglo-Assamese Relations, 1771-1826, Department of Historical and Antiquarian Studies in Assam
- Bhuyan, S.K. (1968), Tungkhungia Buranji Or A History Of Assam 1681-1826, Department of Historical and Antiquarian Studies in Assam
- Amin, Md Talha (2026), Chandrakanta Singha: Era of the Burmese Invasion of Assam;or, The Comprehensive History of Assam, Union Book Publication, Guwahati
- Hazarika, Bijay Bhushan (1987), Political Life in Assam During the Nineteenth Century, Gian Publishing House
- Gait, Edward (1926), History of Assam, Calcutta, Thacker, Spink
- Baruah, Swarna Lata (1993), Last Days of Ahom Monarchy A History of Assam from 1769-1826, Munshiram Manoharlal Publishers
- Regmi, D.R. (1975), Modern Nepal: Rise and growth in the eighteenth century.
