= Bhudhar Singha =

Ahom Prince and claimant to the throne

- Died: c.1773
- Spouse: daughter of Duwaliya Chetia Phukan
- House: Tungkhungia
- Dynasty: Ahom
- Father: Charu Singha

Bhudhar Singha (died c. 1773), also referred to as Bhudhar Gohain, was an Ahom Prince and claimant to the Ahom throne. A member of the Ahom dynasty and its cadet branch the Tungkhungia line, he was the grandson of King Rajeswar Singha.

== Life ==
=== Ancestry ===
Bhudhar Singha was the son of Charu Singha, Charing Raja. He was a member of the Tungkhungia line of the Ahom dynasty as the grandson of King Rajeswar Singha.

=== Family ===
Charu Singha's main consorts were Premada Sundari and Gauri. Bhudhar Singha's biological mother was not recorded in chronicles, but it was known that his stepmother was Gauri:

Bhudhar was married to a daughter of the Duwaliya Chetia Phukan:

=== 1773 attempt to seize the throne ===
==== Background ====
After the Moamoria rebellion, Lakshmi Singha recovered his throne. However, the Morans had seized control of the kingdom for several months which undermined the authority of the Ahom monarchy. Following this, princes with ambitions began conspiring to overthrow the monarch ad seize the throne for themselves.

In 1773, Singha made an attempt to seize the throne from his great-uncle, King Lakshmi Singha. He joined with forces Bhadrasen Borbarua in the conspiracy. Singha's stepmother, Gauri, who was a daughter of Burhagohain family, maintained secret communications with Dhanai, an attendant in Singha's household.

==== Plots ====
The conspirators developed three alternative plans in their plots to overthrow Lakshmi Singha:

1. Singha approached Bhakati, an attendant of Molou Gohain, the Tipam Raja, and attempted to persuade her to poison him, and offered to make her the chief queen in return. They also intended to poison Lokenath Gohain, son of Lakshmi Singha. He also expressed that the King and certain Queens would have severe punishments if he gained power.
2. An armed seizure: to capture the King and his ministers by force using armed supporters
3. A regional uprising: if the first two plans failed, then they would travel downstream and recruit the Salal Gohain and seize control of Guwahati before advancing against the King.

Gauri persuaded Dhanai to discover the full details of Singha's plan, and after Dhanai swore secrecy, Singha disclosed his entire plan to him. Subsequently, Dhanai revealed everything to the Kalita Phukan. The Phuakn then consulted the King and investigated the allegations; he verified the handwriting of Singha and presented the evidence to the King.

=== Aftermath and legacy ===
==== Execution ====
Lakshmi Singha consulted his principal ministers and decided to punish the conspirators. Both Bhudhar Singha and Bhadrasen Borbarua were executed.

==== Punishment of those involved ====
Around 200 people were implicated in the conspiracy of Singha. The king ordered various punishments including execution, blinding, dismissal from positions and a reduction in social status. Singha's father-in-law was imprisoned, and Dhanai received physical punishment but was then released.
