= Charing Raja =

Traditionally heir apparent to the Ahom throne

- Member of: Ahom dynasty
- Appointer: Ahom King
- Term length: At the discretion of the sovereign or until accession as sovereign
- Formation: 14th century
- First holder: Chao Pulai
- Abolished: 1826

The Charing Raja, formerly the Garhgaoyan Raja, was a title traditionally given to the heir apparent to the Ahom throne. The position was established by King Sukhrangpha, and the Charing Raja administered the region of Charing. The Charing Raja was usually the first in the line of succession, followed by the Tipam Raja and Namrup Raja.

== History and role ==
=== Background ===
King Sukhrangpha (r.1332–1364) established the position of the Charing Raja. Early in his reign, he faced a threat from his youngest half-brother Chao Pulai (or Tai Sulai). Chao Pulai conspired to oust his elder brother as King. However, the plot was discovered, and Chao Pulai, as the son of Kamata princess Bhajani, fled to Kamata kingdom. However, King Sukhrangpha had already received intelligence that his regime was unpopular among certain sections of the kingdom, and he was doubtful of the loyalty of his troops. To avoid confrontation, he then reconciled with Chao Pulai.

Sukhrangpha subsequently appointed Chao Pulai as the Charing Raja. The reasoning behind the appointment was to let the prince gain experience in administration before eventually ascending the throne.

=== Responsibilities and Ahom administration ===
The Charing Raja administered the region of Charing. The principal duty of the Charing Raja was to govern the localities assigned to him and administer justice.

Below the Charing Raja, the Tipam Raja was the next in the line of succession, followed by the Namrup Raja. The princes and the nearest relatives of the King were appointed as Governors in these areas, and so were given the title of Raja.

Under the Ahom system, the mel was where a state dinner was given by kings to their ministers and principal officers, where important political affairs were discussed. Mels also meant estates granted to sons and relatives of the monarch, and it was introduced as a type of financial support for members of the royal family; this gave rise to three hereditary estates at Charing, Tipam, and Namrup. Mels were also granted to other relations, which led to the other princely rankings of Sarumelia Raja and Majumelia Raja.

The Charing Phukan managed the affairs of the Charing Raja.

== Selected events ==
=== Gadadhar Singha refusal ===
Prince Gadadhar Singha refused to take the position of Charing Raja, instead intending to depose the Lora Raja and become King himself. He eventually acceded to the throne as King Gadadhar Singha.

=== Brajanath as Charing Raja ===
Due to the young age of his son Purandar Singha, Brajanath appointed himself Charing Raja and acted as the de facto ruler of the Ahom Kingdom until his death in March 1818. Brajanath had previously intended to become King himself, but his mutilation prevented him from doing so.

== Partial list ==
Name	Charing Raja under (regnal dates)	Relation to Monarch	Ref
Chao Pulai	Sukhrangpha r.(1332–1364)	Half-brother	
Suleng Deoraja	Suhungmung r.(1497–1539)	Son	
Chakradhwaj Singha	Sutamla r.(1648–1663)	Cousin	
Name unknown	Ramdhwaj Singha r.(1672–1674)	Younger brother	
Jambor Gohain	Gadadhar Singha r.(1681–1696)	Younger brother	
Pramatta Singha	Siva Singha r.(1714–1744)	Younger brother	
Madhab Gohain	Pramatta Singha r.(1744–1751)	Son	
Charu Singha	Rajeswar Singha r.(1751–1769)	Son	
Gaurinath Singha	Lakshmi Singha r.(1769–1780)	Son	
Kadamdighala Gohain	Gaurinath Singha r.(1780–1794)	Distant cousin	
Kadamdighala Gohain	Kamaleswar Singha r.(1795–1811)	Father	
Chandrakanta Singha	Kamaleswar Singha r.(1795–1811)	Brother	
Brajanath Gohain	Purandar Singha r.(1818–1819)	Father	
Mantan	Jogeswar Singha r.(1821–1822)	Younger brother	
Kameswar Singha	Purandar Singha r.(1833–1838)	Son	
Kandarpeswar Singha	None (monarchy abolished)		

== See also ==
- Ahom dynasty
- Prince of Wales
- Dauphin of France

== Bibliography ==
- Bhuyan, S.K. (1949), Anglo-Assamese Relations, 1771-1826, Department of Historical and Antiquarian Studies in Assam
- Hazarika, Bijay Bhushan (1987), Political Life in Assam During the Nineteenth Century, Gian Publishing House
- Gait, Edward (1926), History of Assam, Calcutta, Thacker, Spink
- Baruah, Swarna Lata (1993), Last Days of Ahom Monarchy A History of Assam from 1769-1826, Munshiram Manoharlal Publishers
- Barbaruah, Hiteswar (1981), Ahomar-Din or A History of Assam under the Ahoms., Guwahati: Publication Board of Assam
- Sarma, Amulya Chandra (1986), Tāi Āhom System of Government, B.R. Publishing Corporation
- Saikia, Yasmin (1999), A Name Without a People Searching to be Tai-Ahom in Modern India, University of Wisconsin
- Bhuyan, Surya Kumar (1957), Atan Buragohain and His Times, Lawyer's Book Stall
- Bhuyan, S.K. (1968), Tungkhungia Buranji Or A History Of Assam 1681-1826, Department of Historical and Antiquarian Studies in Assam
