= Pat Konwar =

Ahom Prince

- Born: c.1751
- Died: c.1788 (aged 37); Ahom kingdom
- Issue: 3 sons, including Bapi Gohain
- House: Tungkhungia
- Dynasty: Ahom
- Father: Rajeswar Singha

Pat Konwar (c. 1751 – c. 1788) was an Ahom Prince, military commander, and claimant to the Ahom throne. A member of the Ahom dynasty and its cadet branch the Tungkhungia line, he was the youngest son of King Rajeswar Singha.

During the Moamoria rebellion, Konwar led a military expedition against the rebels. He declared himself as the rightful King, and exercised some sovereign authority for around six months, before being killed by the rebels.

== Ancestry, family and early life ==
Pat Konwar was the youngest and fourth son of King Rajeswar Singha. His elder brothers were Kandura Gohain, Charu Singha, and Ratneswar Gohain. He was a member of the Tungkhungia line of the Ahom dynasty. He was named Pat Konwar because he was born around the time his father acceded to the Pat Ghar.

== Exile ==
After the death of his father in 1769, Pat Konwar along with his elder brothers Charu Singha and Ratneswar were exiled to Namrup by their uncle, the new king, Lakshmi Singha.

== Military expedition (1788) ==
=== Background ===
Following the outbreak of another Moamoria rebellion, Pat Konwar recruited 700 men from Tipam. Other exiled princes, Kadamdighala Gohain, Bijoy Barmura Gohain, and Japara Gohain, along with some deposed officers, lent their support to him. Prime minister Purnananda Burhagohain also supported him, despite suspecting that Konwar had ulterior motives.

=== Battles with the rebels ===
Konwar moved to the Darika River to prepare an attack on Rangpur, and left Japara Gohain in command at Garhgaon. Purnananda established a fort at Gaurisagar, while 8,000 troops arrived from the Nara country at his request to help defeat the rebels. Konwar eventually quarrelled with one of the other exiled princes, which meant they could no longer act together.

=== Pretender to the throne ===
The messengers of King Gaurinath Singha revealed to the prime minister that Pat Konwar had addressed a letter to Gaurinath in which he called himself the "reigning monarch" and Gaurinath as the "fugitive king". Subsequently, Purnananda withdrew his support to Pat Konwar.

Konwar acted as King by taking the royal title and appointing his own officers. He appointed the brother of the Barhatatola of Bakata as his Borbarua, and later appointed Tekela Barua his Borgohain. Surya Kumar Bhuyan wrote that Konwar excercised royal authroity for around six months.

=== Death and aftermath ===
The Moamorias counterattacked Pat Konwar's forces, and surrounded his fort at Darika in July/August 1788. Konwar fled, but was captured at Lechang and was killed by the rebels. Gaurinath's men recovered his body and placed it in a maidam beside the Darika river.

Konwar's followers and ministers subsequently declared his son as the king. Kaliman Abhaypuriya Rajkhowa led the effort and held a fort at Safrai. However, the Moamorias later attacked and killed the prince, queens, and some soldiers.

== Issue ==
Konwar had three sons, including Bapi Gohain.
