= Joysagar Tank =

Reservoir in Assam, India

- Joysagar Borpukhuri
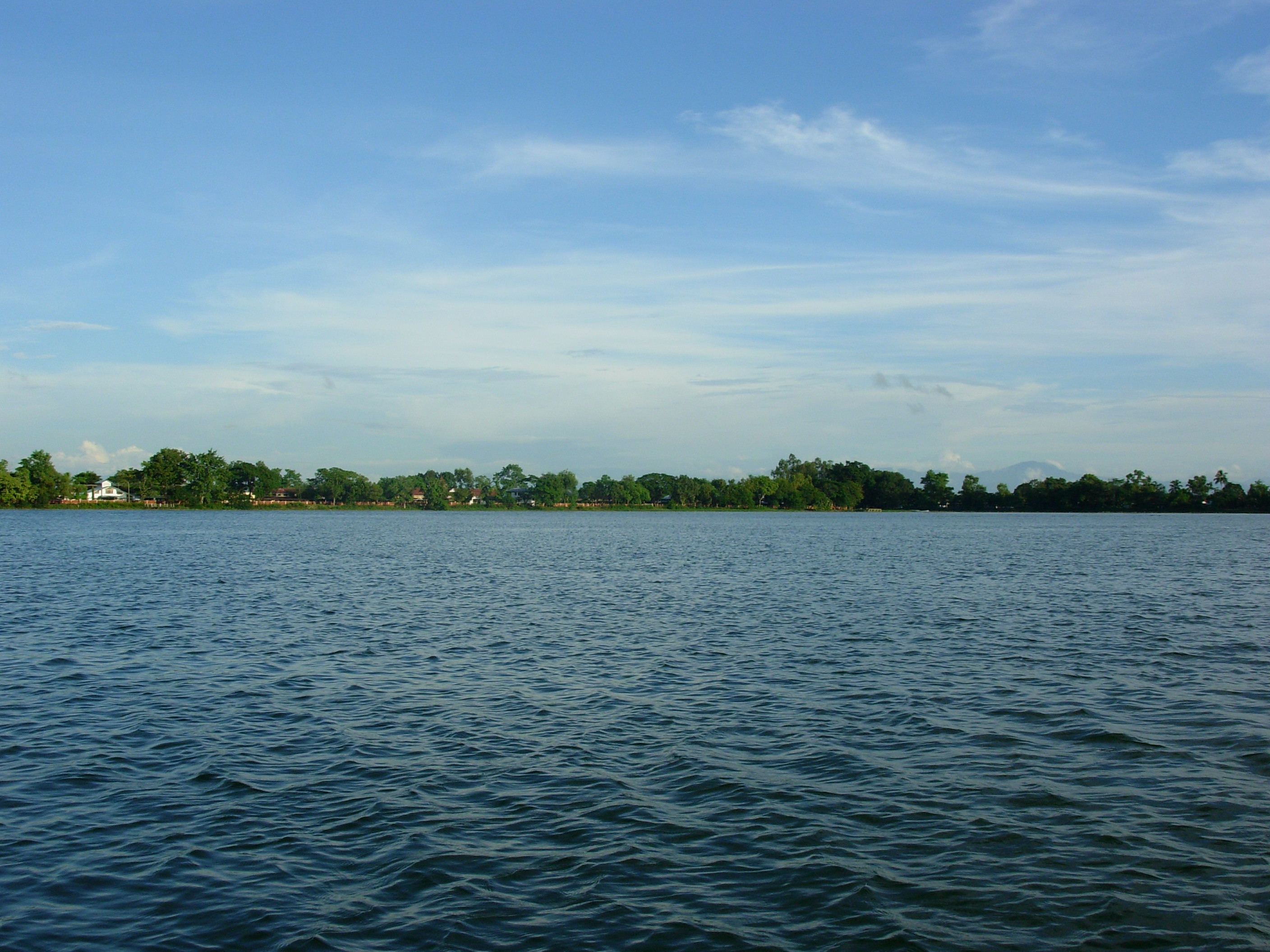
- Interactive map of Joysagar Tank
- Location: Sivasagar District, Assam, India
- Coordinates: 26.58°N 94.41°E
- Type: Tank
- Built: 1697; 329 years ago by Rudra Singha
- Surface area: 108 acres (0.44 km^{2})

Joysagar Tank, also known as Joysagar Borpukhuri, is a large tank located at Sivasagar district, Assam, India. The lake is 5 km from the center of the Sivasagar city. The lake has historical significance.

== History ==
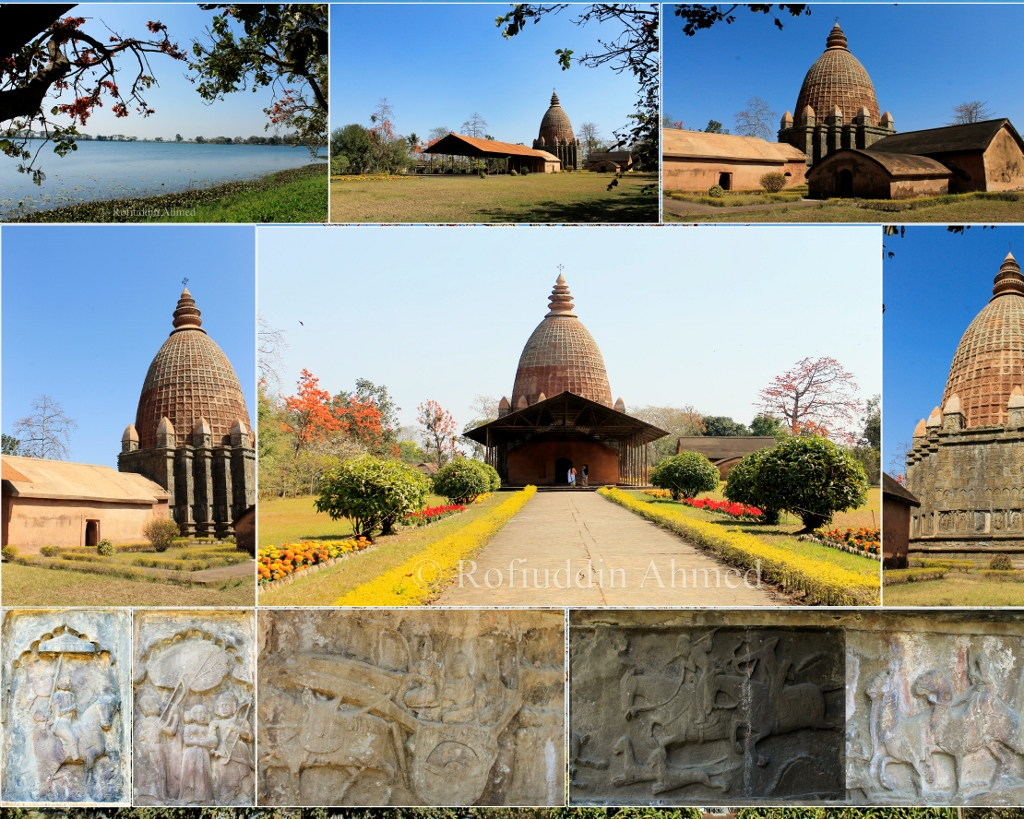
Vishudol Joysagar

The lake was made during the reign of the renowned Ahom king, Rudra Singha. About 5 km from the Sivasagar township, three set of temples are located on the northern bank of the lake. The most renowned among these sanctuaries is the Joy dol, which is also known as the Keshavnaryan Vishu dol. As the name suggests, the sanctuary is devoted to Lord Vishnu and his numerous manifestations. This lake was formed in 1697, in just 45 days, in the memory of Joymoti Konwari, mother of Rudra Singha. The lake covers an area of 318 acres (1.28 square km). The water level of the lake is 14 feet higher from ground level.

== Tourism ==
The lake attracts international tourists. The northern bank of the lake has many temples which are visited by the locals every day. Joysagar is one of the most famous tourist attractions of Sivasagar and is visited by people in large numbers. During winters, Joysagar lake becomes home to hundreds of migratory birds. During this time bird watching is an important activity.

== See also ==
- List of lakes in India
- List of lakes of Assam
- Sivasagar Tank (Borpukhuri)
