= Tungkhungia Buranji =

Indian chronicle

Tungkhungia Buranji is a Buranji chronicle comprising the records of Tungkhungia Ahom kings mainly from the reign of Rajeswar Singha to Kamaleswar Singha, (1751–1806). It was written by Srinath Duara Borbarua, an Ahom cabinet minister and it was compiled after four years of his Borbaruaship on March 6, 1804.

== Bibliography ==
- Baruah, S L (1985), A Comprehensive History of Assam, Munshiram Manoharlal
- Neog, Dimbeswar (1962). New light on History of Asamiya literature including an account of its antecedents.
