= Manikarneswar Devalaya =

Temple dedicated to mother god Shiva

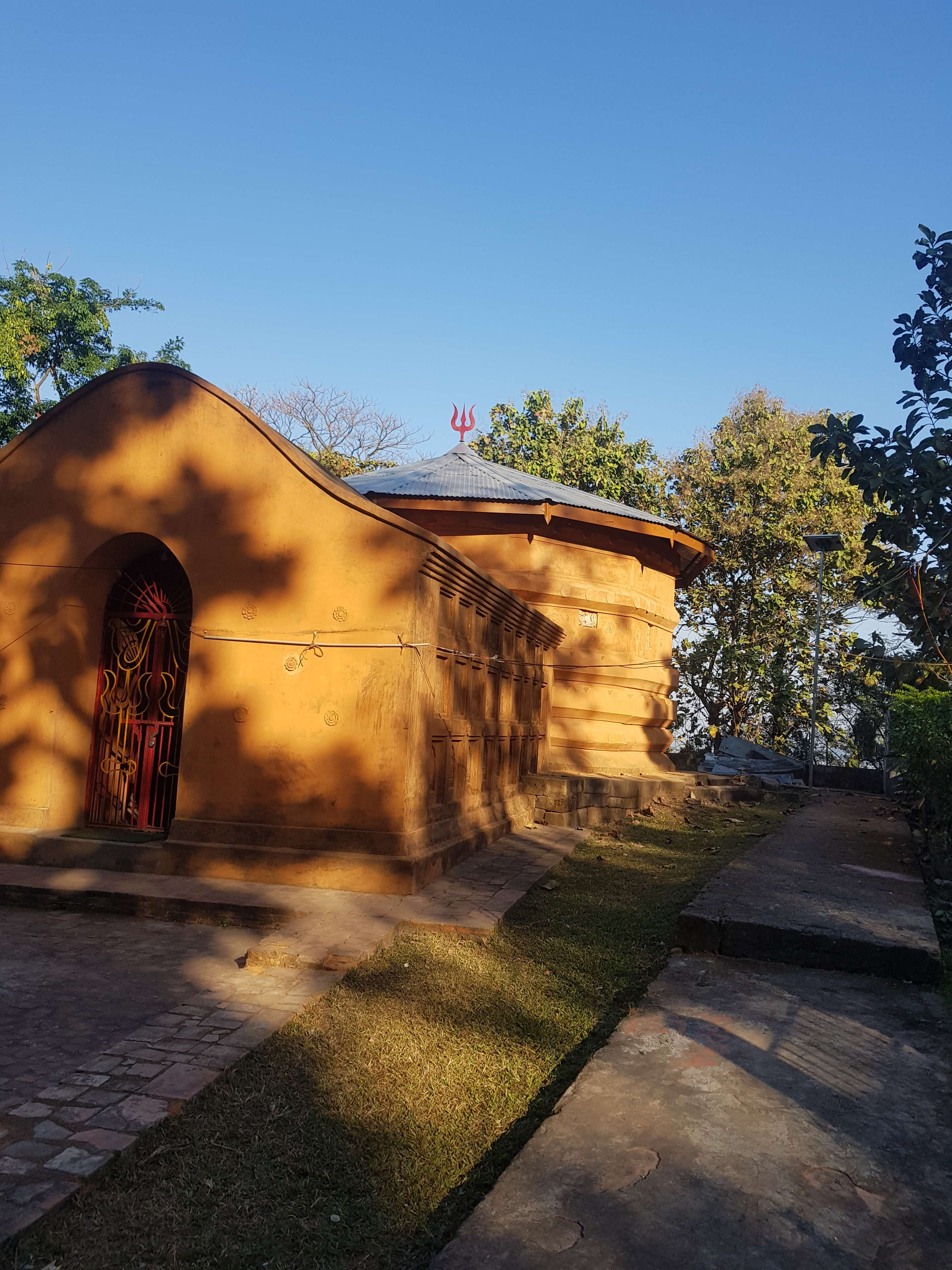

Religion
- Affiliation: Hinduism
- Deity: Shiva

Location
- State: Assam
- Country: India
- Interactive map of Manikarneswar Devalaya
- Coordinates: 26.2071353°N 91.7480039°E

Architecture
- Creator: Rajeswar Singha
- Completed: 1755; 271 years ago
- Monument: 1
- Inscriptions: 1782

Manikarneswar Devalaya at the top of Manikhalaya hill in Assam, North Guwahati is a temple dedicated to god Shiva. The present brick temple was built by Ahom King Rajeswar Singha in 1755 C.E. upon a star-shaped ground plan of a stone temple of the 10–11th century and made arrangements for regular worship at this temple.

The temple's shikhara got destroyed in the earthquake of 1897 and is currently roofed with a tin.

== Legend ==
According to local legend, when god Shiva was roaming with the body of his wife Sati after Daksha yajna, he rested under a bel tree situated on the Manisaila hill. According to another legend from Kalika purana, after Narakasura looted invaluable precious stones from beneath the sea, heaven, and earth, he deposited them in the shape of a mountain. The mountain thus came to be known as 'Manikarneswar'.

== Gallery ==
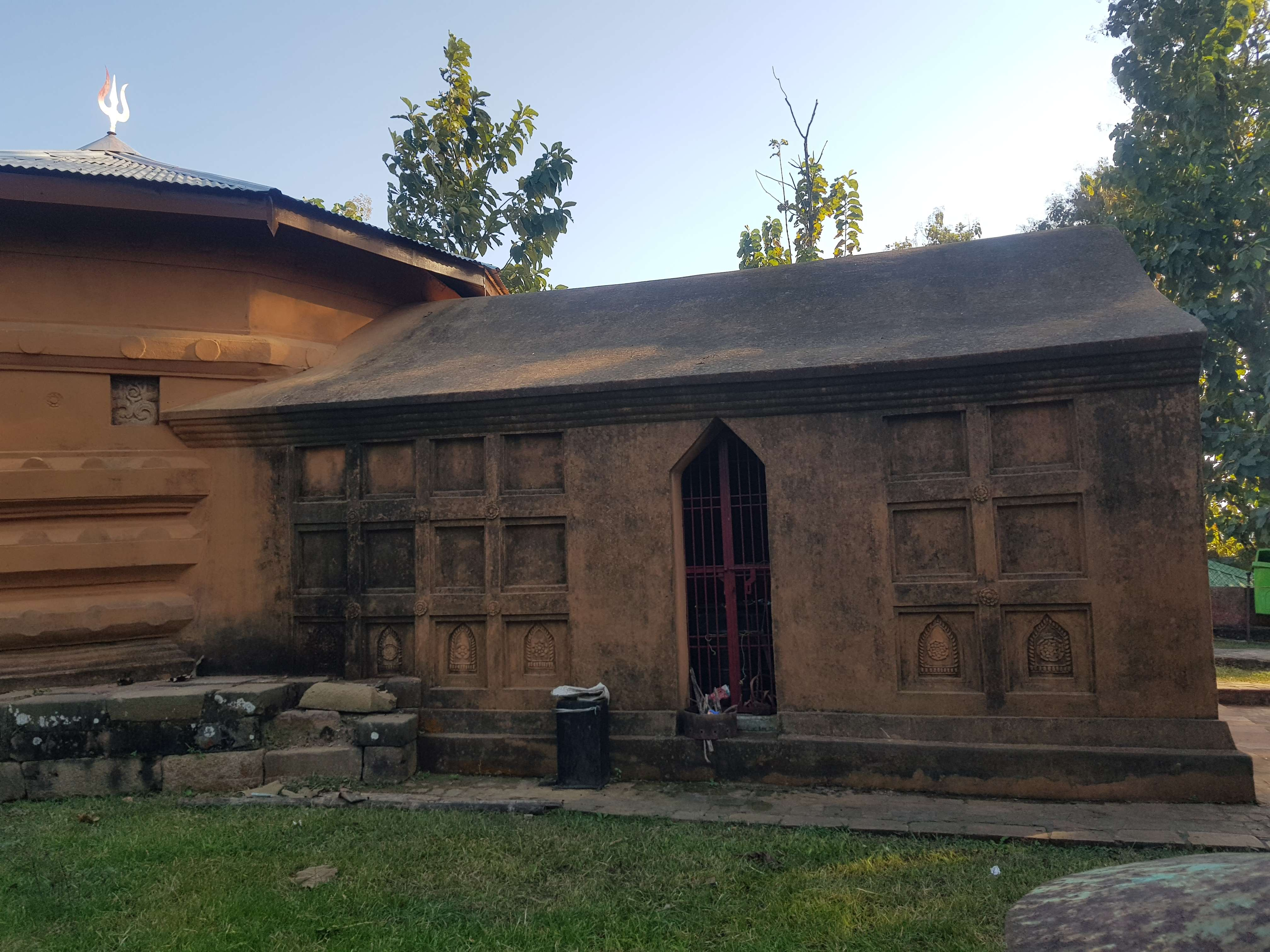
Side view of the Manikarneswar Devalaya.

== Bibliography ==
- Chaudhury, P.D. (1964), Archaeology in Assam: An Introduction, Assam (India): Government of Assam in the State Department of Archaeology
- Sharma, Navamallika (2015), Ancient temples of guwahati city religious activities and socio economic life pattern of the temple serving people a study in social geography, Gauhati University
