= Joy dol =

Temple in Assam

Kesavaraya Vishnu Dol
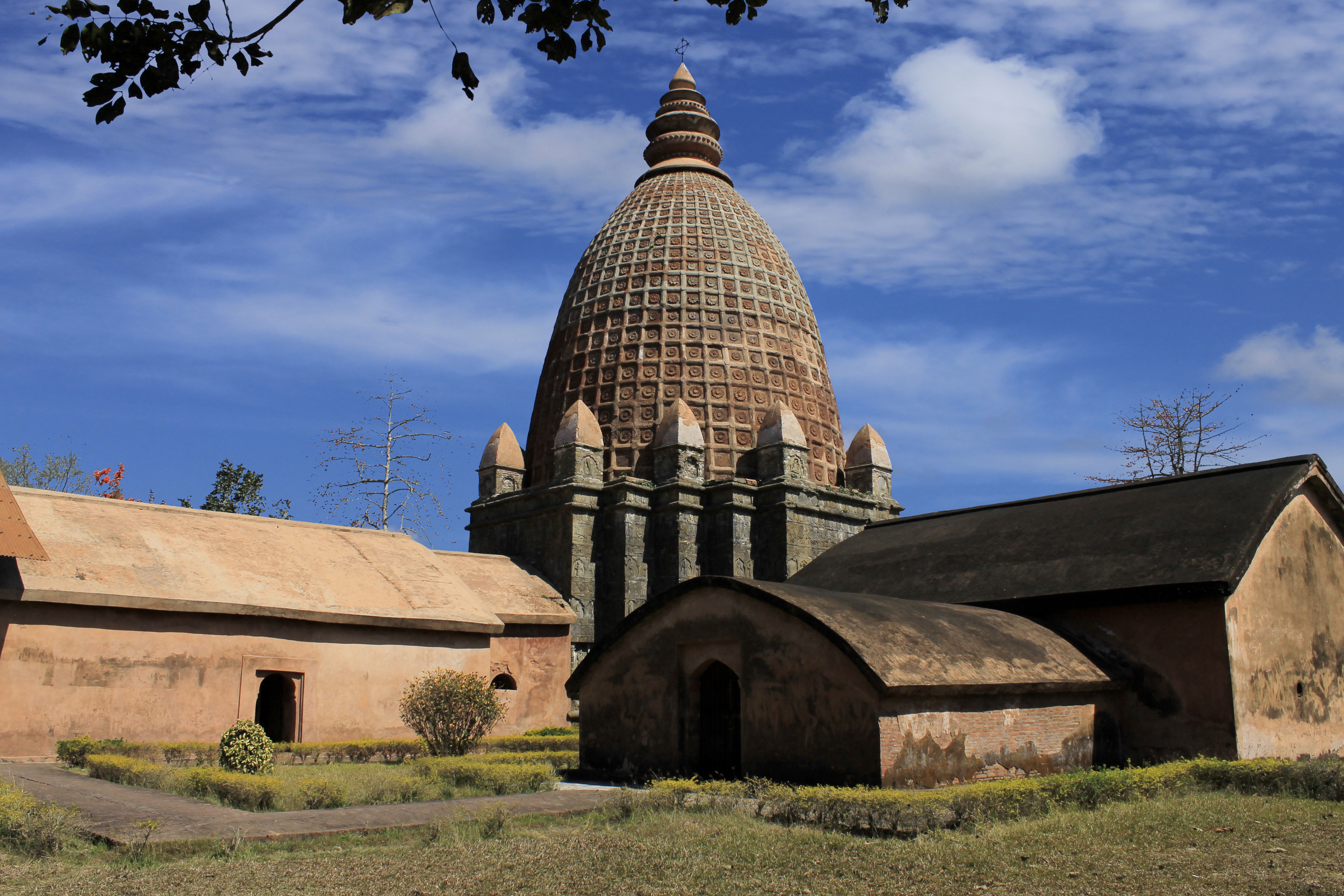
- Joy dol

Religion
- Affiliation: Hinduism
- District: Sivasagar
- Deity: Kesavaraya Visnu

Location
- State: Assam
- Country: India
- Interactive map of Kesavaraya Vishnu Dol

Architecture
- Type: Nilachal architecture
- Creator: Rudra Singha
- Completed: 1698; 328 years ago
- Temple: 3

The Keshavnarayan Vishnu dol, popularly known as Joy dol, is a temple built in 1698 by Ahom king Swargadeo Rudra Singha (1696–1714) in honour and memory of his mother Joymoti, and is dedicated to the Hindu god Vishnu. The presiding deity of the temple was known as Kesavaraya Visnu This temple is constructed of brick and stone. The walls are decorated with images of celestial beings and sculptures representing the social life of the day such as the sports and favourite pastimes of the erstwhile Ahom kings. The Joysagar Group of temples standing on the banks of the tank of the same name includes the Joydol, the Sivadol, the Devi Ghar (also known as the Devi dol), and the Ghanashyam House.

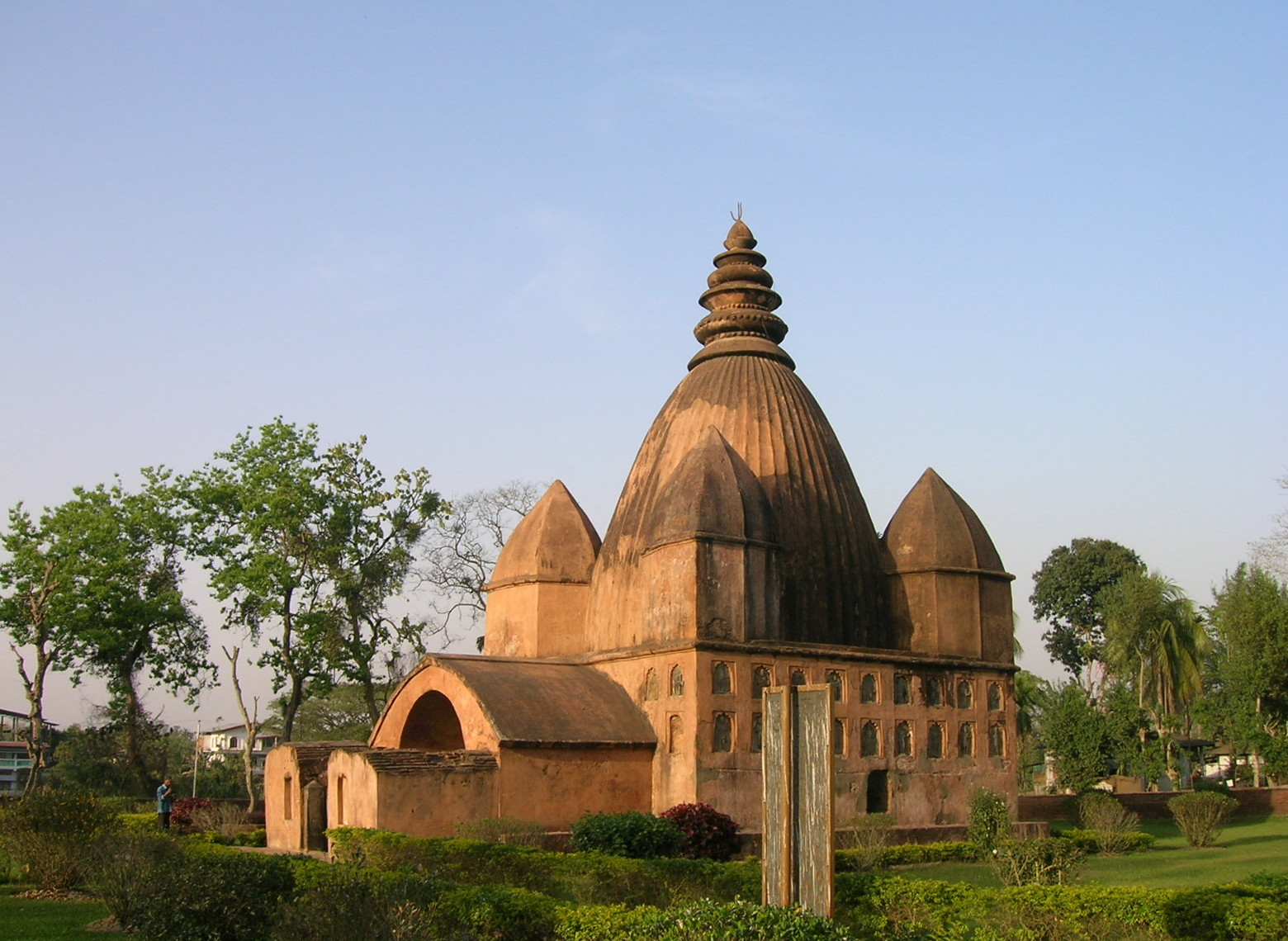
Shiva daul

== Joysagar ==
In the month of December, 1697 king Rudra Singha completed the excavation of the joysagar at the Rangpur capital after 45 days. The tank was consecrated after 3 months of its excavation in around March/April in 1698 by holding an assembly of the Mahajans, and named it Jaysagar. In the next year, Rudra Singha, built the temples on the bank of the tank dedicated to Vishnu, Shiva, Durga and Surya. It is also said in some chronicles that Rudra Singha constructed this sea-like tank to commemorate his mother's name Joymoti. The area of the tank with its bank in 318 acres, and the area under water is 155 acres.

== Siva dol ==
The Sivadol (also known as the Vaidya Natha) and the Devi dol, constructed by the same king Rudra Singha in the year 1699 CE, stand on the north and west banks of the tank respectively. The Siva temple was constructed on a square plinth. The main shrine height is 16.85m high. It has four large turrets around the main sikhara. There are niches in the wall containing stucco figurines representing various aspects of Siva. The surrounding of the temple is protected by a brick fort.

== Devi dol ==
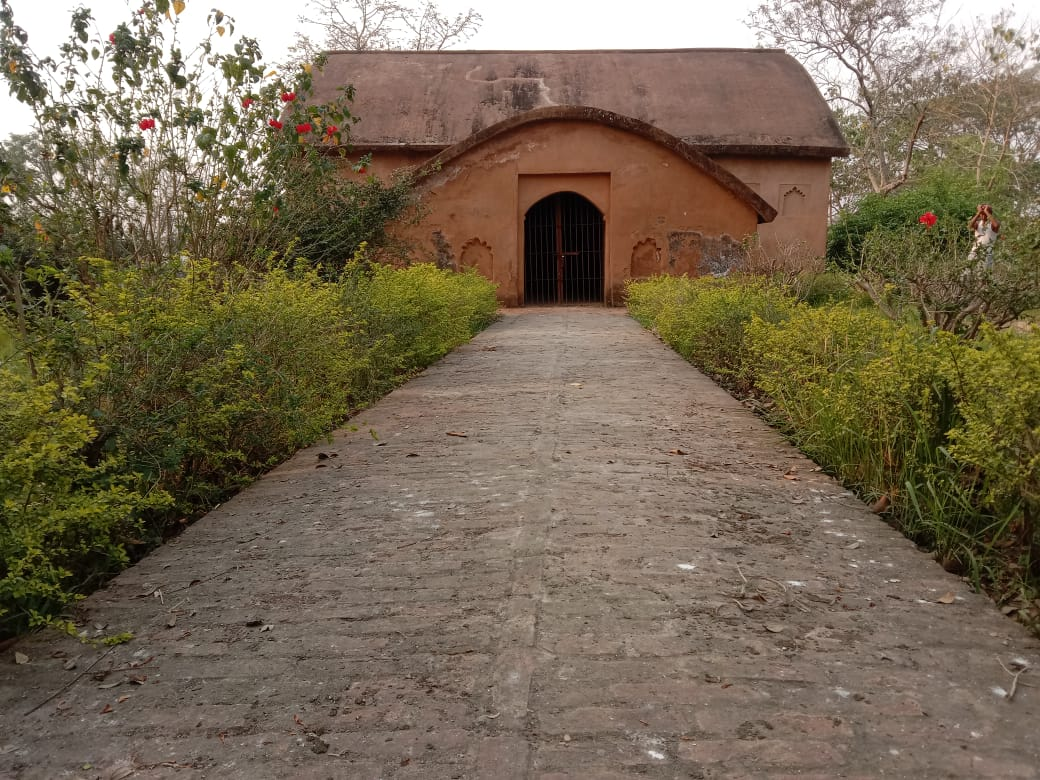
Devi Dol

The Devi dol at Joysagar is a simple brick built double-roofed hut built on a rectangular plinth. A similar type of mukhamandapa provides entrance to the temple. There are niches on the walls of the main temple containing different representations of her. Besides these temples, on the south-west bank of the tank there is a small brick-built temple commonly known as the Ghanashyam House or Nati-Gosain temple.
