= Ghanashyam House =

18th-century brick monument

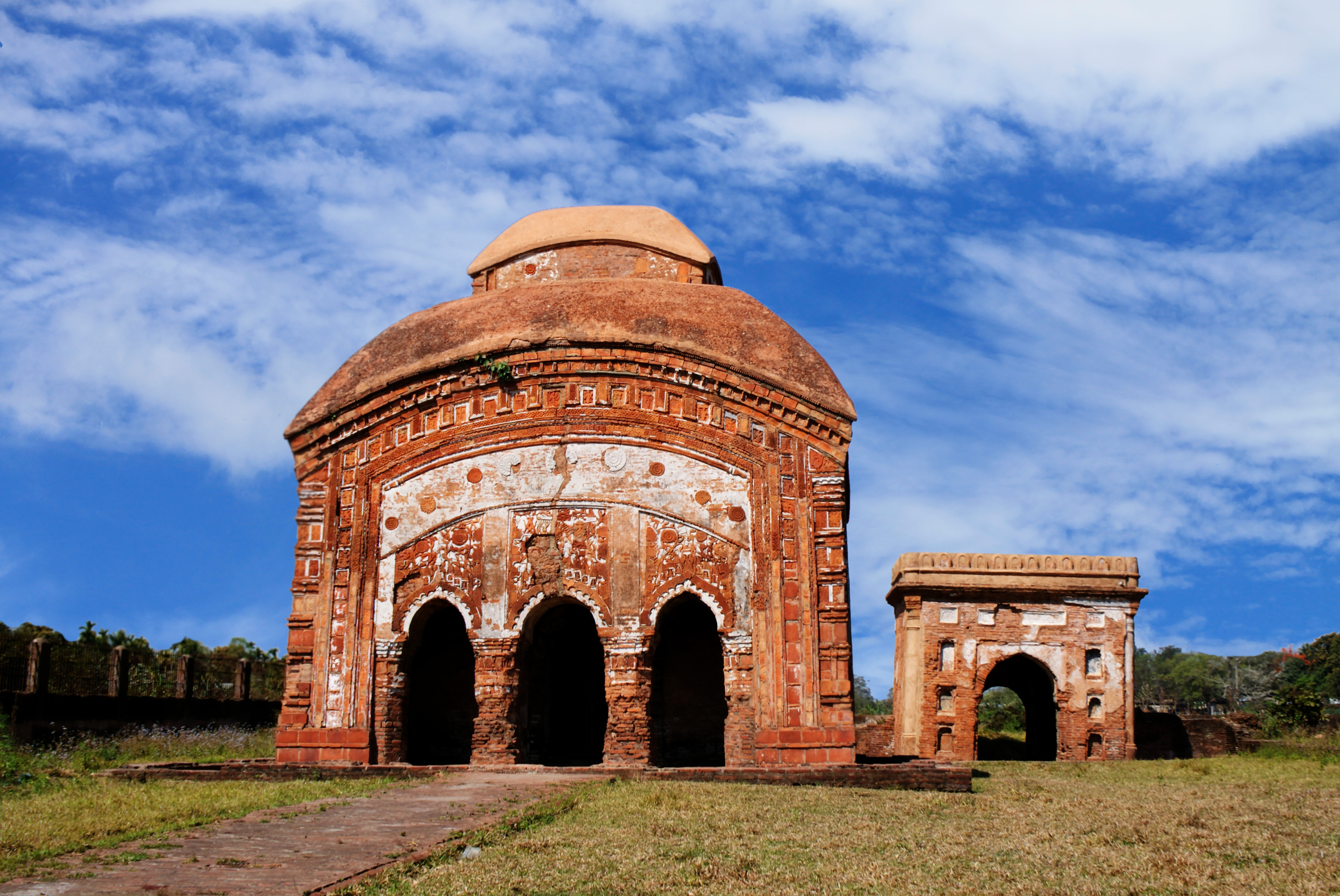
- Ghanashyam house
- Interactive map of the Ghanashyam House area

General information
- Architectural style: Hybrid
- Location: Sivasagar, Assam, India
- Coordinates: 26.9503°N 94.6182°E
- Construction started: early 18th-century

Technical details
- Structural system: Bricks and Indigenous type of cement

Design and construction
- Main contractor: Rudra Singha

Ghanashyam House or Nati Gosain dol is an early 18th-century brick monument built during the reign of the king Rudra Singha dedicated to the architect Ghanashyam. This monument is situated on the west bank of Joysagar Tank. It is 4 km away from Sivasagar town towards west.

== Architecture and history ==
It was constructed by one Ghanasyamuddin Khanikar later renamed as Ghanashyam, an architect from Bengal or Cooch Behar who was brought by king Rudra Singha, he entrusted him with the duty of designing the city of Rangpur.

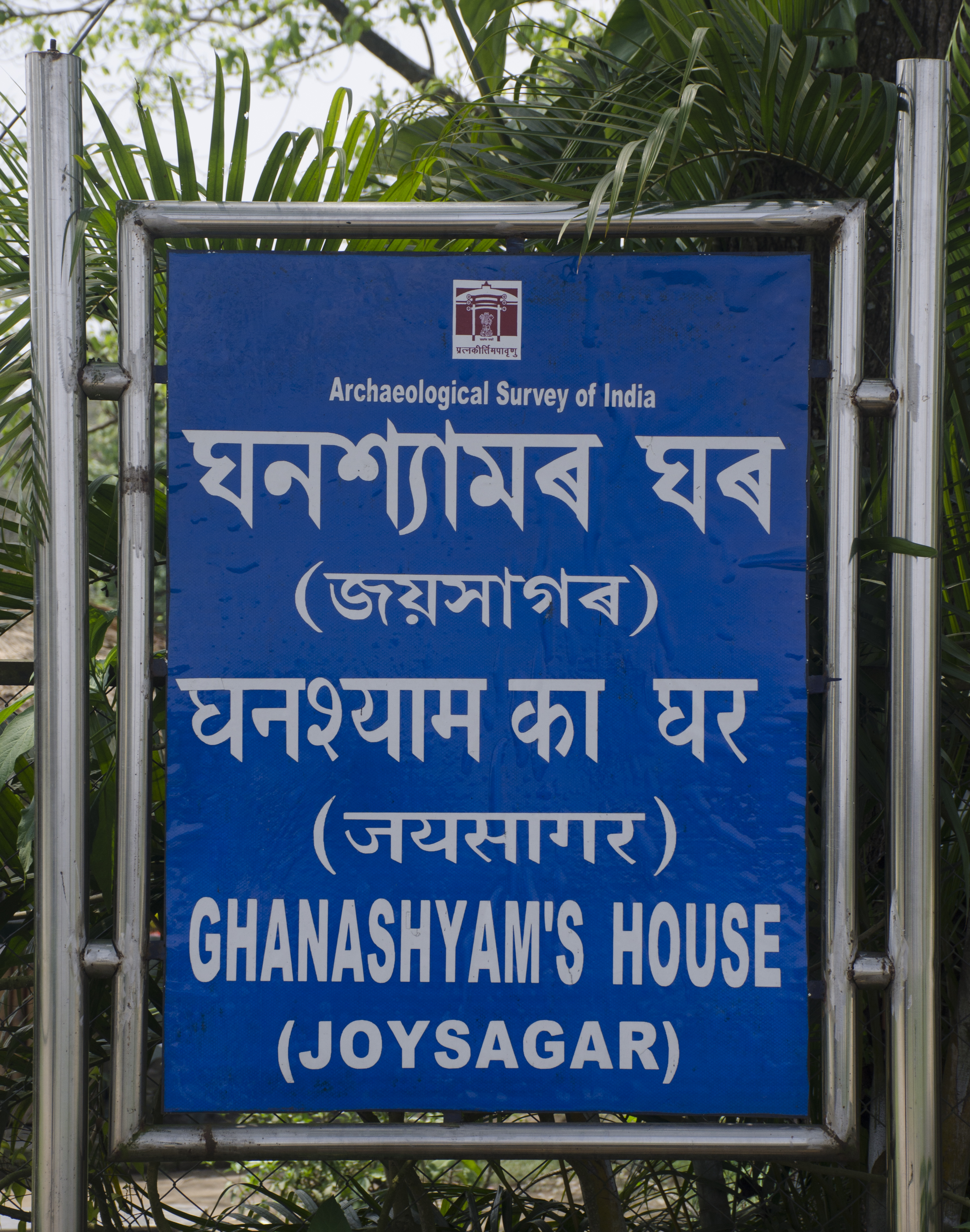
Information regarding Ghanashyam House

It is believed that Ghanashyam was earlier a Muslim who was converted to Hinduism. As a result of Ghanashyam's influence, this monument has mixture of Islamic architectural elements as well as Hindu architectural elements. The temple resembles a Bengal ekaratha structure but its cells contain a typical mihrab found in mosques. Islamic architectural influence can be heavily noticed in the architecture of this building.

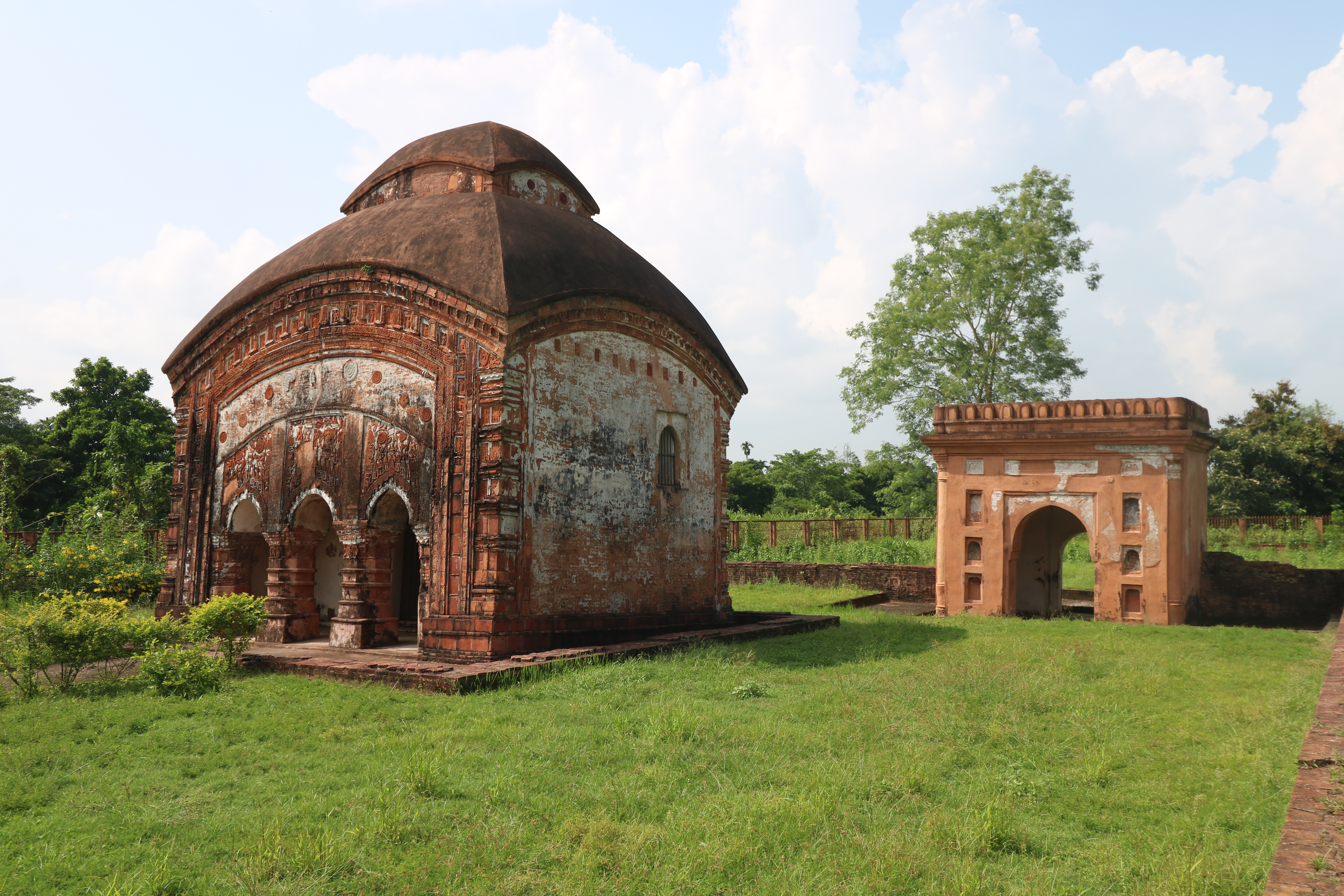
Sideview of Ghanashyam’s House

The temple is enriched with beautiful terracotta plaques depicting Lingas, scenes of Ramayana, avatars of gods, floral and geometrical designs. It also depicts mythical animals, hunting scenes, and demons. The temple has slightly bent due to previous earthquakes. The temples contain three arched gatehouses, with its flat roof crowned with a row of battlements is Islamic in outlook.

The temple for some reasons is also known as Nati-Gosain dol. It is also stated that according to some theories, this temple was built by Rajeswar Singha for the grandson of Parvatiya Gosain (Krishnaram Bhattacharya), who was the royal preceptor of Ahom Kings while some other place it to the reign of Pramatta Singha.
