= Molou Gohain, Tipam Raja =

Ahom Prince and claimant to the throne

Molou Gohain
- Tipam Raja
- Died: c.1775
- House: Tungkhungia
- Dynasty: Ahom
- Father: Pramatta Singha

Molou Gohain, Tipam Raja (died c. 1775) was an Ahom Prince and claimant to the Ahom throne. A member of the Ahom dynasty and its cadet branch the Tungkhungia line, he was the son of king Pramatta Singha.

== Ancestry ==
Molou Gohain was the son of king Pramatta Singha, of the Tungkhungia line of the Ahom dynasty. He had one brother, Madhab Gohain.

== Activities under Lakshmi Singha ==
In 1769, Molou Gohain was appointed Tipam Raja under his uncle, king Lakshmi Singha.

=== First rebellion and exile ===
In 1773, Gohain made an attempt to seize the throne from his uncle. An attendant, named Sahita, who worked in the quarters of Gohain, delivered a document to the Kalita Phukan which described a plot to kill the reigning monarch and seize the throne for himself. The Parbatiya Gosain, also called the Bhattacharya Gosain, allegedly performed the religious rites intended to help Molou seize the throne. After the conspiracy was detected, the King sent Vasudeva Kataki to reprimand the Gosain and threaten to dismiss him from his position.

Molou sent Brahmans to persuade senior officials to accept the initiation from the Parbatiya Gosain, including the Borpatrogohain, Borgohain anf other officials, some of whom were reportedly already sympathetic to the plot. Several others were implicated in the conspiracy, including the Parvatia Queen who allegedly exchanged letters and gifts with Gohain, and other attendants.

Molou was found guilty of plotting to seize the throne, and was banished to Tokolai and then Namrup.

=== Second rebellion and death ===
In 1775, several exiled princes lent their support to Molou for a rebellion against Lakshmi Singha, including Bijoy Barmura Gohain. However, the conspiracy failed following the death of Molou Gohain.
