= Ratneswar Gohain, Tipam Raja =

Ahom Prince

Ratneswar Gohain
- Tipam Raja
- Died: c.1769
- Issue: Bijoy Barmura Gohain; Thakur Gohain
- House: Tungkhungia
- Dynasty: Ahom
- Father: Rajeswar Singha
- Mother: Rupavati

Ratneswar "Saru" Gohain, Tipam Raja (died c. 1769) was an Ahom Prince and the third son of King Rajeswar Singha who was a claimant to the Ahom throne.

He was mutilated following the death of his father in 1769. Shortly afterwards, he joined the Mataks in the Moamoria rebellion against King Lakshmi Singha. After the Mataks had gained power, they poisoned Ratneswar to death.

== Ancestry and family ==
Ratneswar Gohain was the son of King Rajeswar Singha and the Parvatia Kunwari, Rupavati. His brothers were Kandura Gohain, Charu Singha, Charing Raja (Maju Gohain), and Pat Konwar. He was a member of the Tungkhungia line of the Ahom dynasty.

== Mutilation and exile ==
Following the death of Rajeswar Singha in May 1769, Lakshmi Singha, the brother of Rajeswar Singha and uncle of Ratneswar, acceded to the throne. This was despite his alleged illegitimacy due to his different physical features and different skin complexion. Attempts were made to place the elder brother of Ratneswar, Charu Singha, on the throne instead, but these were unsuccessful due to orchestration of the succession by Kirti Chandra Borbarua.

During the reign of Rajeswar Singha, Ratneswar conspired to kill the Borbarua, but was unable to do so as others prevented him. Borbarua resented Ratneswar for this, and after Lakshmi Singha became king, Borbarua prejudiced the new king against him. Borbarua helped drive them into exile at Namrup, and mutilated Ratneswar and his brothers. Lakshmi Singha gave way to the persistent pressure of Borbarua, but then repented and wished to withdraw it, to which the Borbarua replied that the order had already been delivered and was unable to be rescinded.

== Rebellion ==
The Moamorias (Mataks) had begun organising themselves to challenge the Ahom monarchy since July 1769. The Mataks eventually made alliances with all three of the exiled princes, Mohanmala Gohain, Charu Singha (Maju Gohain) as well as Ratneswar, and they assured each of the princes that if their rebellion was successful, they would place one of them on the throne. The rebels thought that this would create a division in the royalist camp since the exile of the princes, particularly Mohanmala, was unpopular.

During the fighting between the Moamorias and the royalists, Ratneswar along with his brothers and uncle rode on the backs of elephants in the vanguard of the Moamoria army. The royalist army was led by Harnath Senapati Phukan who was then captured and taken to the Moamoria camp.

== Murder and aftermath ==
After forming the government in Rangpur, the Mataks killed Ratneswar and his brother Charu Singha by poisoning them to death. Mohanmala Gohain was also later killed for alleged sympathies with his brother Lakshmi Singha.

== Issue and descendants ==
Ratneswar had two recorded sons:

- Bijoy Barmura Gohain – Barmura also sought the Ahom throne and was involved in numerous conspiracies. He was the father of Brajanath Gohain and grandfather of Purandar Singha.
- Thakur Bap Gohain – Thakur was involved in the conspiracy of Bhudar Singha, and attempted to seize the throne with the help of Lechengiyal Barpatra Gohain.

== Bibliography ==
- Bhuyan, S.K. (1949), Anglo-Assamese Relations, 1771-1826, Department of Historical and Antiquarian Studies in Assam
- Dutta, Sristidhar (1985), The Mataks and Their Kingdom Castes and Tribes of Assam (PDF), Chugh Publications
- Baruah, Swarna Lata (1993), Last Days of Ahom Monarchy A History of Assam from 1769-1826, Munshiram Manoharlal Publishers
- Hazarika, Bijay Bhushan (1987), Political Life in Assam During the Nineteenth Century, Gian Publishing House
- Kalitā, Rameśa Candra (1992), Assam in the Eighteenth Century, Omsons Publications
- Bhuyan, S.K. (1975). Swargadeo Rajeswar Singha স্বৰ্গদেৱ ৰাজেশ্বৰসিংহ [Swargadeo Rajeswar Singha] (in Assamese). Guwahati: Assam Publication Board.
