= Jaintipur =

Coordinates: 31.771°N 75.103°E

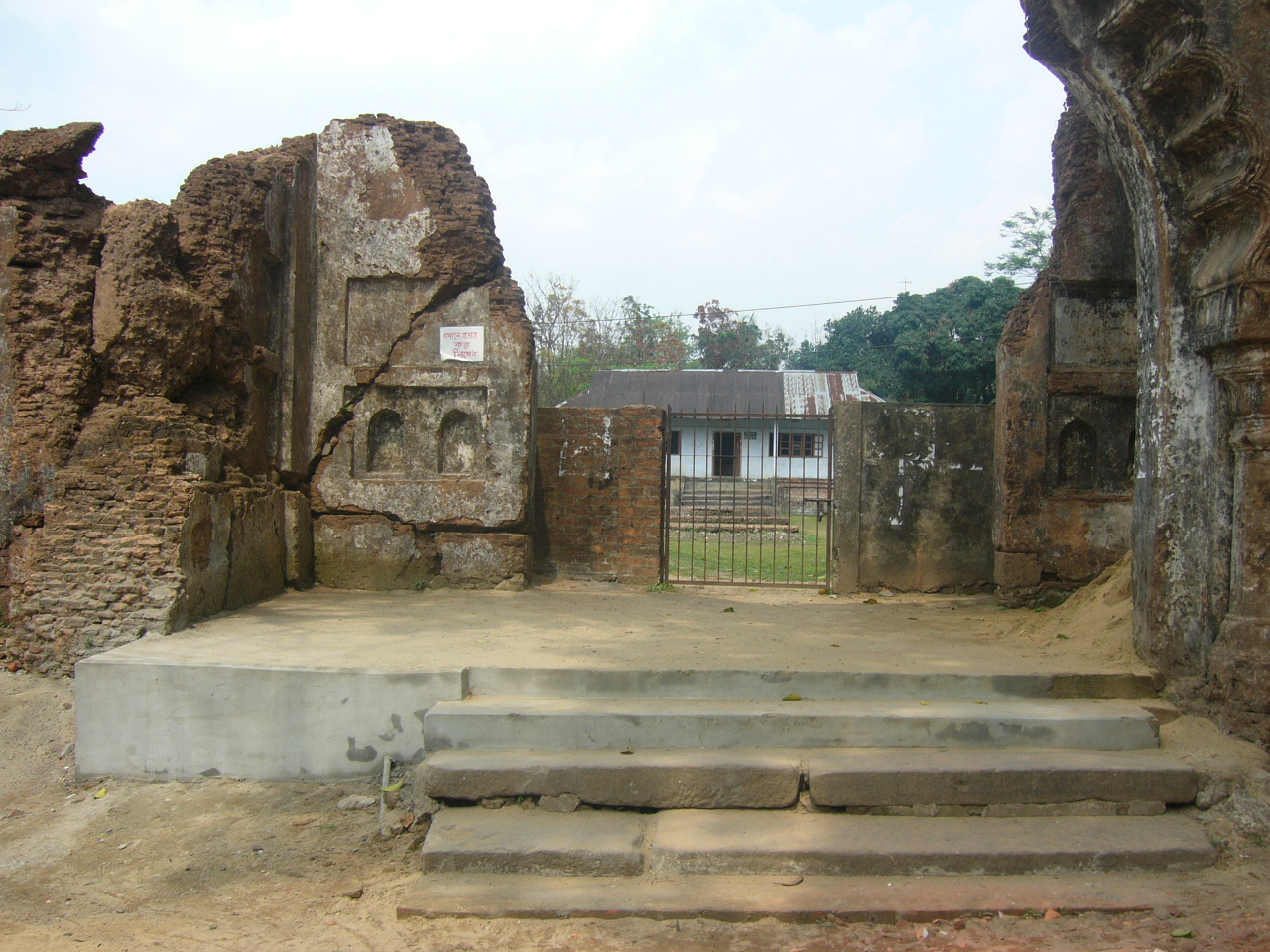
Jaintipur

Jaintipur is a village panchayat in the Amritsar district of the Indian state of Punjab. Locality Name : Jaintipur ( ਜੈਂਤੀਪੂਰ ) Tehsil Name : Majitha-3

District : Amritsar

State : Punjab

Language : Punjabi and Hindi, English & Urdu

Time zone: IST (UTC+5:30)

Elevation / Altitude: 237 meters. Above Sea level

Telephone Code / Std Code: 0183
