= Kirti Chandra Borbarua =

Assamese politician

Keertichandra Borbarua
- Preceded by: Rupchandra Barbarua
- Succeeded by: Bhadrasen Borborua

Personal details
- Born: Ahom Kingdom

Keertichandra Borbarua was the Prime Minister of Ahom Kingdom during the reign of Lakshmi Singha. He was a controversial person of Assam History. Though he was a capable statesman, burning the fake Buranjis was the controversial incident of his life.

== Personal life ==
Keertichandra Borbarua was the son of Rupchandra Barbarua. He was from the house of Bokotiyal. Gendhela was another name of Keertichandra Barbarua. He was assassinated by Moamoria rebel Nahar.

== Lota Kota Ron ==
During the reign of Swargadeo Rajeswar Singha an expedition was sent under the leadership of Haranath Phukan to free Manipur from the hand of Burmese. But the soldiers lost their path in the jungle. Naga also killed many soldiers. There was starvation among them. Fever also killed many warriors. At last Harnath Phukan decided to retreat from the jungle. Harnath Phukan informed all of these to Keertichandra Borbarua. Keertichandra told Swargadeo Rajeswar Singha about the matter. Rajeswar Singha decided to send another expedition under the leadership of Keertichandra Borbarua to Manipur.

== Role in the marriage of Kuranganayani ==
When Keertichandra Barbarua reached Roha the Burmese decided to retreat from Manipur. So the king of Manipur decided to give his daughter Kuranganayani to Rajeswar Singha as a sign of friendship. Keertichandra Borbarua told the king that the King of Manipur had a daughter whose name is Kuranganayani. The king of Manipur was the descendant of Babrubahan. So there was no doubt that he was Kshatriya for which Swargadeo should marry the princess Kuranganayani. After hearing these Swargadeo Rajeswar Singha decided to marry Kuranganayani. In this marriage the family of Joy Singha was present. The marriage took place at the bank of river Sonai (present-day Cachar district of Assam). It was a Chaklang form of marriage.

== Burning of the Buranjis ==
Keertichandra Borbarua was from the house of Bokotiyal. One of the ancestors of these house was engaged in the work of tailoring in the house of a Goriya for which the Bokotiyal was called the 'jolombota Goriya'. Disturbed by the influence of Keertichandra Borbarua in the royal court Numali Borgohain decided to write a Buranji humiliating Keertichandra for his low birth. After writing the Buranji Numali Borgohain named it "Chakaree Phetee'. Hearing these Keertichandra Borbarua brought his relative from Burma and proved that he was real Ahom. Keertichandra also decided to burn all the Buranjis where there were wrong. After taking permission of Rajeswar Singha Keertichandra burnt all the Buranjis where he found wrong. Keertichandra Borbarua also returned the Buranjis which he found true.

== Conflicts with the Moamoriya ==
Swargadeo Lakshmi Singha appointed Keertichandra Borbarua as his Prime Minister. Lakshmi Singha also appointed Ramananda Pushpacharya of Kanauj as his religious teacher. This made the other Mahantas angry. Lakshmi Singha appointed Ramananda Puspacharya by counselling with Keertichandra Borbarua for which the Moamoriya Mahanta scolded Keertichandra by telling him Jolombota. This made the Moamoriya enemy of Keertichandra. One day Lakshmi Singha was coming with Keertichandra Borbarua in a boat. The Moamoriya Mahanta greeted Swargadeo but did not even look at Keertichandra. For this reason Keertichandra also scolded Moamoriya. In those days there was a rule that Moamoriya should give three elephants. One to Swargadeo, One to Burhagohain and one to Borbarua. In the year of 1691 shaka a Naharkhora of the Moamoriya gave one strong elephant to Swargadeo and one strong elephant to Burhagohain but gave a weak elephant to Keertichandra Borbarua. This made Borbarua very angry . He cut two ears of Naharkhora as punishment. Naharkhora told about all of these before the Moamoriya Mahanta.

== Assassination ==
The Moamoriya was already upset from the days of Siva singha because Bor Roja Phuleshwari marked their head with the blood of sacrifice made before goddess Durga. The incident of Naharkhora increased their anger. They prepared for rebellion. The Moamoriya made the Mohanmala Gohain the son of Rudra Singha their commander. At last the rebellion started. At the beginning of the rebellion the Nahar of Moamoriya killed Keertichandra. Thus Keertichandra Borbarua was assassinated.
