= Rajeswar Singha =

Ahom king from 1751 to 1769

Surempha
- Chaopha Swargadeo of Ahom Kingdom
- Posthumous portrait, 1836

Ahom King
- Reign: October 1751 – 30 May 1769
- Predecessor: Pramatta Singha
- Successor: Lakshmi Singha
- Born: Ramanath Gohain c.1704 Ahom kingdom
- Died: 30 May 1769 (aged 65); Dergaon, Ahom kingdom
- Consort: Kuranganayani (Bor Konwari)
- Wives: See list: Rupavati; Kamalabariya Ai Kuwari Deo; Kalugayan Ai Kuwari Deo; Deogayan Ai Kuwari Deo; Bar Tamuli Ai Kuwari Deo; Na Jana Ai Kuwari Deo
- Issue: Kandura Gohain; Charu Singha; Ratneswar; Pat Konwar
Names
- Sri Sri Maheswari padaparayana Sri Rajeswar Singha nripasya, Kavi Churamani (Supreme poet)
- House: Tungkhungia
- Dynasty: Ahom
- Father: Rudra Singha
- Religion: Hinduism

Rajeswar Singha (born Ramanath Gohain; c. 1704 – 30 May 1769), also known as Surempha, was Ahom King from 1751 until his death in 1769.

== Ancestry ==
Ramanath Gohain was born c. 1704 as the fourth son of King Rudra Singha. He was a member of the Tungkhungia branch of the Ahom dynasty.

== Accession to the throne ==
Ramanath Gohain became the King of the Ahom kingdom after the death of his brother King Pramatta Singha in 1751, and took the Tai regnal name Surempha and Hindu name Rajeswar Singha. Rudra Singha's third son, Mohanmala Gohain, was considered ineligible for kingship as his face was pitted with smallpox marks. According to the norm established after Sulikpha Lora Roja, an Ahom prince had to be free from any physical disability, defects or deformities to become a king. Additionally, Mohanmala was the son of Chamuya Kunwari, while the custom was that the son of the Bor Kunwari or Parvatia Kunwari was eligible.

== Reign ==
The king, though a capable administrator, preferred pleasures to the affairs of the state.

=== Activities of the Borbarua ===
The administration was looked after by Bakatial Gendhela Borbarua, renamed Kirti Chandra Borbarua after the Manipur expedition (see below). Kirti Chandra was an overbearing person, disliked by the other nobles; there were attempts to assassinate him. He learned that the Chakaripheti Buranji in Numali Borgohain's possession attributed a low and non-Ahom origin to him. To extinguish a future challenge to his position, he had all the Buranjis collected under the Swargadeo's orders and scrutinized for this reference. Many Buranji's were destroyed during this exercise.

=== Expedition to Manipur ===
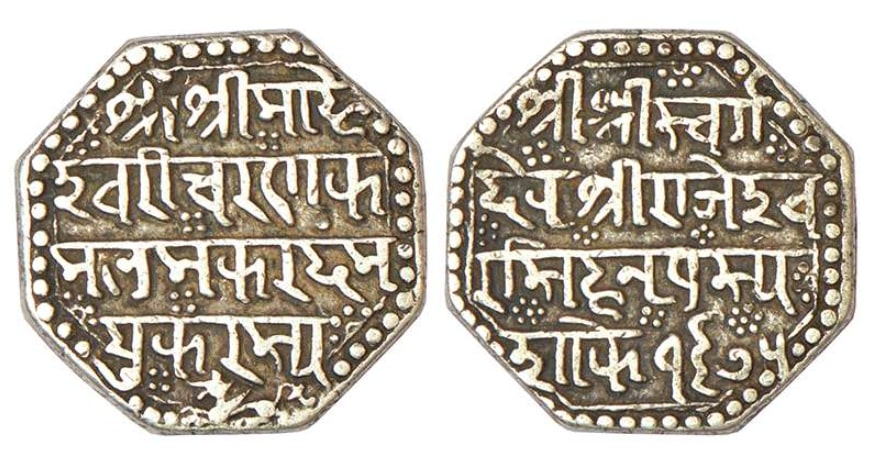
Rajmohuree of Rajeswar Singha in Nagari script.

Later, Jai Singh of Manipur made a personal appeal to Rajeswar Singha in his court to help him drive out the Burmese from his kingdom. Rajeswar Singha consulted his ministers and sent an army consisting of mul and dewal paiks in 1765 commanded by Duara Haranath Bitarual Phukan as the Senapati Phukan (Commander) to Manipur directly over the hills south of Charaideo to reinstate Jai Singh. But the jungle was extremely dense so the work of clearing a road was laborious and time-consuming. The troops suffered great hardship, lack of food and many died from raiding Naga tribesmen and snake bites. The king ordered the return of the army. This unsuccessful expedition came to be known as the Lotakota ron (War of the Creepers).

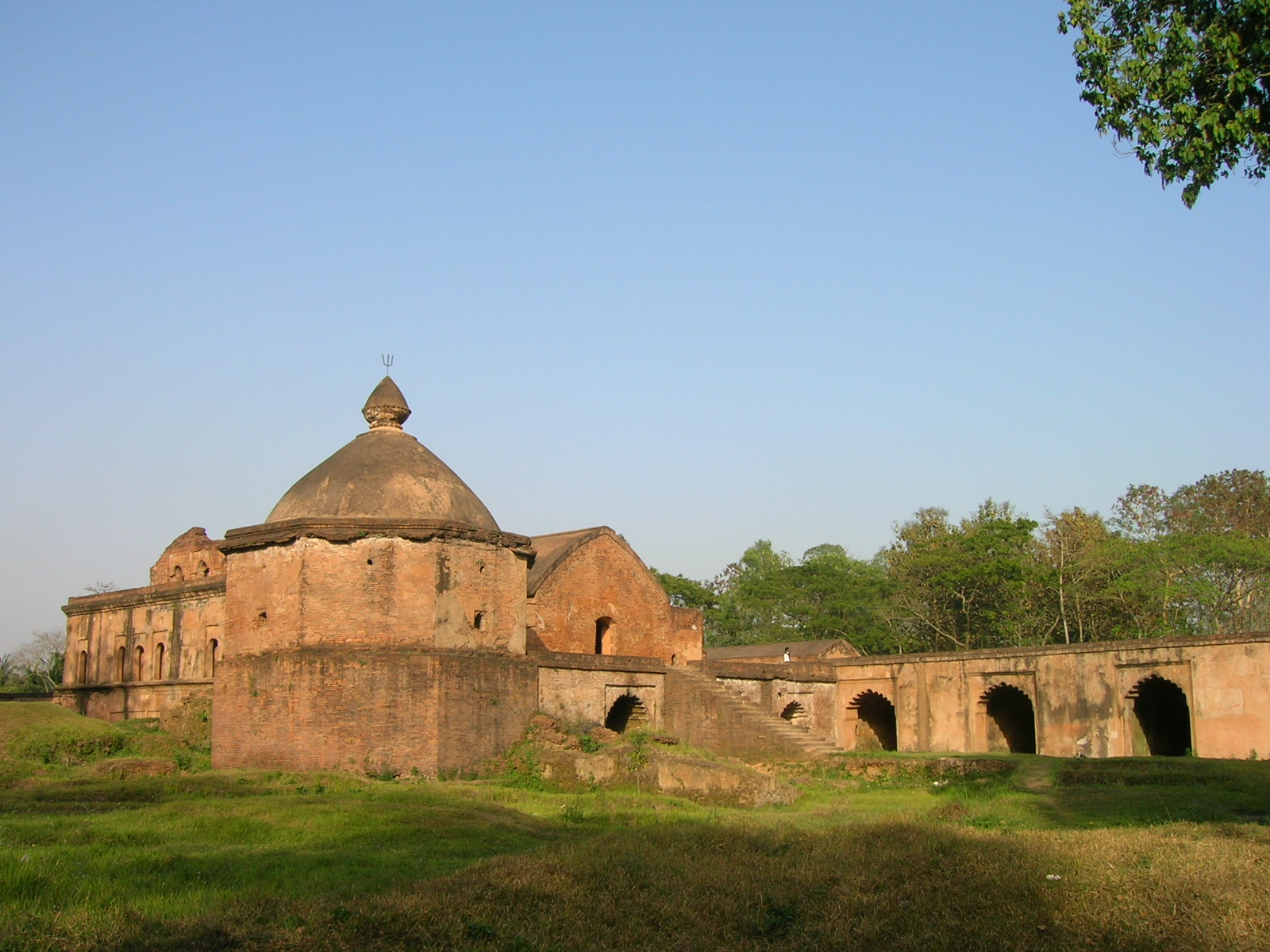
Talatal Ghar made by Rajeswar Singha

=== Administrative works ===
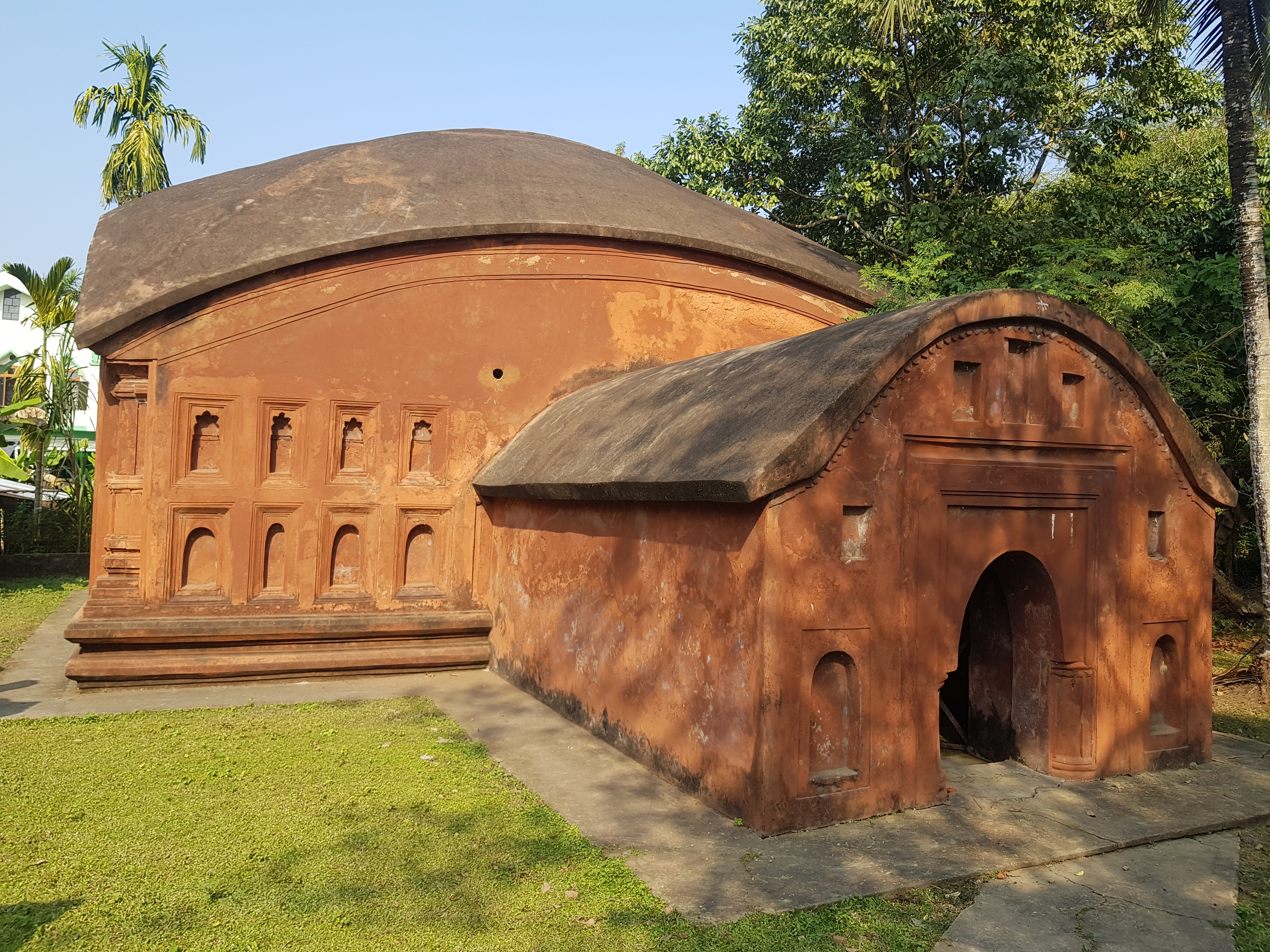
Hara-Gauri Devalaya built by Rajeswar Singha.

Like his father Rudra Singha, Rajeswar Singha constructed many temples and renovated the palaces. Notable among his contribution is the present existing structure of the seven-storied palace of Garhgaon which was built around 1752. Rajeswar Singha added three underground stories known as Talatal Ghar made of brick and an indigenous type of cement to the four-storied Kareng Ghar (or palace) at Rangpur. The Talatal ghar had two secret tunnels connected to the Dikhow river and the Kareng Ghar for use as an escape route in case of any enemy attack. The Borbheti Than which about 7 km from Jorhat town was built during his reign. His most notable contribution among temples of Assam is the building of the unique Navagraha temple in Guwahati.

Other works of King Rajeswar Singha are: Basistha Temple, Manikarneswar Devalaya, Chitrachal Mandir, Naba Graha Mandir, Negheriting Shiva Doul, Hara Gauri Dol, Sukreswar Temple, Kamakhya Nat Mandir, Dirgheshwari temple, Shri Kedar Temple, Moglau Pukhuri, Sil Pukhuri, Nati Gosanir dol, Bahikhowa Bar Phukanar Ali, Luthuri Kath, Katiya Barua Ali, Deka Barbarua Ali.

== Family and issue ==
Rajeswar Singha had 24 queens. The Bor Kunwari, the highest-rank queen, was Manipuri Princess Kuranganayani. His Parvatia Queen was Rupavati. His other queens included Kamalabariya Ai Kuwari Deo, the Kalugayan Ai Kuwari Deo, the Deogayan Ai Kuwari Deo, the Bar Tamuli Ai Kuwari Deo and the Na Jana Ai Kuwari Deo.

Rajeswar Singha had four sons. His first three sons were born while he was still a prince, while his youngest son was born after his accession to the throne:

- Kandura Gohain – died at Garhgaon shortly after his father became King, and was buried in a Moidam built at Bhogbari, near Rangpur.
- Charu Singha, Charing Raja – son of Rupavati.
- Ratneswar Gohain, Tipam Raja – son of Rupavati.
- Pat Konwar

Ahom chronicles mention one daughter of Rajeswar Singha. After Ragh Borbarua took power, he seized Kuranganayani and a daughter of Rajeswar Singha and placed them into a compound consisting of his hundred wives. When Ragh became Borbarua, Singha's daughter contracted smallpox and died in the Pali Ghar at Rangpur. By Ragh's order, her moidam was created where her elder brother Kandura Gohain was buried. Rajeswar Singha may have had other daughters, but they are not mentioned in the chronicles.

== Death and succession ==
Rajeswar Singha died on 30 May 1769, aged around 65, at Dergaon, and was succeeded by his brother Lakshmi Singha.

== See also ==
- Ahom Dynasty
- Ahom kingdom
