= Tungkhungia Ahom kings =

Sub-branch of the Ahom dynasty

The Tungkhungia were a sub-branch of the Ahom dynasty. These kings ruled the Ahom kingdom from 1681 till the end in the beginning of the 19th century.

== Genealogy ==
The genealogy of the Tungkhungia Ahom kings, adapted from Baruah 1993.

Tungkhungia Ahom kings

Suhungmung (1497–1539)
Suteng (Tungkhungiya)
Saranga
Gobar (1675–1675)
Gadadhar Singha (1681–1696)	Jambor Gohain Charing Raja
Rudra Singha (1696–1714)	Lechai	Sriram
Siva Singha (1714–1744)	Pramatta Singha (1744–1751)	Rajeswar Singha (1751–1769)	Lakshmi Singha (1769–1780)	Ayusut	Langal
Ratneswar Gohain, Tipam Raja	Gaurinath Singha (1780–1795)	Kadamdighala	Pirika
Bijoy Barmura Gohain	Kamaleswar Singha (1795–1811)	Chandrakanta Singha (1811–1818) (1819–1821)	Baga Konwar Tipam Raja
Brajanath Gohain, Charing Raja	Jogeswar Singha (1821–1822)
Purandar Singha (1818–1819) (1833–1838)
