= Rangpur, Assam =

Rangpur Tsé-Moon
- City
- Rang Ghar in Rangpur

- Location in Assam, India Rangpur (India)
- Coordinates: 26.967°N 94.619°E
- Country: India
- State: Assam
- District: Sivasagar

Government
  - Type: BJP
  - Body: Rangpur Municipal Corporation

Area
  - Total: 1,599 km^{2} (617 sq mi)
- Elevation: 95 m (312 ft)

Population (2025)
  - Total: 1,151,050
  - Density: 719.9/km^{2} (1,864/sq mi)

Languages
  - Official: Assamese
- Time zone: UTC+5:30 (IST)
- ISO 3166 code: IN-AS
- Vehicle registration: AS

Rangpur (Tai-Ahom:Tsé-Moon/ˈræŋpʊər, ˈrɒŋ-/; Assamese: [ɹɔŋ.puɹ]) is a City the 4th capital of the Ahom kingdom, was established by Swargadeo Rudra Singha in "Meteka" in 1707 after shifting the capital from Garhgaon.

The place holds many monuments build by the Ahom dynasty, the most notable of which are the Talatal Ghar and the Rang Ghar.

The architectural plan of Rangpur spread over almost a thousand bighas of land. Ghanasyam, an architect from Koch Bihar, was deputed by Rudra Singha to design the city.

== Etymology ==
Rangpur situated near the modern day Sivasagar District, means City of delight or the City of Joy as the King here had immensely enjoyed the falconry arranged by the Borphukan and in Ahom language it is called Che-mun.

== History ==
=== Capital City ===
The city of Rangpur was laid in C.E. 1698 by King Rudra Singha at Tengabari of Meteka area. He then excavated the famous Joysagar Tank and there after he respectively had constructed the Talatal Ghar, Rangnath Dol, Fakuwa dol, Gola Ghar, and the Joy dol. The city had three gates, namely– Borduar (i.e. main entrance), Na-duar and Paniduar besides an underground tunnel connected with the Dikhow river on the north.

The city was bounded by Dikhow on the north, a fort (Garh) near Namdang river on the south, Bangarh on the east and Dikhow-Namdang on the west. Ananta Acharyya, who received the royal patronage of King Siva Singha and Phuleshwari, gives a beautiful description of Rangpur in his manuscript Ananda Lahari –

Rangpur was second Amaravati (first being the Amaravati of Indra) surrounded by the Visistha Jahnavi (i.e. Dikhow) in the north, the river Namdang in the west and the river Dimbawati (i.e. Dimow) in the south. The city was protected by four mud forts surmounted by wooden fortifications, inside of which there were brick and stone ramparts, masonry buildings, stores of gold, silver, copper, bell-metal, scent, precious ornaments, arms and ammunition and tanks full of lotus. Besides these, Rangpur was covered by the lines of trees like mango, jackfruit, paniyal, jamu, arecanut, orange and coconut.

— Ananta Acharyya, Ananda Lahari

Successors of Rudra Singha did much for the enhancement of splendour and expansion of the city of Rangpur. Pramatta Singha re-constructed the Rang Ghar with bricks in C.E. 1746, Rajeswar Singha re-constructed the (present-day) Talatal Ghar with bricks, the Hara-Gauri Dol (West of Rangnath) and Nati-Gosain Dol. Lakshmi Singha made a flower garden in which he built the temple of Ekaneswar (Shiva) with a tank.

==== Roads and Communications ====
The main road of the capital was Bor Ali, starting from Dergaon to Joysagar. Some other significant roads of around Rangpur were Meteka Ali, Duboroni Ali, Borpatra Ali etc.

The royal families and the officials used to reside in the– Jerenga pothar, Rupohi pothar etc.

=== Decline ===
Rangpur was the capital of Ahoms during the most glorious period of the Ahom kingdom. During the Moamoria rebellion (1769–1805), it became vulnerable to the rebels and came under their occupation on many occasions; the rebellion left the city ruined. Kamaleswar Singha made some efforts to revive its former glory but Burmese invasions left it a ruined .

== Photo gallery ==
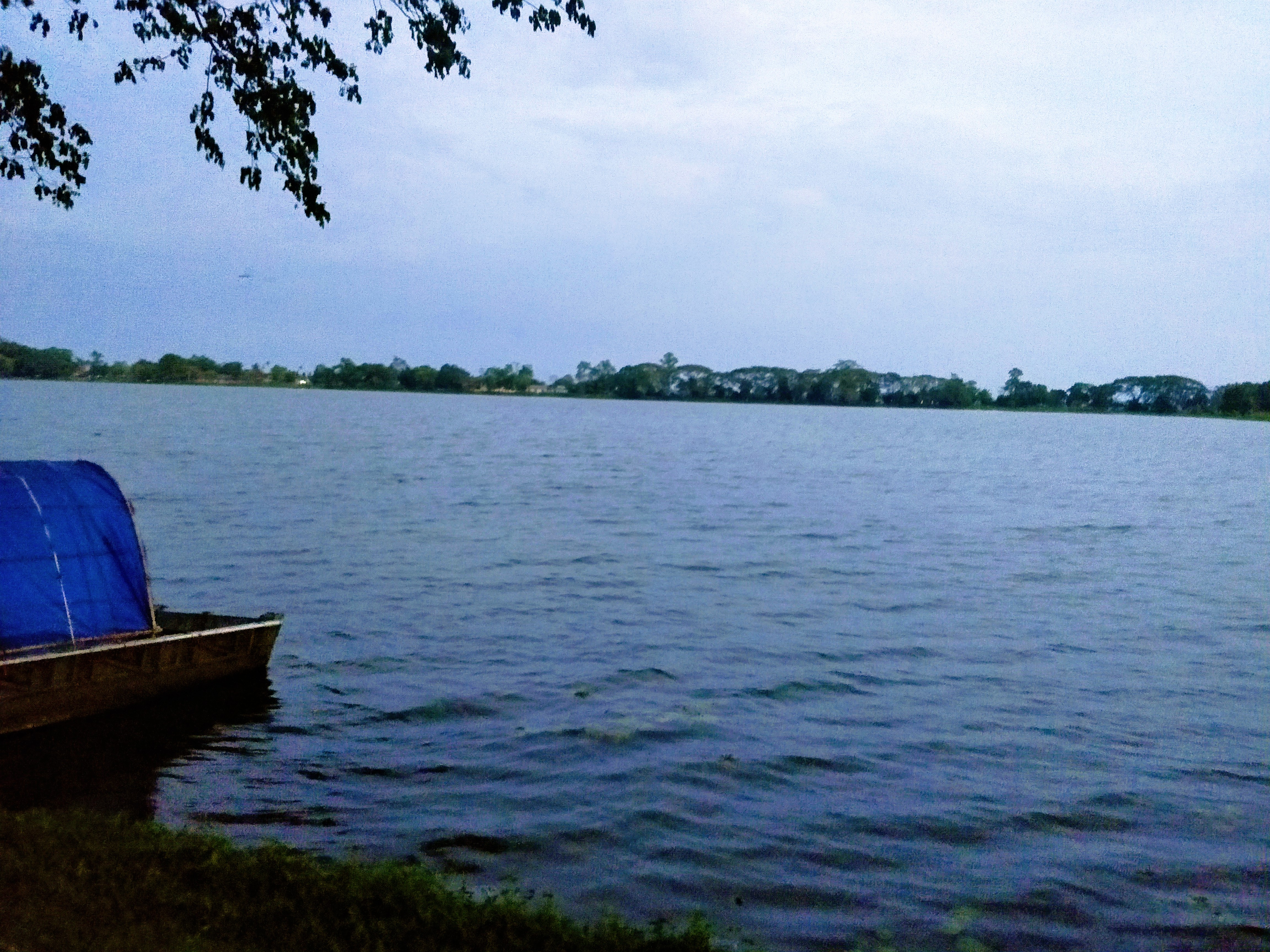
Joysagar Tank biggest artificial tank of India.

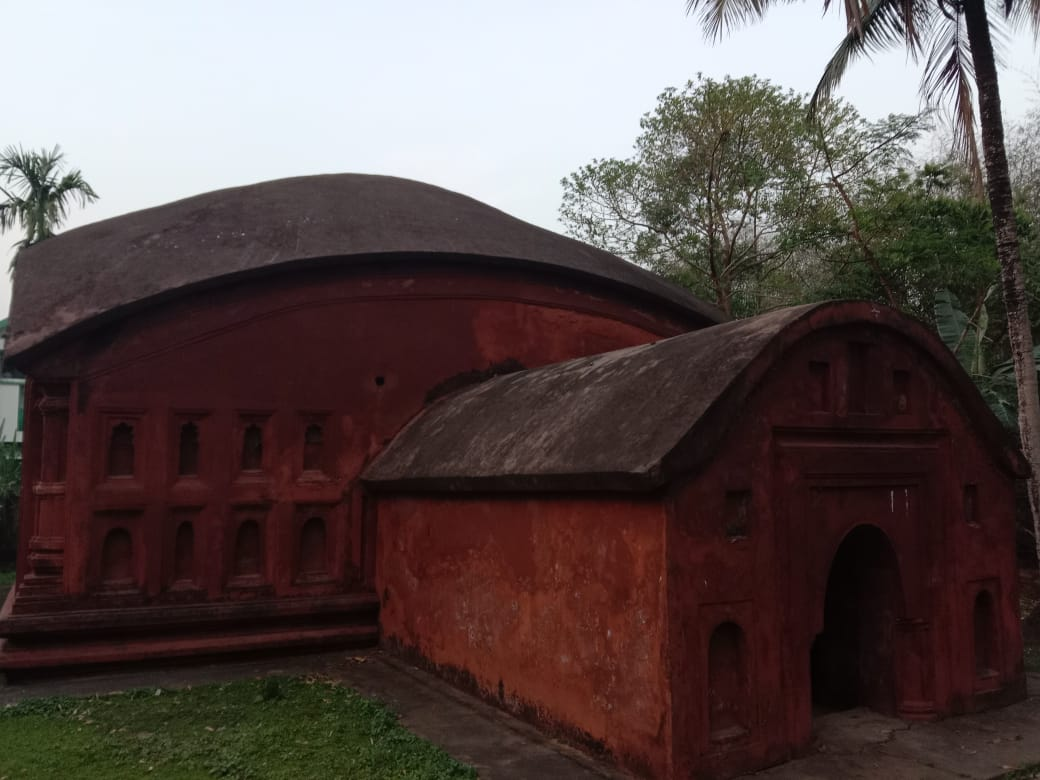
Hara Gauri dol

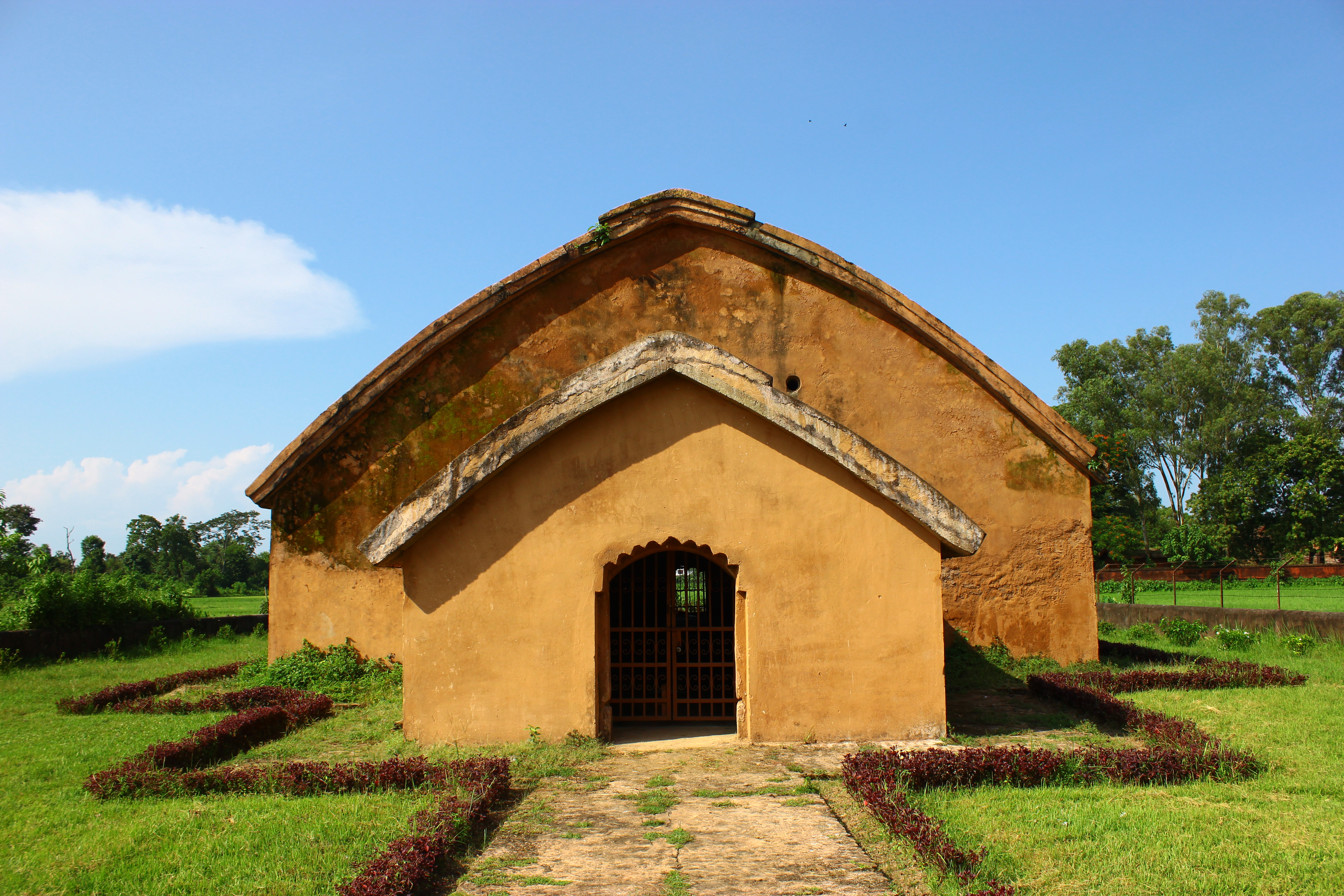
Gola Ghar

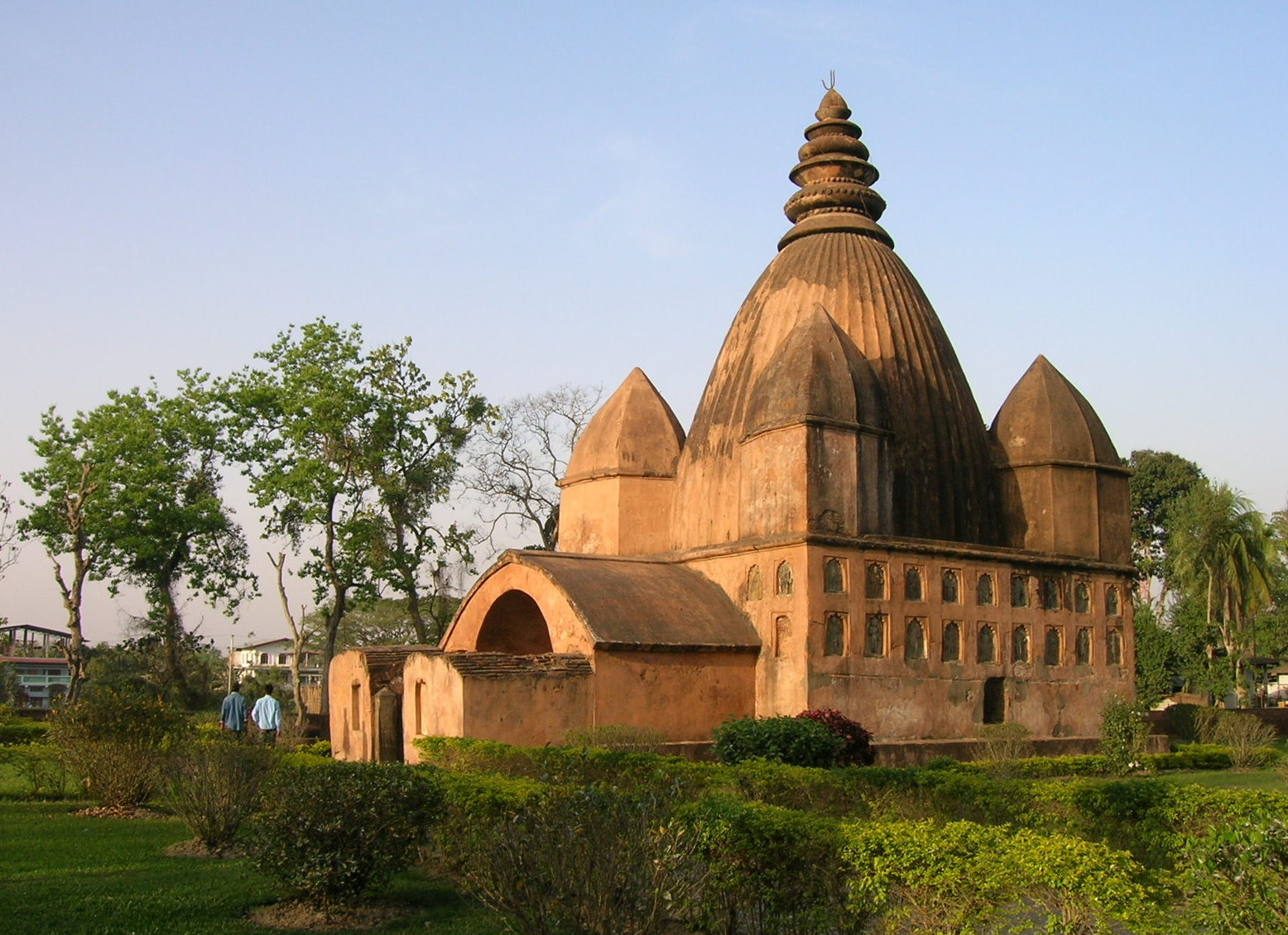
Shiva dol, Joysagar

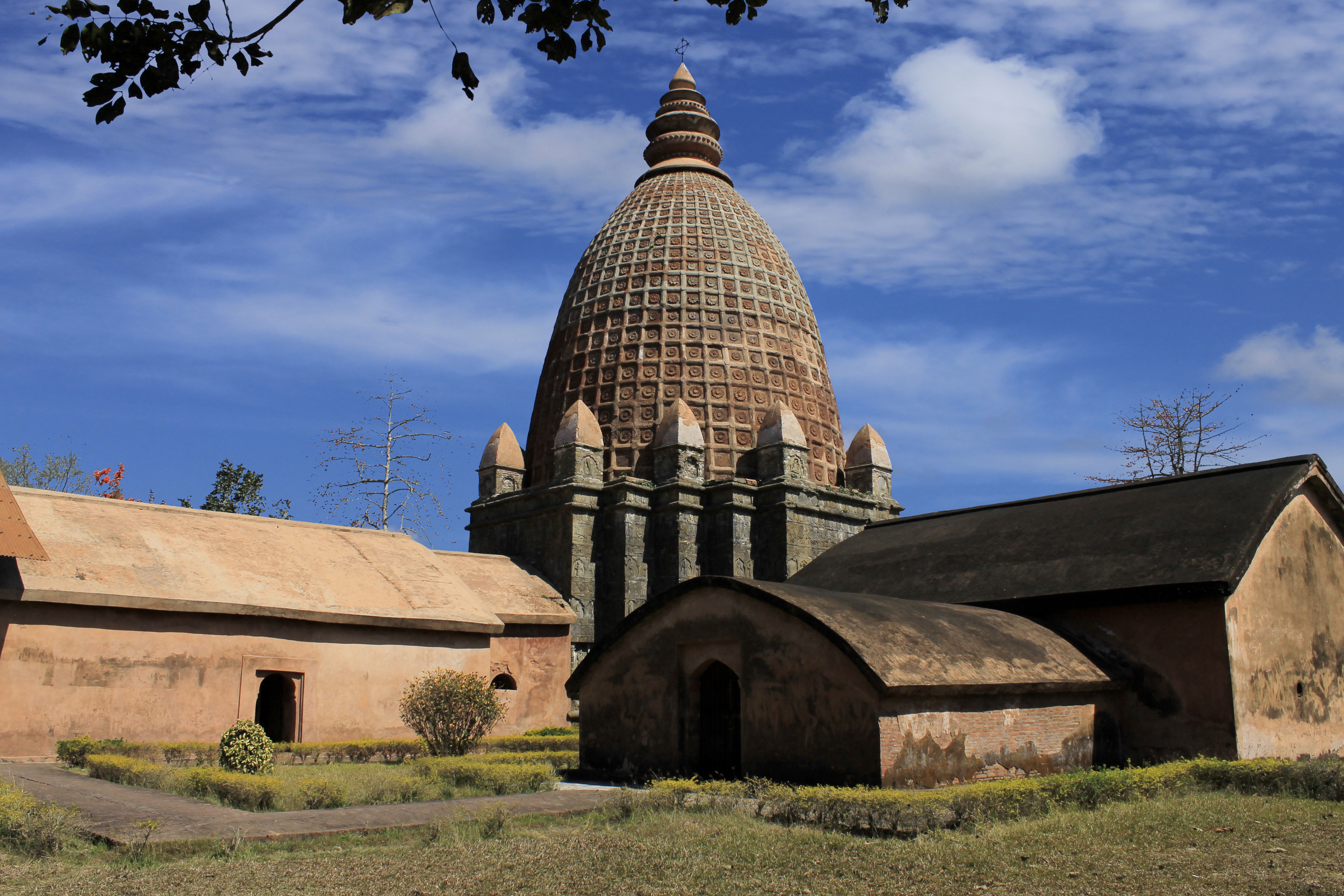
Joy dol

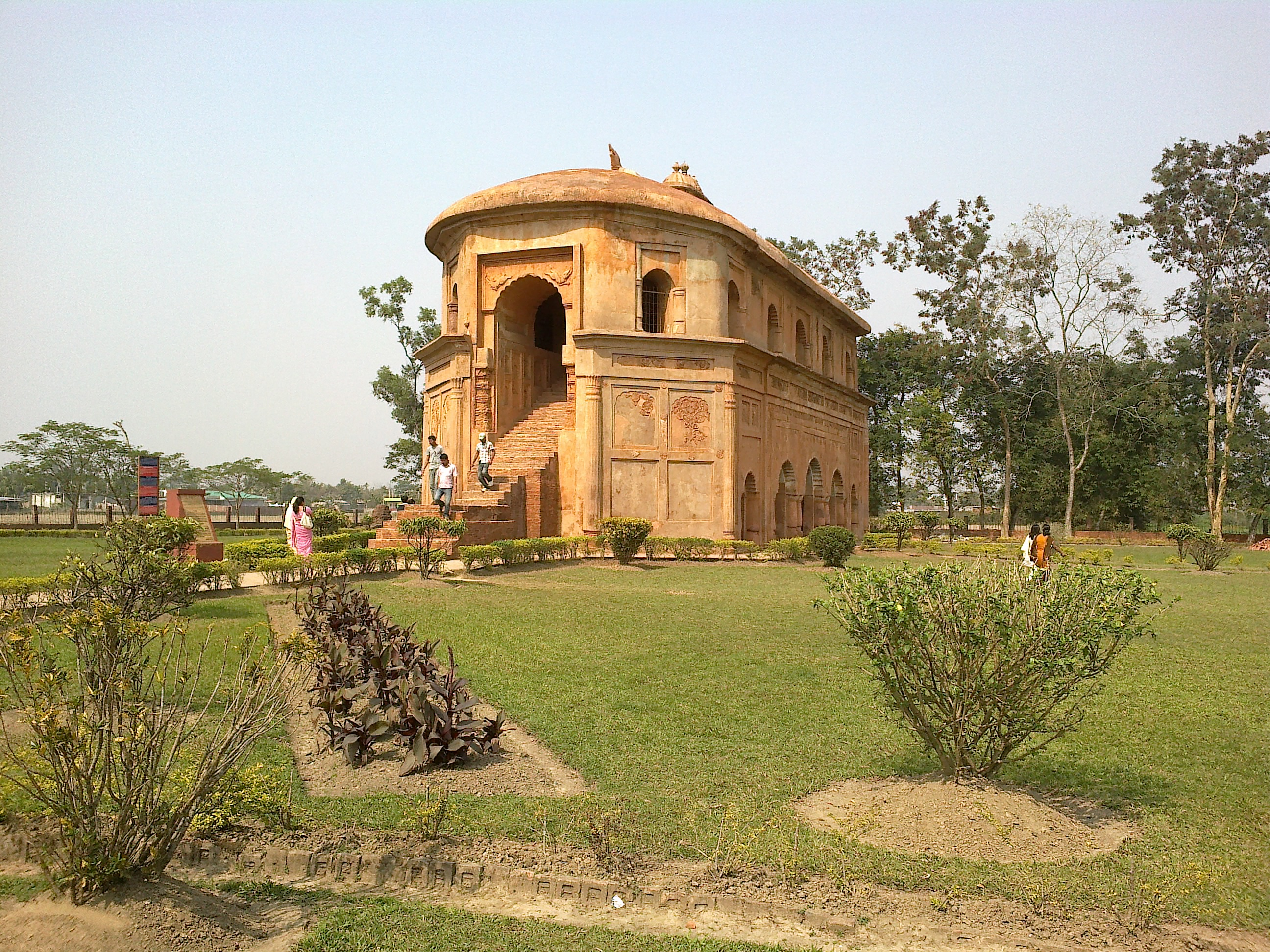
Rang Ghar

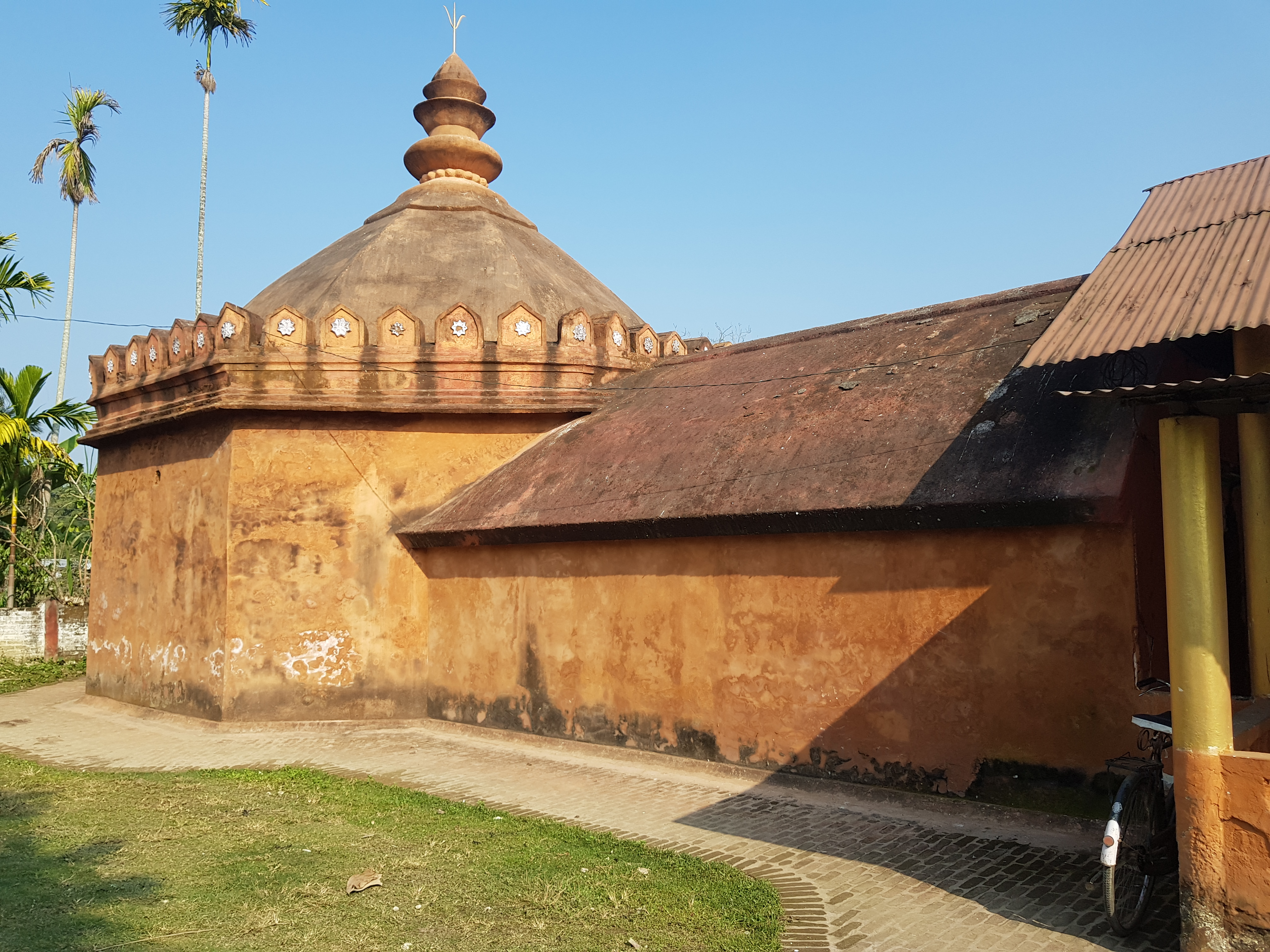
Rangnath Dol

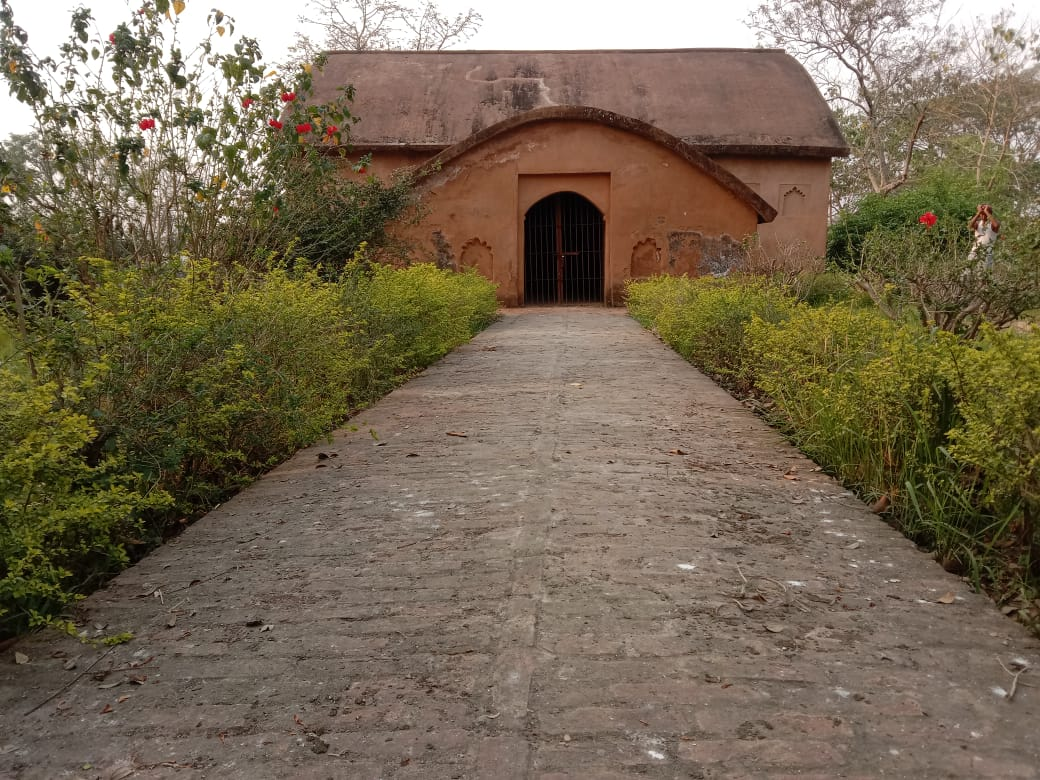
Devi ghar

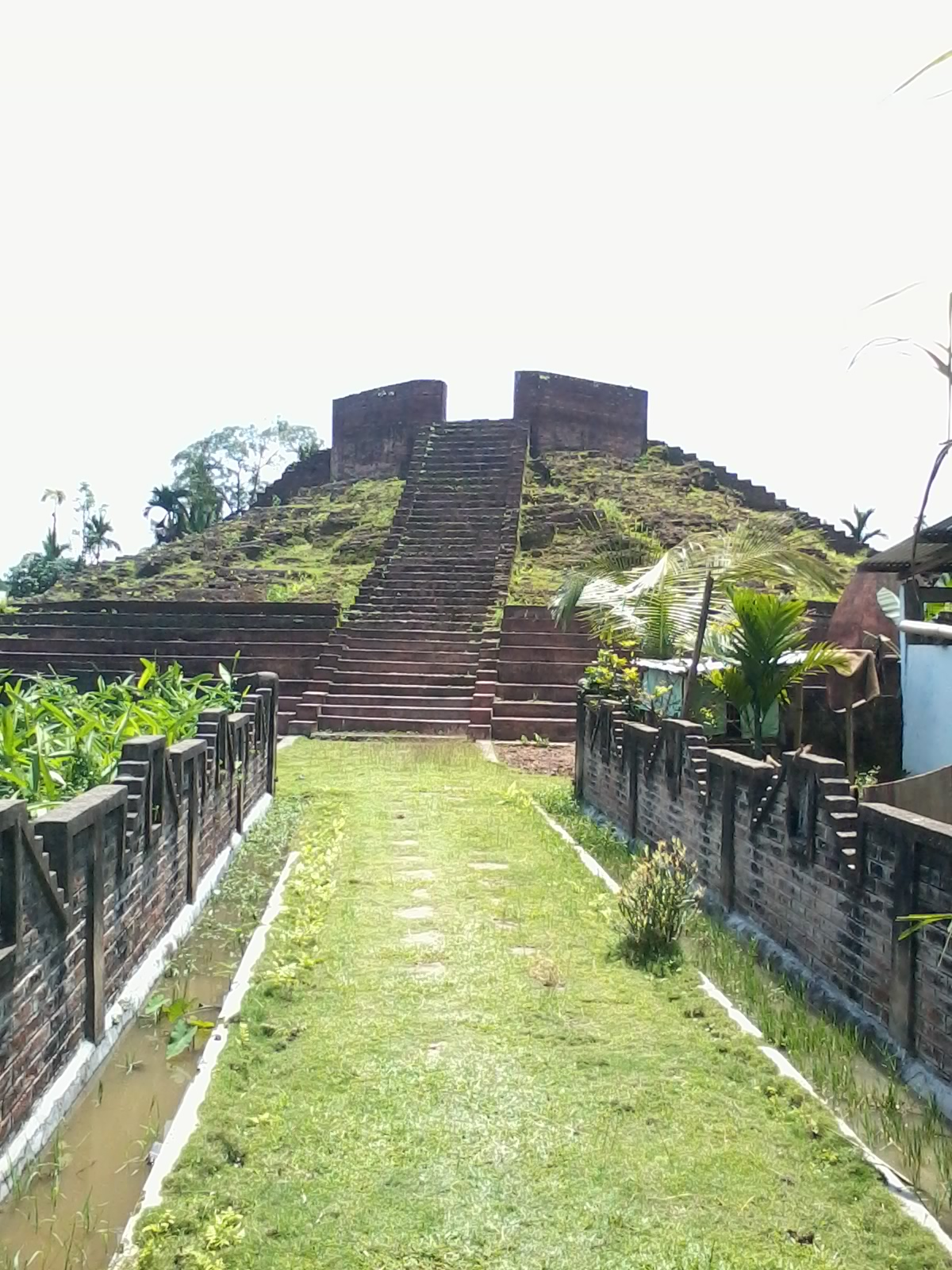
Fakuwa dol

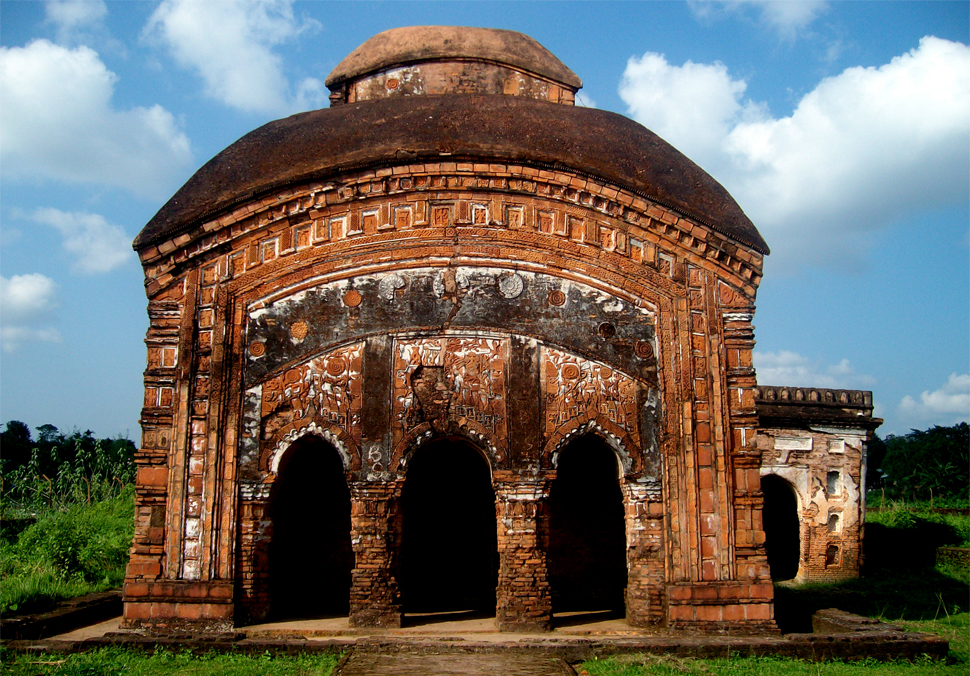
Ghanashyam House

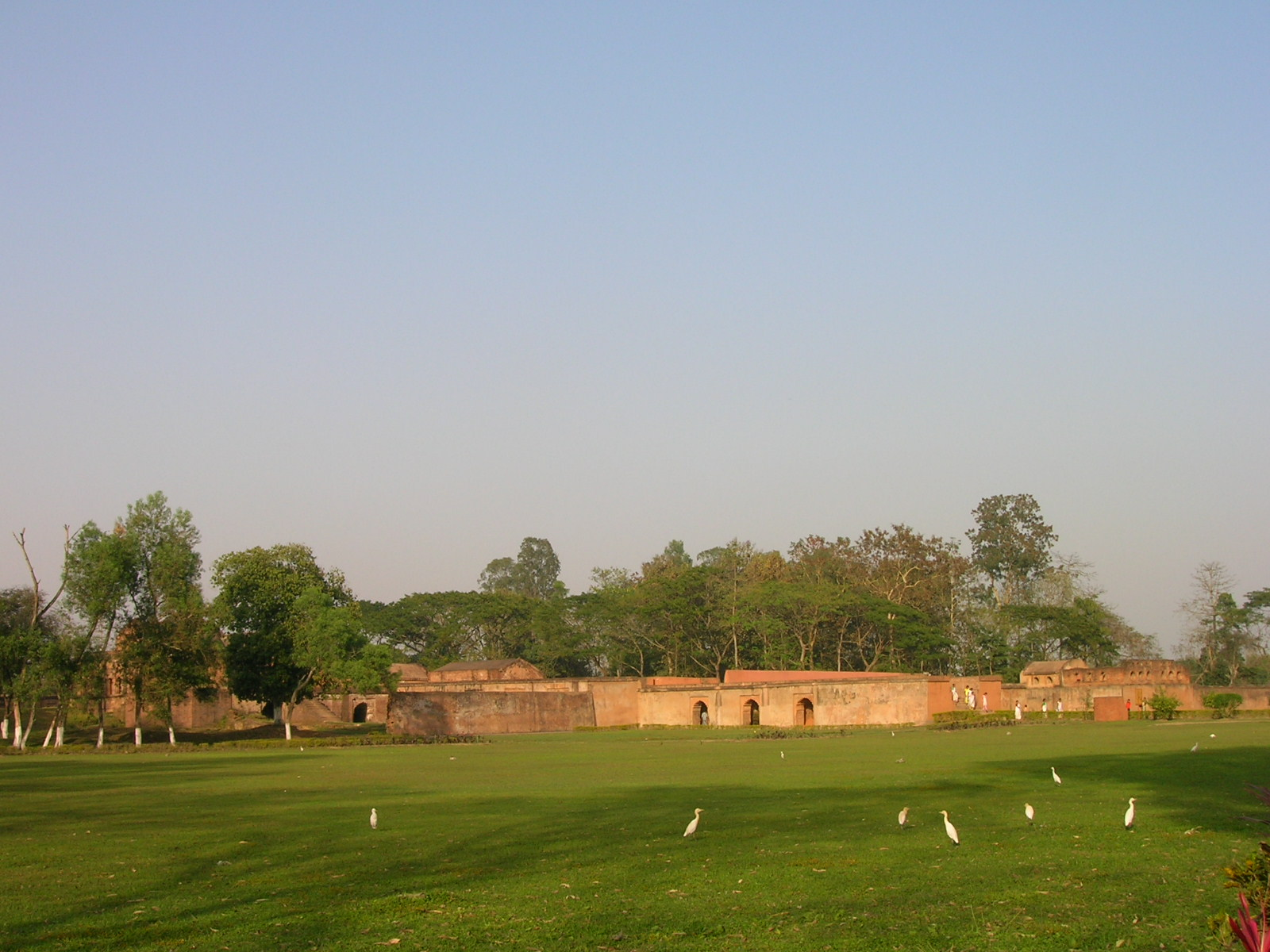
Talatal Ghar

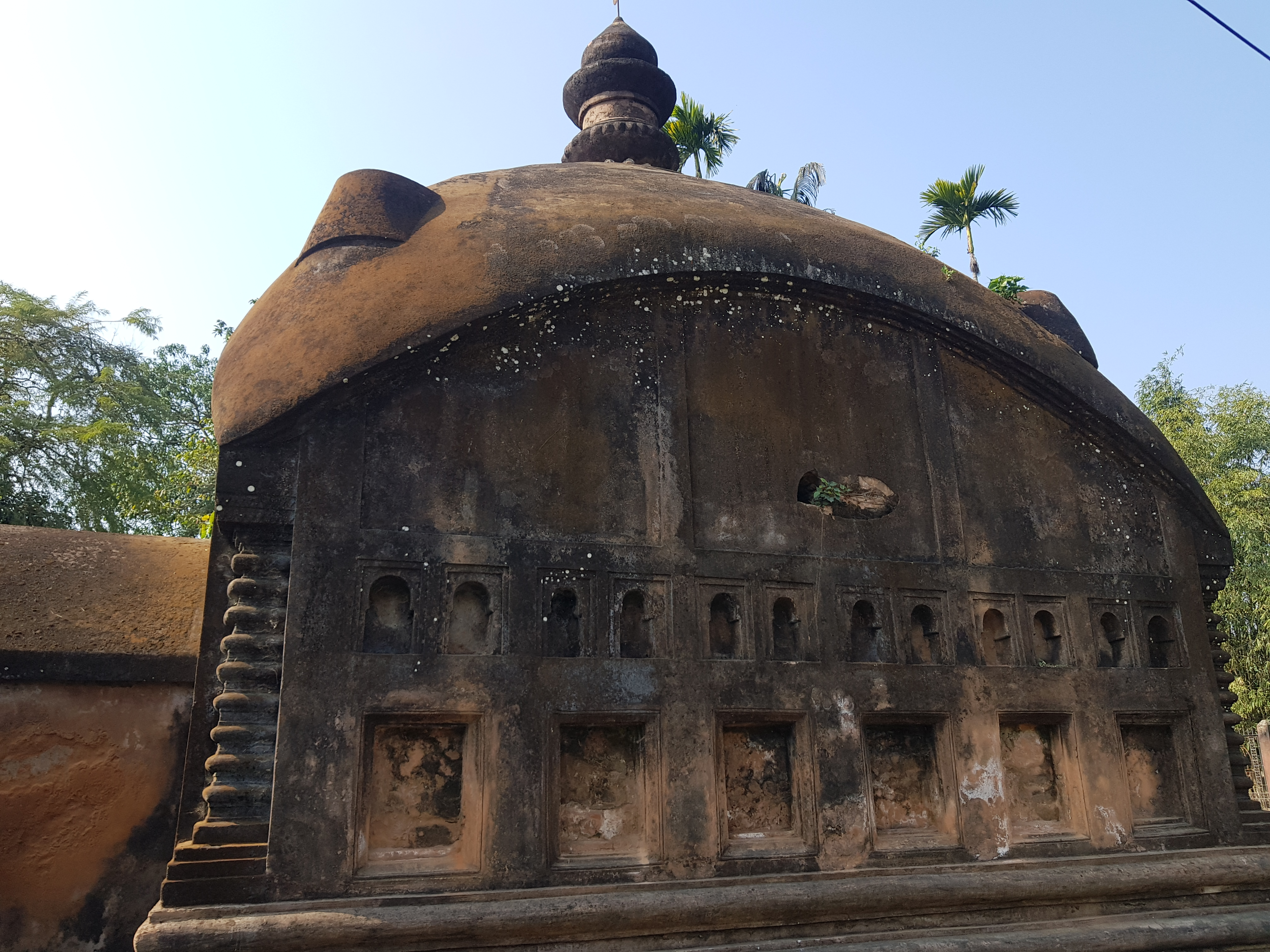
Gauri ballabh dol

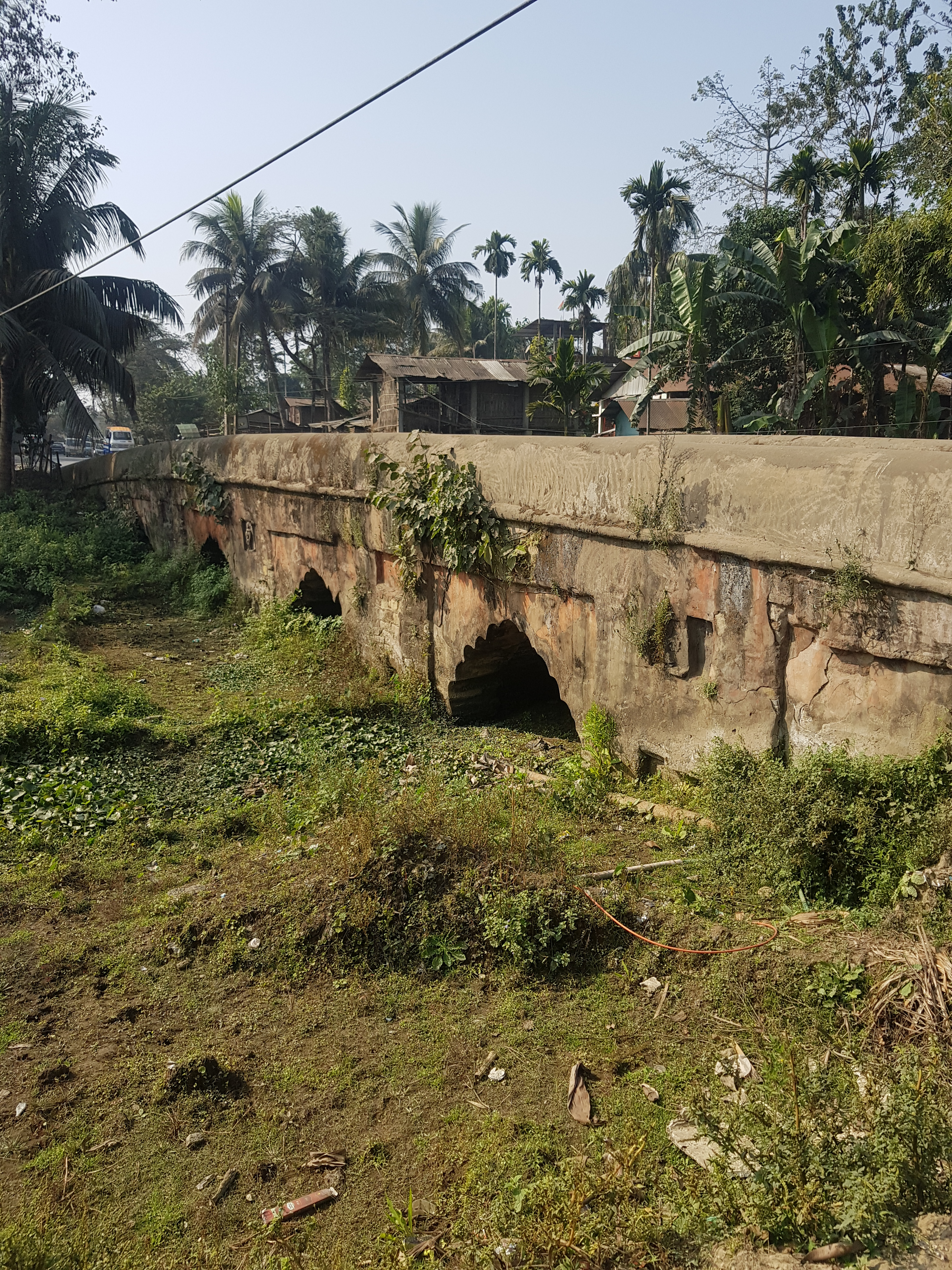
Namdang Stone Bridge

== See also ==
- Garhgaon

== Bibliography ==
- Gupta, Rajatananda Das (1982), Art of Mediaeval Assam, Cosmo
- Gogoi, Padmeshwar (1968), The Tai and the Tai Kingdoms, Guwahati: Gauhati University
- Gogoi, Khagen (2017). Ahom warfare evolution nature and strategy. Gauhati University.
