= Talatal Ghar =

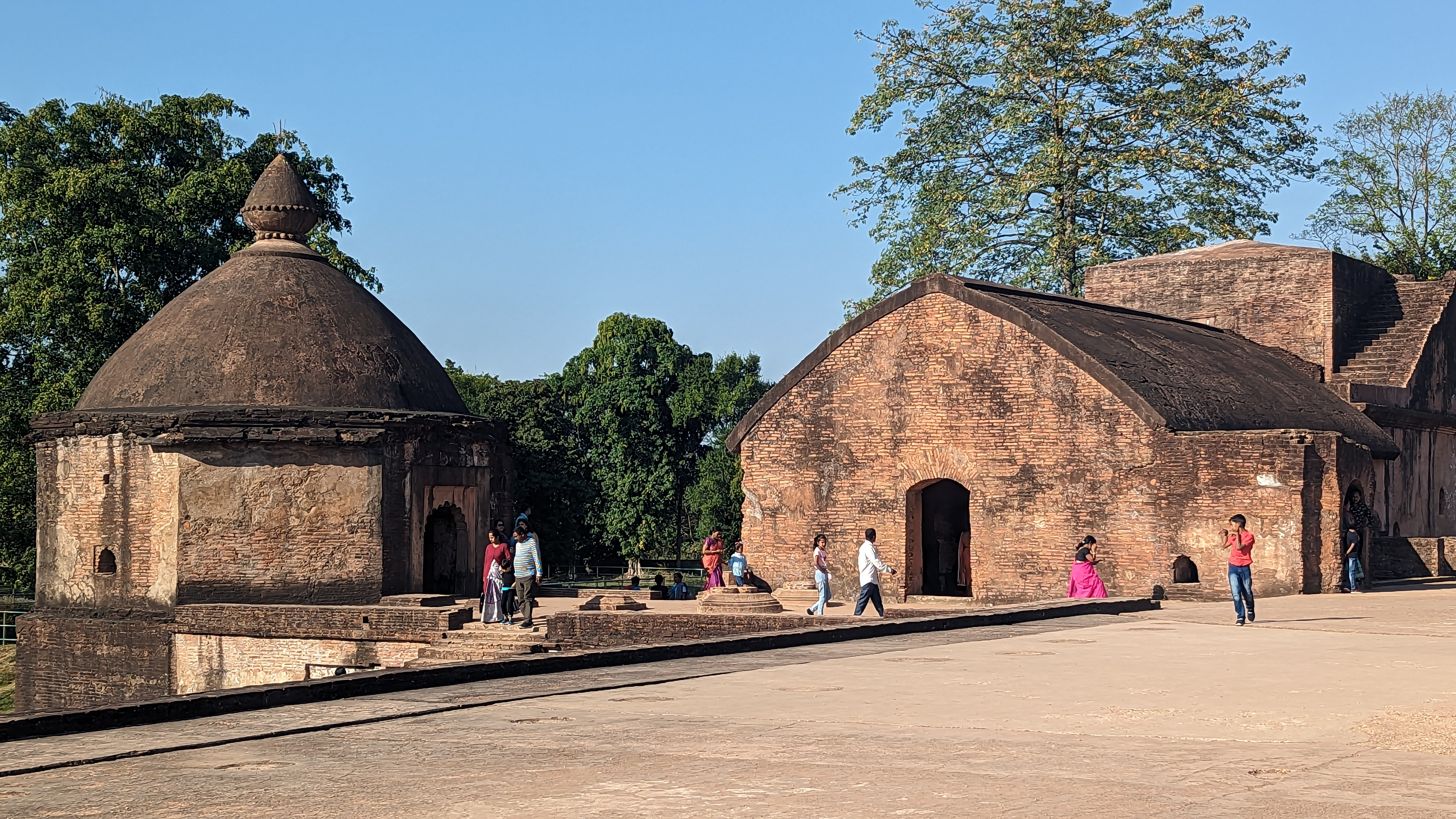
- View of talatal ghar from one side

General information
- Architectural style: Mixed Architecture
- Location: Sivasagar; Assam; India
- Coordinates: 26.9663056°N 94.6246917°E
- Completed: 1765; 261 years ago
- Client: Suremphaa

Technical details
- Structural system: Bricks and indigenous varieties of cement

Design and construction
- Architect: Ghanashyam Khanikar
- Other designers: Seng Konwari

The Talatal Ghar [tɔlatɔl ɡʱɔɹ]) is an 18th-century palace and military base located in Rangpur, 4 kilometres (2.5 mi) from present-day Sivasagar, Assam, India. It is the largest of the monument built during the Ahom era. King Rudra Singha was responsible for the construction of Kareng Ghar, but the present structure was built by king Rajeswar Singha (Surempha). It was initially built as an army base. It had 2 tunnels and 3 underground floors. Currently this structure is in dilapidated condition, the present ruins betray the grandeur that the palace was once endowed with.

== History ==
King Rudra Singha had shifted his capital from Garhgaon to Rangpur in 1707 (then known as Tengabari). He started the construction of the Talatal Ghar, but it was initially built of semi-permanent materials. He especially brought an architect from Cooch Behar, Ghanashyam, whom he appointed as the chief architect and entrusted him with the duty of designing the new capital city of Rangpur. Later his successor king Rajeswar Singha constructed the Talatal Ghar with major additions in bricks. The upper floor which is currently exposed had earlier chambers made of wood, timber and other impermanent materials, which were burnt during the Moamaria rebellion, Burmese invasions and by British.

The palace consisted of 7 storeys, of which 4 storeys can be seen on the ground and the other 3 storeys which were underground were sealed and filled during the British era

== Architecture and Compartments ==
=== Talatal Ghar ===
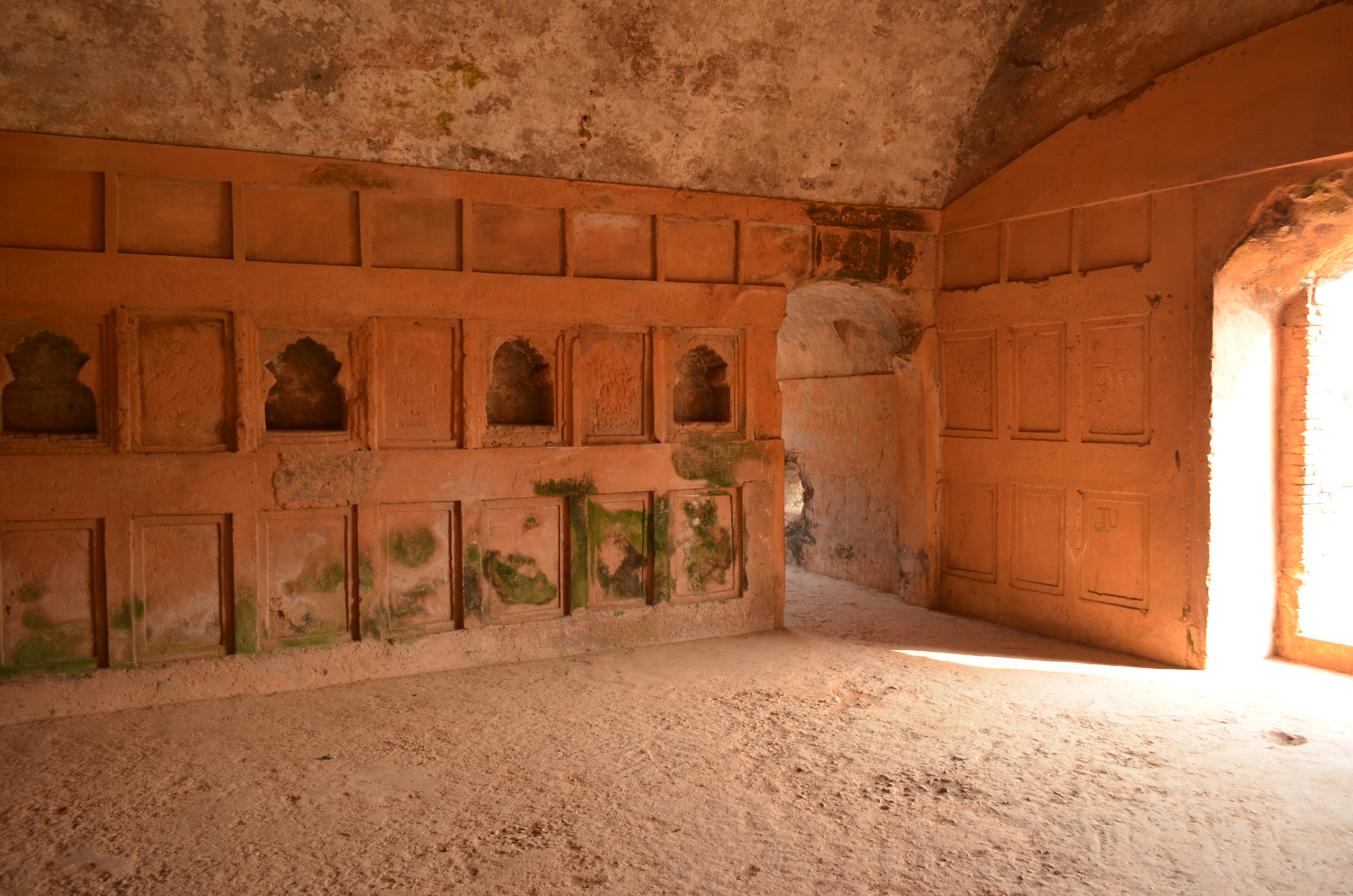
Room adjacent to the Puja Ghar, the wall of this chamber was used to keep the idols of the gods

The Talatal Ghar was initially built as an army base. It houses two secret tunnels, and three floors below ground level which were used as exit routes during the Ahom conflicts with other kingdoms or enemy attack (and which give the structure its name). At present the palace appears to be a building with irregular shape. The ground storey was used as horse stables, store rooms and, servant quarters. The royal apartments were located in the upper floors which are now to a great extent disappeared due to being made of semi-permanent materials.

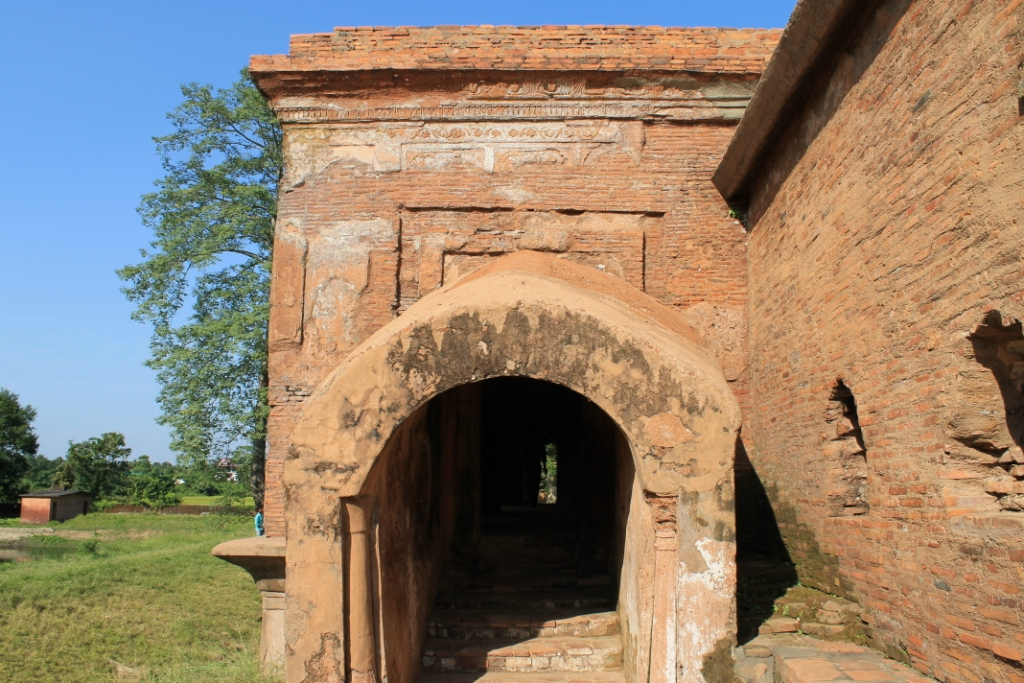
Entrance of Kareng (Royal-Chamber) with few surviving floral relics on the top

(Swargadeo Rajeswar Singha) added the three floors below ground, which make up the Talatal Ghar. This is made of brick and an indigenous type of cement (a mixture of Bora Chaul—a sticky variety of rice grain—eggs of swan, etc.). The Talatal Ghar had two secret tunnels. One, about 3 kilometres (1.9 mi) in length, connected the Talatal Ghar to the Dikhow River, while the other, 16 kilometres (9.9 mi) long, led to the Garhgaon Palace, and was used as an escape route in case of an enemy attack.

=== Chambers and Compartments ===
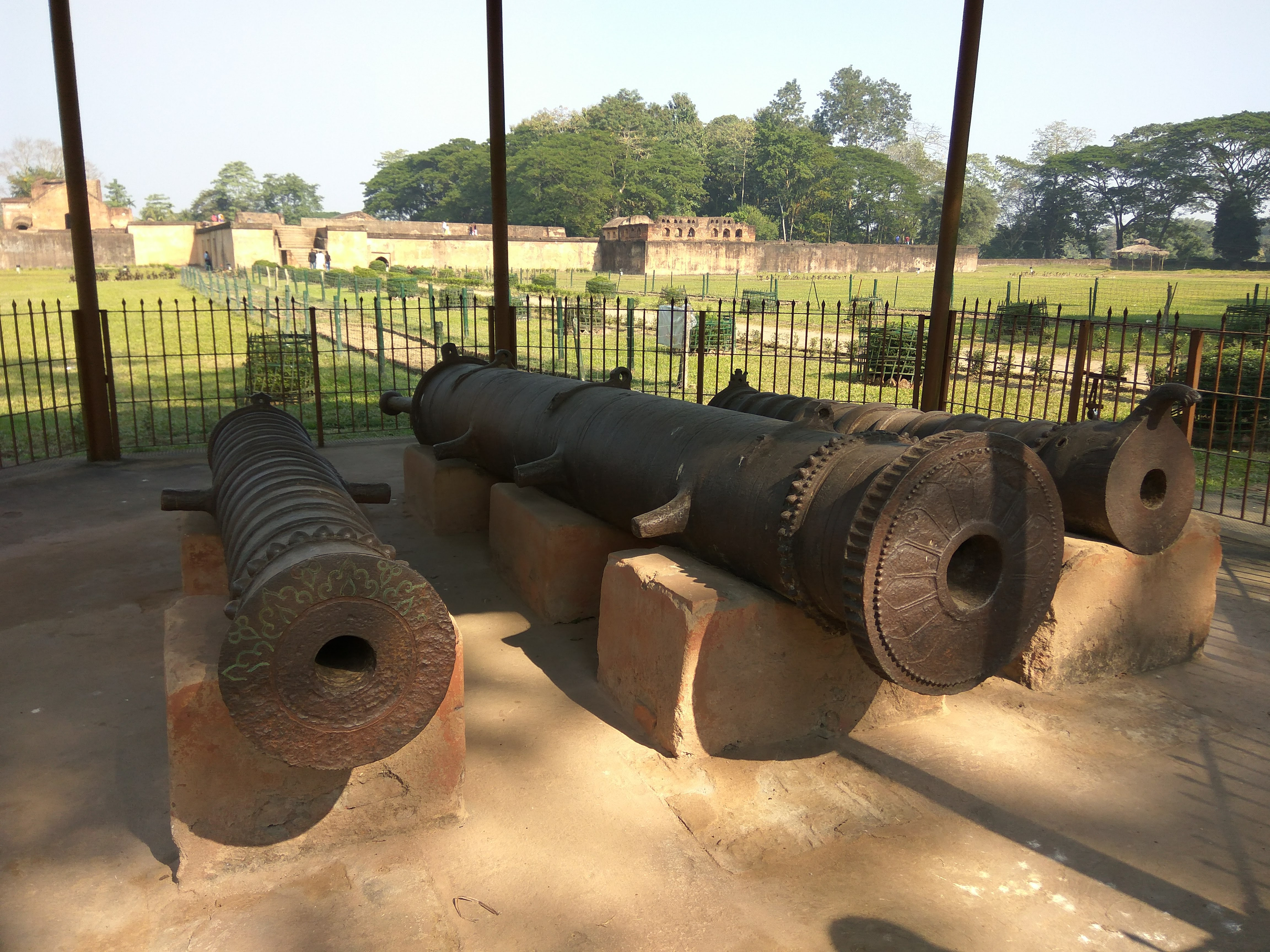
Three big cannons kept in Talatal Ghar. In middle there is one of the biggest cannon produced during Ahom era named as Bahikhowa Barphukanar Bortop

From east to west, several rooms run along a long corridor; and from north to south are numerous smaller wings. The ground floor served as stables, store rooms, and servants' quarters. The Kareng Ghar was built mainly of wood, which deteriorated over time. The royal apartments were on the upper story, of which only a few rooms now remain, close to an octagonal room on the northern wing which once served as the prayer house. There are stairs leading up to the terrace. To the north of the staircase, there is the Mantranaghar (Conference-room) and east of it there is the Barcharā (Assembly hall) which was made of bamboo and wooden pillars near it, was the royal archives called Ghandia Bhoral under the Gandhia Baruah and Gandhia Phukan. To the east there is the assembly hall of Nyay-Sodha-Phukan (Court of chief justice), to the south there is the assembly hall of Bhitarual Phukan (the secret Assembly Hall). An isolated room stands in the south which is believed to have been used by the queen during her confinement. On the south-west stands another isolated room, possibly the royal kitchen. The interior and exterior of the palace were once beautifully engraved with reliefs of hunting scenes, floral designs, god and goddesses which only a few has survived.

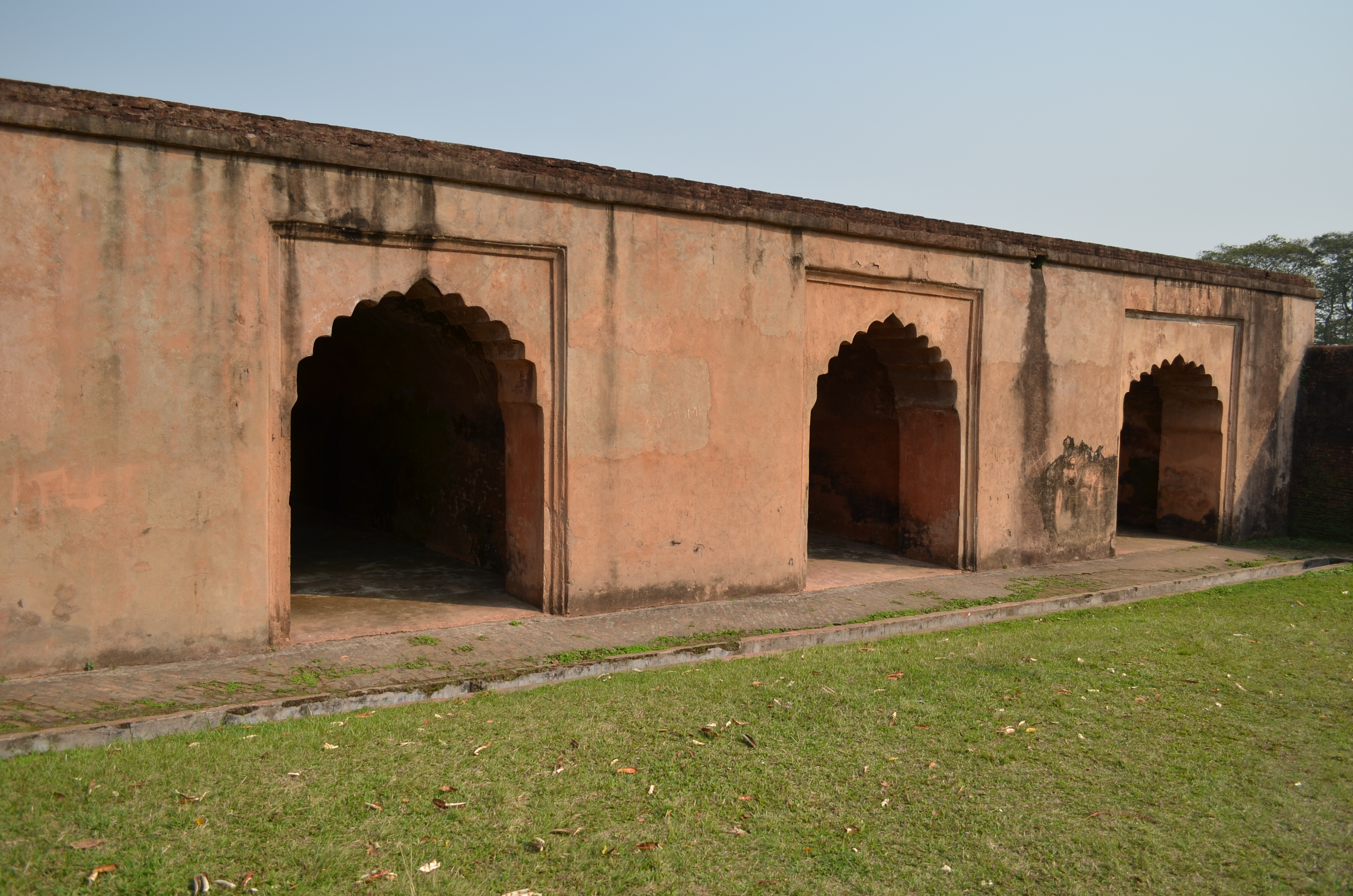
Horse stables in the ground floor

The Rangpur Palace was once surrounded by a brick fortification and an earthen fort (Garh) with dikes filled with water. There is a Gola Ghar built in Do-chala style, for the purpose of storing (gunpowder and ammunition), near the palace.

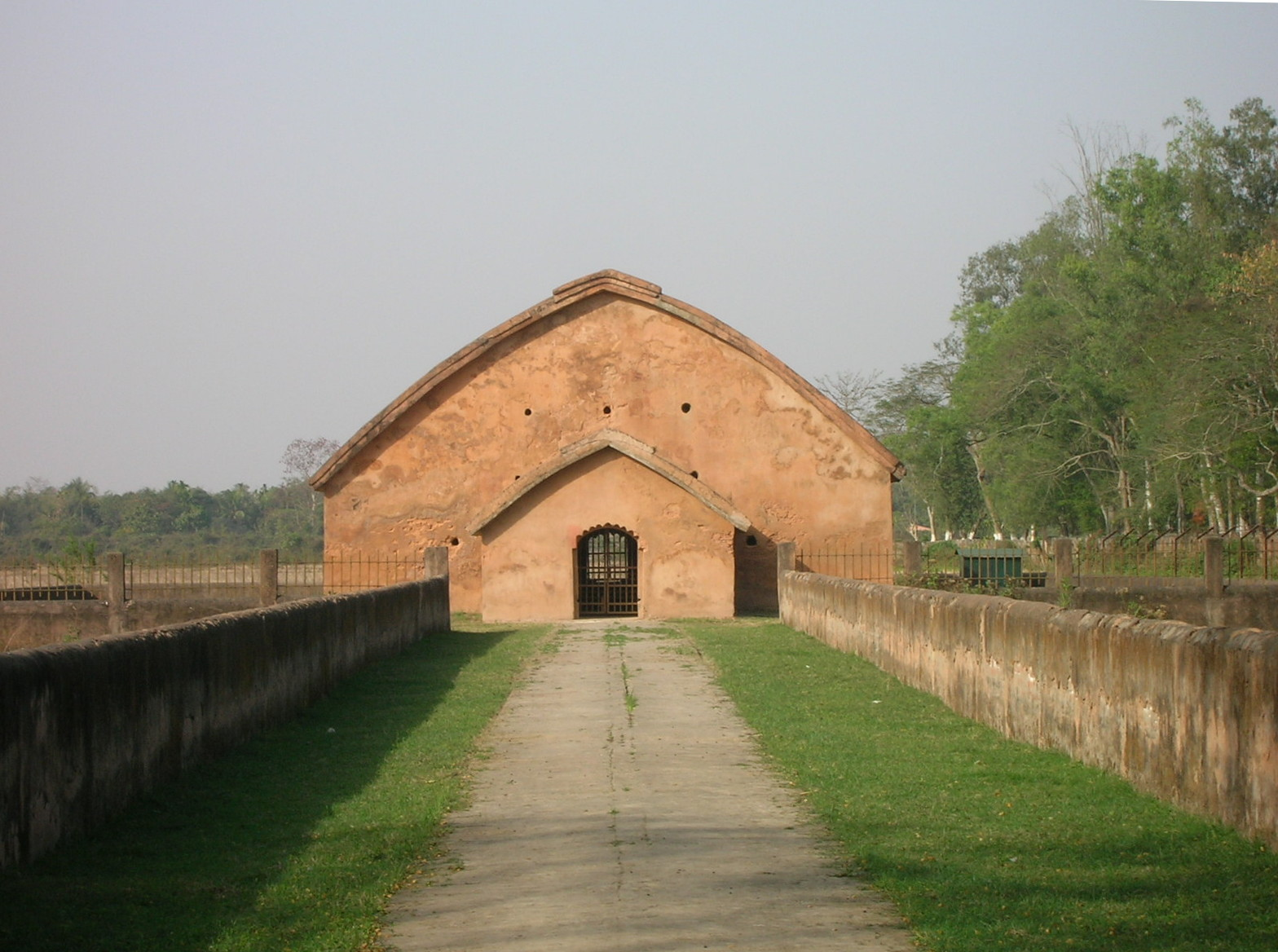
Gola Ghar (Magazine House) near Talatal

== Archaeological Survey ==
Archaeological excavations of Talatal Ghar in 2000–2001, unearthed a buried structure on the North-western and North-eastern side of the complex. Among the archaeological remains were brick platform, pathway, long walls, drain made of terracotta pipes and the ceramic objects found were vases, vessels, dishes, bowls etc.

However, the first Ground Penetrating Survey (GPR) in the northeast, undertaken at two Ahom monuments in the Sivasagar district in early April 2015, did not reveal the existence of any secret tunnel. The survey was carried out by IIT Kanpur, in collaboration with the Guwahati circle of the Archaeological Survey of India, over a period of five days at Talatal Ghar and Ahom Royal Palace (Kareng Ghar), both in Sivasagar district.

== Photo gallery ==
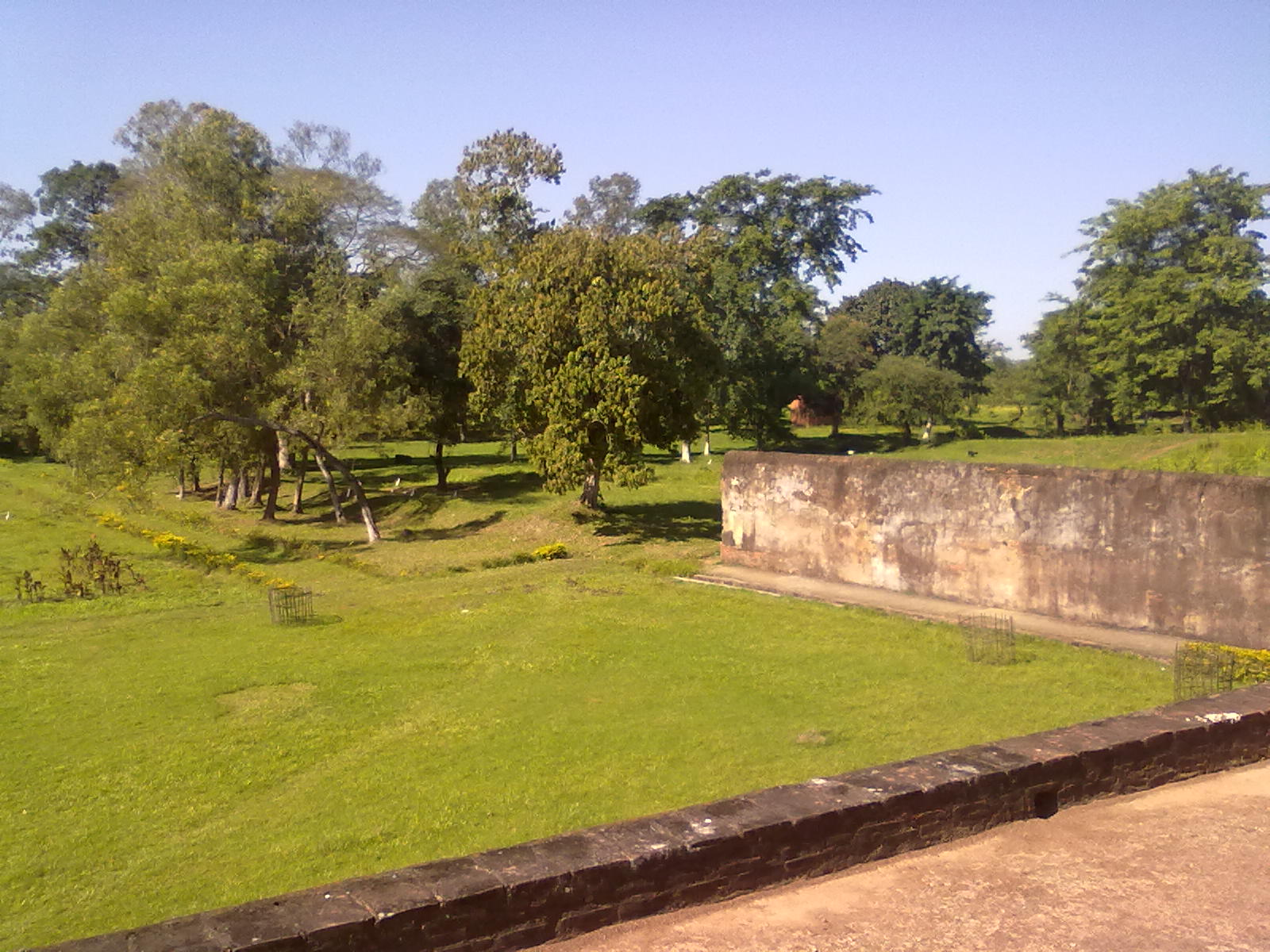
Remains of Brick rampart in Talatl Ghar enclosure

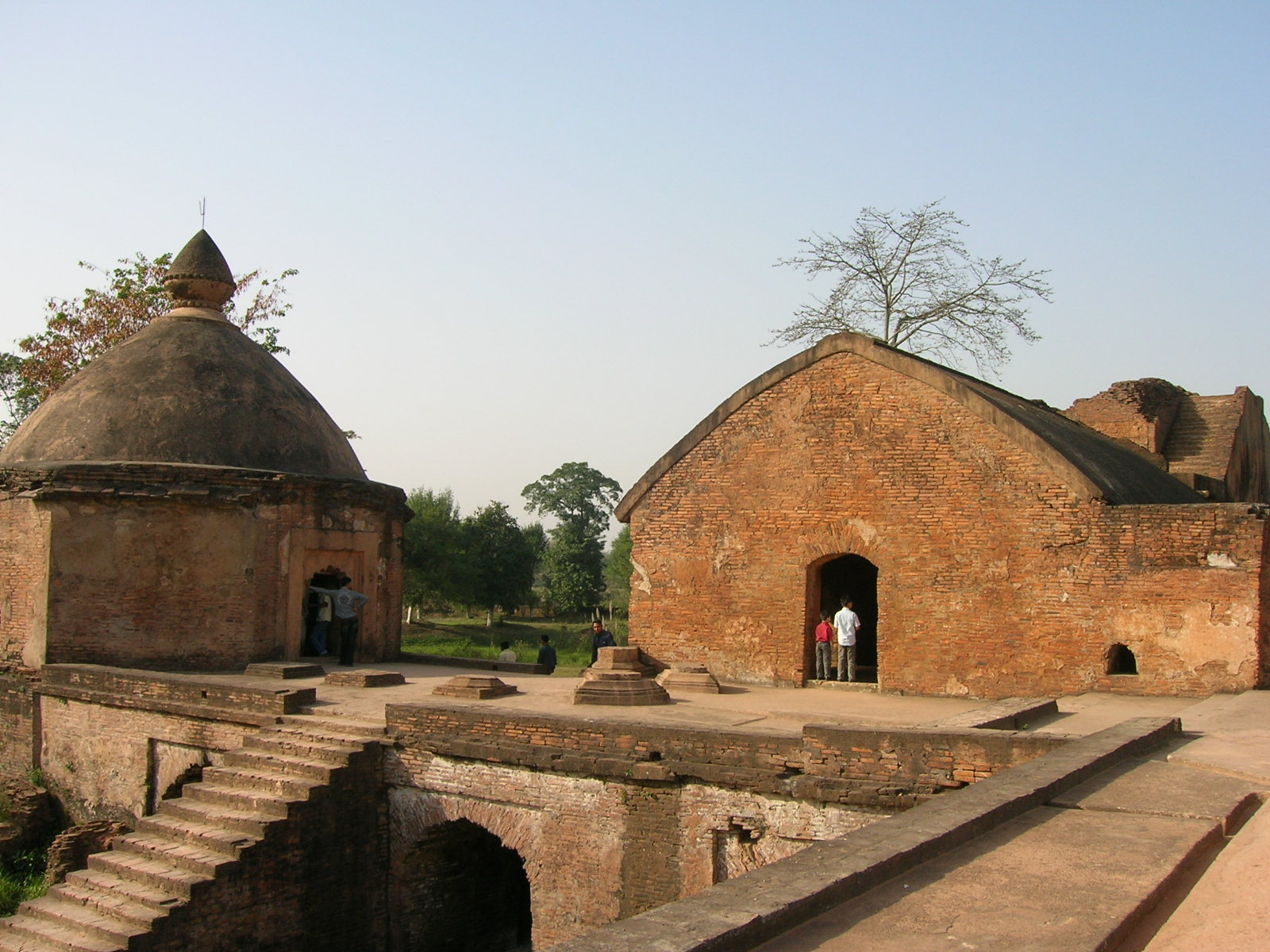
Puja Ghar and the surviving royal apartments

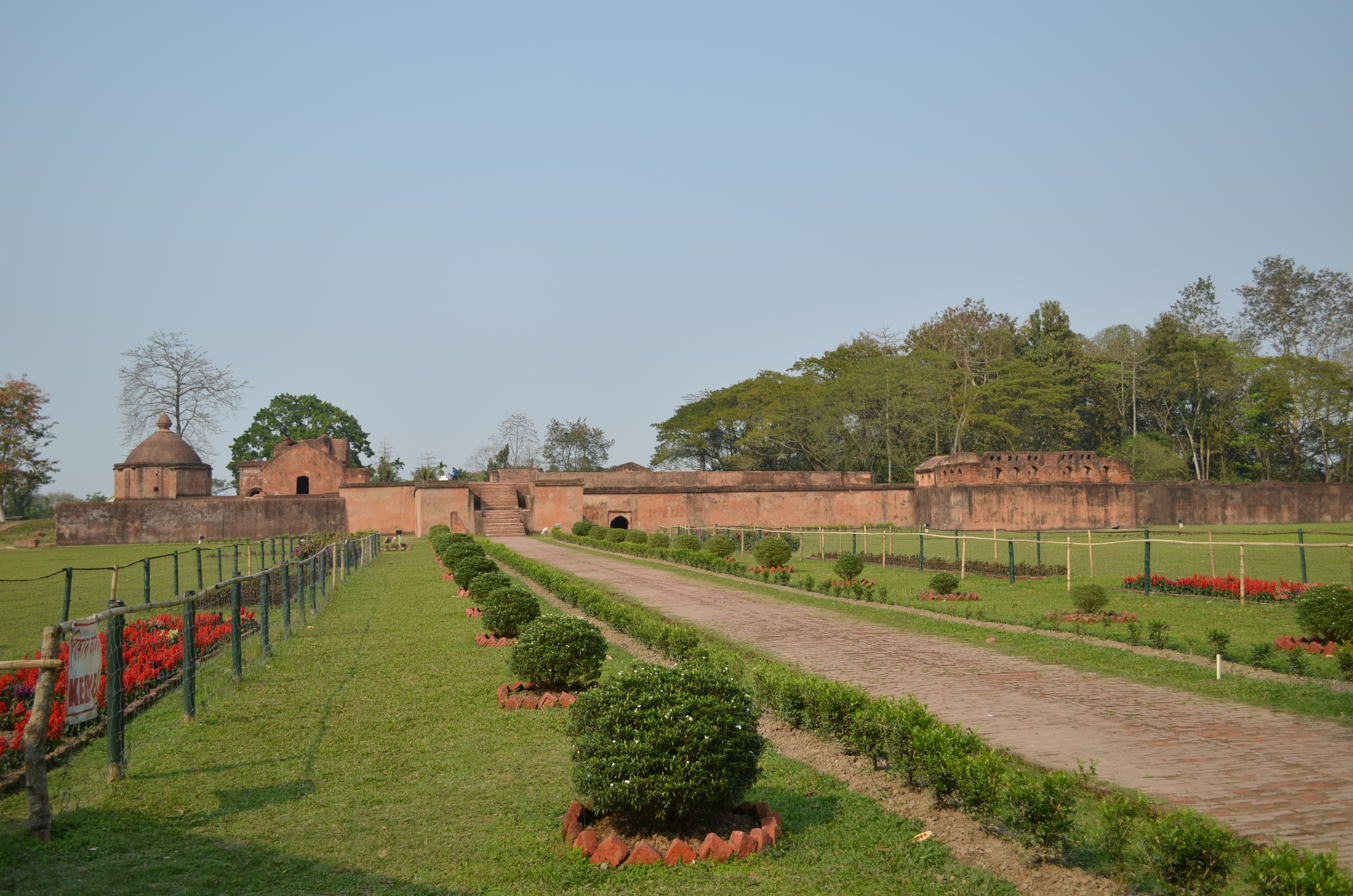
Front view of Talatal Ghar

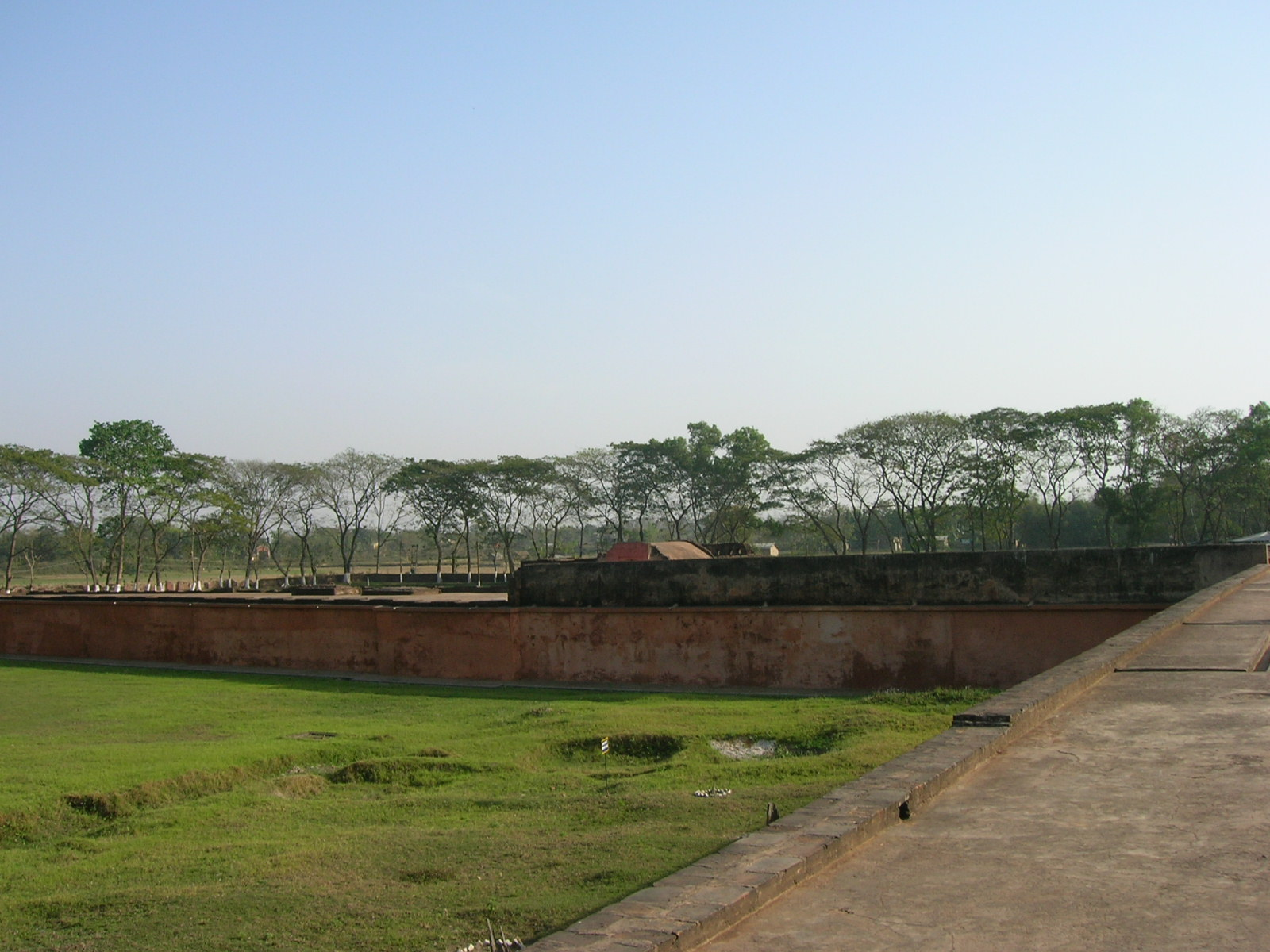
Side view of Nyay-Sodha-Phukan's Barchora

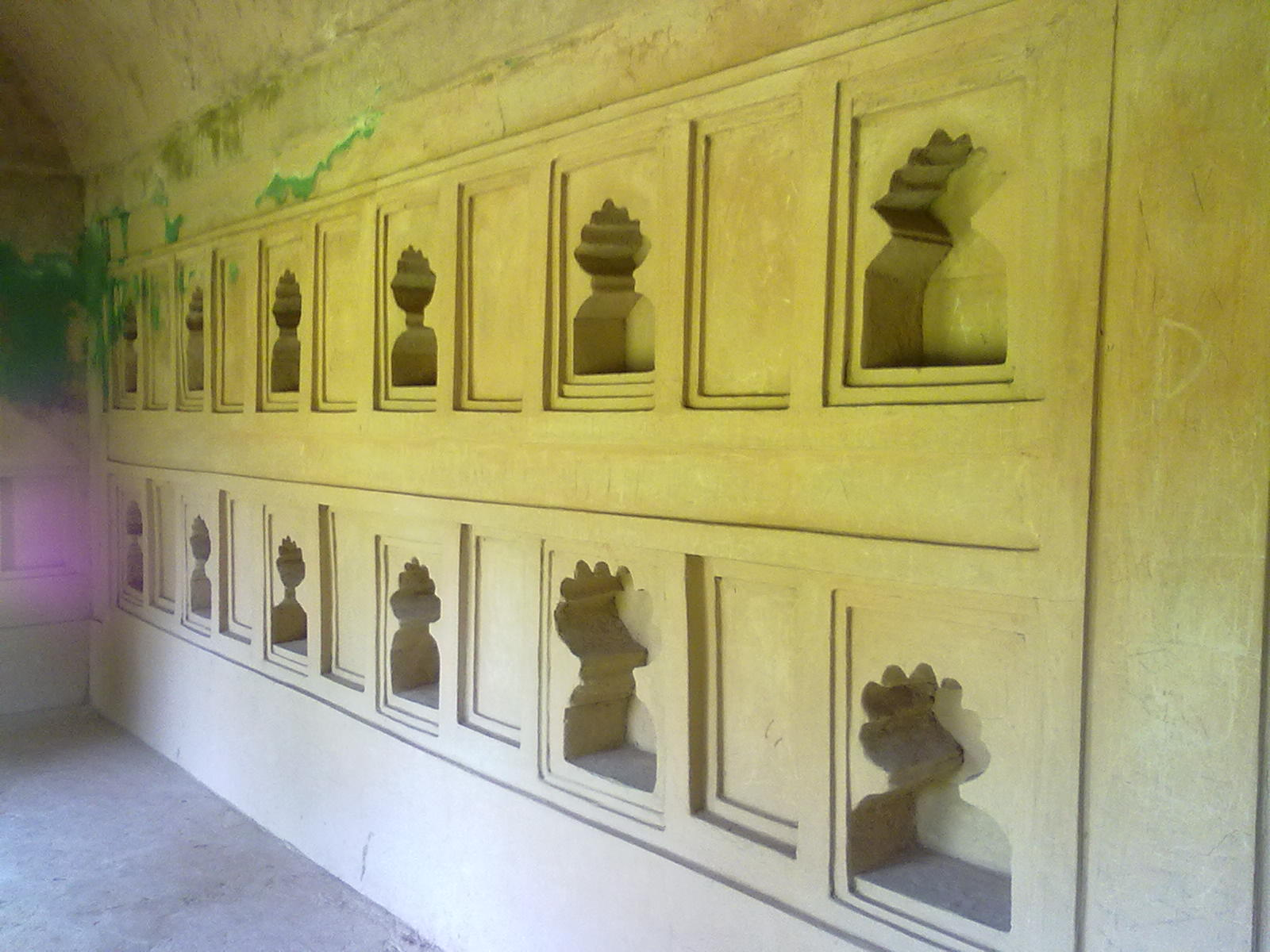
Inside of Talatal Ghar

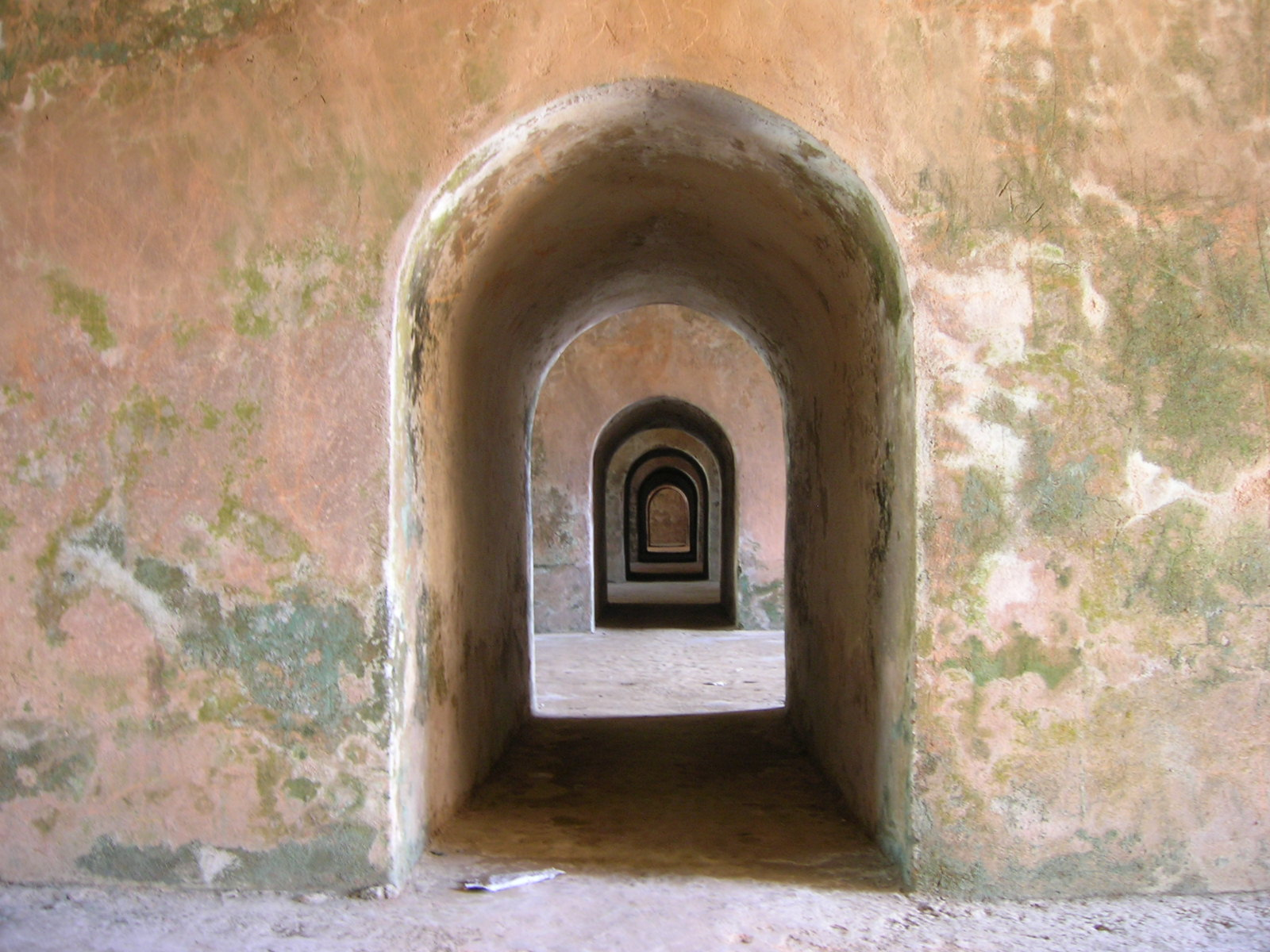
Illusion at Talatal Ghar

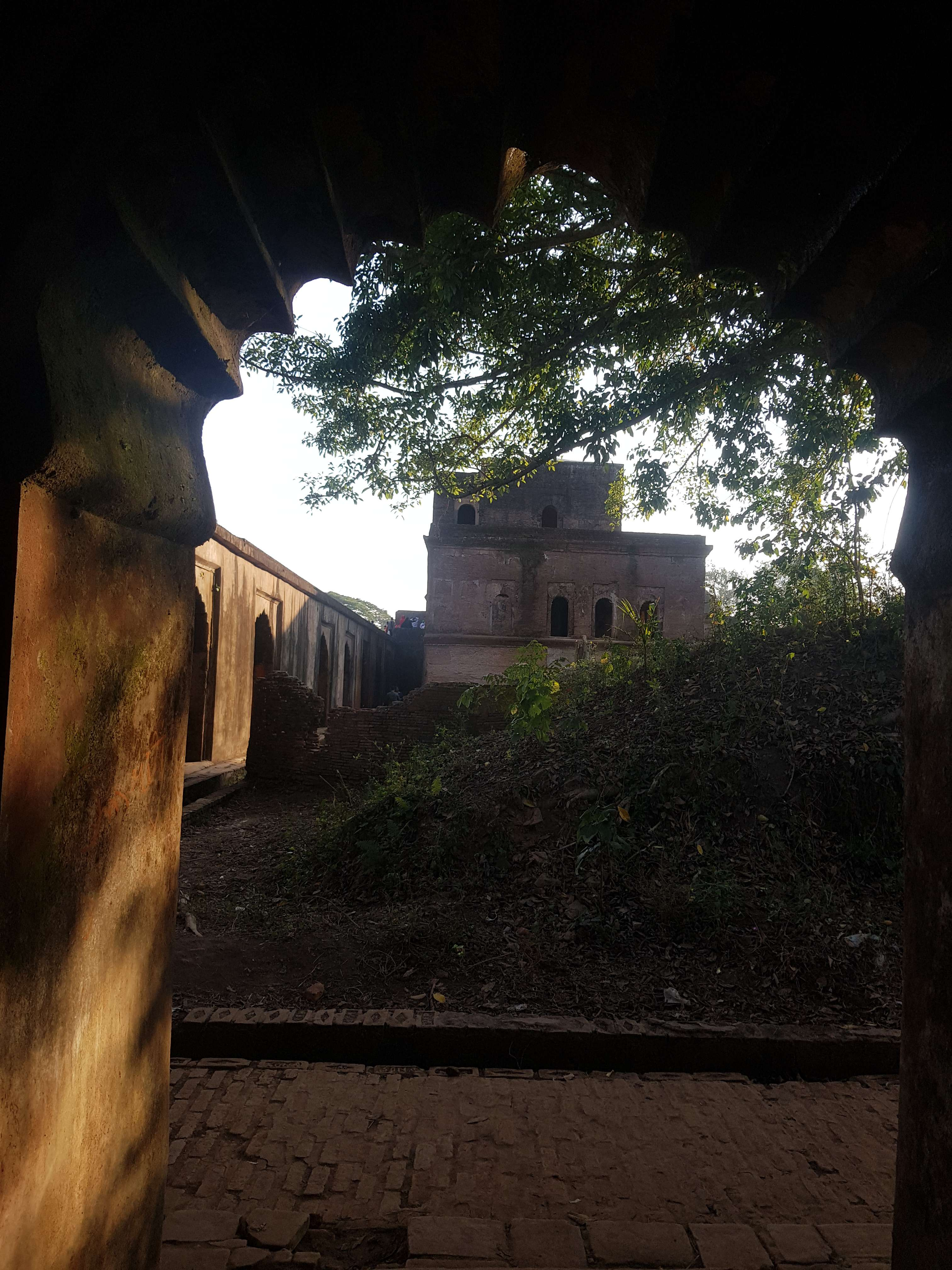
Side view of the royal chamber

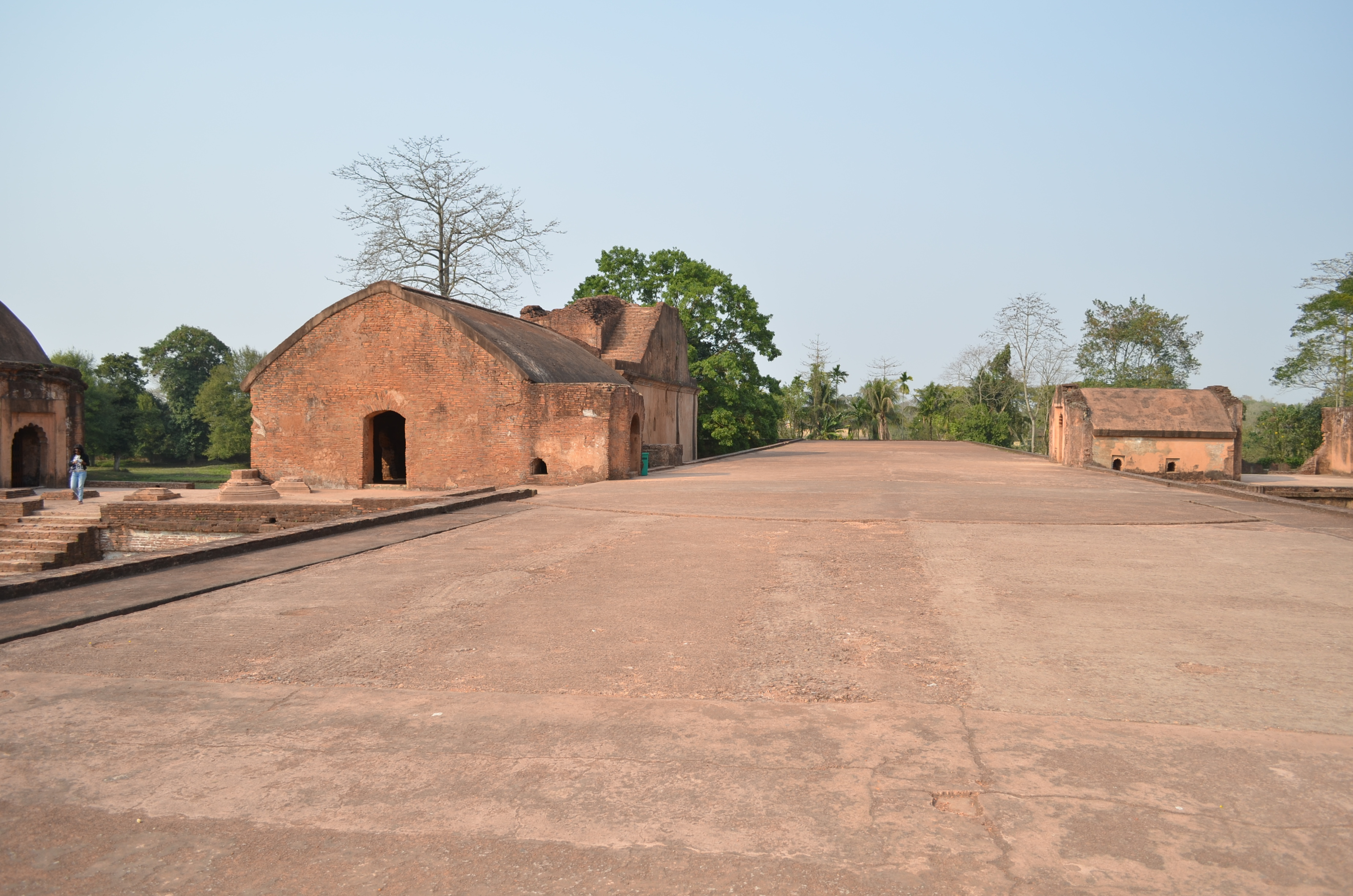
Bar Chora (royal-court)

== See also ==
- Rang Ghar, Sivasagar
- Sivasagar
- Charaideo

== Notes and references ==
Citations

Bibliography

- Nath, Hemanta Kumar (2005), Arowan, Rangpur Utsav Celebration Committee, Sivasagar
- Gogoi, Khagen (2017). Ahom warfare evolution nature and strategy. Gauhati University.
- Biswas, S.S. (2011), Sibsagar
- Gogoi, Prem (1999–2000), Boranjiya Parasa Rangpur, Rangpur Tinisah Basar Otjapan Samiti, Sivasagar
- Archaeological Survey Report (March 1902), Archaeological Survey Report, Government of India, Bengal Circle
- Narzary, Dharitri (2021). "Buranjis and the Asian History Writing Tradition". History and Sociology of South Asia. 15 (1–2): 7–27. doi:10.1177/22308075221077716. S2CID 247544118.
- Konwar, Paranan (2014). "Town Planning and Architectural Study of The Medieval Ahom Royal Palaces at Che-Hong (Gargāon) and Che-Muan (Rangpur)".
