= Namdang Stone Bridge =

Bridge in Assam, India

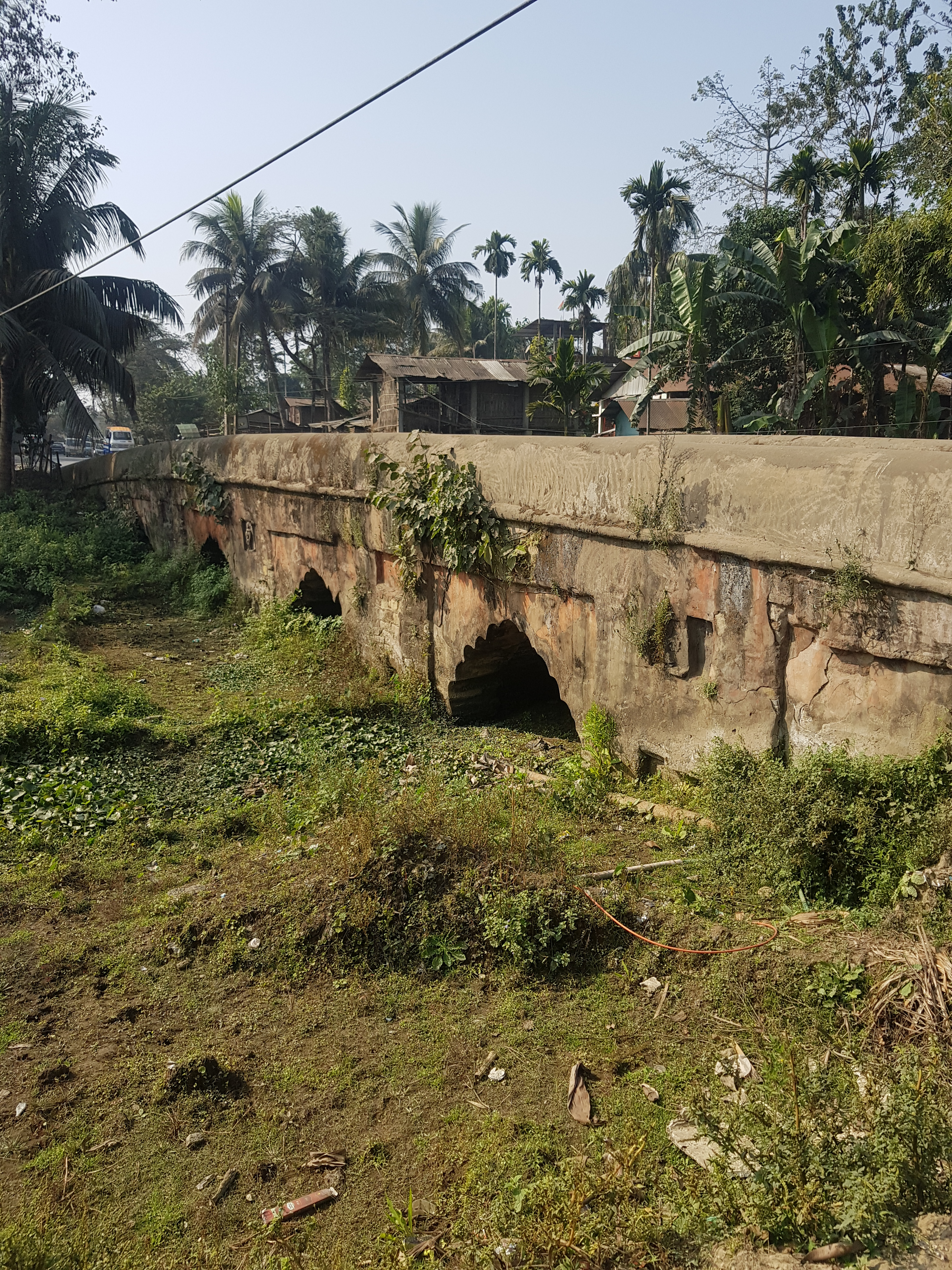
- Coordinates: 26°57′01″N 94°32′43″E
- Crosses: Namdang River
- Locale: Sibsagar, Assam
- Maintained by: Govt of Assam

Characteristics
- Design: Arch bridge
- Material: Stone
- Total length: 60 m
- Width: 6.5 m

History
- Construction end: 1703

The Namdang Stone Bridge is a historic bridge located a few kilometers away from Sibsagar town in Assam, India. It was constructed in 1703 by craftmen brought from Bengal during the reign of Ahom king Rudra Singha. The bridge is 60 m (200 ft) long, 6.5 m (21 ft) wide and 1.7 m (5.6 ft) high. It runs over the Namdang (Tai-Ahom : Nam= Water; Dang=Red) river, a tributary of the Dikhou river. The present National Highway 37 is passing over it. The unique characteristic of the bridge is that it was cut out from a single solid piece of rock hundred years of age. The bridge is a little curved in shape. The bridge connects Sibsagar town to Jorhat and other districts in the west.

== History ==
King Pratap Singha built a town on its bank and much later Rudra Singha constructed a masonry bridge over it. According to Peter Wade, the Namdang bridge was regarded as the western gate of the military capital of Rangpur, and was capable of being rendered a post of great strength, as the Moamoria rebels experienced. Many battles were fought in the vicinity during the reign of Gaurinath Singha and the Moamaria rebels. In 1825 a decisive battle took place between the British East India Company and Burmese in the bank of the Namdang river. In 2019, local heritage groups petitioned the Assam Archaeological Department to initiate preservation efforts, underscoring the beidge's historic and architectural value.

== Architecture ==
Constructed as a slightly curved stone arch bridge, it spans 60 m in length, 6-6.5 m in width and stands about 1.7 m high. Uniquely, much of the structure is carved from a single massive rock, with six culverts allowing water flow beneath. Instead of modern cement, builders employed an organic mortar blend a mix of rice paste, eggs, black lentils, molasses, and lime which has contributed to its surprising resilience against floods and seismic activity India. Decorative sculptural panels carved into the arches further testify to the artistry of Ahom craftsmen. Government plans to build a heritage park design include traditional Assamese architectural elements and digital displays explaining its unique construction techniques.

== See also ==
- List of bridges in India
