= Rangnath Dol =

Hindu temple in India

Ranganath Dol
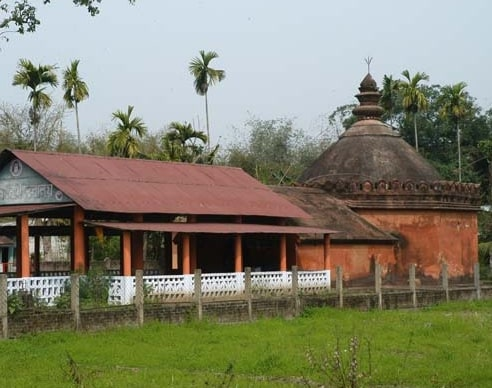

Religion
- Affiliation: Hinduism
- Deity: Shiva

Location
- Location: Sivasagar
- State: Assam
- Country: India
- Interactive map of Ranganath Dol

Architecture
- Creator: Rudra Singha
- Completed: 1703; 323 years ago
- Temple: 1

Rangnath Dol is a Hindu temple dedicated to the god Shiva on the bank of Joysagar Tank. It was built in 1703 by Sukhrungphaa near the main gateway on the way from the Joysagar tank to the Talatal Ghar. Large numbers of devotees continue to visit and offer puja in this temple. The sanctum of the temple enshrines a lingam. A do-chala mandapa is attached to the sanctum.
