= Rang Ghar =

Historic building in India

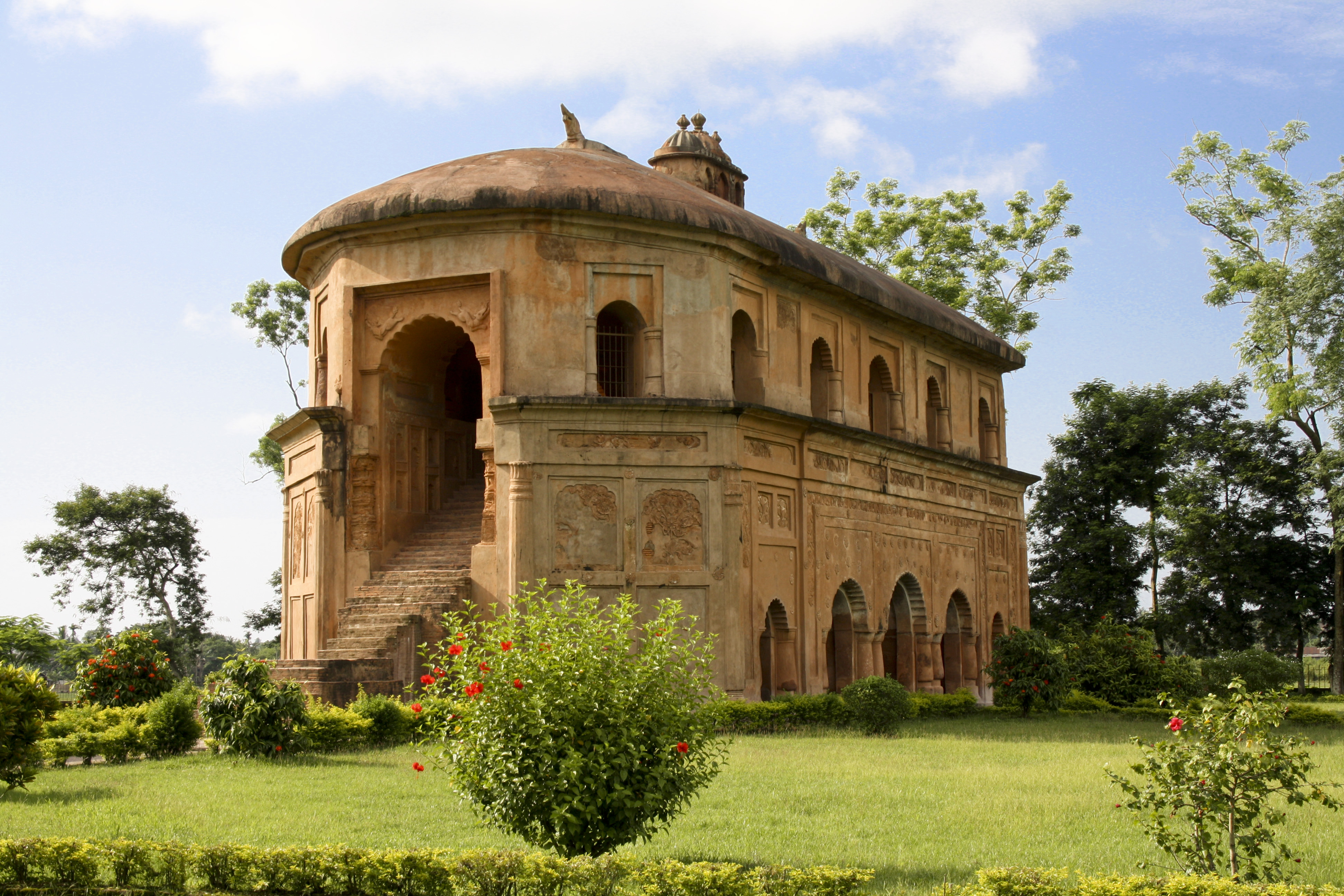
- View of the Rang Ghar from the gardens
- Interactive map of the Rang Ghar area

General information
- Architectural style: Ahom Architecture
- Location: Sivasagar, Assam, India
- Coordinates: 26.9670°N 94.6190°E
- Construction started: 1746; 280 years ago

Technical details
- Structural system: Bricks and Indigenous type of cement

Design and construction
- Main contractor: Pramatta Singha

The Rang Ghar (Assamese: [ɹɔŋɡʱɔɹ]), (rong ghor meaning "House of Entertainment") is a two-storeyed building which once served as the royal sports-pavilion where Ahom kings and nobles were spectators at games like buffalo fights and other sports at Rupahi Pathar (pathar meaning "field" in Assamese) - particularly during the Rongali Bihu festival in the Ahom capital of Rangpur.

It is three kilometres (1.9 mi) away from the center of Sivasagar Town. Situated by the side of the Assam Trunk Road, it lies to the northeast of the Rangpur Palace, a almost seven-storied royal complex comprising the Talatal Ghar and the Kareng Ghar.

== History ==
Ranghar is said to be one of the oldest surviving amphitheaters in Asia, the building was first constructed during the reign of Swargadeo Rudra Singha with bamboo and wood. It was later rebuilt with brick by Swargadeo Pramatta Singha in 1744 - 1751 A.D.

== Architecture ==
The roof of the Rang Ghar is shaped like an inverted royal Ahom long boat. The base of the monument has a series of arched entrances, while atop the roof sits a decorative pair of carved stone crocodiles.

Many of the arched entrances have retained little more than their brick framework, with mere vestiges of sculptural adornments here and there. The Ahoms, who used special, thin, baked bricks, did not use cement but a paste of rice and eggs as mortar for their construction, a pulse called Maati Maah and a fish named Borali Mach in Assamese. They also made use of powdered mixed lime and bricks to cover the surface of the inner walls. It is said that this layer of powder used to keep the inside of the Rang Ghar cool.

The adjoining field, known as Rupohi Pothar, wore a festive look when games like bull-fight, cock-fight, elephant fight, wrestling, etc., were held on different occasions during the Ahom rule. Rang Ghar, besides standing as the royal pavilion, also contributed in spreading the games to different parts of the kingdom and its neighbouring States.

About a kilometer to the northeast of the Rang Ghar is the Joysagar Pukhuri. This is a man-made tank, encompassing an area of about 120 bighas of land. It was dug in memory of Joymoti Konwari, mother of Rudra Singha (1665 – 1714) - the most illustrious of the Ahom kings.

== Architectural Influence of the Rang Ghar ==
- The entrance to the Srimanta Sankaradeva Kalakshetra at Guwahati echoes the Rang Ghar.
- The Rang Ghar was the logo of the 33rd National Games held in Guwahati, in February 2007.

== Present condition ==
Frequent earthquakes and seismic surveys being undertaken by the Oil and Natural Gas Corporation are posing a threat to Assam's 18th century amphitheatre Rang Ghar. At least 35 cracks have been noticed at various places on the walls of the historic Rang Ghar.

== Future ==
On 14 April 2023, on the occasion of Bohag Bihu, Prime Minister Narendra Modi laid the foundation of beautification project of the monument. The project is expected to provide facilities like a fountain show, a boat house with a jetty, an artisan village and food stalls.

== Gallery ==
Rang Ghar view from the entrance

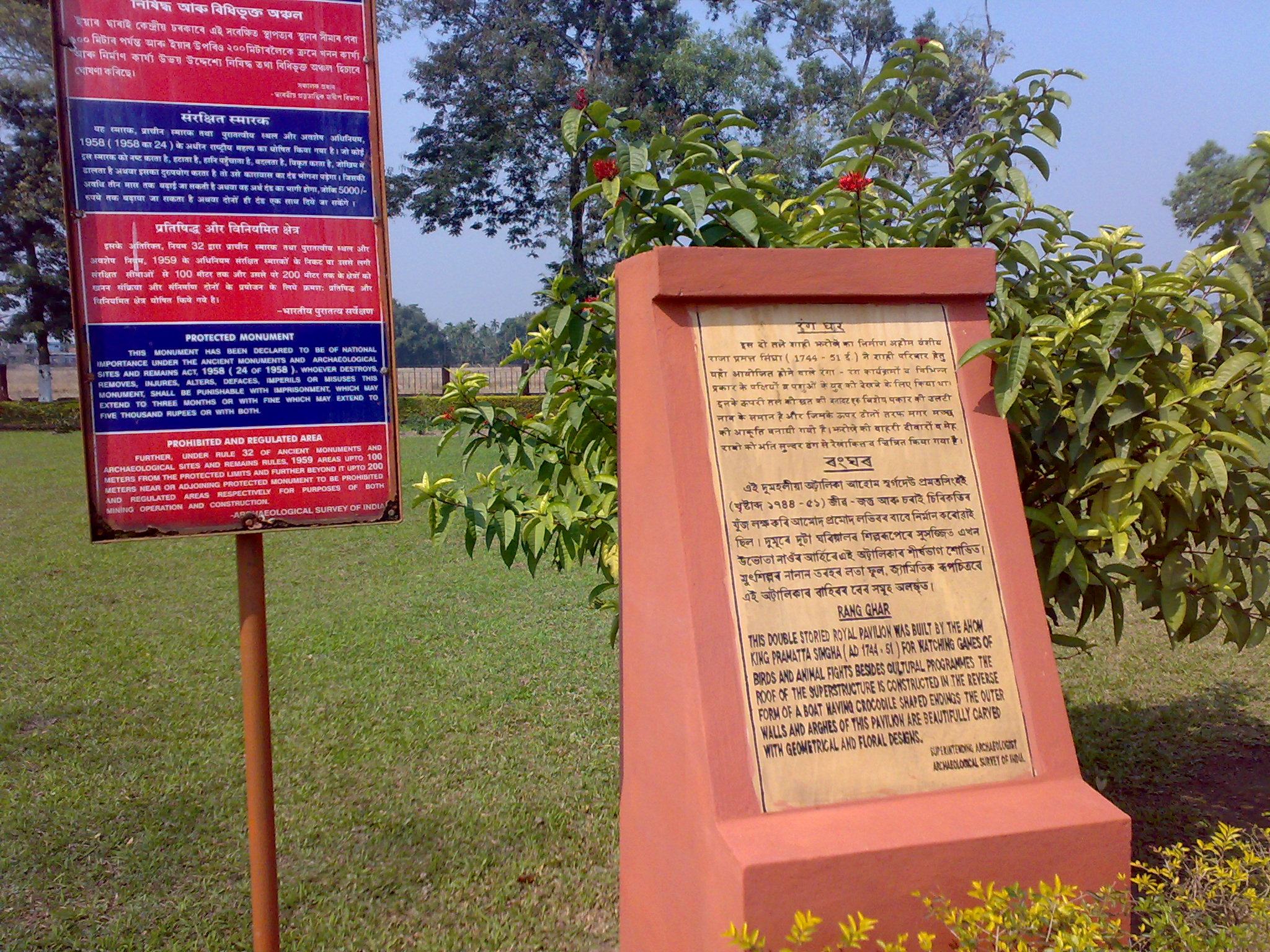
Rang Ghar signage by ASI

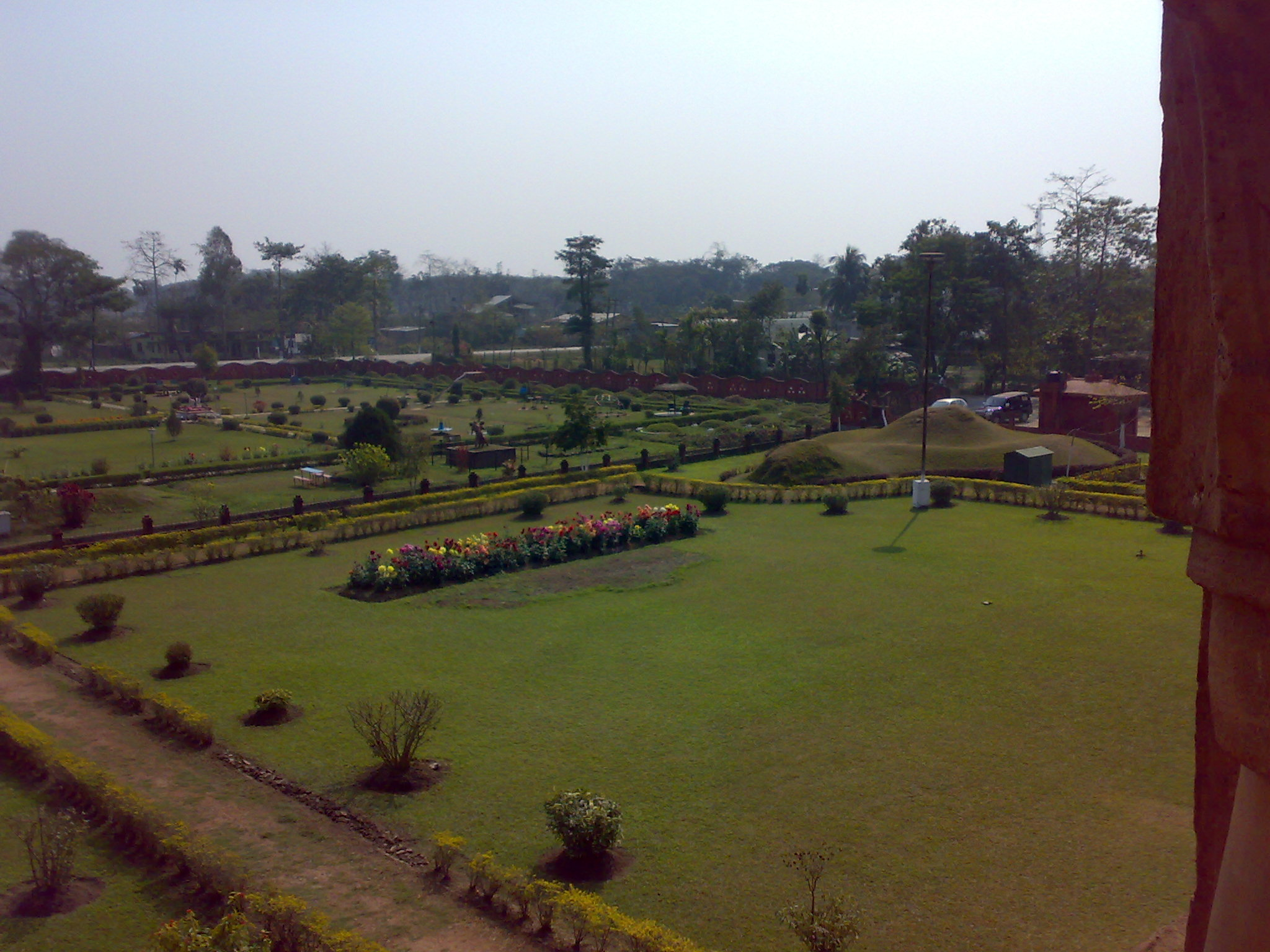
View of the gardens from the Rang Ghar pavilion's upper floors

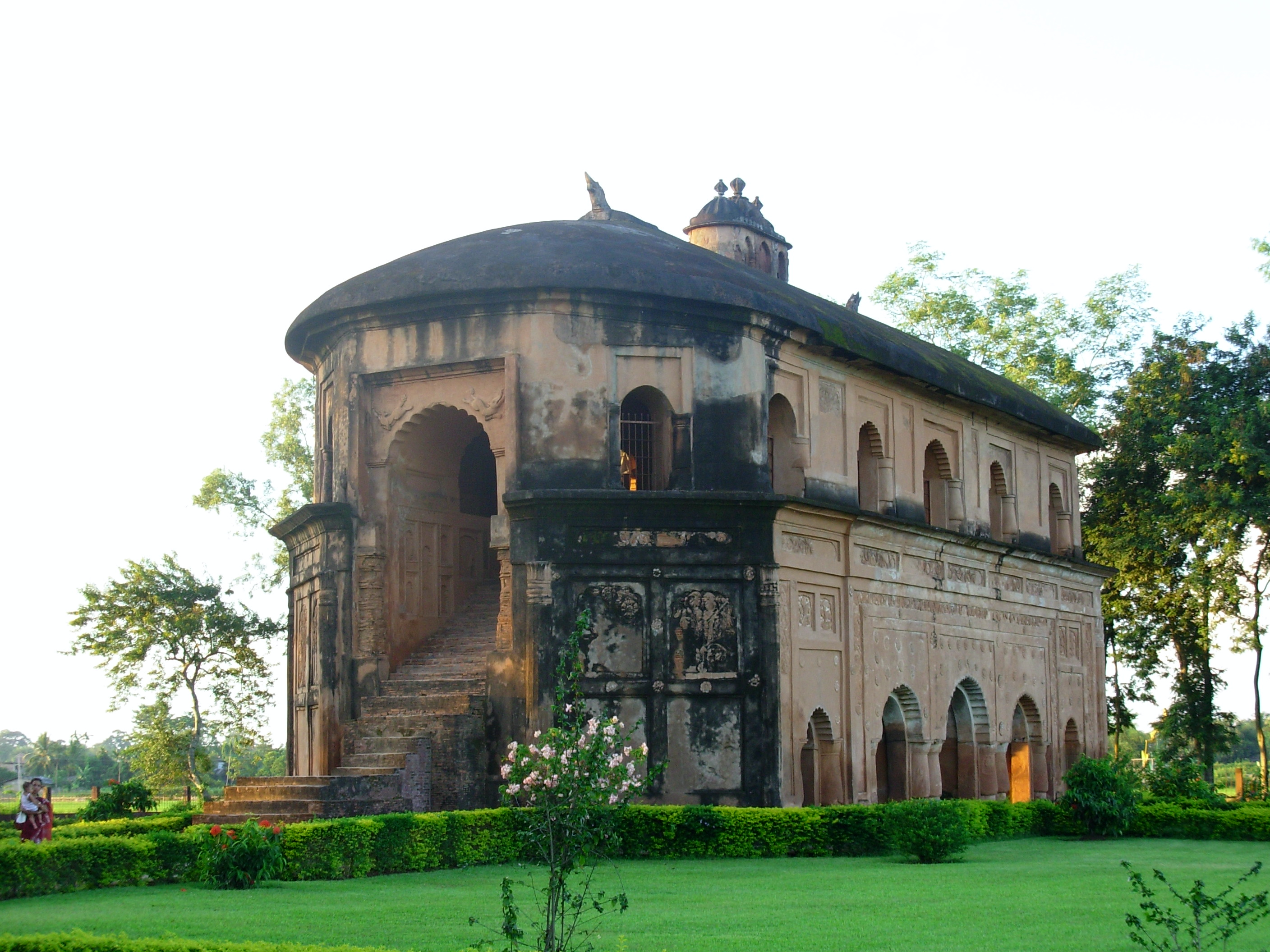
Facade of Rang Ghar

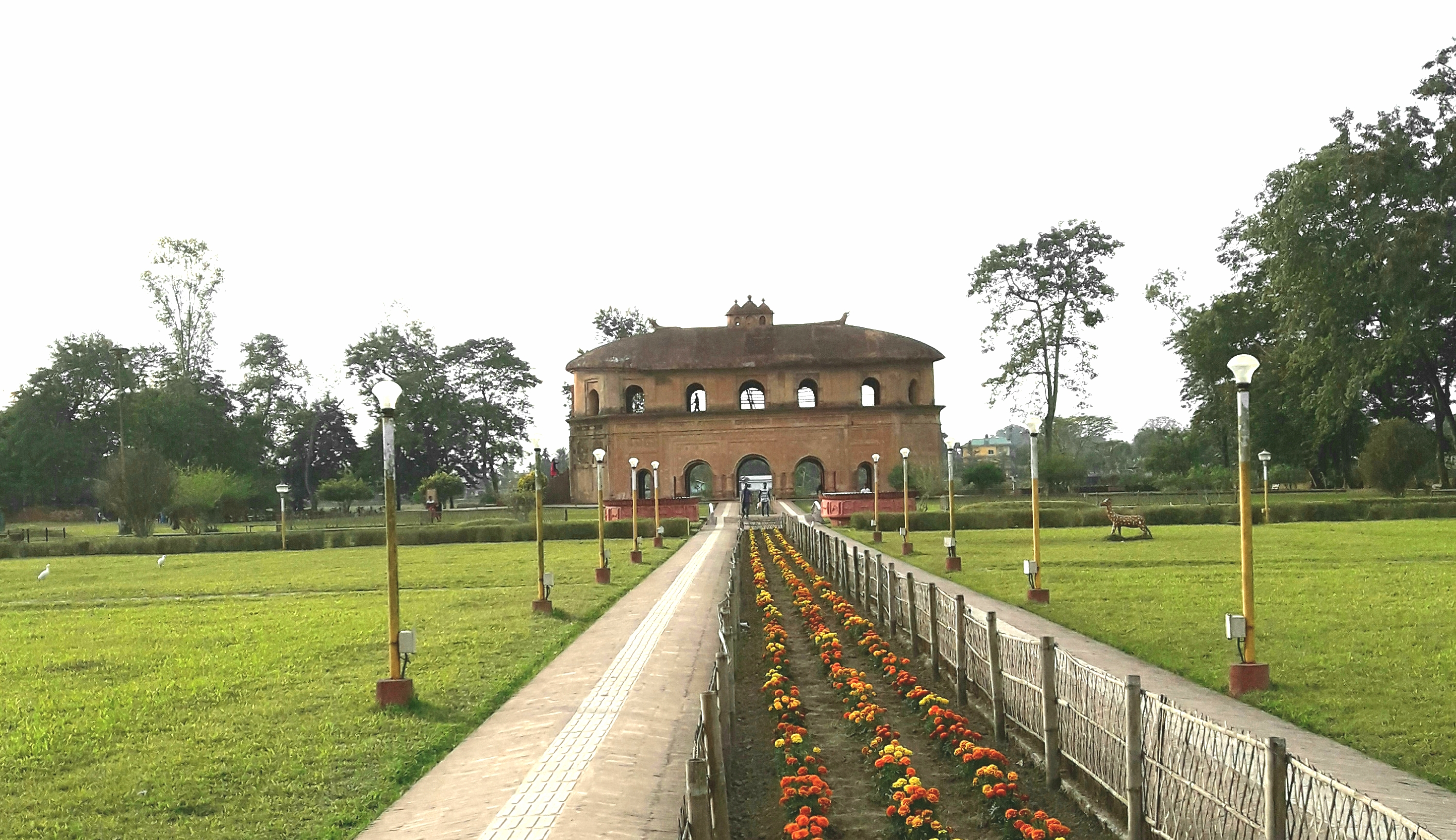
Rang Ghar court

== See also ==
- Ahom Dynasty
- Kareng Ghar, Garhgaon
- Talatal Ghar, Sivasagar
- Sivasagar district
