= Dikhow River =

River in India

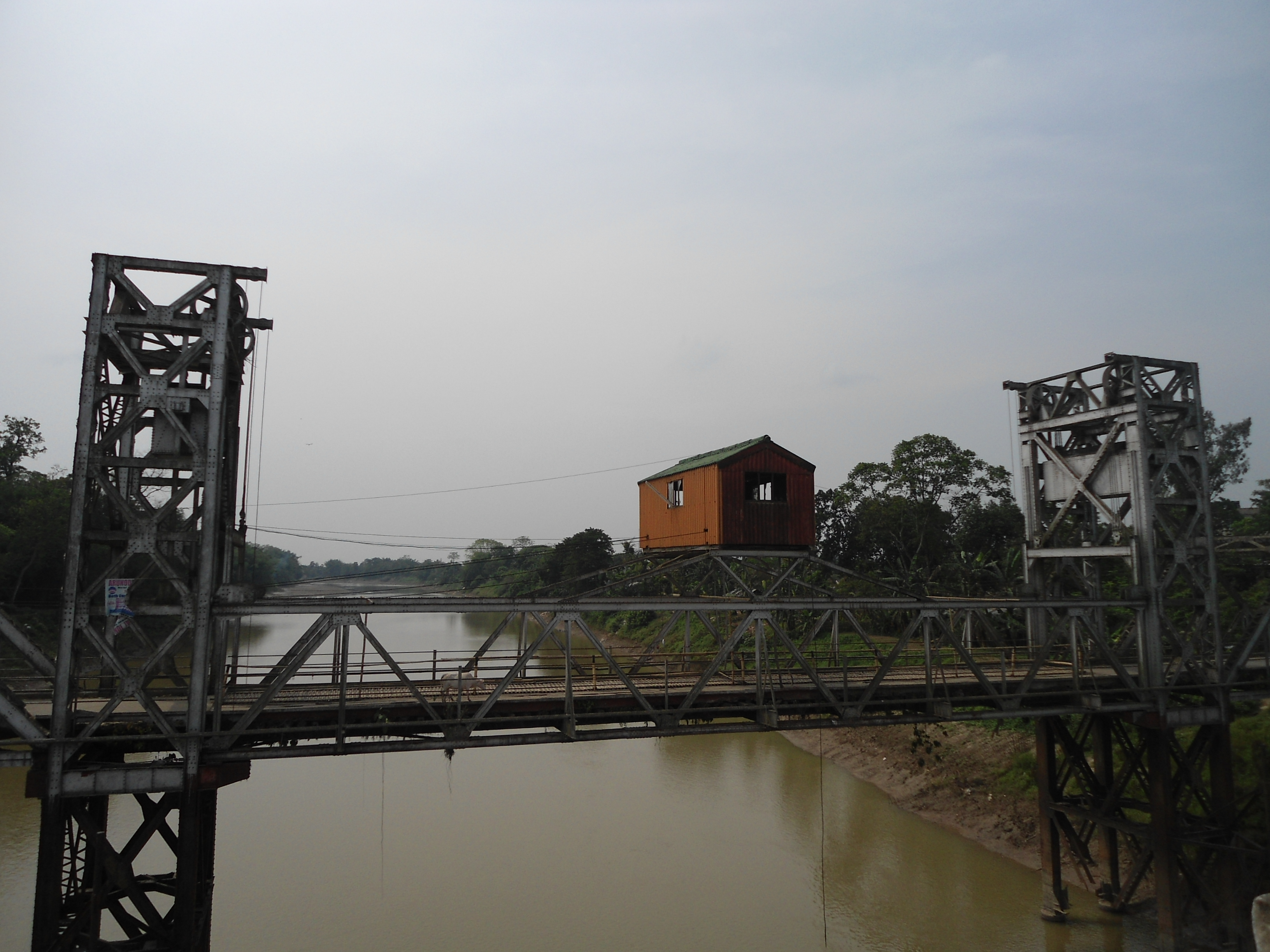
- Old Dikhow Bridge in Sivasagar which was built by the British in 1935

- Location within Assam Location within India

Location
- State: Assam, Nagaland
- Districts: Sivasagar

Physical characteristics
- Source: Longleng
  - location: Zunheboto district, Nagaland
  - coordinates: 26°44′45.7″N 94°48′24.8″E
- Mouth: Brahmaputra River
  - location: Dikhowmukh, Sivasagar district, Assam
  - coordinates: 27°00′00.2″N 94°27′52.8″E

Basin features
- Progression: Dikhow River- Brahmaputra River

The Dikhow River is a left tributary of the Brahmaputra River in the Indian state of Assam. It rises in the Zunheboto district in Nagaland, flows through the Sivasagar district of Assam and joins the Brahmaputra at Dikhowmukh.

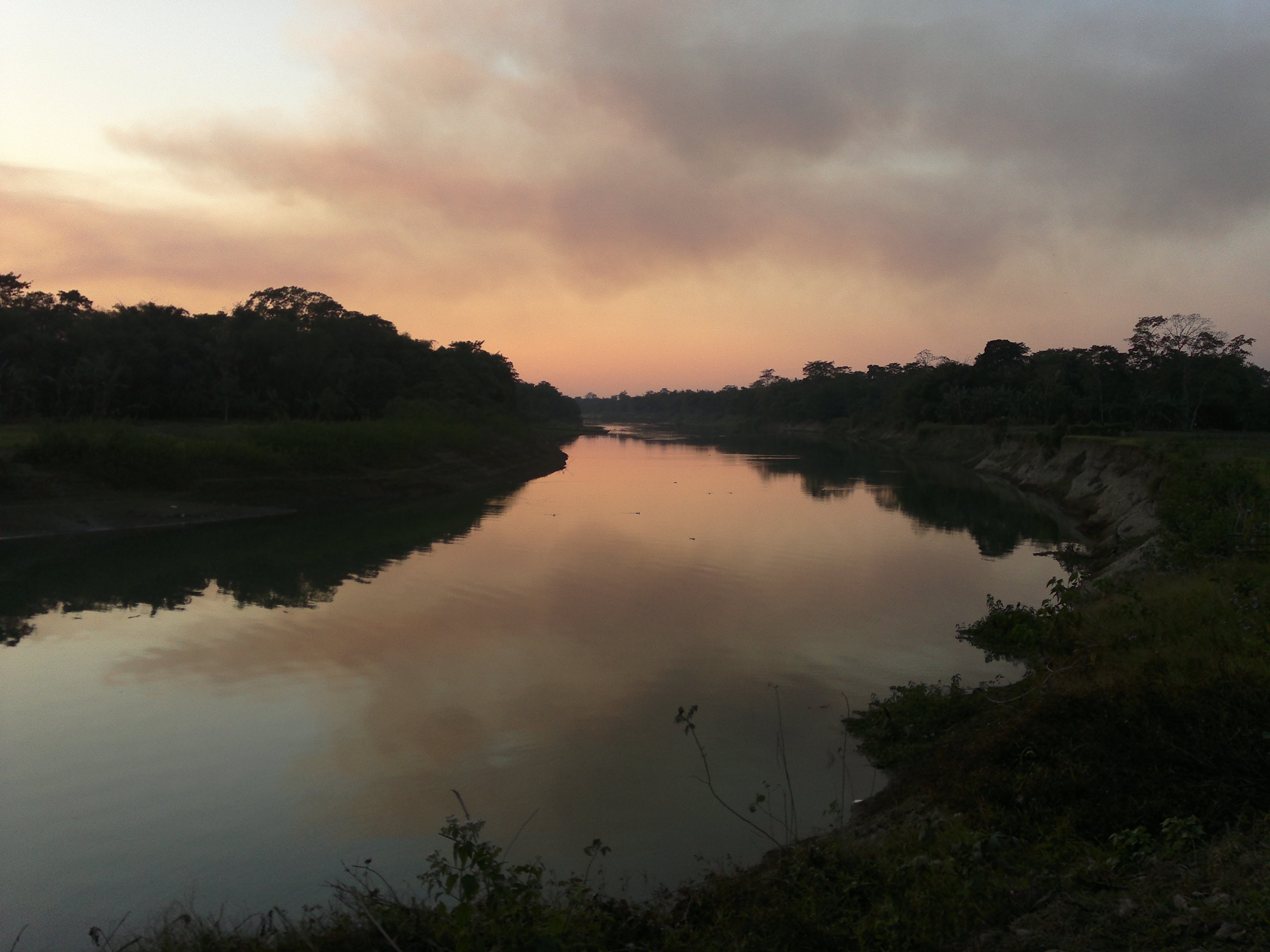
Dikhow river near Dikhowmukh
