= Ahom expedition to Manipur =

18th-century expedition

Date	1765 and 1767
Location	From present-day Nagaland to Manipur
Result	Ahom-Manipuri alliance victory

Belligerents
Ahom Kingdom; Manipur Kingdom	Konbaung dynasty

Commanders and leaders
Rajeswar Singha; Bhagya Chandra or Jai Singh; Harnath Senapati Phukan (Supreme commander during the first expedition); Khangia Phukan (Commander during the second expedition)	Moirang (Burmese puppet king)

Strength
40,000 (strength of Ahom force during the first expedition); 30,000 (strength of Ahom force during the second expedition)	Unknown

Ahom expeditions to Manipur was an 18th-century expeditions sent out in Manipur in 1765 and 1767 at the request of Bhagya Chandra or Jai Singh to the Ahom king Rajeswar Singha to wrest the Burmese occupation from Manipur. This resulted in Ahom-Manipur alliance victory, and the Manipuri throne was recovered to Jai Singh

== Background ==
In 1758, Alaungpaya the founder of Konbaung dynasty undertook the conquest of Manipur. Jai Singh the Manipuri king was unable to resist the aggression of Burmese and had to lose a portion of his country to the Burmese, and sought his shelter in Cachar erstwhile Kachari Kingdom. Thus, Jai Singh entered into a negotiation with the British in 1762. British agreed to help him in recovering his kingdom and sent a contingent under Henry Verelst, but was recalled when it reached Khaspur (capital of Dimasa kingdom), as it was calculated by the British that an engagement with Burmese would create fresh troubles for the British Indian Empire. Frustrated, he made an urgent appeal to the Ahom king to help to drive out the Burmese through an ambassador from the Kachari court. After consulting with the nobles, Jai Singh was given permission to come to the Ahom capital at Rangpur. Jai Singh came in the company of the Kachari king appeared personally before the Ahom king Rajeswar Singha, and appealed for help. Rajeswar Singha agreed to despatch an expeditionary force to drive out the Burmese invaders from his country, accordingly a contingent of 40,000 soldiers was organized under the command of Harnath Senapati Phukan (supreme commander) to be sent to Manipur.

== Manipur expedition ==
=== Lata Kata Ran ===
Many nobles who were asked to take the charge of the expedition declined on the pretext of illness. Those properties were confisticated and punished. Finally, at last, the grandson of Rangachilla Duara Borphukan, Harnath Majinder Bhitarual Barua was made the commander of the expeditionary force. He was made the Senapati Phukan or the supreme commander and ordered to march to Manipur through jungles over the Charaideo hill. Jai Singh undertook the responsibility to guide the force through a short way across the hills. The troops then advanced through the dense forest confounded the way and the Manipuri Raja couldn't show the direction. The whole force was put into extreme hardship. They continued their advance by making up a route but the process was extremely slow. As the rations of food were exhausted in the meantime, many perished of starvation, others of diseases, snake bites, spider bites, and by frequent clashes with Nagas. The state of the force was reported to the Ahom king, who recalled the whole force whose strength was greatly reduced to 1/3. Harnath Senapati Phukan was charged of the inability to take action against the Nagas and the loss of numerous provisions, but Harnath gave a convincing reply that Manipuri Raja took undertook the responsibility of guiding across a short way but failed and the loss was not due the fear of Nagas. As this expedition involved fighting against the natives and clearing forest full of creepers it is popularly called Lata-Kata-Ran (a struggle to clear the creepers).

=== Second Expedition ===
The Ahom king sent another fresh force of 30,000 soldiers under Khangia Phukan, son of Bakatial Borbarua, were despatched to Manipur in 1767. Proceeded to Manipur with Jai Singh through Raha route and Kachari country. The main force was halted at Raha and a force consisting of 10,000 soldiers accompanied Jai Singh proceeded far as Merap river and where forts were constructed and a naga levy was raised. At the news of advance of Ahom army the Burmese puppet fled away. Thus, Bhagya Chandra or Jai Singh was crowned again to the Manipuri throne again.

== Aftermath ==
Jai Singh as a token of gratitude gave his daughter Kuranganayani and sent many valuable presents. Many Manipuris who accompanied Kuranganayani, were settled at Dichai and a mart called Magalughat was set up. Kuranganayani further solidified the relations between Ahom and Meiteis for her part in restoration of Lakshmi Singha reign during Moamoria rebellion. Jai Singh who was forever grateful for the Ahom king's help fought and provided service during the Moamoria rebellion.

== See also ==
- Ahom Dynasty
- Ahom kingdom
- Manipur Kingdom
- Konbaung dynasty
- Ching-Thang Khomba
- Rajeswar Singha
- Kuranganayani
