= Ahom kingdom =

Kingdom in Assam, India (1228–1826)

Coordinates: 26°55′59″N 94°44′53″E

Ahom kingdom Kingdom of Assam
- 1228–1826
- Ngi-ngao-kham(Royal insignia)

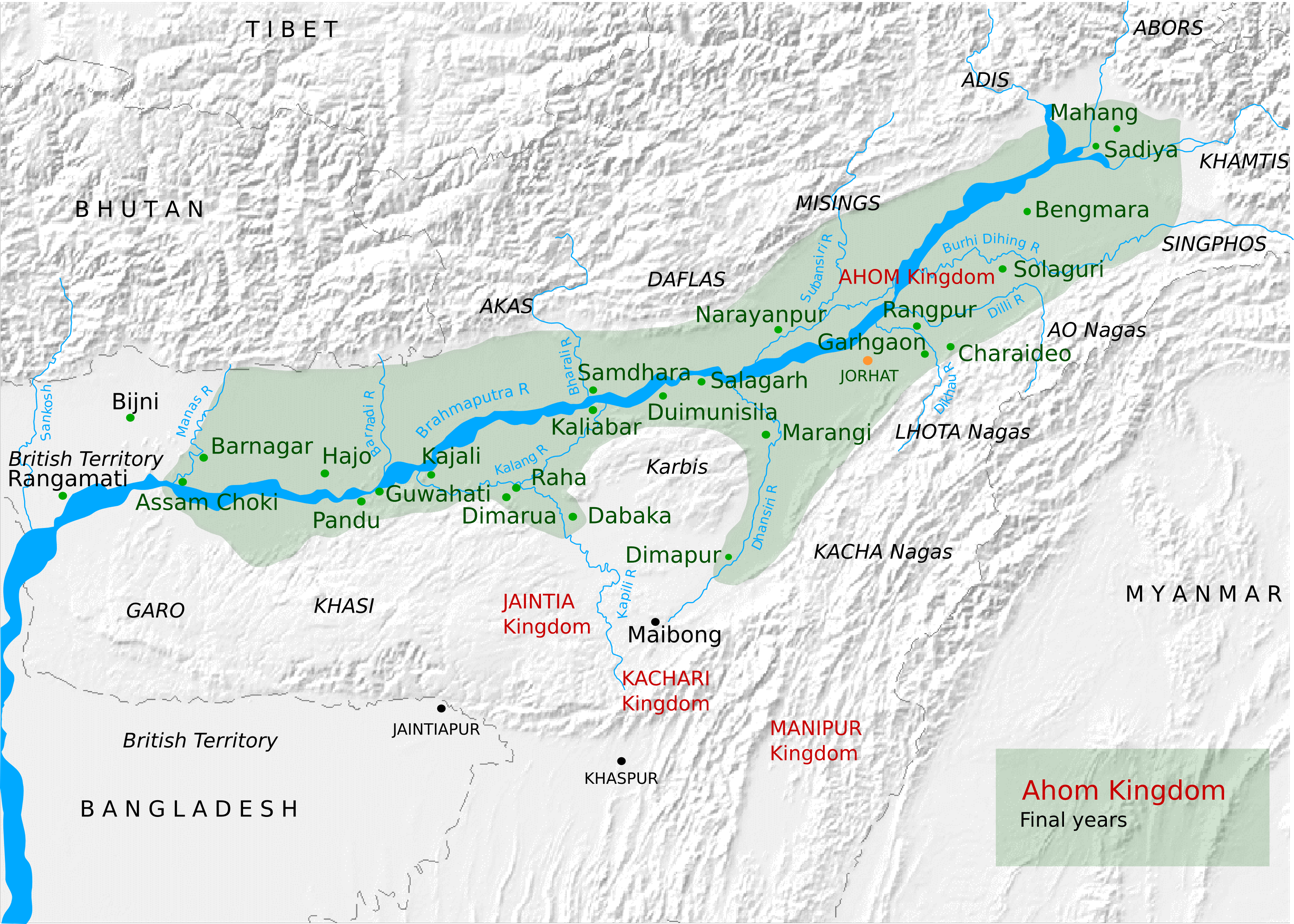
- The Ahom kingdom, 1826.
- Status: Kingdom
- Capital: Charaideo (1253–1397); Charagua (1397–?); Bakata; Garhgaon (1540–1707); Rangpur (1707–1794); Jorhat (1794–1826)
- Common languages: Assamese (lingua franca, court language); Sanskrit (literary language); Ahom (court language, dynastic language) And other native languages
- Religion: Ahom religion (1228–1648) (Note: Till King Sutamla officially converted to Hinduism.); Hinduism (1648–1826); Ekasarana Dharma; Shaktism; Shaivism; Tribal religions
- Demonym: Ahom • Assamese
- Government: Bureaucratic feudalism and Aristocratic monarchy
- Chao Pha, Swargadeo
  - 1228–1268: Sukapha
  - 1497–1539: Suhungmung
  - 1603–1641: Pratap Singha
  - 1696–1714: Rudra Singha
  - 1833–1838: Purandar Singha
- Historical era: Middle Age and Colonial Age
  - Established by Sukapha: 1228
  - Re-organization under King Suhungmung: 1497
  - Koch-Ahom conflicts: 1543–68
  - Ahom–Mughal Wars: 1615–1682
  - Moamaria rebellion: 1769
  - Burmese invasion of Assam: 1817
  - Treaty of Yandabo: 1826

Area
- 1826: 41,957.807 km^{2} (16,200.000 sq mi)

Population
  - 1711: 2,880,000
  - 1833: 2,500,000
- Currency: Ahom coinage
Preceded by	Succeeded by
Kamarupa Kingdom; Möng Mao	Konbaung dynasty; Colonial Assam
- Today part of: India; Myanmar

The Ahom kingdom (/ˈɑːhɔːm/; 1228–1826), also called the Kingdom of Assam, was a late medieval kingdom in the Brahmaputra Valley that existed from 1228 to 1826 and came to incorporate large parts of modern Assam. Established by Sukapha, a Tai prince from Möng Mao, it began as a small mueang in the upper reaches of the Brahmaputra based on wet-rice agriculture. The kingdom expanded under Suhungmung in the 16th century, and became multi-ethnic in character, accelerating a process of social change and ethnogenesis under the ruling Ahom dynasty. During the 17th century, the kingdom defeated multiple attempts by the Mughal Empire to expand into Northeast India. Central authority collapsed following the Moamoria rebellion in the late 18th century. Internal conflicts between dynastic claimants led to Burmese intervention, and the kingdom faced multiple Burmese invasions after 1817. British intervention led to the First Anglo-Burmese War, and the control of the kingdom passed into the hands of the East India Company through the Treaty of Yandabo in 1826.

The kingdom was largely multi-ethnic, with the ethnic Tai Ahom people constituting less than 10% of the population according to the 1872 and 1881 censuses of British India conducted in former Ahom territory. People from different ethnic groups became a part of the Ahom population due to a process known as Ahomisation. The identity of the Ahom people in the kingdom was fluid, with the king controlling who belonged to it and who did not. The Ahoms called their kingdom Mung Dun Shun Kham (Assamese: xunor-xophura; English: casket of gold) till 1401. The kingdom subsequently acquired the name Asom or Assam from the Ahom ruling class. The kingdom maintained close political ties with the nearby Tai (Shan) state of Möng Kawng till the end of its rule in the early 19th century.

== History ==
The Ahom kingdom was established in 1228 when Sukapha, a Tai prince, entered the Brahmaputra valley having crossed the Patkai mountain range from Möng Mao. Sukapha probably started his journey from his homeland with a small number, but he was supported and joined by other Tai chiefs and common followers along the way and entered Assam with approximately 9,000 persons. They arrived in Upper Assam, earlier the domain of the Kamarupa kingdom which had since lapsed into deteriorating conditions. His intention was not to conquer and raid but to permanently settle in fallow land and practice agriculture At the time of their arrival in the Brahmaputra valley, the Ahom practiced forms of Buddhism and the Ahom religion. As Hinduism gained influence in the kingdom during the reign of Suhungmung, the Ahom adapted by identifying their god Lengdon with Indra.

The Ahoms were primarily responsible for converting the undulating alluvial forest and marshy plains in upper Assam to flat rice fields able to hold plain water for rice cultivation via a network of embankments. The Tai had with them the basic political structures for state-building (mung), surplus producing technologies such as sedentary wet-rice cultivation and hydrology, a patriarchal social organisation based on clans (foid), and a literary form of their language. Whereas the earlier state formations (Kamarupa) borrowed political structures from North India that led to Indo-Aryan domination, the Ahom state formation provided an alternate model built on Southeast Asian political structures, and which provided the space for the development of a distinct political, social and cultural identity. The early kings of the Ahom dynasty claimed descent from Lengdon, the lord of heaven in the Ahom religion. The later Tungkhungia kings converted to Shaktism and the persecution of the shudra Mahantas and their laity that began during the reign of Siva Singha led to the Moamoria rebellion and ultimately to the end of the kingdom.

=== Early history (1228–1510) ===
Sukapha (r. 1228–1268) and his followers, after arriving in Assam, spent a couple of decades moving from place to place establishing colonies and finally settling down in Charaideo in 1253. The Ahoms began to call their domain Mung Dun Sun Kham ("country of golden gardens"). Sukapha established the offices of the Dangarias— the Burhagohain (Chao-Phrungmung) and the Borgohain (Chao-Thaonmung). In the 1280s, these two offices were given independent regions of control; partly hereditary and partly elected, the king and the two counsellors held each other in check and balance. These institutions of checks and balances held fast for six hundred years—in the 18th century John Peter Wade, a British officer, observed these unique institutions and novel system of government. Sukapha had instructed that events during his rule be chronicled, a practice sustained by his successors; and there emerged the institution of Buranji writing, a practice of historiography rare elsewhere in India. In the late medieval era, the Ahom kingdom was known to be a kaghazi raj (a kingdom with records) just as the Mughal Empire was.

At the time of their arrival in Assam, the Ahoms came with advanced technologies of rice cultivation, and it was their belief that they were divinely ordained to turn fallow land to agriculture and also to absorb stateless and shifting agriculturists to their own ways. The Ahom called non-Ahom who practiced shifting cultivation Kha, meaning "slave" or "culturally inferior foreigner". Kha could become part of Ahom culture by switching to wet-rice cultivation, and being ritually adopted into Ahom clans, in a process known as Ahomisation. The process of the Ahom assimilating neighboring ethnic groups was facilitated by similarities in religion between them and the Ahom. Sukapha befriended those among the Morans and Barahi who were willing to join him and killed those who opposed him. Many others were incorporated into Ahom clans. The Ahoms were aware of their smaller numbers, and avoided confrontations with larger groups. Ahomisation increased the Ahom numbers significantly. This process of Ahomisation was particularly significant till the 16th century when under Suhungmung, the kingdom made large territorial expansions at the cost of the Chutiya and the Kachari kingdoms.

At this stage the kingdom was still not fully sovereign. Sukapha sent his word of allegiance and tributes to Möng Mao, a practice that was continued by some of his successors till about the early 15th century when the power of Möng Mao faded to be replaced the power of Möng Kawng, at which point the Ahoms stopped the tributes. Though Sukapha had avoided the Namdang region, being mindful of the numerically small Ahom contingent, during the reign of his son Suteupha, the Kacharis withdrew from the region and the Ahoms expanded into it; but no further expansions of the Ahom domain occurred for the next two hundred years. The Ahom kingdom, for most of its history, had been closed and population movement closely monitored, though the kingdom did have relations with Chutia kingdom that turned into a conflict, and a marriage alliance with the Kamata kingdom. At the end of the 14th century, the nascent Ahom polity faced crises of succession, two regicides, and three interregnum periods when the kingdom was without a king.

Sudangpha Bamuni Konwar (r. 1397–1407), born and raised in a Brahmin household in Habung, was identified as a descendant of a past king and installed on the throne by the Burhagohain and Borgohain to end the period of crisis. He established Brahmin officers, advisors and communities near the capital and the Brahmin influence, though negligible, was felt for the first time. A number of rebellions erupted purportedly against this influence but Sudangpha was able to suppress them and solidify his rule. One of the rebels invited a military expedition from Mong Kwang (called Nara in the Buranjis, a successor state of Mong Mao to which the early Ahom kings used to send tribute) resulting in a clash in 1401—but Sudangpha defeated the expedition and concluded the conflict with a treaty that fixed the boundary between the two polities at the Patkai hills. This event was significant since it moved the Ahom polity from implicit subordination to explicit sovereignty, and this was accompanied by the transition of the name of the polity from Mung Dun Shun Kham to "Assam", possibly related to the names Shan/Shyam and Siam. Sudangpha established a new capital at Charagua, broke the clan allegiances that had earlier held the Ahom polity together, replacing it with political authority of the king, and introduced the tradition of the singarigharutha ceremony, the state coronation of the Ahom kings that symbolised royal Ahom sovereignty, authority and legitimacy.

Sudangpha settled Habung brahmins close his capital, settled the sons of his adopted Brahmin family in frontier areas, dismantled the tribal allegiances that held the polity together earlier and brought the Ahom kingdom very close to a full-fledged state.

The next hundred years saw the kingdom mostly suppressing rebellious Naga groups, but a conflict with the Dimasa kingdom in 1490 saw the Ahoms, not strong enough to take them on frontally, suing for peace. The Ahom royalty continuously improved their relationship with the Brahmans which enabled them to gain goodwill with the Indo-Aryanized tribal groups and consolidate power.

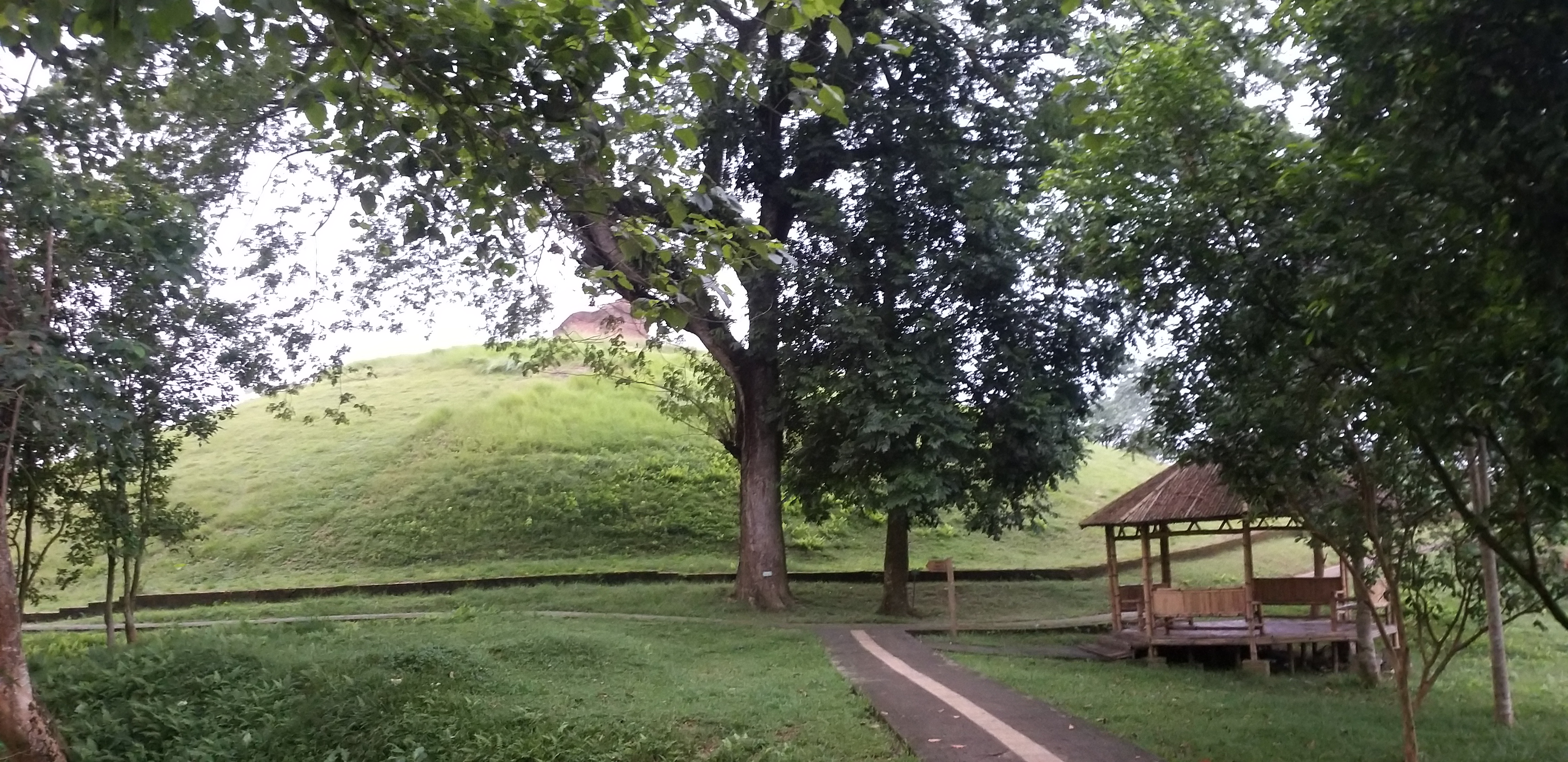
Charaideo Maidams – UNESCO World Heritage Site, Assam

=== Full state and expansion (1510–1609) ===
The Ahom kingdom transitioned into a full state rather dramatically in a short period during the reign of Suhungmung Dihingia Raja (r. 1497–1539). It began first with a consolidation of the militia in 1510, followed by an expansion into the region of Panbari at Habung (a Chutia dependency) in 1512 probably with the help of the descendants of the Habungia Brahmans settled during Sudangpha's time. A clash with the Hinduized Chutia kingdom began in 1513, followed by its annexation in 1523 and the kingdom's nobility, commanders, professional classes, warriors and technologies were absorbed into the Ahom kingdom. In 1527, the Baro-Bhuyans ruling in central Assam region of Rowta-Temoni were relocated to the north-bank of Upper-Assam and absorbed into the lower echelons of the growing state as scribes and warriors. It was this formation of the Ahom kingdom that met the aggression from Bengal under Turbak in 1532 and it was able to eliminate the aggressive leadership (with significant loss to itself) and pursue the retreating invaders to the Karatoya river. In 1536, after the series of contacts with the Kachari kingdom, the Ahom rule extended up to the Kolong River in Nagaon; and by the end of Suhungmung's reign, the size of the kingdom had effectively doubled.

These expansions created significant changes in the kingdom—the Assamese-speaking Hinduized subjects outnumbered the Ahoms themselves; and the absorption of the Chutia kingdom meant a wide range of artisan skills became available to it increasing the scope for division of labour. To provide legitimacy to the rule of the Ahom kings among the new subjects Suhungmung assumed the title Swarganarayana (Swargadeo), though nothing like the Rajputisation process occurred with the Ahoms. The nature of the kings institutional relationship to the ministers changed with the creation of a new position, the Borpatrogohain, named after a Chutia office; and the creation of the offices of Sadiyakhowa Gohain (frontier region acquired from the Chutia kingdom) and the Marangikhowa Gohain (territories acquired from the Kachari kingdom), both of which were reserved for the Borgohain and Burhagohain lineages. The traditional nobles (Chao) now aligned with the Brahmin literati and an expanded ruling class developed. And when the Ahoms under Ton Kham Borgohain pursued the invaders and reached the Karatoya river they began to see themselves as the rightful heir of the erstwhile Kamarupa kingdom.

=== Maturing state (1609–1682) ===
The Ahom kingdom became more broad-based and took many features of its mature form under Pratap Singha (r. 1603–1641), primarily to meet the sustained attacks from the Mughals. The Paik system was reorganized in 1609 under the professional khel system, replacing the kinship-based phoid system; and paiks could be permanently alienated to non-royal institutions via royal grants. Under the same king, the offices of the Borphukan (viceroy of territories acquired from the Koches and the Mughals), and the Borbarua (the "secretary" of the royal government) were established to increase the number of Patra Mantris to five, along with other smaller offices. The practices of using Brahmins solely for diplomatic missions, the Ahom kings adopting a Hindu name in addition to their Ahom names, and patronising Hindu establishments began with Pratap Singha, though formal initiation of the Ahom kings into Hinduism did not occur till 1648. The Assamese language entered the Ahom court for the first time and briefly coexisted with and eventually replaced the Ahom language.

==== Koch relations ====
After the division of the Koch kingdom between two branches of the Koch dynasty in 1581, the Ahoms allied with their immediate western neighbor, the Koch Hajo branch, from 1603 to prop them as a buffer against the Mughals who had extended their rule to Bengal by 1576. The collapse of the Koch Hajo power in 1614 resulted in the Mughals coming to power up to the Barnadi River. The Mughals attempted further ingress to the east in 1616 with the Battle of Samdhara which marked the beginning of the Ahom–Mughal conflicts which lasted the till 1682 in the Battle of Itakhuli, when the Ahoms were able to push the Mughals back to the west of the Manas River permanently.

==== Mughal relations ====
In 1657, owing to the 'War of succession' among the sons of Shah Jahan, Ahom king Jayadhwaj Singha extended his authority, occupied Kamrup, preventing the other rebellious Koch king Pran Narayan from securing his footing. He extended his authority over the whole of western Assam. He brought under his domain the whole Brahmaputra Valley, from Sadiya in the east and Sherpur on the south. Thus, the Ahom state attained its greatest territorial extent.

In 1662, Aurangzeb launched an invasion under his chief lieutenant Mir Jumla II, and the Mughals occupied the capital, Garhgaon. After the Battle of Saraighat, the Ahoms not only fended off the Mughal invasion but extended their boundaries west up to the Manas River. The western border was fixed at the Manas river after the Battle of Itakhuli, which remained the same till then annexation by the British.

=== Tungkhungia regime (1682–1826) ===
Gadadhar Singha (r. 1682–1696) established the Tungkhungia rule in Assam, which remained in power till the end of the kingdom. In 1682, the Mughals were defeated in the Battle of Itakhul, and the Manas river was fixed as the western boundary of the kingdom. Gadadhar Singha came in conflict with the Vaisnava Satras who began commencing immense power and influence over the state and people, and started a widespread persecution of the Vaisnavites.

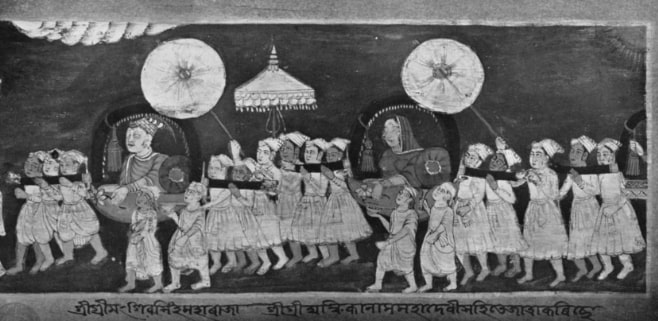
King Siva Singha and Bar–Raja Ambika riding litter

Rudra Singha alias Sukhrungpha (r. 1696–1714) subdued the kingdoms of Dimasa and Jaintia. He had made extensive preparations to extend the boundary westward, and attempted to make a confederacy of Hindu kings of eastern India against the Mughals. He died before he could execute his plans in 1714. Rudra Singha had reinstated the Vaisnava Satras. He himself had become a disciple of the Auniati Gosain (the most influential Brahmana Sattradhikar), but later in his life he became inclined towards Shaktism, considering it to be more suitable for a monarch. He invited a famous Sakta Brahmana from Bengal named Krishnaram Bhattacharya, better known as Parvatiya Gosain, to his court. From his deathbed he expressed his will that all five of his sons become kings and advised them to become disciples of Parvatiya Gosain.

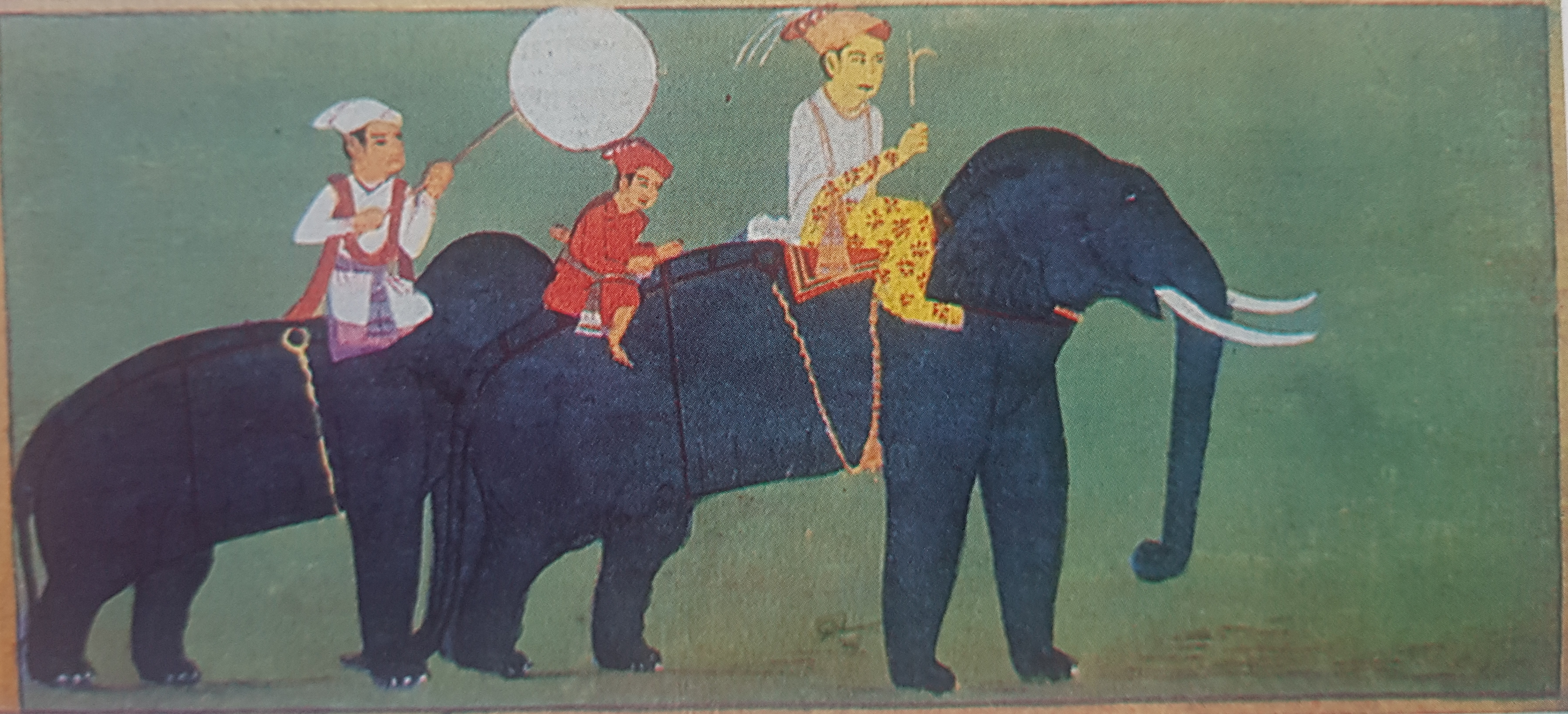
Ahom King Siva Singha riding elephant with attendants

Siva Singha alias Sutanpha (r. 1714–1744), did not carry out his father's plan to invade Bengal. He became a disciple of Parvatiya Gosain and granted him a residence at Kamakhya Temple in the Nilachal hills with extensive land grants and paiks. In 1722 it was predicted by the astrologers that his reign would soon come to a end owing to the influence of a chatra–bhanga–yoga, a planetary junction. Therefore, he transferred the royal umbrella and throne to his wife Phuleshwari who was given the title of 'Bar–Raja' on the advice of Pravatiya Gosain. Phuleswari promoted Shaktism and Durga worship at the expense of Vaishnavism. Her insistence that the Shudra Mahantas participate in the Durga Puja festival cause the Maymara Mahanta to resolve to seize political power. After the death of Phuleswari, two other wives of Siva Singha were set on the position of 'Bar–Raja', namely Ambika and Sarbeswari. Siva Singha's reign was peaceful except for an expedition sent against the Daflas. He had ordered the construction of many temples and made numerous grants to religious sites and brahmanas. He died in 1744, and his younger brother Pramatta Singha was set up on the throne, setting aside the claims of Siva Singha's son.

Pramatta Singha alias Sunenpha (r. 1744–1751) erected the Rang Ghar and built the Sukreswar and Rudreswar temples in North–Guwahati. During his reign, Kirti Chandra Borbarua gained political influence. In 1744, he received an ambassador from the king of Twipra. He died in 1751.

Rajeswar Singha alias Surempha (r. 1751–1759) was put on the throne by Kirti Chandra Borbarua, setting aside the claims of seniority of his elder brother Barjana Gohain. Rajeswar Singha erected the most number of temples among the Ahom Kings. He was an orthodox Hindu and became a disciple of Nati–Gosain, a relative of Pravatiya Gosain. In 1765, he sent an expedition to Manipur, whose king Jay Singha made an appeal to the Ahom king to recover his country from Burmese occupation. The first expeditionary force had to be sent through the Naga Hills. In 1767 another force was despatched through Raha. The second expedition achieved its objective of recovering Manipur. Kirti Chandra Borbarua, who was the most influential noble in the Ahom court, had ordered the burning of Buranjis. Rajeswar Singha was succeeded by his younger brother Lakshmi Singha alias Sunyeopha (r. 1769–1780).

=== Moamaria rebellions ===
Instead of having a standing army, adult male commoners in the Ahom kingdom were obliged to serve as soldiers for three months a year under the paik system. This obligation could be escaped by avoiding census registration, joining a Vaishnava monastery, or payment to one's commanding officer. In response to the popularity of avoiding paik service, Rajeswar Singha increased the term of service to four months, which made the system even less popular.

This led to the Moamoria rebellion, in which the Moamoria, Neo-Vaishnava Ekasarana Dharma adherents, organized against the ruling dynasty and Brahman elites. The Moamoria preached an egalitarian messages, and followers from among many castes and ethnic groups, particularly the Moran, Chutia, and Kachari people, who collectively made up much of the Ahom Army. The Mayamara had no relationship with the Brahmin priests, and worshipped by Harinama, communal prayer. The Mayamara Mahanta refused patronage from the Ahom court.

During the reign of Lakshmi Singha, a tribal chief of the Moamoria was imprisoned for alleged negligence in supplying elephants in tribute to the king. In November 1769, the Moran people revolted, inspiring others to join them along their march to the capital. Rangpur and Garhgaon were captured by rebels, as was Lakshmi Singha. A non-Ahom commoner, Ramakanta, was put on the throne. Many ministers and officers were also replaced by non-Ahom. Lakshmi Singha was restored to the throne on 11 April, 1770, but political instability continued.

The Moamoria launched another attack on Rangpur and Garhgoan in April 1783, which failed and was followed by massacres of Moamoria across the kingdom. A third rebellion in 1785 eventually led Gaurinath Singha to flee Rangpur in January 1788, for Guwahati. Bharat Singha was placed on the throne in his place. Rebel activity was mostly confined to eastern Assam, and did not form a unified new state, with many cities occupied and ruled by different chiefs. Royalists fled to western Assam, with the sudden population influx leading to a grain shortage in 1789. This led to further popular discontent among chiefs, peasants, and clergy in western Assam.

In November 1789, Gaurinath Singha attempted to recruit burkundaz mercenaries from East India Company territories to bolster his forces. Prince Krishnanaryan, whose father Hangsanaryam had been executed by royal troops for conspiring against the kingdom with Haradatta Choudhury, intercepted a group of mercenaries who were on their way to assist Gaurinath Singha, and convinced the to instead join his cause. Krishnanaryan and Haradatta then agreed to join forces to free Darrang and Kamarupa from Ahom rule. The Ahom kingdom enlisted the help of the Manipur, who sent 4,000 infantry and a cavalry unit, with Bhagya Chandra leading them in an unsuccessful attack on rebel-held Rangpur. After Charles Cornwallis approved East India Company intervention, 360 sepoys led by Captain Welsh sailed to Guwahati from Krishnanaryan on 16 November 1792, meeting Gaurinath Singha along the way. Guwahati was retaken on 25 November with no resistance. Krishnanaryan and Haradatta fled to Bhutan.

The Moamaria chief Bharat Singh was killed in action around 1800. A conspiracy led by Panimuwa in 1803 was unsuccessful. Prime minister Purnananda Burhagohain placed Chandrakanta Singha on the throne after his brother Kamaleswar Singha died on 17 January 1811. Chandrakanta Singha appealed to Badan Chandra Borphukan help him depose Purnananda. Badan Chandra fled to Calcutta in 1815 to ask the East India Company to assist in overthrowing Purnananda. After the Company refused, he made the same appeal to the Burmese king, who sent a large army to Assam in 1816, with the Burmese force overcoming Assamese resistance in 1817. Purnanada comitted suicide following this defeat.

The Burmese occupied Jorhat and restored Badan Chandra to his office, leaving in April 1817. Burmese forces returned in 1819 to restore Chandrakanta Singha to the throne after he was replaced briefly by Purandar Singha. After Chandrakantam Singha relinquished his role as a nominal ruler under Burmese administration, Burmese commanders themselves ruled Assam from 1819 to 1824. Burmese rule was brought to an end by British intervention, with Assam coming under British control in 1826.

== Economy ==
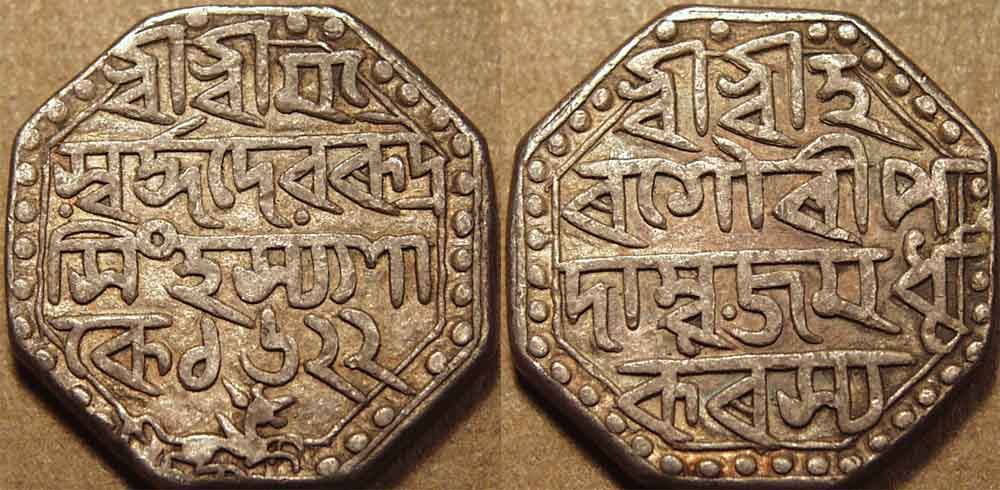
Silver rupee of Rudra Singha

=== Trade ===
Trade was carried on usually through barter and use of circulation of money was limited. According to Shihabududdin Tailash, currency in the Ahom kingdom consisted of cowries, rupees and gold coins. With the increase of external trade since the reign of Rudra Singha, there was a corresponding increase in the circulation of money. Inscriptions dating from the reign of Siva Singha give the price of commodities like rice, ghee, oil, pulses, goat, and pigeon in connection with worship in different temples of the kingdom.

==== Trade with Tibet ====
Due to trade with Tibet, a coin of Jayadhwaj Singha carries a single Chinese character on each side reading Zang Bao. This had been translated as 'treasury of your honour'. Nicholas Rodhes read the inscription as 'Currency of Tibet', Also these two characters were used by the Chinese in Lhasa between 1792 and 1836 with the meaning 'Tibetan currency. Furthermore, there was a significant contact between China and Tibet in the mid-seventeen century, so it is not unlikely that the Assamese would have thought have thought that a Chinese character was an appropriate for Assamese-Tibetan trade coin. This piece evidently was an attempt by Jayadhwaj Singha to facilitate trade with Chinese knowing person coming from the direction of Tibet. Rudra Singha established an extensive trade with Tibet and encouraged trade with other nations, although he strictly limited the extent to which foreigners were allowed into the country. Some of the coins of his reign were struck with the silver earned from these trading activities.

== Geography ==
In extent the kingdom's length was about 500 miles (800 km) and with an average breadth of 60 miles (96 km). The kingdom can be divided into three major regions: the north bank (Uttarkul), the south bank (Dakhinkul), and the island of Majuli. The north bank (Uttarkul) was more populated and fertile, but the Ahom kings set up their capital on the south bank (Dakinkul) because it had more inaccessible strongholds and defensible central places.

Territorial growth of the Ahom kingdom

== Demographics ==
=== Population ===
King Pratap Singha systematised the population distribution and settlement of villages. The census of the adult male population of the state was taken very strictly so that every working man would be registered for the state service. The census was recorded in registers called paikar piyalar kakat.

Population growth from 1500 to 1770 A.D. is evident by the founding of new towns, adoption of labour-intensive farming methods, and migration to the kingdom. During the Moamoria rebellion (1769–1805) more than half of the population died. During the Burmese regime, the Burmese depredations (1817–1825) further reduced the population by one third. It shows that only 700,000 to 800,000 people remained, at the time of British annexation.

The following table estimates the population composition of classes, during the reign of king Rajeswar Singha (1751–1769). According to the population estimates computed by Gunabhiram Barua.

Aristocracy	Slaves/Bondsmen	Chamua	Karni Paik	Total Population
1%	9%	25%	65%	100%
24,000	2,16,000	6,00,000	15,60,000	24,00,000

Year wise estimated population of medieval Assam
Year	Estimated population by Guha (1978)	Estimated population by Bhuyan (1949)	Estimated population by NPB	Estimated population by Dutt (1958)
1615	16,80,000		1,12,48,286	
1620	24,40,000			
1669	16,00,000			
1711	28,80,000			
1750	30,00,000+			
1765		24,00,000		
1833				2,50,000

=== Urbanization ===
Only a small percentage of the population lived in towns. Some important towns of the Ahom kingdom were Rangpur, Garhgoan, Guwahati and Hajo. The capital city of Rangpur, was found to be 20 miles (32.18 km) in extent and densely populated by Capt. Welsh in 1794. The population, however, never exceeded 10,000.

== Administration ==
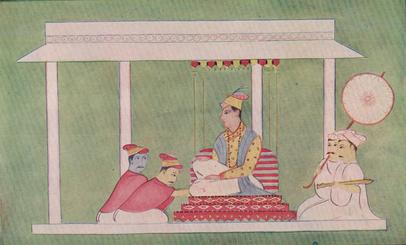
Ahom king Rudra Singha receiving the kings of the Dimasa and the Jaintia kingdoms in his court.

=== Swargadeo and Patra Mantris ===
The Ahom kingdom was ruled by a king, called Swargadeo (Ahom language: Chao-Pha), who had to be a descendant of the first king Sukapha. Succession was generally by primogeniture but occasionally the great Gohains (Dangarias) could elect another descendant of Sukapha from a different line or even depose an enthroned one.

=== Dangarias ===
Sukapha had two great Gohains to aid him in administration: Burhagohain and the Borgohain. In the 1280s, they were given independent territories, they were veritable sovereigns in their given territories called bilat or rajya. The Burhagohain's territory was between Sadiya and Gerelua River in the north bank of the Brahmaputra River and the Borgohain's territory was to the west up to the Burai River. They were given total command over the paiks that they controlled. These positions were generally filled from specific families. Princes who were eligible for the position of Swargadeo were not considered for these positions and vice versa. In the 1527, Suhungmung added a third Gohain, the Borpatrogohain. The Borpatrogohain's territory was located between the territories of the other two Gohains.

=== Royal officers ===
Pratap Singha added two offices, Borbarua and Borphukan, that were directly under the king. The Borbarua, who acted as the military as well as the judicial head, was in command of the region east of Kaliabor not under the command of the Dangarias. He could use only a section of the paiks at his command for his personal use (as opposed to the Dangariyas), the rest rendering service to the Ahom state. The Borphukan was in military and civil command over the region west of Kaliabor, and acted as the Swargadeo's viceroy in the west. Borbaruas were mostly from different Moran, Kachari, Chiring and Khamti communities, while the Borphukan of lower Assam was appointed from the Chutia community.

=== Patra Mantris ===
The five positions constituted the Patra Mantris (Council of Ministers). From the time of Supimpha (1492–1497), one of the Patra Mantris was made the Rajmantri (Prime Minister, also Borpatro; Ahom language: Shenglung) who enjoyed additional powers and the service of a thousand additional paiks from the Jakaichuk village.

=== Other officials ===
The Borbarua and the Borphukan had military and judicial responsibilities, and they were aided by two separate councils (chorā) of Phukans. Six of them formed the council of the Borbarua with each having his separate duties. The Naubaicha Phukan, who had an allotment of thousand men managed the royal boats, the Bhitarual Phukan, the Na Phukan, the Dihingia Phukan, the Deka Phukan, and the Neog Phukan formed the council of Phukan. The Borphukan also had a similar council of six subordinate Phukans whom he was bound to consult in all matters of importance. This council included Pani Phukan, who commanded six thousand paiks, Deka Phukan who commanded four thousand paiks, the Dihingia Phukan, Nek Phukan and two Chutiya Phukans.

Baruas were deputies of phukans, or heads of departments which lacked a phukan.

Other officials included twelve Rajkhowas, and a number of Katakis, Kakatis, and Dolais. The Rajkhowas were governors of given territories and commanders of three thousand paiks. They were the arbitrator who settled local disputes and supervised public works. The Katakis were envoys who dealt with foreign countries and hill tribes. The Kakatis were writers of official documents. The Dolois or Dalais were astrologers, who determined auspicious time and dates for any important event and undertaking.

=== Governors ===
Members of the royal families ruled certain areas, and they were called Raja.

- Charing Raja, the heir apparent to the Swargadeo, administered the tracts around Joypur on the right bank of the Burhidihing river.
- Tipam Raja is the second in line.
- Namrup Raja is the third in line

Members of the royal families who occupy lower positions are given regions called mels, and were called meldangia or melkhowa raja. Meldangia Gohains were princes of an even lesser grade, of which there were two: Majumelia Gohain and Sarumelia Gohain.

Royal ladies were given individual mels, and by the time of Rajeshwar Singha, there were twelve of them. The most important of these was the Raidangia mel given to the chief queen.

Forward governors, who were military commanders, ruled and administered forward territories. The officers were usually filled from the families that were eligible for the three great Gohains.

- Sadiya Khowa Gohain based in Sadiya, administered the Sadiya region that was acquired after the conquest of the Chutia kingdom in 1524.
- Marangi khowa Gohain administered the region that was contiguous to the Naga groups west of the Dhansiri; acquired from the Kachari kingdom in 1526.
- Solal Gohain administered a great part of Nagaon and a portion of Chariduar after the headquarters of the Borphukan was transferred to Gauhati.
- Kajalimukhiya Gohain served under the Borphukan, administered Kajalimukh and maintained relations with Jaintia and Dimarua.
- Khamjangia Gohain administered the region of Khamjang (part of Naga hills).
- Banrukia Gohain administered the region of Banruk (part of Sibsagar district).
- Tungkhungia Gohain administered the region of Tingkhong.
- Banlungia Gohain administered the region of Banlung (Dhemaji) that was acquired after the conquest of the Chutia kingdom in 1524.
- Bhatialia Gohain administered the region of Habung acquired from the Chutia kingdom in 1524. Later Borpatrogohain was created in its place.
- Dihingia Gohain administered the region of Mungklang (Dihing) that was acquired after the conquest of the Chutiya kingdom in 1524.
- Kaliaboria Gohain administered the region of Kaliabor.
- Jagiyal Gohain served under Borbarua, administered Jagi at Nagoan and maintained relations with seven tribal chiefs, called Sat Raja.
- Mohongia Gohain and Mohongor Gohain based in the salt mines of Sadiya and Mohong (Naga hills) conquered from Chutia kingdom and Nagas.

Lesser governors were called Rajkhowas, and some of them were:

- Bacha
- Darrang
- Solaguri
- Abhaypur
- Tapakuchi

=== Judicial administration ===
In civil matters, Hindu laws were generally followed, while the criminal law was characterized by sternness and comparative harshness, where the general principle was that of an eye for an eye and a tooth for a tooth, and the culprit was punished with precisely the same injury as that inflicted by him on the complainant. The Borborua and the Borphukan were the chief judicial authorities in their respective provinces, and trials were conducted before them.

The punishments for crimes were generally harsh, with offenders punished by impaling, grinding between two cylinders, starving to death, slicing of the body into pieces, hoeing from head to foot, etc. Common punishments included the extraction of eyes and kneecaps, the slicing off of noses, beating with sticks, etc.

=== Vassals ===
The dependent kings or vassals were also called Raja. Except for the Raja of Rani, all paid an annual tribute. These Rajas were required to meet the needs for resources and paiks when the need arose, as during the time of war. There were in total 15 vassal states.

- Darrang Raja ruled the later-day Darrang district and were the descendants of Sundar Narayan, a great-grandson of Chilarai of the Koch dynasty.
- Rani
- Beltola ruled the tracts southwest of Guwahati and were the descendants of Gaj Narayan, a grandson of Chilarai of the Koch dynasty
- Luki
- Barduar
- Dimarua
- Gobha
- Neli

The other hill states which acknowledged the overlordship and nominal sovereignty of the Ahoms were the states of:

- Jaintia Kingdom
- Dimasa Kingdom
- Manipur Kingdom
- Khyrim

The states of Jaintia and Dimasa paid annual tributes to the Ahom king. The Ahom used the term thapita sanchita (established and preserved) to describe this tributary relationship.

=== Paik officials ===
The Ahom kingdom was dependent on the Paik system, a form of corvee labor, reorganized in 1608 by Momai Tamuli Barbarua. Every common subject was a paik, and four paiks formed a got. At any time of the year, one of the paiks in the got rendered direct service to the king, as the others in his got tended to his fields. The Paik system was administered by the Paik officials: A Bora was in charge of 20 paiks, a Saikia of 100 and a Hazarika of 1000. A Rajkhowa commanded three thousand and a Phukan commanded six thousand paiks.

=== Land survey ===
A land survey of the entire kingdom started by 1861. The Mughal pargana system was adopted in the newly acquired territories in Lower Assam.

Gadadhar Singha became acquainted with the land measurement system of the Mughals when he was hiding in Kamrup before he succeeded to the throne. As soon as the wars with Mughals were over he issued orders for the introduction of a similar system throughout his dominions. Surveyors were imported from Koch Behar and Bengal for the work. It was commenced in Sibsagar and it was not completed till after his death. This method of survey included measuring the four sides of each field with a nal, or bamboo pole of 12 feet (3.7 m) length and calculating the area. The unit of measurement was the "lucha" or 144 square feet (13.4 m^{2}) and 14,400 sq ft (1,340 m^{2}) is one "bigha". Four 'bigha' makes one 'pura'.

The measurement system helped in the equal distribution of land among the paiks as well as among the nobles and officers. Records of land were maintained under an officer called Darabdhara Barua. Thus all cultivable and occupied land, except homesteads and jungles, were surveyed and recorded. The paper on which this was recorded is called perakagaz or perakakat meaning (paper carefully preserved inside of wooden boxes called pera). As the perakagaz were not durable, copper plates called as tamrapatra or phali were issued for important records, particularly of revenue-free lands gifted to religious sites or to Brahamanas.

== Military ==
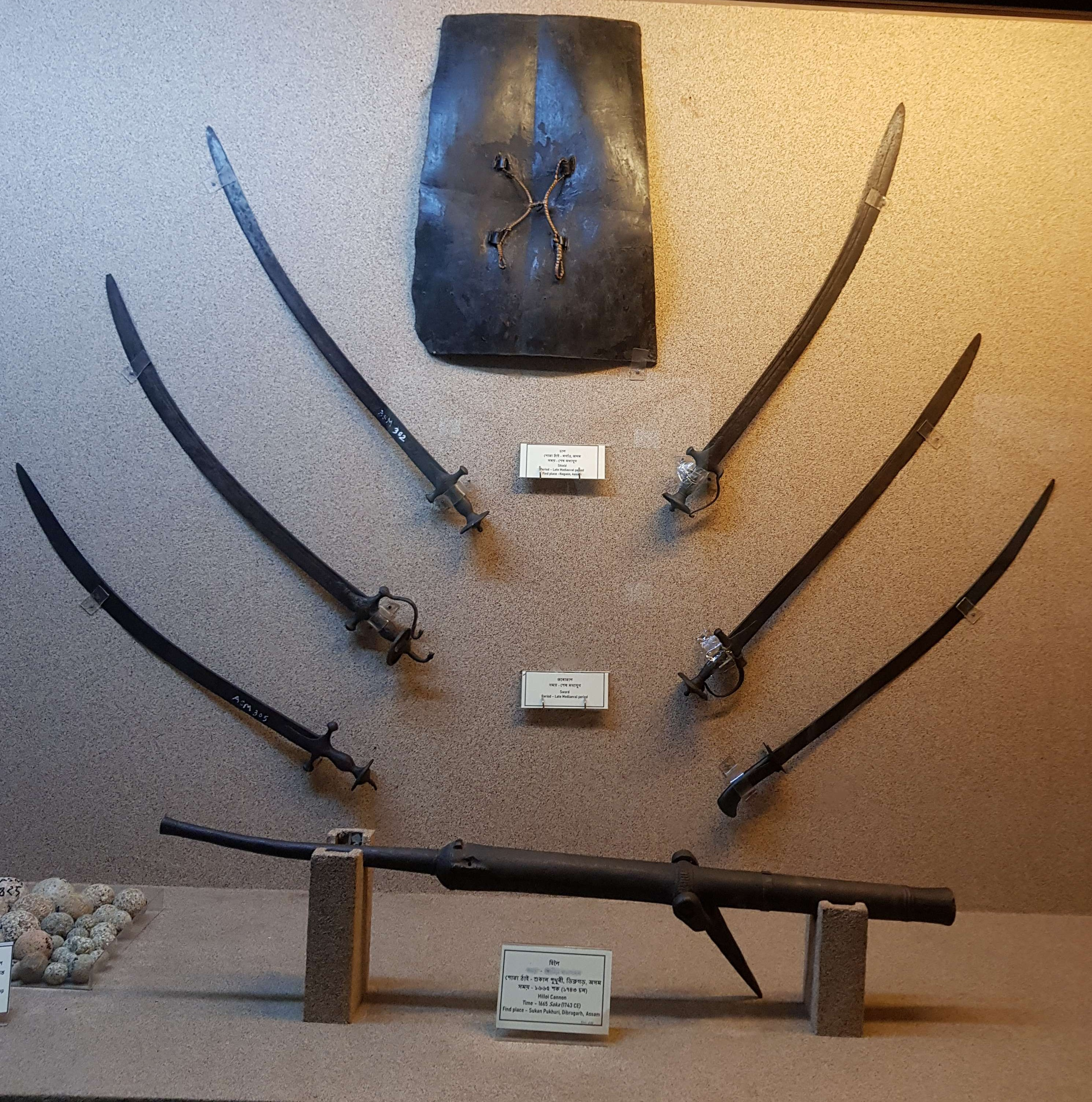
Weapons of Ahom era.

The Ahom military department consisted of infantry, cavalry, elephantry, artillery, espionage and navy. Land was given to martial paiks (militia) in exchange for their service. The paiks were organised under a got (group of four paiks), and further under a khel (department). The paiks were placed under the command of Paik officers, whose ranks as follows:

Paik Officer	Number of Paiks
Phukan	6000
Rajkhowa	3000
Hazarika	1000
Saikia	100
Bora	20

Swords, spears, bows, and arrows, guns, matchlocks, cannons were the primary weapons of the war. The cavalry commander was Ghora Barua, and the elephant commander was Hati Barua.

The people of medieval Assam were aware of the use of incendiary weapons. However, firearms were first introduced in the early 16th century. The Ahom troops quickly became experts in the manufacture of various types of guns, small and large, matchlocks, artillery, and large cannon. Kharghariya Phukan was the officer in charge of the manufacture of gunpowder.

The navy was the most important and powerful division of the Ahom forces. The main warships were known as bacharis. This shape was similar to Bengali kosahs, and each could carry 70 to 80 men. By the end of the Ahom kingdom, many of them were armed with guns. The Fathiya-i-ibriya mentions 32,000 ships belonging to the king of Assam at the time of Mir Jumla's invasion of Assam. These were primarily made of chambal wood and were thus light and fast and so difficult to sink. The navy was led by the Naobaicha Phukan and Naosaliya Phukan.

== Social classes ==
The Ahom were divided into seven clans, called collectively the Satgharia Ahom ("Ahom of the seven houses") aristocracy: the royal family of the Chaopha, the Burhagohain and the Borgohain families, and four priestly lineages—the Deodhai, the Mohan, the Bailung and the Chiring Phukan. These lines maintained exogamous marital relationships. The number of lineages increased in later times as either other lineages were incorporated, or existing lineages divided.

The apaikan chamua was the gentry that was freed from the khels and paid only money-tax. The paikan chamua consisted of artisans, the literati and skilled people that did non-manual work and rendered service as a tax. The kanri paik rendered manual labor. The lowest were the licchous, bandi-beti and other serfs and bondsmen. There was some degree of movement between the classes. Momai Tamuli Borborua rose from a bondsman through the ranks to become the first Borbarua under Pratap Singha.

== Culture ==
Ahom architecture

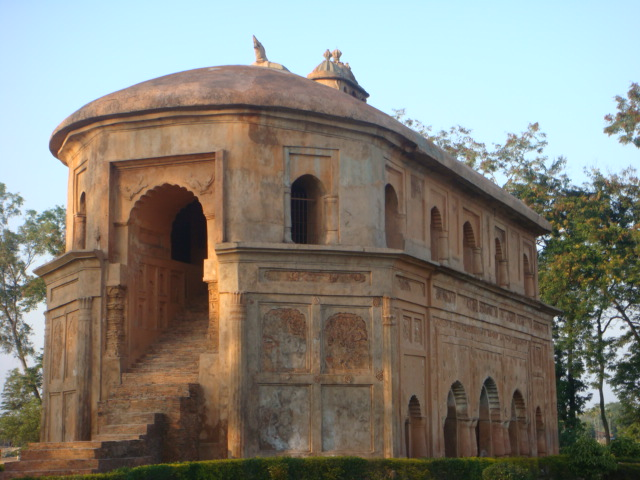
Rang Ghar, built by king Pramatta Singha in 1746. It one of the earliest pavilions in the Indian subcontinent.

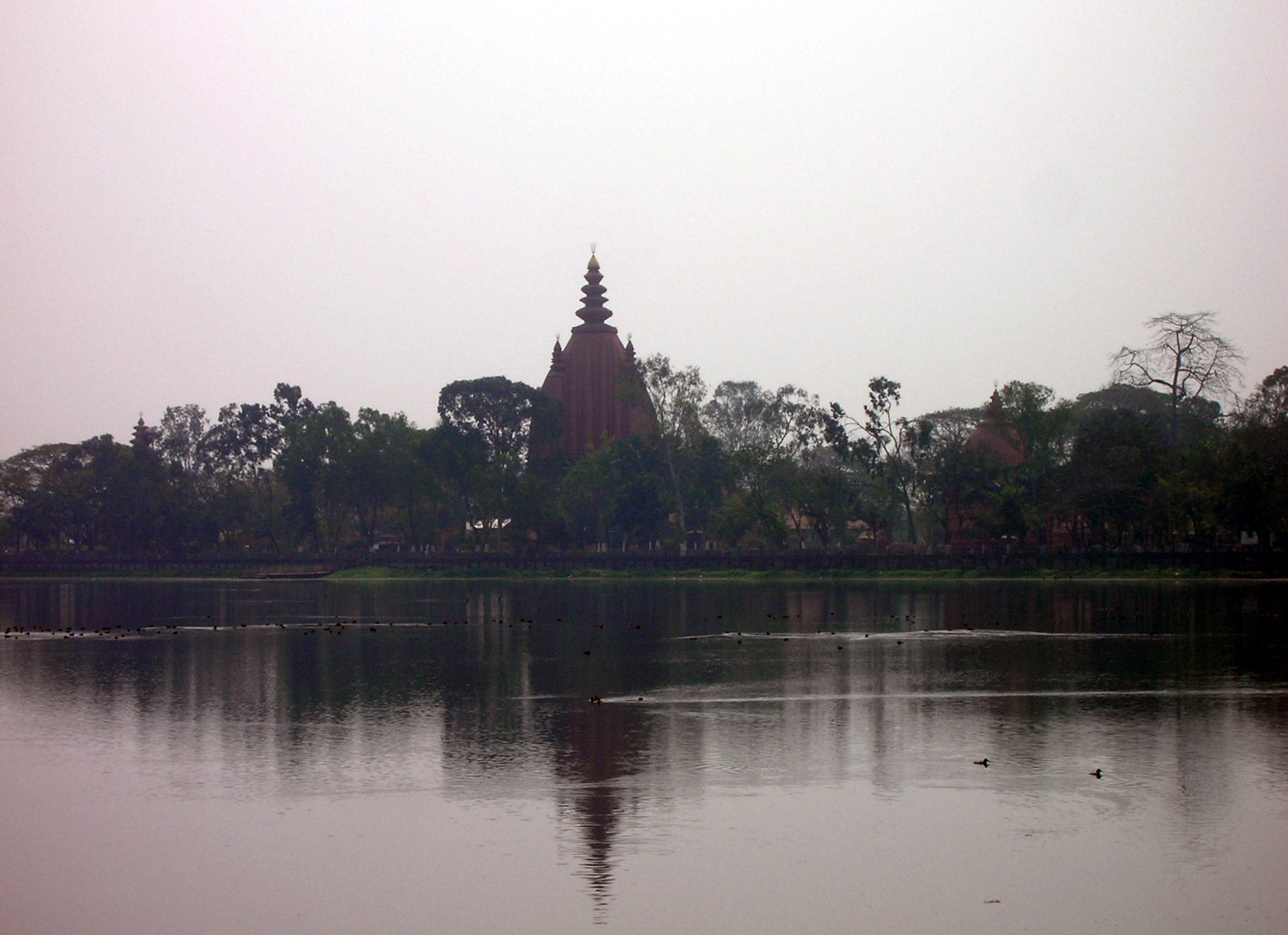
Sivasagar Sivadol, built by Bar raja Ambika, consont of king Siva Singha. It is the tallest monument built during the Ahom era.

=== Architecture ===
The metropolis at Rangpur contains the Talatal Ghar, Rang Ghar, Gola Ghar and in Garhgoan, Kareng Ghar.

==== Temples ====
A large number of temple constructions in the late medieval Assam are credited to the Ahom kings. Notable temples from the Ahom period includes– Sivasagar group of temples, Jaysagar group of temples, Gaurisagar group of temples, Rudrasagar temple, Negheriting shiva temple, Rangnath temple, Manikarneswar temple, Dirgheshwari temple, Hatimura temple, Kedar temple, Basistha temple, Sukreswar temple, Umananda temple, and Rudreswar temple.

==== Tanks ====
Numerous large and small tanks were excavated to necessitate the problem of water shortage and for religious purposes. Their grandeur was enhanced by the construction of temples in their bank. Notable tanks from the Ahom period includes– Sivasagar tank, Jaysagar tank, Gaurisagar tank, Lakshmisagar tank and Vishusagar tank or Rajmao pukhuri etc. The number of other tanks excavated by the Ahom rulers is estimated to be approximately 200.

=== Music and dance ===
The culture of music and dance was widespread and popular and received the patronage of royalty, the Ahom kings also held high regard for Mughal music and sent musicians to Delhi to learn it. Certain officers such as Gayan Barua were appointed to promote music.

=== Symbol ===
The royal insignia of the kingdom is known as Ngi-ngao-kham which is a mythical winged lion dragon.

== See also ==
- Ahom dynasty
- Ahom–Mughal conflicts
- Treaty of Ghilajharighat
- Ramani Gabharu
- Koch–Ahom conflicts
- Mueang
- Möng Mao
- Paik system
- Singarigharutha ceremony
- Hengdang
