= Ahom coinage =

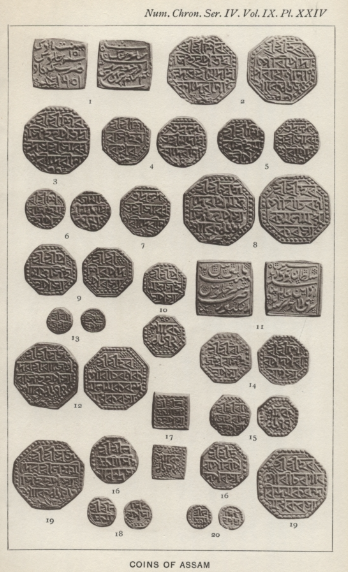
Different denominations and types of coins issued during Ahom era

Ahom coinage or Coins of Ahom Kingdom, issued from 1648 CE –1824 CE. First Ahom coin was issued by Jayadhwaj Singha (r. 1648–1663) and the last Ahom king to issue coin was Jogeswar Singha (r. 1821–1824). Coins were usually struck in octagonal shape, but square and round shapes coins were also issued but in limited quantity for special occasions and trade, the obverse of the coin contained the name of the king and date of coin and the reverse contained the imprint of the deity of the concerned king. The script used in coins was mainly Assamese, a few coins in Devanagari and Persian scripts were also issued. Ahom script in coins were extensively used during the war with Mughals. Chinese script was also used in order to meet out trade with Tibet, but is extremely rare.

Coins were both issued in gold and silver. The standard of purity was very high, between 94.1% to 98%. The standard weight was 11.3g with minor variations. The official mint was called Rajshal, located near the capital city. The mintmaster was called Sonardar Barua or Sonari Bordoloi, and the artist belonging to akharkatia khel (calligraphers guild) and khanikar khel (miner's guild) were employed as die-cutter. The principal denominations of Ahom coins were– rupee (Rajmohuree), half rupee (Adhali), quarter rupee (Siki), two annas (Admahia), one anna (Charatiya) and half anna (Tiniratiya).

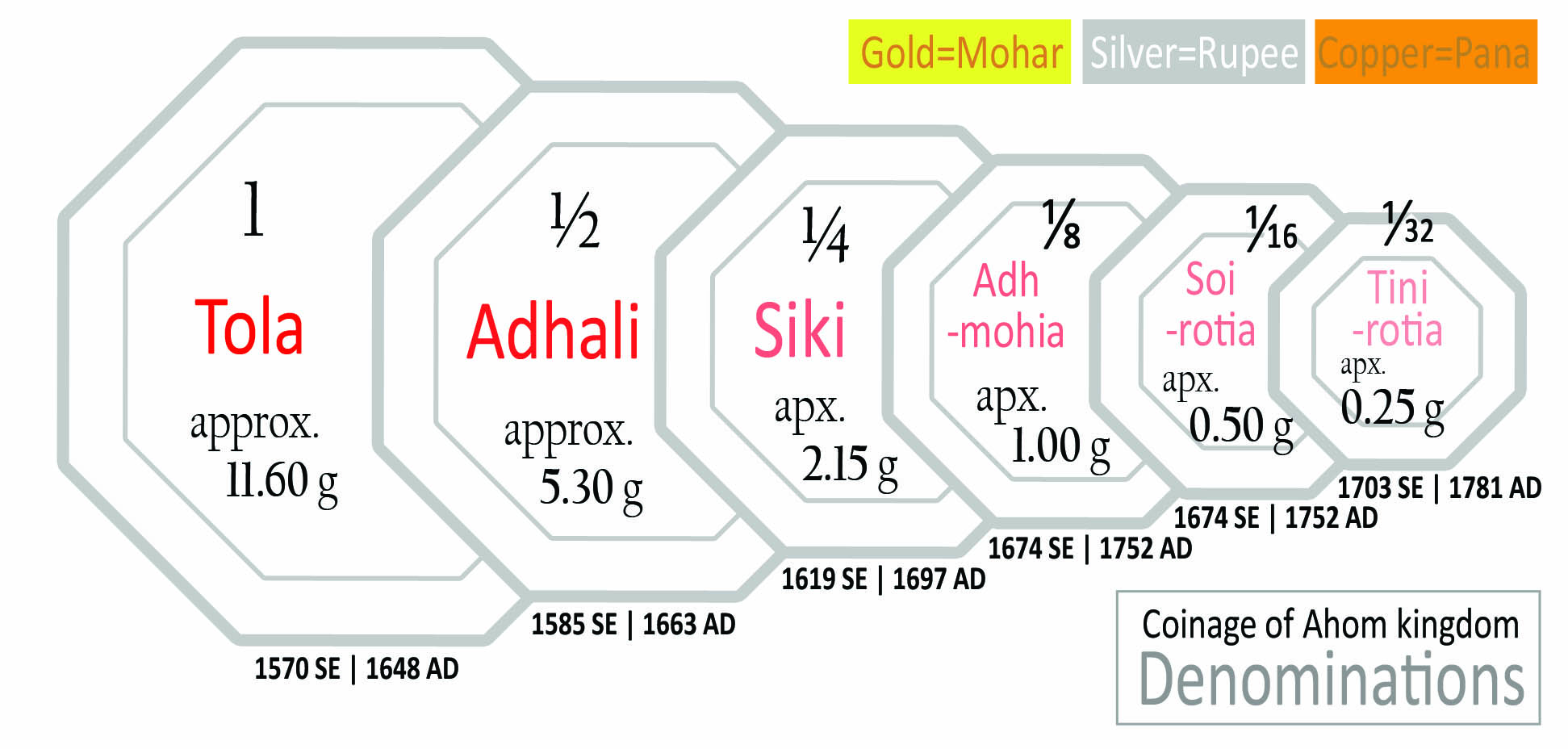
Denominations of Ahom coins

Before Rudra Singha (r. 1696–1714) all coins were dated to accession year of kings, since him all the coins had annual impress. Siva Singha (r. 1714–1744), for the first time, had the name of his queens impressed alongside him in the coins, his chief consort Phuleshwari was the first to issue coins in persian script Rajeswar Singha had his coins impressed in both Persian and Devanagari scripts. During the Moamoria rebellion, when the rebels wrested out the traditional monarchy, the Moamoria chiefs had impressed coins on their names but in Nonagonal coin shape.

== List of Ahom Kings with their coins ==
Ruler	Reign (CE)	Notes
Jayadhwaj Singha	1648 CE to 1663 CE	Special issue of Jayadhwaj Singha in chinese characters, for the purpose of trade with Tibet. Introduced coins in Sanskrit script.
Chakradhwaj Singha	1663 CE to 1669 CE	Half rupee coin introduced by him.
Udayaditya Singha	1669 CE to 1672 CE	Political turmoil led to 10 years of instability throughout the kingdom, leading to no regular issue of coins.
Gadadhar Singha	1681 CE to 1696 CE	Issued coins in Ahom script.
Rudra Singha	1696 CE to 1714 CE	Monetized the economy. Introduced half and quarter-rupee coins.
Siva Singha	1714 CE to 1744	Smaller coins, weighing 12 and 6 were introduced. Coins in Persian script were issued for the first time. The name of his queens was also imprinted on coins alongside his.
Pramatta Singha	1744 to 1751 CE	Re–introduced coins in Ahom scripts for his coronation ceremony.
Rajeswar Singha	1751 to 1769 CE	Issued coins in Devanagari, Arabic and Persian and Urdu languages
Lakshmi Singha	1769 CE to 1780 CE	First Moamoria rebellion, coins issued by the Moamoria chief, who briefly occupied the capital for 4 months.
Gaurinath Singha	1780 CE to 1794 CE	Introduced coins weighing 3 ratis. Contemporary to him, the Moamoria chiefs had also minted coins, who took control of the capital after wresting him.
Kamaleswar Singha	1795 CE to 1811 CE	Shifted the capital to Jorhat, established mint at there.
Chandrakanta Singha	1811 CE To 1818, 1819 to 1821	Issued coins in Assamese Script.
Purandar Singha/Brajanth Singha	1818 CE to 1819, 1833 CE to 1838 CE	Coins in the name of Brajanth Singha, father of Purandar Singha, were issued. Introduced Copper coins for the first time.
Jogeswar Singha	1821 CE to 1824	Jogeswar Singha, was a mere puppet of Burmese. He was the last king of Assam to have coins issued.
