= Kondaparthy =

- village
- Location in Telanganah, India Kondaparthy (India)
- Coordinates: 17°55′18.90″N 79°32′14.16″E
- Country: India
- State: Telangana
- District: Warangal

Languages
  - Official: Telugu
- Time zone: UTC+5:30 (IST)
- PIN: 506 003
- Telephone code: 0870
- Vehicle registration: TS
- Nearest city: Warangal

Kondaparthy is an ancient village in Hanamkonda district located 12 km from Warangal city in Telangana.

== Etymology ==
The name Kondaparthy is derived from two Telugu words: Konda, meaning hill, and parthy, meaning living place. Kondaparthy was named after the three hills which surround it.

== History ==
Kondaparthy has been settled since at least the 9th century A.D., and was historically known as Sri Kondiparthy Nagara. The village was ruled by the Kakatiya Dynasty. After Kondaparthy came under Kakatiya rule, Rudreswar and Keshava temples were constructed, in addition to a Proleswara temple that was constructed before Kakatiya rule. In the 11th century, Chaunda Senani – the general of King Ganapathideva, Kakatiya's king at the time – constructed a tank named Chaunda Samudram.
