= Na-Pukhuri Shiva Dol =

18th century Hindu temple

Coordinates: 26.9527°N 94.5855°E

Rudrasagar Shiva Dol Na-Pukhuri Shiva Dol
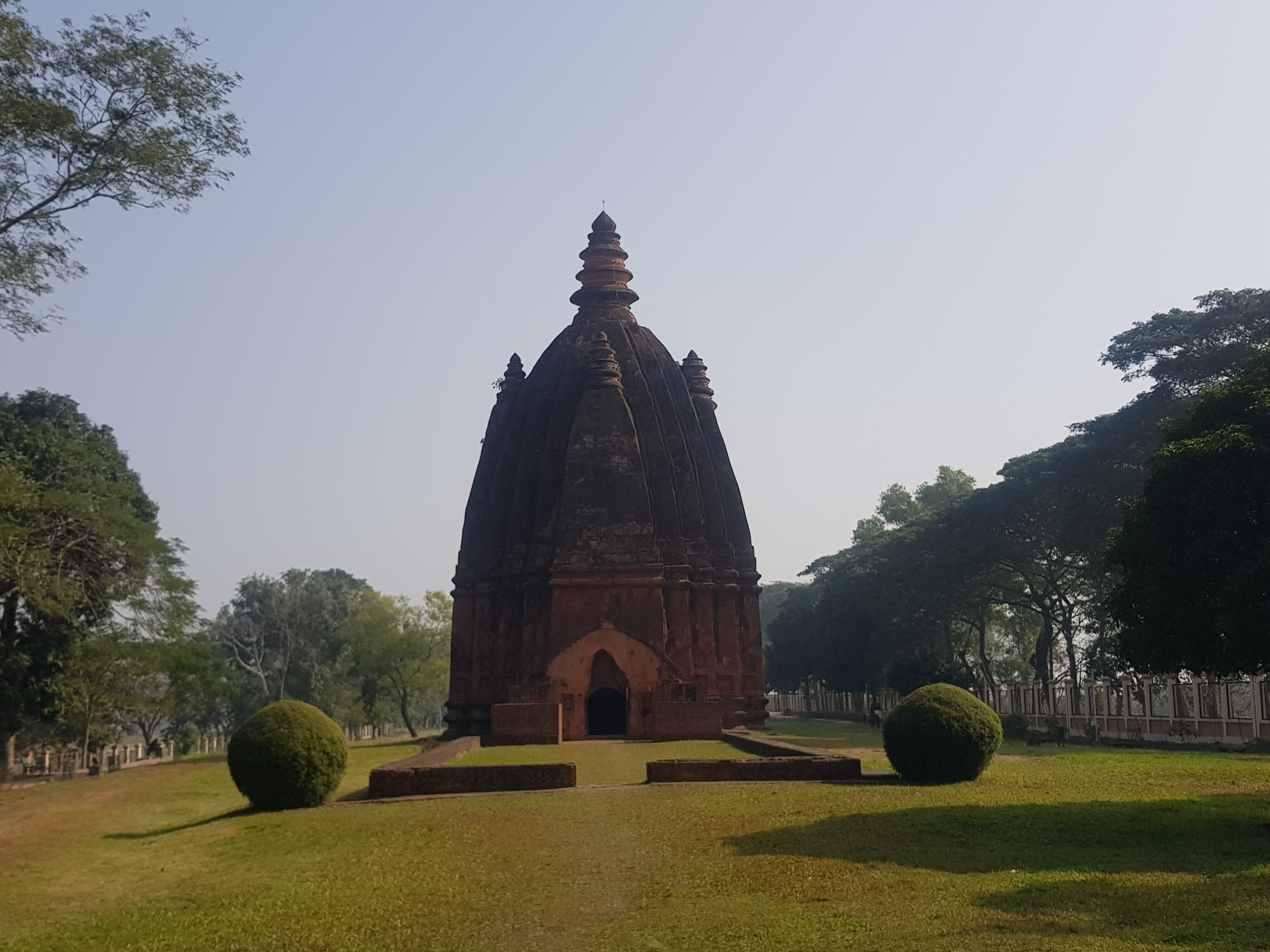
- Shiva dol

Religion
- Affiliation: Hinduism
- District: Sibsagar district
- Deity: Shiva

Location
- State: Assam
- Interactive map of Rudrasagar Shiva Dol; Na-Pukhuri Shiva Dol

Architecture
- Type: Tri-Ratha
- Creator: Lakshmi Singha
- Completed: 1773; 253 years ago
- Elevation: 25.95 m (85 ft)

Na-Pukhuri Shiva Dol or Rudrasagar Shiva Dol in an 18th-century Hindu temple constructed during the reign of king Lakshmi Singha (1769-1780). This temple is 8 km away from Sivasagar town. This is the last temple built during the Ahom era which represents grandeur before its overall decline in temple building and architectural building. This temple is located on the south bank of Rudrasagar Pukhuri (tank) which was excavated in honor of Rudra Singha. As Rudrasagar Pukhuri was excavated on the opposite of Athaisagar Pukhuri, it is also known as Na Pukhuri (New-Tank) and Athaisagar Pukhuri which was originally excavated during the reign of Jayadhwaj Singha as Purani Pukhuri (Old-tank).

This temple dedicated to Shiva was constructed in 1773 and was consecrated during the reign of Gaurinath Singha (1780-1794). It's a Tri-Ratha type temple raised on an octagonal base. The height of the temple is 25.95 metere (85.13 feet). The construction of the temple was supervised by one Madan Darika Hajarika.

== Gallery ==
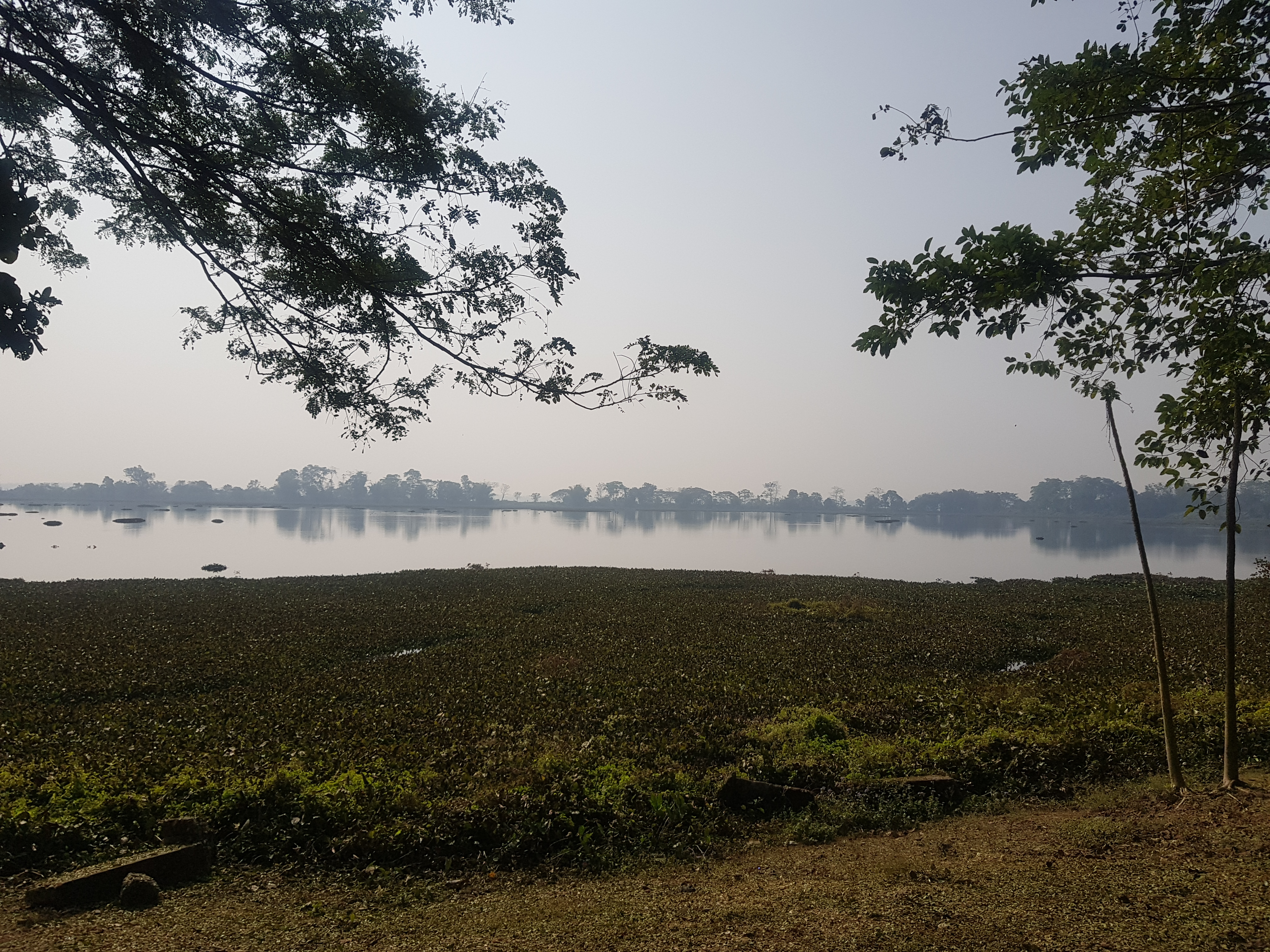
Na-Pukhuri or Rudrasagar

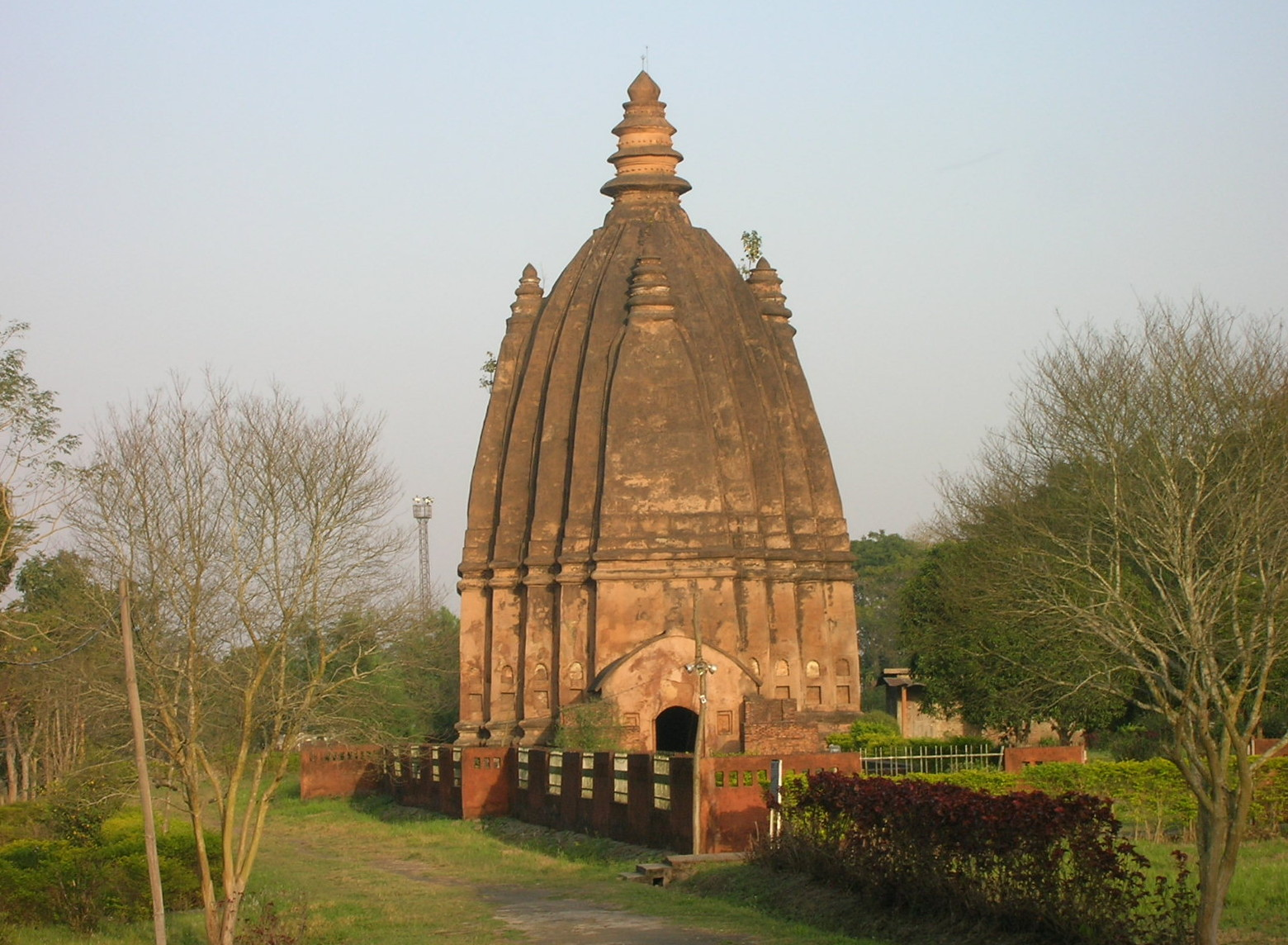
Shiva Dol front view

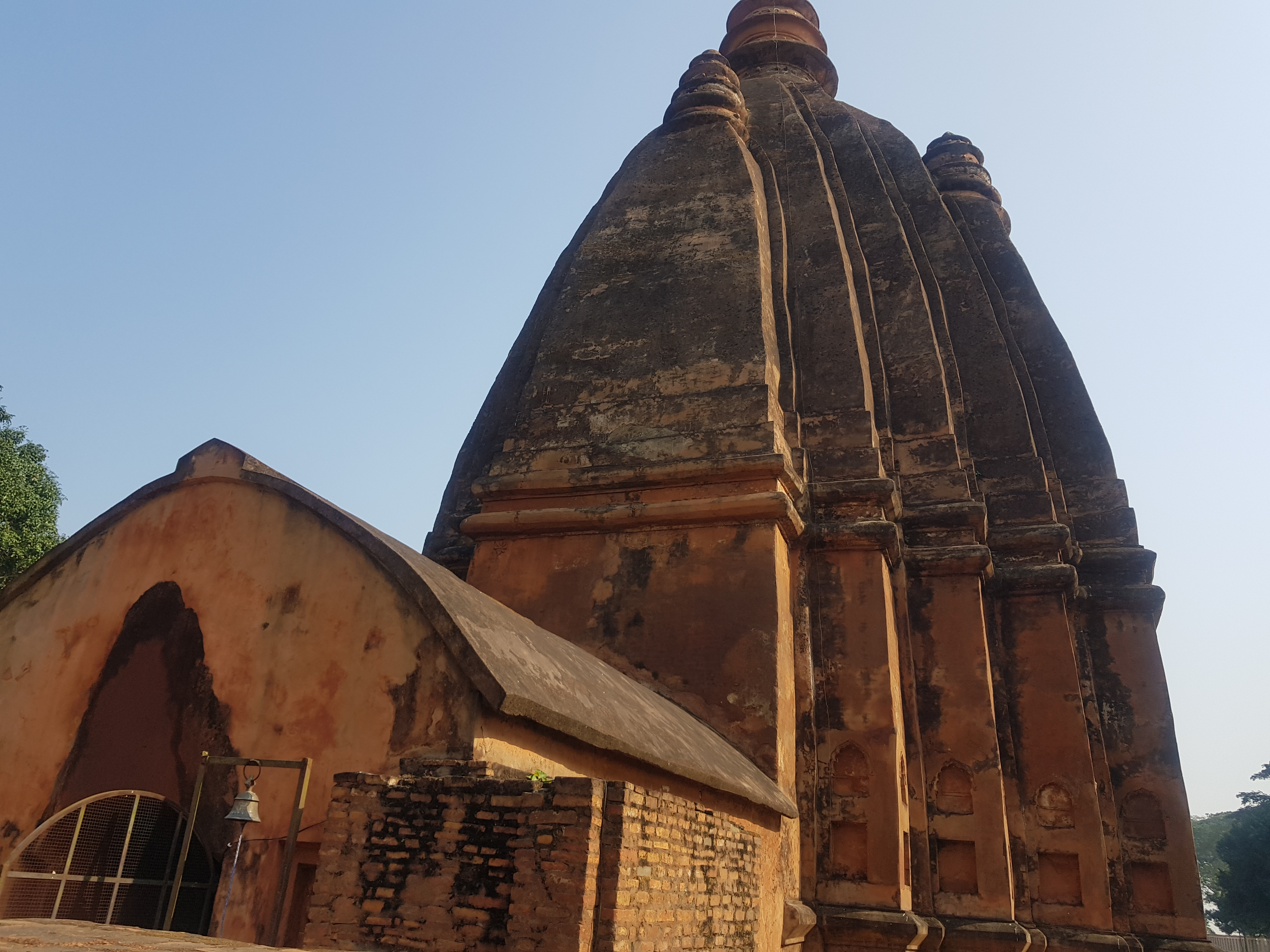
Close view of the temple

== External sources ==
- Konwar, Nirmal Jyoti (2018), History And Management Of The Temples Of Upper Assam From The 16th To The 20th Century A D
