= Kuranganayani =

Queen of Ahom dynasty

- Died: Ahom kingdom
- Spouse: Rajeswar Singha (m. 1768; died 1769) Raghab Borbarua (d. 1770) Lakshmi Singha
- Father: Ching-Thang Khomba
- Religion: Hinduism

Kuranganayani was a Manipuri princess who became Queen of the Ahom Kingdom. She was the daughter of Jai Singh, she was married to Rajeswar Singha. She was instrumental in killing Moamoria rebel Raghab Borbarua.

== Life and marriages ==
The Ahom King, Rajeswar Singha, helped Kuranganayani’s father reclaim the throne of Manipur. Out of gratitude, Ching-Thang Khomba offered Kuranganayani in marriage to Rajeswar Singha. Kuranganayani was sent in a marriage party with 2 nobleman, 1 elephant, 1 horse, 200 men and woman and much dowry. They were married in Manaimaji in 1768. They remained married until his death in 1769, after he was seriously ill for twenty days.

After the accession of her brother in law, Lakshmi Singha, Moamoria rebels revolted, attacked and imprisoned him. The chief, Ragho Borborua married Kuranganayani by force. She became important in the events that led to his death. She convinced Ragho that he should seek honour and take blessings and that all of his subjects in Assam wanted to give him gifts. On 11 April 1770, when Ragho Borborua went to the villagers thinking they would be thanking and blessing him, they attacked him with weapons and killed him.

Lakshmi Singha was later freed reinstalled to the throne, and he later married Kuranganayani.

After the death of Raghab Borborua and reinstallation of Lakshmi Singha, nothing is known after about her life as the Ahom Buranjis do not mention her again.
