= Rudreswar Temple =

Hindu temple in Assam, India

Rudreswar Devalaya
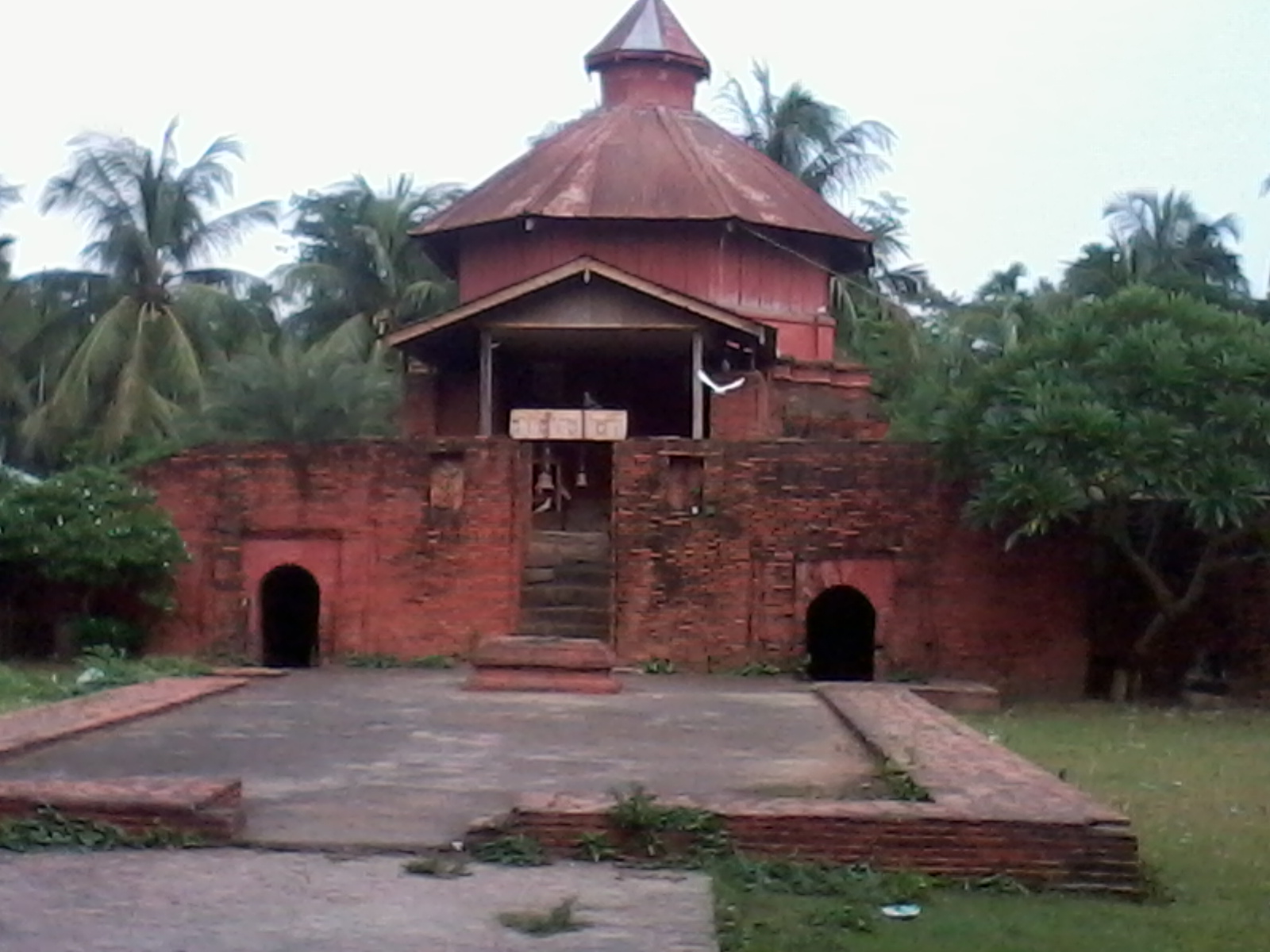
- Rudreswar Devalaya

Religion
- Affiliation: Hinduism
- District: Kamrup
- Deity: Shiva

Location
- Location: North Guwahati
- State: Assam
- Country: India
- Interactive map of Rudreswar Devalaya
- Coordinates: 26°12′34″N 91°43′28″E

Architecture
- Type: Hindu Temple
- Established: 1749; 277 years ago

The Rudreswar Temple or Devaloya is a temple dedicated to Lord Shiva in the village of Rudreswar, under Sila Sindhurighopa Mouza (revenue circle), on northern bank of the river Brahmaputra, in North Guwahati. Built in 1749 CE by Ahom king Pramatta Singha, in memory of his father Swargadeo Rudra Singha, the temple is a fine example of a mixed style of Ahom-Mughal architecture.

== History ==
King Rudra Singha son, Pramatta Singha, after ascending to the throne, decided to construct in Guwahati a temple to Lord Shiva in memory of his father. The site of his father's death was selected for the construction of the temple.

The temple was completed in 1749. After the completion of the temple, Pramatta Singha established a Shiva Linga in the temple and named it Rudreswar Shiva Linga, after his father Swargadeo Rudra Singha. The temple was named Rudreswar Devalaya and hence the village on which the temple was constructed is also known as Rudreswar. The king made arrangements for priests and people to maintain the temple and a donated large area of land in the name of the temple.

== Design and structure ==
The temple was constructed using the architectural design of both Ahom and Mughals. The design of the temple is an imitation of the Mughal mausoleum. The temple has underground chambers whose entrances are present at the front side of the temple.

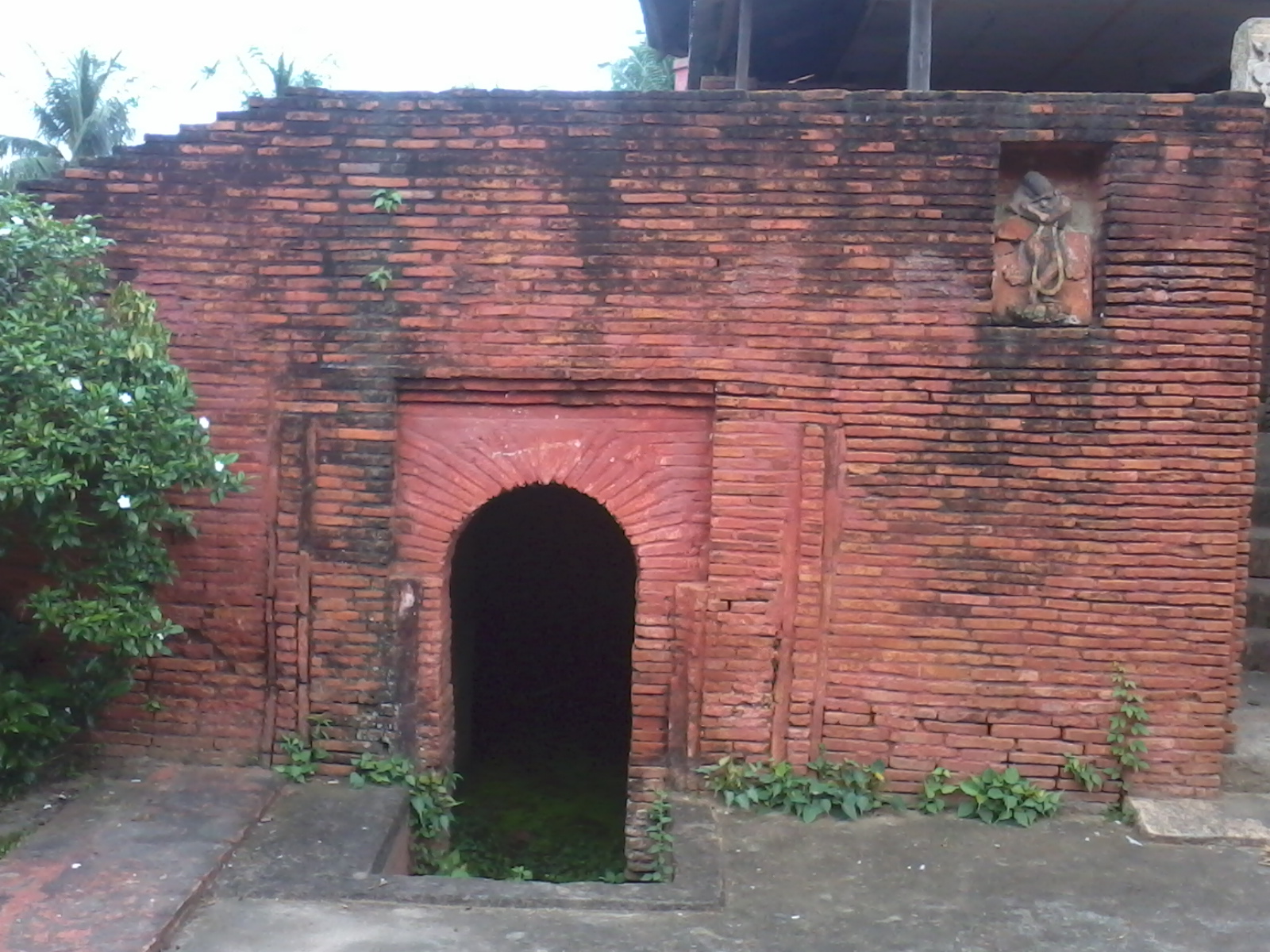
Rudreswar Temple entrance to underground chambers

It is not known precisely why these underground chambers were constructed, but, one can assume it was constructed for storing foods and other necessary items required for daily functioning of the temple. The Manikut (literally the jewel hut) or the chamber where the Shiva linga was present, is constructed above the underground chambers. Drainage system along with air ventilation system can also be seen in the structure of the temple. The temple was surrounded by a brick wall from all sides. The wall had two stone inscriptions of Ahom period which are presently preserved in museum. There is pond near the temple which is known as Konwari pukhuri or pond for the princess (Konwari in Assamese language refers to princess or queens of the kings). According to local people, the pond was used for bathing by the queens and princesses of Ahom king Rudra Singha when he was camping here for the military expedition of Bengal and hence the pond got its name.

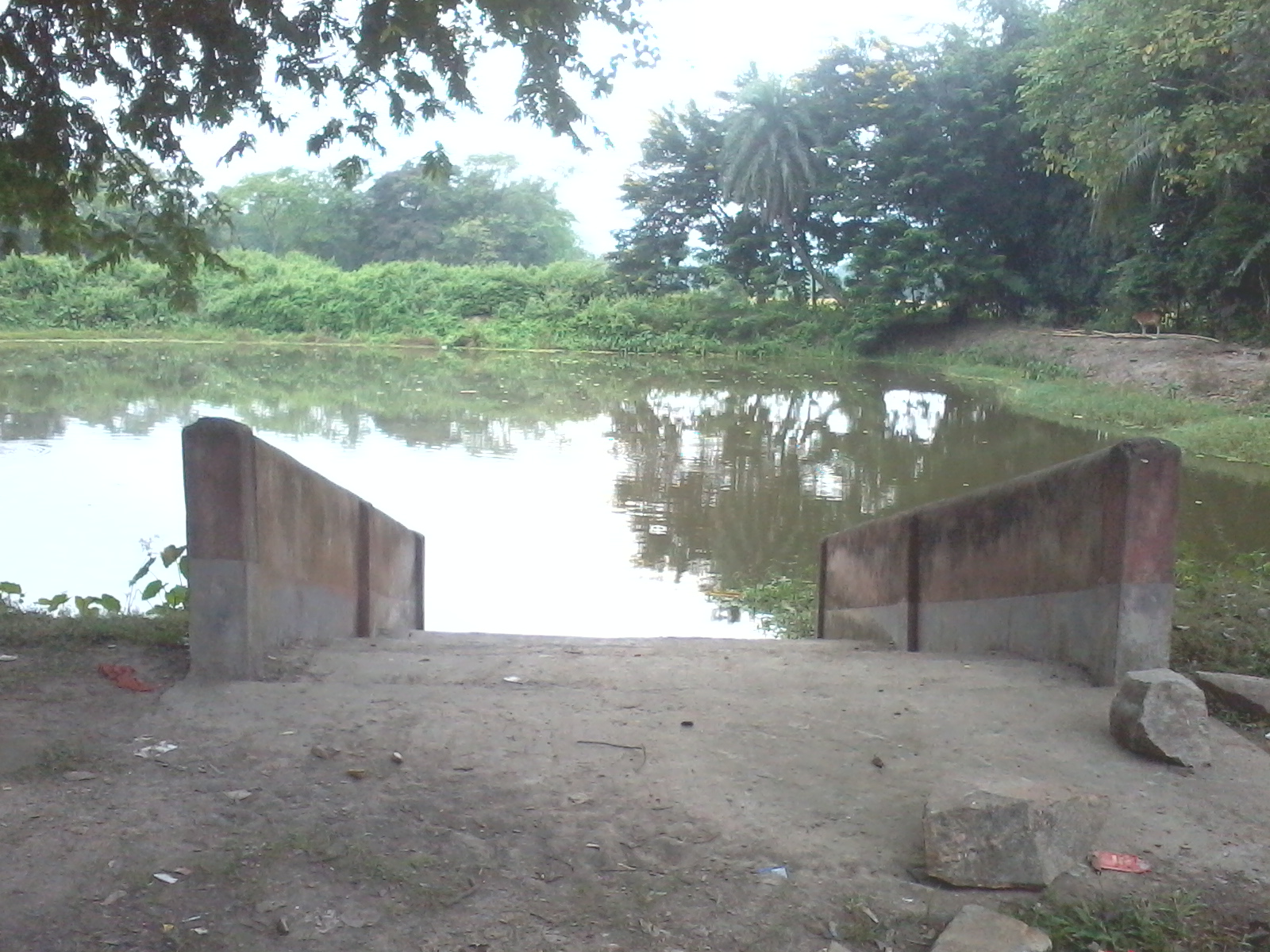
Konwari Pukhuri near Rudreswar Temple

Towards east from Konwari Pukhuri, another pair of ponds existed known as Hiloidari Pukhuri or the ponds of the artillery-men and musketeers(Hiloidari in Assamese language means musketeers or soldiers engaged in artillery).

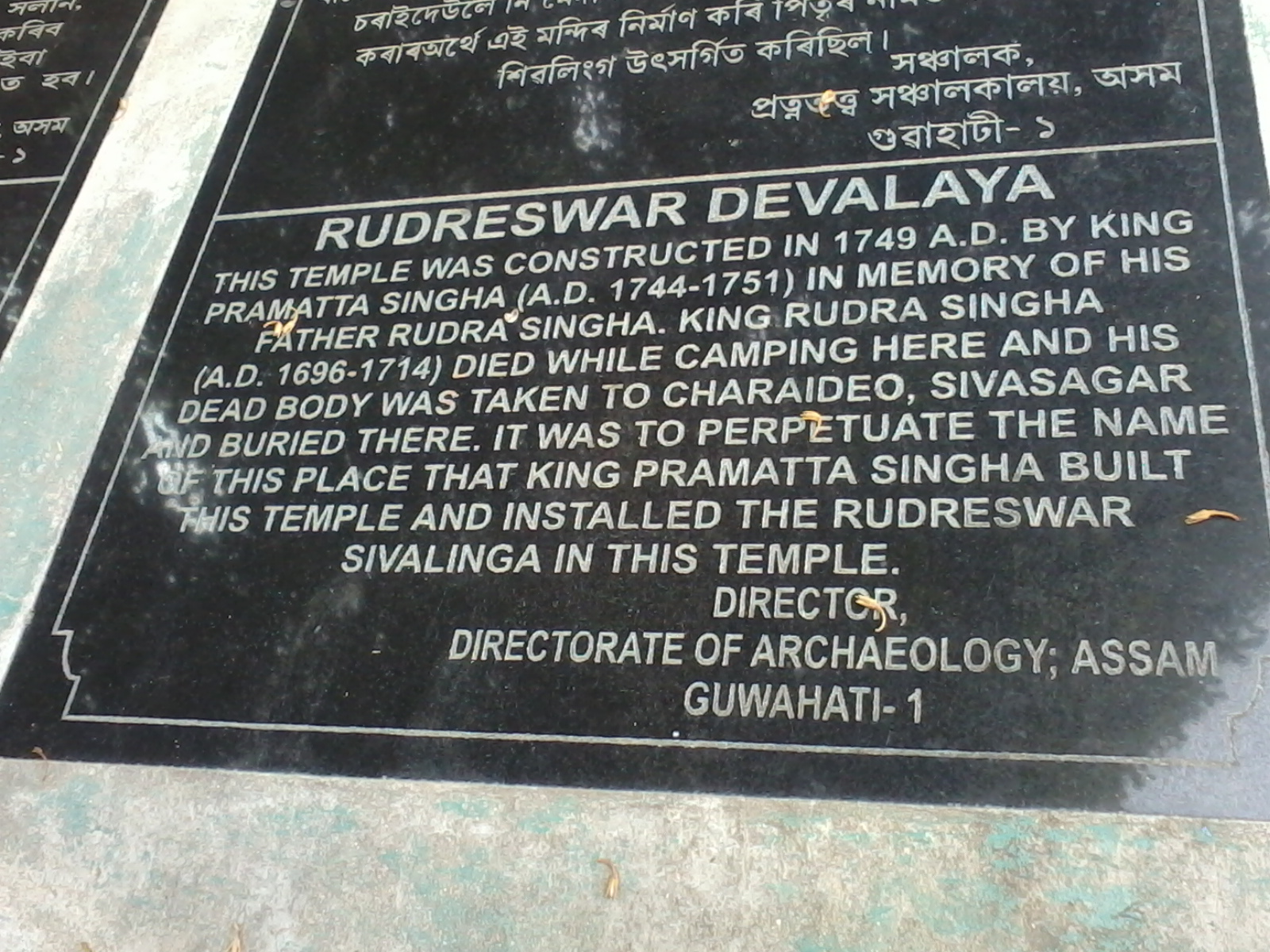
Notice of ASI in English in Rudreswar Temple

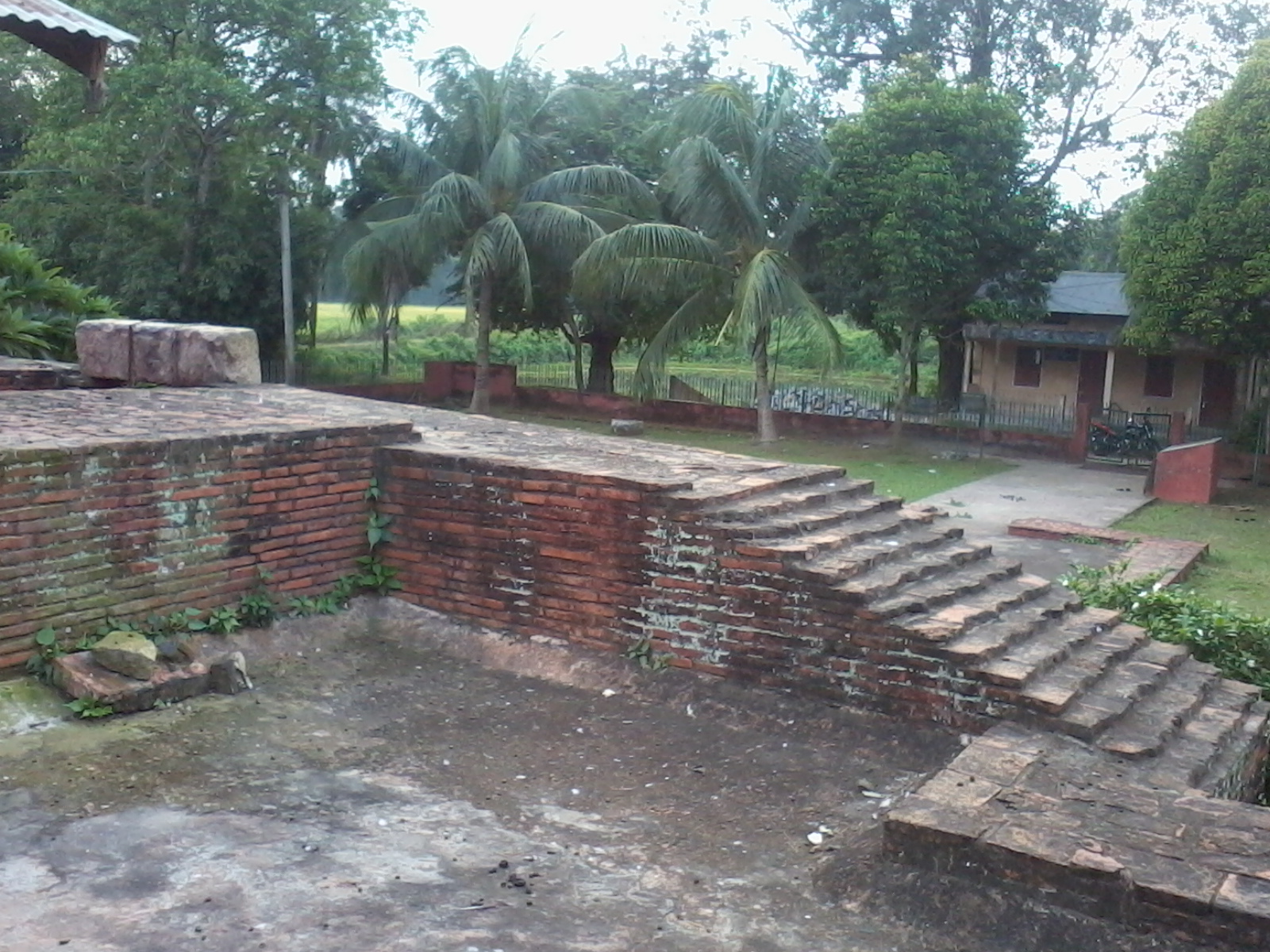
Upper terrace of Rudreswar Temple

== Present day ==
After the fall of Ahom Kingdom and establishment of British rule in Assam, the temple lost much of its lands and other privileges. It suffered greatly in the 1897 Assam and 1950 Assam–Tibet earthquakes. The temple's upper structure suffered tremendous damages. The local people, in a bid to preserve the temple, constructed the Manikut or the chamber where main religious function is held, roughly by woods and tins, to continue their religious functions. Later the temple came under the preservation of Archaeological Society of India (ASI) and the Government of Assam is also taking several steps for the restoration of the temple but still the construction is not yet complete.
