= Hatimura Temple =

Hindu temple in India

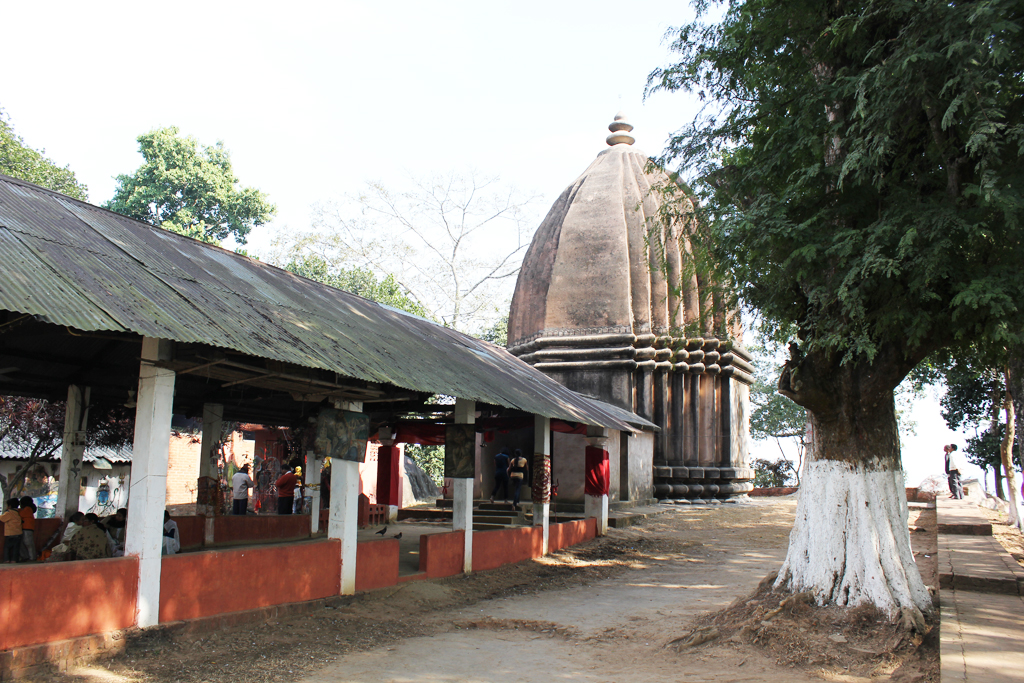
- Hatimura Durga Mandir

Religion
- Affiliation: Hinduism
- Deity: Durga

Location
- Location: Silghat
- State: Assam
- Country: India
- Interactive map of Hatimura Temple

Architecture
- Creator: Pramatta Singha
- Established: 1746; 280 years ago

The Hatimura Temple is a Hindu temple (Shakti Pitha), located at Hatimura Post office Jakhalabandha, Nagaon district of Assam, India. It was built during the reign of Ahom king Pramatta Singha in 1667 Sakabda (1745-46 CE). It used to be an important center of Shaktism in ancient Assam. The presiding goddess is Durga which is known here as Mahisamardini. Human sacrifice was said to be made at the temple's altars.
