= Lakshmi Singha =

King of the Ahom Kingdom (c. 1717–1780)

Lakshmi Singha Sunyeopha
- Swargadeo; Chaopha
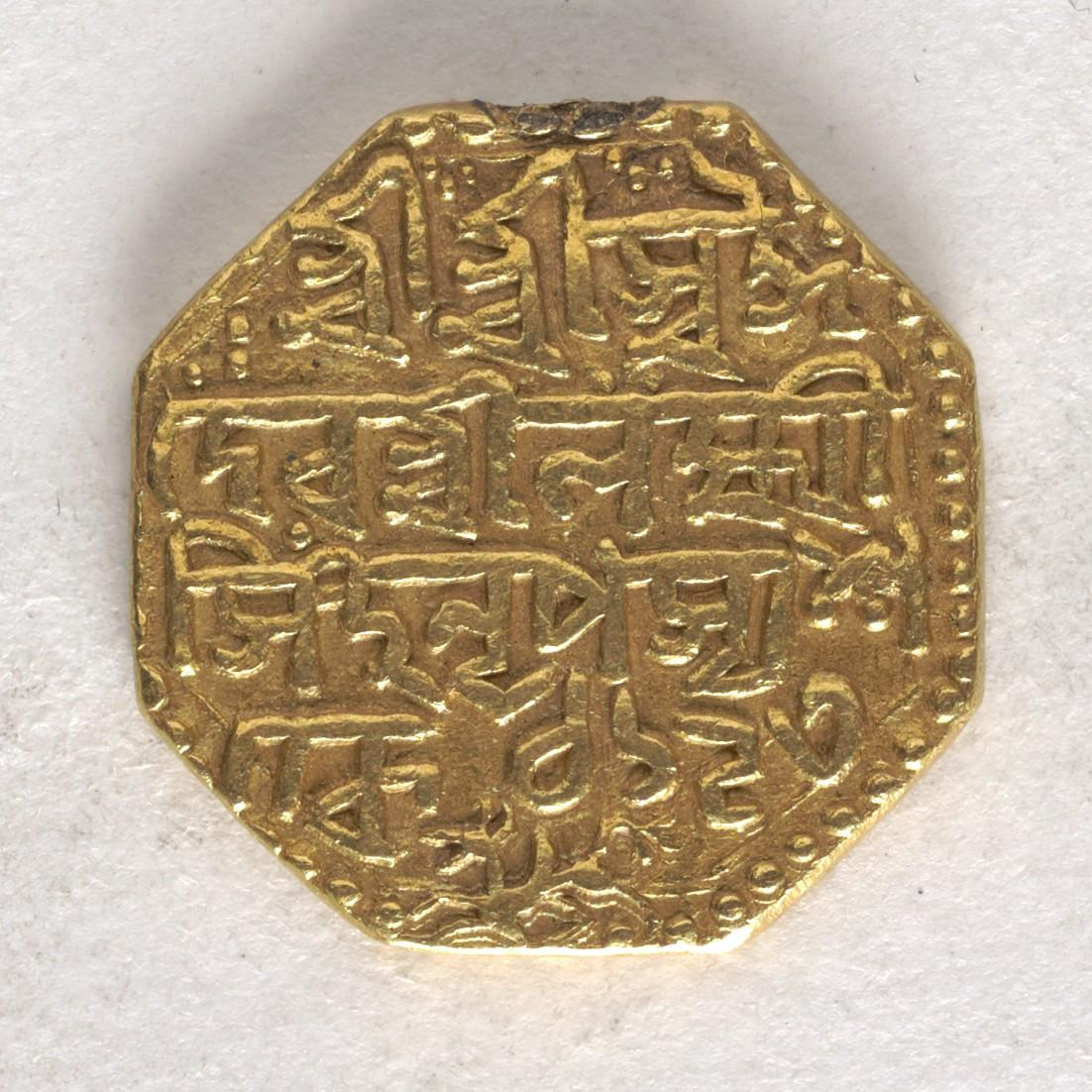
- Gold mohur of Lakshmi Singha, dated;1775

Ahom King
- Reign: 1769 – 13 December 1780
- Predecessor: Rajeswar Singha
- Successor: Gaurinath Singha
- Born: Kalsiliya Gohain c.1713 Kalsila, Morigaon, Ahom kingdom (present-day Assam, India)
- Died: 13 December 1780 (aged 67); Rangpur, Ahom kingdom (present-day Assam, India)
- Consort: Kuranganayani; Krishnapuria (Parvatia Konwari); Granddaughter of Jay Singha
- Issue: Lokenath Gohain; Two daughters
- House: Tungkhungia
- Dynasty: Ahom Dynasty
- Father: Sukhrungphaa
- Mother: Bogi Rajmao
- Religion: Hinduism (Shaktism)
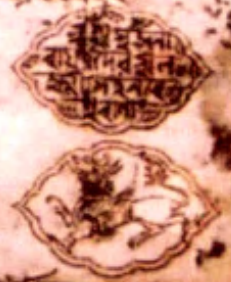
- Royal Seal

Lakshmi Singha (born Kalsiliya Gohain; c. 1713 – 13 December 1780), also known as Sunyeopha, was Ahom King from 1769 until his death in 1780.

After the death of Surempha, he married the Queen Kuranganayani and became the king of the Ahom kingdom. Shortly after he was installed he became a captive of the rebels of the Moamoria rebellion for a few months, but soon managed to regain his kingdom.

With the help of Kuranganayani, after destroying all the Moamoria rebels including Borbaruah Ragho, Lakshmi Singha was once again crowned as Ahom King. He died in 1780, and was succeeded by his son, Gaurinath Singha.

== Reign ==
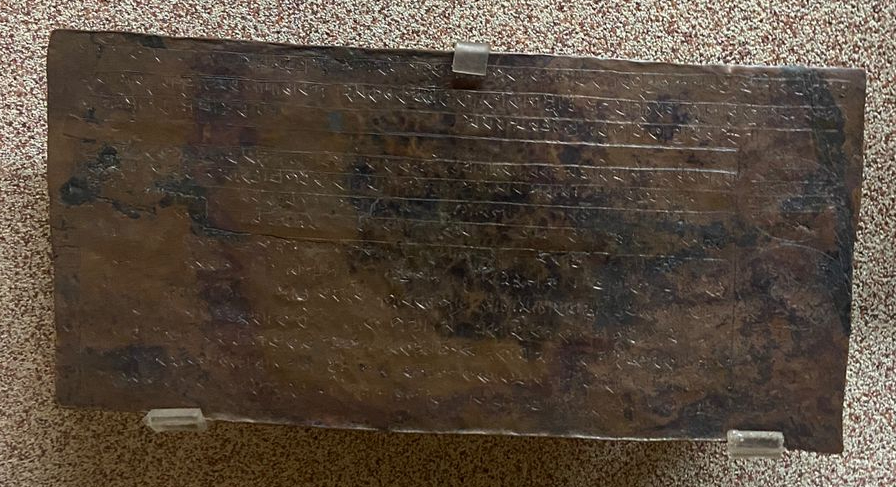
Copper plate inscription grant of Lakshmi Singha.

=== Accession to the throne ===
Despite his alleged illegitimacy, Kalsiliya Gohain at the age of 53, was made king by Kirti Chandra Borbarua in 1769. After his accession, he took the Hindu name of Lakshmi Singha and Ahom name of Sunyeopha, soon after he took measures to exile the sons of Rajeswar Singha to Namrup. His reign witnessed the first challenge to the Ahom government in the form of Moamoria rebellion.

=== Moamoria rebellion ===
The Moamorias started their rebellion towards the close of October 1769, allied themselves with banished princes and nobles (Mohanmala Gohain and two sons of Rajeswar Singha.)

Through their help they managed to gain the support even of the royalist. The Moamorias managed to captured Rangpur, and captured the king along with most of his nobles and executed many of them. But Lakshmi Singha was spared at the intercession of Mayamara Mahanta.

In 1770, the surviving royalists struck back, killed the chief Moamoria leaders, restored the monarchy and initiated a general massacre of the rebels and their associates. After his restoration, Lakshmi Singha ordered fresh settlement in Darrang, by increasing the rate of assesement. This created dissension among the Darrangis, accordingly four thousand inhabitants of Darrang marched in a body and forcibly appeared in front of the palace, protested and yeiled their demand. King Lakshmi Singha, having no way out, ordered suspension of the settlement of Darrang.

=== Later years ===
The remaining years of Lakshmi Singha reign were spent suppressing various minor rebellions and conspiracies, many of them organised by exiled Ahom princes. Kekura Kalita Phukan, who had previously obtained high favour of the Ahom king, after being driven away at the suggestion of the Patra Mantris (council ministers), organised a rebellion and procalimed himself as the king. But he was executed at time. A group of Muslims under the leadership of one Hazari Dewan, attempted to place an acclaimed son of Mohanmala Gohain to the throne, however they were unsuccessful and were let go with a light punishment. In 1779, the Chutias of Dihing under a chief of Nara raised a rebellion and killed the Borhat–Khowa Gohain, but were subdued.

=== Religious Policies ===
After being refused the initiation of Parvatiya Gosain on the grounds of his based illegitimacy, Lakshmi Singha took initiation of one Assamese Brahman named Ramananda Acharya and established him at Pahumara. Parvatiya Gosain with the view of deposing Lakshmi Singha supported the claims of other Ahom princes like Bhudar Singha and Malau Gohain, when revealed, King Lakshmi Singha expelled the Parvatiya Gosain. Eventually, the order of expulsion was withdrawn, but the schism once created couldn't be wiped out.

=== Death and succession ===
Lakshmi Singha died on 13 December 1780, and was succeeded by his son Gaurinath Singha, who was already declared Juvaraj (hier–apparent) in 1777. He's body was cremated according to Hindu rituals and his ashes and bones were then entombed in a Maidam, after being taken to Charaideo.

== Legacy ==
=== Civil works ===
Lakshmi Singha is credited with the construction of–

- Bogi Dol, currently exists in ruins.
- Rudrasagarar Dol, last temple built during the Ahom era which represents grandeur before its overall decline in temple building and architectural building.
- Hajor Jay Durga Mandir
- Janardan Mandir
- Bogi Dolor Pukhuri
- Gauri Ballabh Dol, constructed by the son of Na–Gosain and currently exists in Jaysagar.
- Iswaneswar, lies in ruins near Talatal Ghar campus.
- Rudrasagar Pukhuri
- Gauri Ballabh Pukhuri
- Ligiri Pukhuri.

== See also ==
- Ahom dynasty
- Kuranganayani
- Moamoria rebellion
