= Gaurinath Singha =

Suhitpangphaa Gaurinath Singha
- Chaopha; Swargadeo
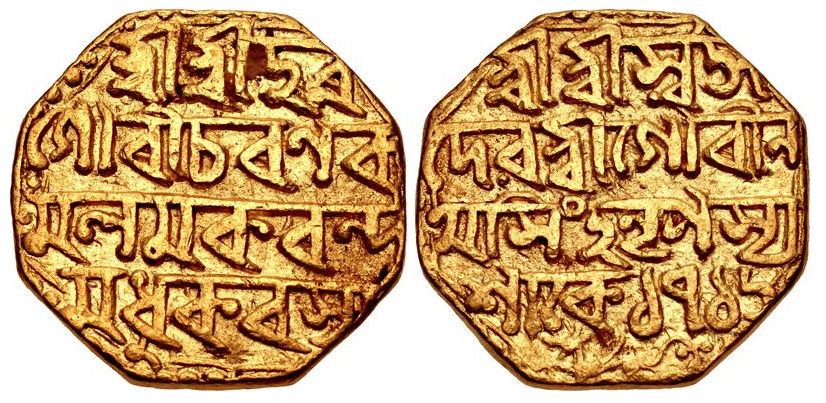
- Gold Mohur of King Gaurinath Singha

Ahom King
- Reign: 13 December 1780 – 19 December 1794
- Coronation: 21 April 1782
- Predecessor: Lakshmi Singha
- Successor: Kamaleswar Singha
- Born: Lokenath Gohain; 1765; Ahom kingdom
- Died: 19 December 1794 (aged 28–29); Jorhat, Ahom kingdom
- Spouse: Kamaleshwari devi
- Issue: Jayanti Aideo
- House: Tungkhungia
- Dynasty: Ahom Dynasty
- Father: Lakshmi Singha
- Mother: Naphuk (Step Mother)
- Religion: Hinduism

Gaurinath Singha (born Lokenath Gohain; c. 1765 – 19 December 1794), also known as Suhitpangpha, was Ahom King from 1780 until his death in 1794.

His reign was marked by the rise of the Moamoria rebellion and the decentralization of Ahom power. He was forced to flee from his capital owing to the rebels, he is characterized as weak, incapable, and a cruel ruler whenever intoxicated with opium where most of the power and influence remained over his nobles. He was the son of the previous reigning king Lakshmi Singha and the grandson of Rudra Singha, he was only fifteen years of age when he ascended to the throne, with no formal training or experience.

== Reign ==
Lokenath Gohain after the death of Lakshmi Singha, ascended to the throne in 1780 and assumed the Hindu name of Gaurinath Singha and Ahom name of Suhitpangpha. His first act as king was the mutilation of various ex-Ahom princes, to secure his post. In April 1782, the Moamoria rebels made a bold attack on the dual capitals, eventually, they were repulsed by the royalist and the monarchy promulgated an indiscriminate massacre of all the Moamorias, which led to widespread depopulation, and the economy was on the verge of collapse. Gaurinath Singha and his officials sentenced the Solal Gohain to death. The reassembled rebels raised their banner of rebellion from the north of Daphla Hills, and after prolonged struggles and toil, defeated the royalists' forces. In January 1786, the rebels encircled the capital city and captured it. Gaurinath and his officials away from the capital, made multiple attempts to usurp the authority of the rebels, but to no avail. In 1790, the inhabitants of Nagaon under the leadership of one Sindhura Hazarika encircled Gaurinath's camp. They complained about their miseries due to the prolonged stay of the king and his numerous camp-followers in Nagaon. They demanded the dismissal of his many officials, who were responsible for their oppression.

=== Disturbances in Lower Assam ===
Lower Assam was previously unaffected for the most part, by the Moamoria rebellion. The entry of refugees and their plundering caused irritation of the Darrangi peoples. Same as this, the Deka and the Burha Rajas of Darrang, joined with the hands of the conspirators but they didn't succeed. They were subsequently, executed. In 1791, a sum of discontented elements and a deprivation of his lawful succession, a Koch prince by the name of Krishnanarayan, claimant to the throne of Deka rajaship of Darrang, rose to rebellion. He intercepted the services of Burkundazes (mercenary soldiers), and did a forced possession of Darrang. He with Haradatta occupied North Guwahati. The Burkundazes were mercenaries made up of people from all Hindu castes and religions. They roamed free and perpetrated atrocious crimes upon the defenseless Assamese. The depredations committed by the Burkundazes, who were originally recruited from Company's territories, were repeatedly reported by the frontier Ahom officers to the British officials. After having received the reports from the Borphukan, the British Collector of Rangpur issued a warrant for the Burkundazes to quit the Assamese territories. Meanwhile, Gaurinath and his officials tried to settle the dispute with Krishnanarayan by granting him his demands, but Krishnanarayan was prevented from accepting by his Burkundazes, "whose plundering activities would cease with the cessation of hostilities; all the more a huge amount of arrears had to be paid before any settlement." Unable to get into terms for settlement, Gaurinath appealed for military aid to the British Governor-General for the expulsion of the Burkundazes from Assam.

=== Welsh Expedition ===
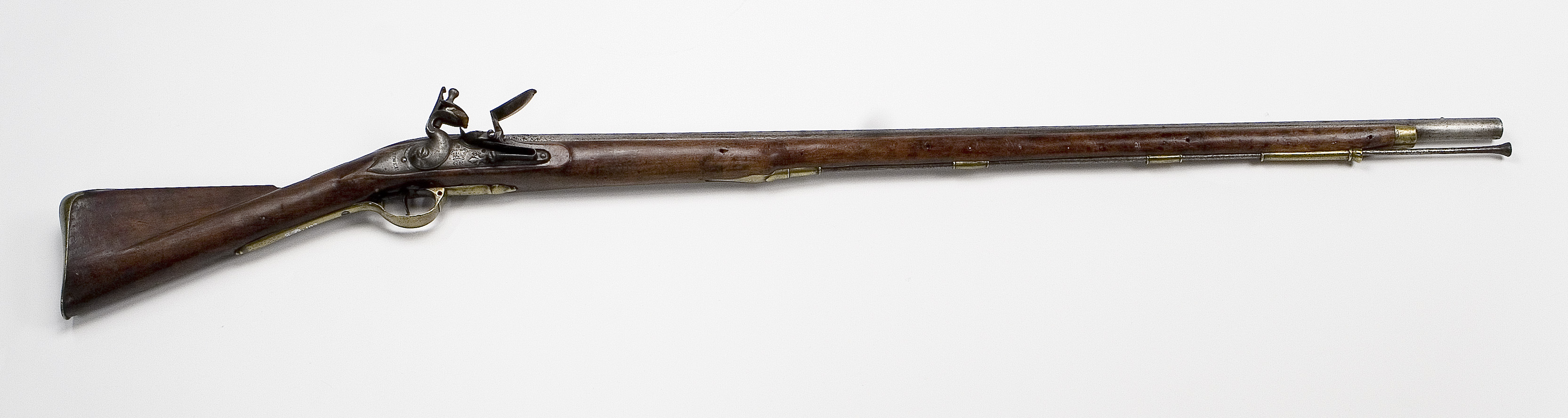
Brown Bess Musket used by the Company troops in their expedition to Assam

Governor-General Cornwallis considering the situations and indirect responsibility of the British government, order were issued for the despatch of a contingent of troops under the command of Captain Welsh. The small expeditionary force under Captain Welsh showed great effectiveness in suppressing many rebellious activities, he captured Guwahati on 25 November without any resistance, the Burkundazes were expelled from North Guwahati on 6 December. On 26 December, Krishnanarayan's force was defeated and he fled to Bhutan. After having completed the primary objectives, Welsh was directed to the general restoration of peace in Assam. Captain Welsh complained about the weaknesses, inadequacy and villainy of Gaurinath's character and his diabolical ministers. In November 1792, a commercial agreement was set up between the two governments. Nevertheless, after having settled the affairs in lower Assam, the expedition was now directed towards the Moamorias with the general view of restoring peace in Assam. Captain Welsh moved to advance towards Rangpur and finally captured it on 18 March 1794. Welsh received orders of his recallment on 21 April. The process of complete submission of the Moamorias was only waiting, King Gaurinath aware of the dangers awaiting after the recallment of British troops, requested the Governor-General to let Welsh remain in Assam. However, no favourable response was received.

After Welsh departure, Gaurinath fled from Rangpur to Jorhat for his protection. Gaurinath Singha died questionably prematurely in December 1794. His death was concealed for a few days by the official Purnananda Burhagohain. He proceeded to assassinate his opposition, the Borbarua, and place his own nominee on the throne, Kamaleswar Singha. Kamaleswar Singha was a toddler at the time. For a brief period that started from this year to the Burmese invasion, the Burhagohain became a de facto ruler of the Ahom state.

== Character and legacy ==
Gaurinath Singha is usually regarded as an unsuccessful ruler. In a contemporary British document it is stated: "The Assam Raja is a very weak man on whom no dependence could be placed, he is generally intoxicated with opium and, when sober, totally incapable of all business, which is transacted by his ministers. These men are devoid of honesty, inimical to their master and rapacious to the country." Sir Edward Gait concludes him as the most incompetent, bloodthirsty and cowardly of the Ahom kings.

Gaurinath Singha was quite young at the time of his accession and inexperienced. This factor was highly exploited and he subsequently became a puppet in his ministers' hands. The people had hitherto enjoyed a fair measure of happiness and prosperity but during the reign of these officials and Gaurinath, they were plunged into the depths of misery and despair.

== See also ==
- Ahom dynasty
- Ahom Kingdom
- Moamoria rebellion
