= Gunamala =

1552 book by Srimanta Sankardeva

Gunamala (Assamese: গুণমালা) is a scripture written by Sankardev within one night at the request of Koch king Nara Narayan in 1552. It is an abridged version (handbook) of Bhagavata Purana capturing in racy, rhyming and sonorous verses. The poet recounts many incidents from Lord Krishna's life making them easy to remember in this book.

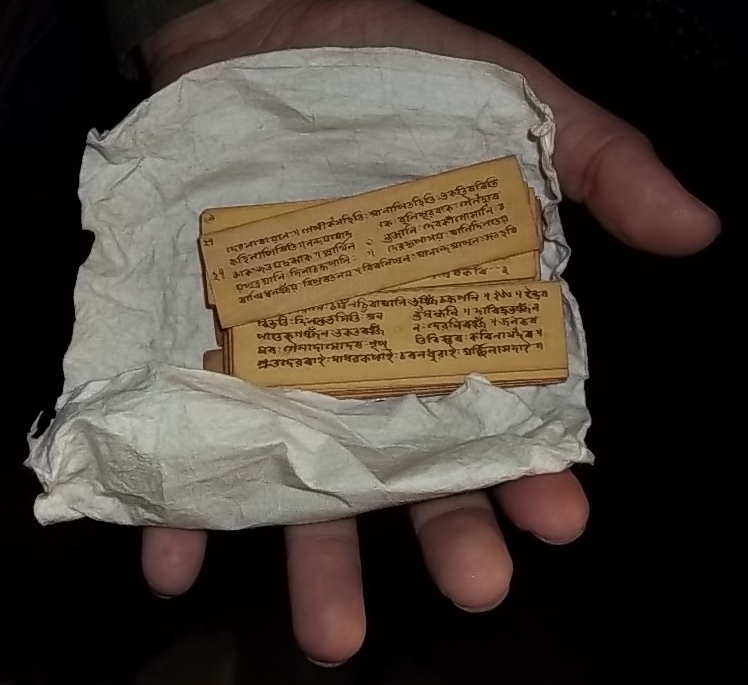
A copy of Gunamala, in the museum of Bengenati Sattra written in Sachipaat

== Background ==
One day, King Naranarayan held some debates in his court between the Pandits and Sankardev. King Naranarayan once asked the court poets to give him, in one day, a condensed version of the entire ten cantos of the Bhagawat Purana. When all Pundits said it was not possible to do so in such a short time, Sankardev took up the challenge and accomplished the feat in one night.

After he had condensed the substance of the ten chapters of the Bhagawat Purana into a small booklet, he put it into a small wooden box. Then he painted the box with hengul-haital (yellow and red) an elephant squeezed inside a circle. He called it Bhurukaat Haathi- meaning an elephant squeezed in the Lime-pot (in Assamese: হাতী মাৰি ভুৰুকাত ভৰোৱা)! The pleased King Naranarayana honoured Sankardev.

== Translation ==
In 1923, Benudhar Rajkhowa translated this book for the first time into English subtitled as Garland of Praises in verse.

Again the English translation of this book in prose subtitled as Garland of Virtues was released on 7 April 2013. The translation has been done by Dr. Sanjib Kumar Borkakoti, who has translated Sankardev's Borgeets and Madhavdev's Namghosha a few years back.

In 2010, Devi Prasad Bagrodia translated this book into Hindi and published keeping the same name Gunamala in both book as well as audio CD form.

== Usage ==
This book is greatly revered by the followers of Eka Sharana Nama Dharma, who keep it at the Guru asana (altar) in the congregational prayer-house called Namghar as the symbol of God.

== See also ==
- Bhagavat of Sankardev
- Kirttan Ghosha
