= Vrindavani vastra =

Assamese religious drape

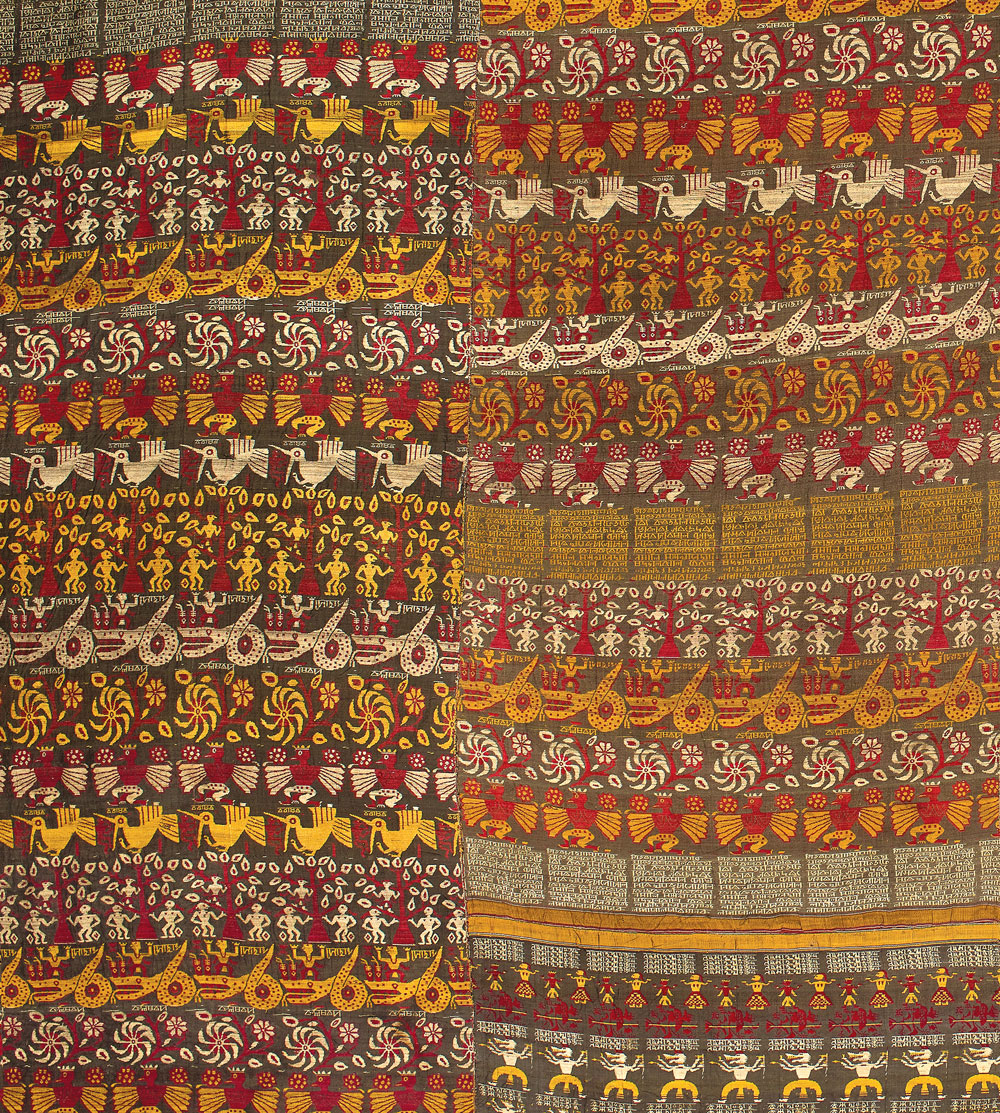
Vrindavani Vastra (detail), circa 1680, British Museum

Vrindavani Vastra is a drape woven by Assamese weavers led by Mathuradas Burha Aata during 16th century under the guidance of Srimanta Sankardeva, a Vaishnavite saint and scholar who lived in present-day Assam. The lead weaver Mathuradas Burha Aata was a disciple of Sri Sri Madhabdev, who was the first Satradhikar of the Barpeta Satra. Mathuradas Burha Aata along with his 12 assistant weavers wove the Brindavani Bastra. The large drape illustrates the childhood activities of Lord Krishna in Vrindavan. Parts of the original Vrindavani vastra are presently owned by the Victoria and Albert Museum in London and Musee Guimet (the Guimet Museum) in Paris. The piece of cloth demonstrates the skillful weaving methods developed during medieval times and such complexity is rarely seen in present-day Assam.

== History ==
Assamese silk weavers depicted scenes from Bhagavatha, Mahabharatha, mainly of the childhood days of Lord Krishnalala on silk clothes under the supervision of Saint, scholar, and poet Srimanta Sankardeva and his disciple Madhvadeva during 16th Century. First woven between 1567 and 1569, it was taken to Bhutan and then later to Tibet, where European merchants brought it back to Europe. Presently, it is owned by the Victoria and Albert Museum in London and the Musee Guimet in Paris. Some reports suggest that the Vrindavani Vastra piece was collected by a reporter of "The Times" (London) and donated to the museum around 1904. Similar silk drapes are also held by other museums like The Philadelphia Museum of Art. In 2004, a similar piece of silk drape, probably designed by Sankaradeva during 16th Century, was put up for auction by the auction house of Christie's in New York, with a reserve price of $120,000. This type of silken-weaving artwork was produced up to around 1715 in Assam and its neighborhood and exported to places like Tibet.

The exhibit owned by British Museum, acquired in 1904 from Tibet, is nine and half meters long and is made up of several pieces of silk drapes depicting Krishna's (or Vishnu's) life. Along with colorful pictorial depictions, it has a portion of a poem written by Srimanta Sankardev woven on it.

There were futile efforts by government agencies of India to bring back the silk drape back to India. During 2013, Assam government, India has requested British Museum to exhibit Vrindavani Vastra at London so that art lovers, researchers, and local people with Assamese heritage can admire the piece of art. This textile is now on display until August 2016 in the exhibition 'Krishna in the garden of Assam: the cultural context of an Indian textile' in Room 91 of the British Museum. Entry is free.

== See also ==
- Borgeet
- Ankia Naat
- Bhaona
- Dihanaam
- Hiranaam
- Kirtan Ghosha
- Khol
