= Drama =

Artwork intended for performance; formal type of literature

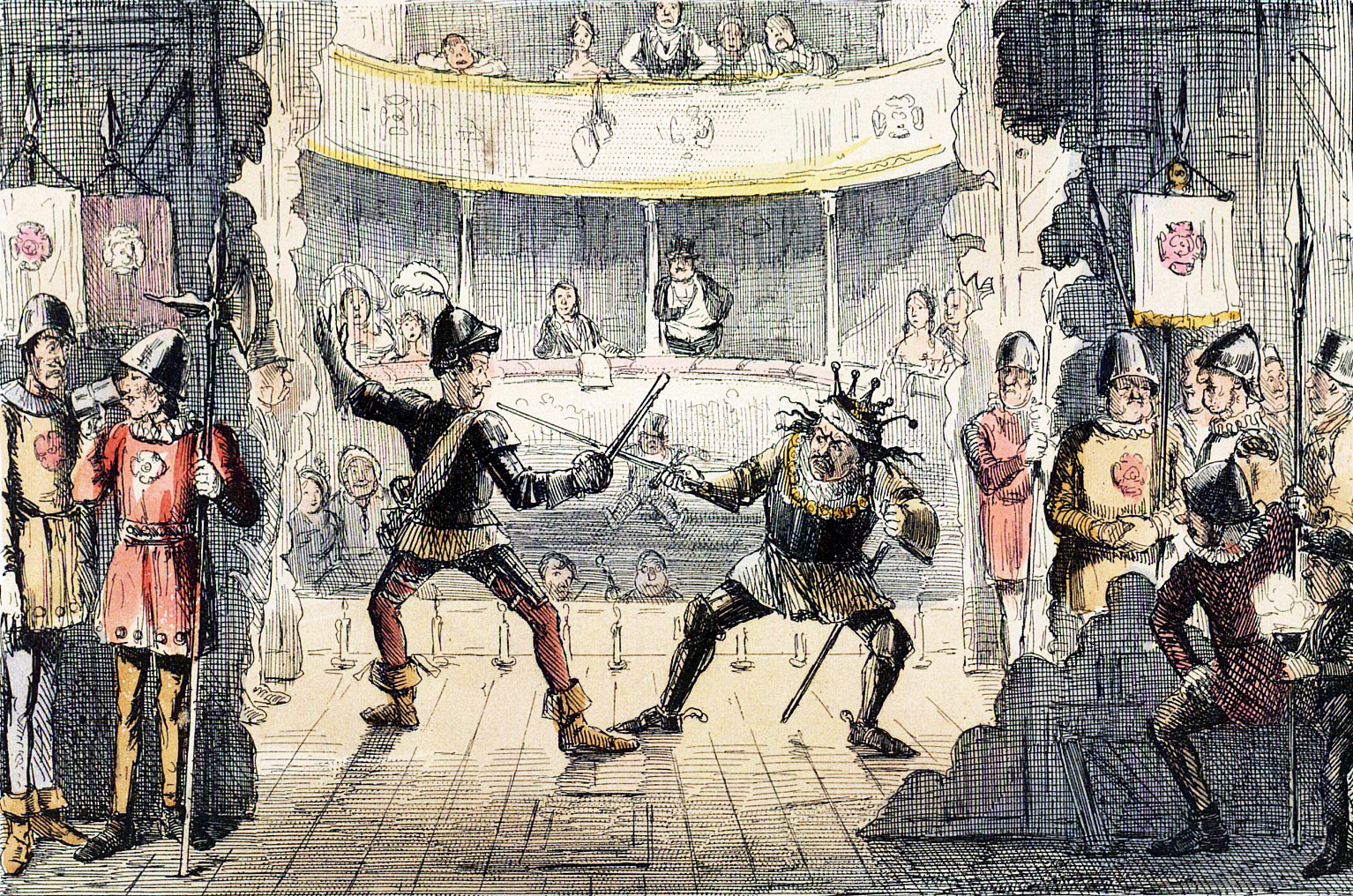
Depiction of a scene from Shakespeare's play Richard III

Drama is the specific mode of fiction represented in performance: a play, opera, mime, ballet, etc., performed in a theatre, or on radio or television. Considered as a genre of poetry in general, the dramatic mode has been contrasted with the epic and the lyrical modes ever since Aristotle's Poetics (c. 335 BC)—the earliest work of dramatic theory.

The term "drama" comes from a Greek word meaning "deed" or "act" (δρᾶμα, drâma), which is derived from "I do" (δράω, dráō). The two masks associated with drama represent the traditional generic division between comedy and tragedy.

In English (as was the analogous case in many other European languages), the word play or game (translating the Anglo-Saxon pleġan or Latin ludus) was the standard term for dramas until William Shakespeare's time—just as its creator was a play-maker rather than a dramatist and the building was a play-house rather than a theatre.

The use of "drama" in a more narrow sense to designate a specific type of play dates from the modern era. "Drama" in this sense refers to a play that is neither a comedy nor a tragedy—for example, Zola's Thérèse Raquin (1873) or Chekhov's Ivanov (1887). It is this narrower sense that the film and television industries, along with film studies, adopted to describe "drama" as a genre within their respective media. The term "radio drama" has been used in both senses—originally transmitted in a live performance. It may also be used to refer to the more high-brow and serious end of the dramatic output of radio.

The enactment of drama in theatre, performed by actors on a stage before an audience, presupposes collaborative modes of production and a collective form of reception. The structure of dramatic texts, unlike other forms of literature, is directly influenced by this collaborative production and collective reception.

Mime is a form of drama where the action of a story is told only through the movement of the body. Drama can be combined with music: the dramatic text in opera is generally sung throughout; in some ballets dance "expresses or imitates emotion, character, and narrative action." Musicals include both spoken dialogue and songs; and some forms of drama have incidental music or musical accompaniment underscoring the dialogue (melodrama and Japanese Nō, for example). Closet drama is a form that is intended to be read, rather than performed. In improvisation, the drama does not pre-exist the moment of performance; performers devise a dramatic script spontaneously before an audience.

== History of Western drama ==
=== Classical Greek drama ===
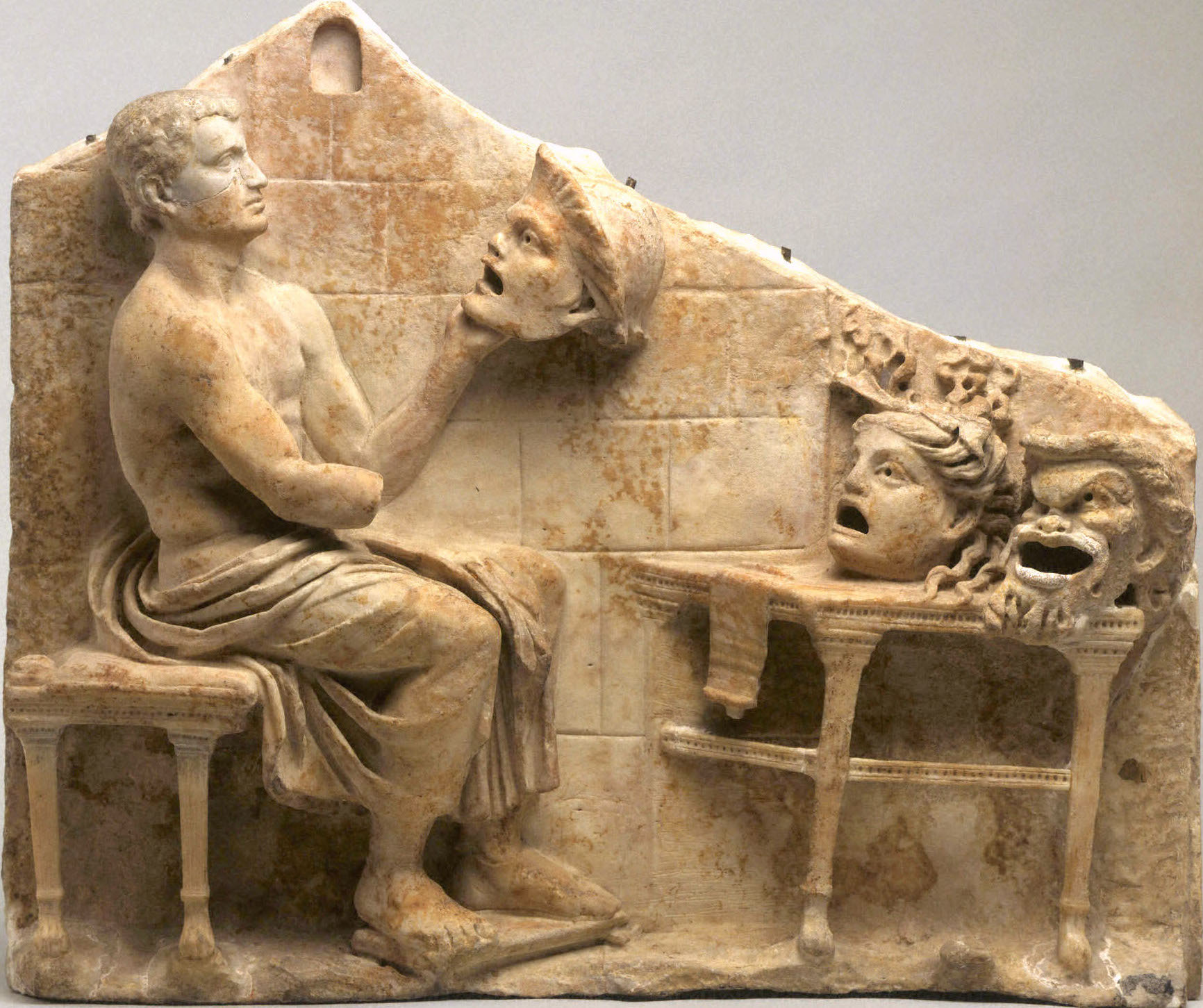
Relief of a seated poet (Menander) with masks of New Comedy, 1st century BC – early 1st century AD, Princeton University Art Museum

Western drama originates in classical Greece. The theatrical culture of the city-state of Athens produced three genres of drama: tragedy, comedy, and the satyr play. Their origins remain obscure, though by the 5th century BC, they were institutionalised in competitions held as part of festivities celebrating the god Dionysus. Historians know the names of many ancient Greek dramatists, not least Thespis, who is credited with the innovation of an actor ("hypokrites") who speaks (rather than sings) and impersonates a character (rather than speaking in his own person), while interacting with the chorus and its leader ("coryphaeus"), who were a traditional part of the performance of non-dramatic poetry (dithyrambic, lyric and epic).

Only a small fraction of the work of five dramatists, however, has survived to this day: we have a small number of complete texts by the tragedians Aeschylus, Sophocles and Euripides, and the comic writers Aristophanes and, from the late 4th century, Menander. Aeschylus' historical tragedy The Persians is the oldest surviving drama, although when it won first prize at the City Dionysia competition in 472 BC, he had been writing plays for more than 25 years. The competition ("agon") for tragedies may have begun as early as 534 BC; official records ("didaskaliai") begin from 501 BC when the satyr play was introduced. Tragic dramatists were required to present a tetralogy of plays (though the individual works were not necessarily connected by story or theme), which usually consisted of three tragedies and one satyr play (though exceptions were made, as with Euripides' Alcestis in 438 BC). Comedy was officially recognized with a prize in the competition from 487 to 486 BC.

Five comic dramatists competed at the City Dionysia (though during the Peloponnesian War this may have been reduced to three), each offering a single comedy. Ancient Greek comedy is traditionally divided between "old comedy" (5th century BC), "middle comedy" (4th century BC) and "new comedy" (late 4th century to 2nd BC).

=== Classical Roman drama ===
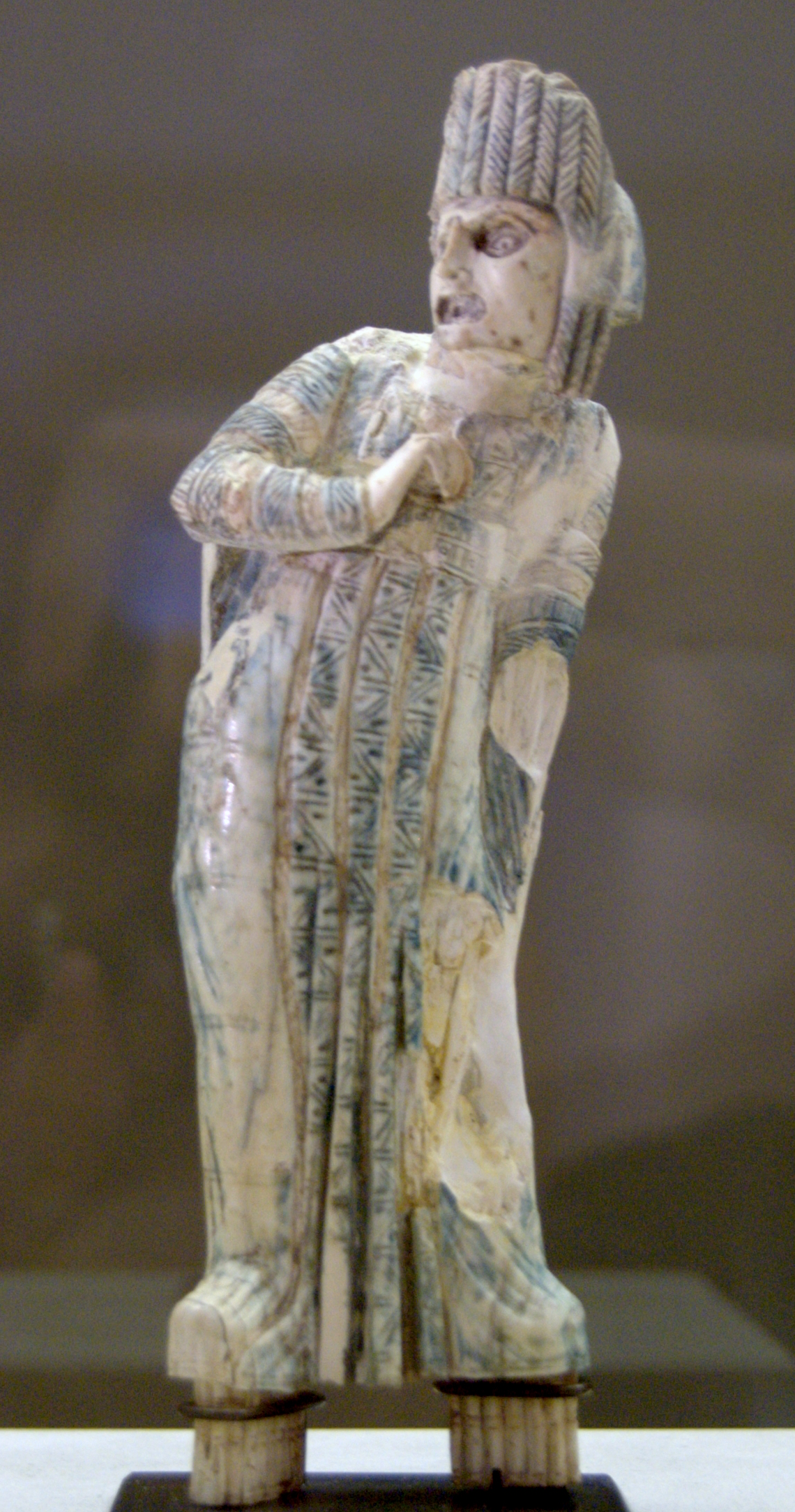
An ivory statuette of a Roman actor of tragedy, 1st century AD

Following the expansion of the Roman Republic (527–509 BC) into several Greek territories between 270 and 240 BC, Rome encountered Greek drama. From the later years of the republic and by means of the Roman Empire (27 BC–476 AD), theatre spread west across Europe, around the Mediterranean and reached England; Roman theatre was more varied, extensive and sophisticated than that of any culture before it.

While Greek drama continued to be performed throughout the Roman period, the year 240 BC marks the beginning of regular Roman drama. From the beginning of the empire, however, interest in full-length drama declined in favour of a broader variety of theatrical entertainments. The first important works of Roman literature were the tragedies and comedies that Livius Andronicus wrote from 240 BC. Five years later, Gnaeus Naevius also began to write drama. No plays from either writer have survived. While both dramatists composed in both genres, Andronicus was most appreciated for his tragedies and Naevius for his comedies; their successors tended to specialise in one or the other, which led to a separation of the subsequent development of each type of drama.

By the beginning of the 2nd century BC, drama was firmly established in Rome and a guild of writers (collegium poetarum) had been formed. The Roman comedies that have survived are all fabula palliata (comedies based on Greek subjects) and come from two dramatists: Titus Maccius Plautus (Plautus) and Publius Terentius Afer (Terence). In re-working the Greek originals, the Roman comic dramatists abolished the role of the chorus in dividing the drama into episodes and introduced musical accompaniment to its dialogue (between one-third of the dialogue in the comedies of Plautus and two-thirds in those of Terence). The action of all scenes is set in the exterior location of a street and its complications often follow from eavesdropping.

Plautus, the more popular of the two, wrote between 205 and 184 BC and twenty of his comedies survive, of which his farces are best known; he was admired for the wit of his dialogue and his use of a variety of poetic meters. All of the six comedies that Terence wrote between 166 and 160 BC have survived; the complexity of his plots, in which he often combined several Greek originals, was sometimes denounced, but his double-plots enabled a sophisticated presentation of contrasting human behaviour. No early Roman tragedy survives, though it was highly regarded in its day; historians know of three early tragedians—Quintus Ennius, Marcus Pacuvius, and Lucius Accius.

From the time of the empire, the work of two tragedians survives—one is an unknown author, while the other is the Stoic philosopher Seneca. Nine of Seneca's tragedies survive, all of which are fabula crepidata (tragedies adapted from Greek originals); his Phaedra, for example, was based on Euripides' Hippolytus. Historians do not know who wrote the only extant example of the fabula praetexta (tragedies based on Roman subjects), Octavia, but in former times it was mistakenly attributed to Seneca due to his appearance as a character in the tragedy.

=== Medieval ===
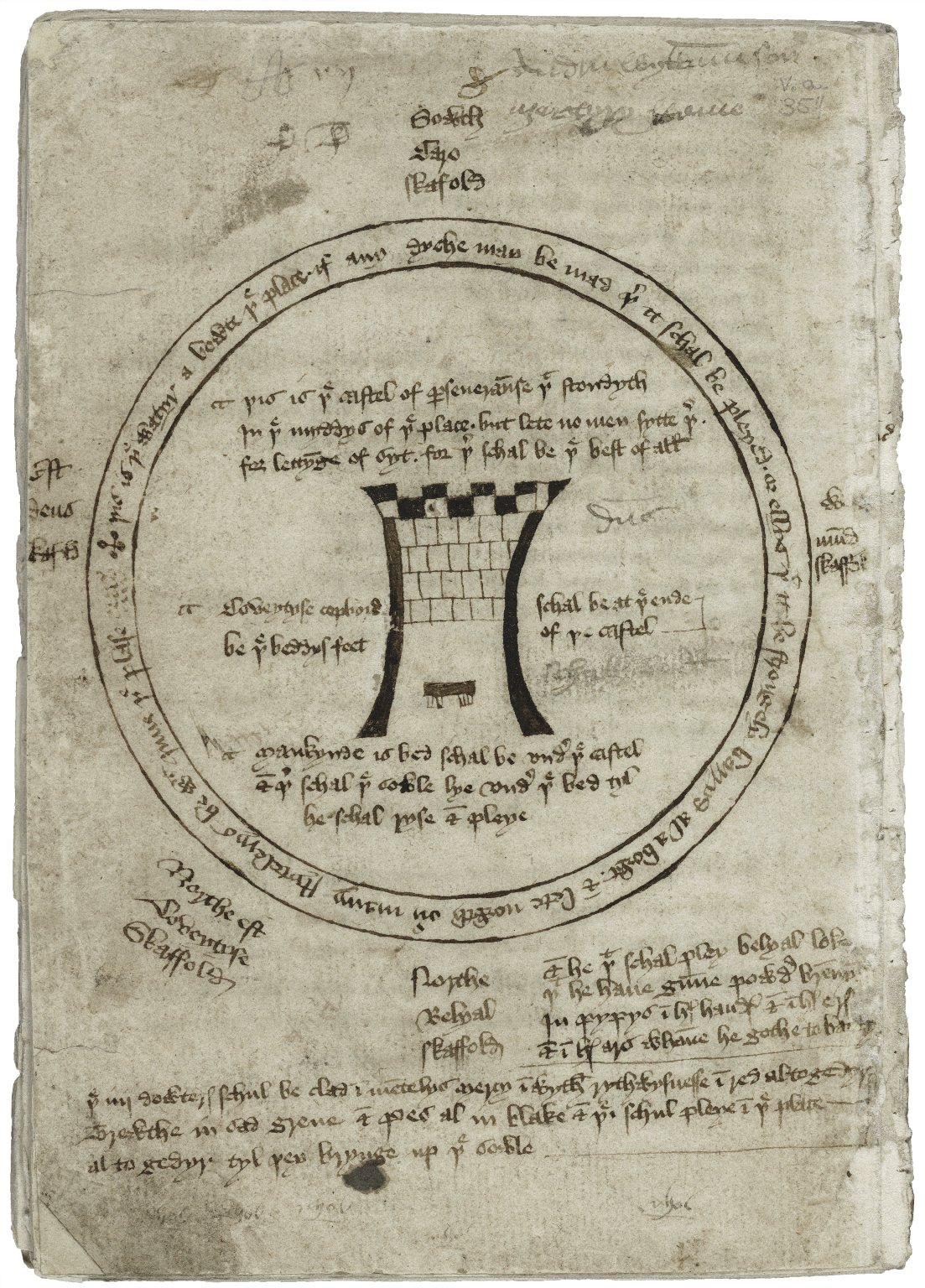
Stage drawing from a 15th-century vernacular morality play The Castle of Perseverance (as found in the Macro Manuscript)

Beginning in the early Middle Ages, churches staged dramatised versions of biblical events, known as liturgical dramas, to enliven annual celebrations. The earliest example is the Easter trope Whom do you Seek? (Quem-Quaeritis) (c. 925). Two groups would sing responsively in Latin, though no impersonation of characters was involved. By the 11th century, it had spread through Europe to Russia, Scandinavia, and Italy; excluding Islamic-era Spain.

In the 10th century, Hrosvitha wrote six plays in Latin modeled on Terence's comedies, but which treated religious subjects. Her plays are the first known to be composed by a female dramatist and the first identifiable Western drama of the post-Classical era. Later, Hildegard of Bingen wrote a musical drama, Ordo Virtutum (c. 1155).

One of the most famous of the early secular plays is the courtly pastoral Robin and Marion, written in the 13th century in French by Adam de la Halle. The Interlude of the Student and the Girl (c. 1300), one of the earliest known in English, seems to be the closest in tone and form to the contemporaneous French farces, such as The Boy and the Blind Man.

Many plays survive from France and Germany in the late Middle Ages, when some type of religious drama was performed in nearly every European country. Many of these plays contained comedy, devils, villains, and clowns. In England, trade guilds began to perform vernacular "mystery plays", which were composed of long cycles of many playlets or "pageants", of which four are extant: York (48 plays), Chester (24), Wakefield (32) and the so-called "N-Town" (42). The Second Shepherds' Play from the Wakefield cycle is a farcical story of a stolen sheep that its protagonist, Mak, tries to pass off as his new-born child asleep in a crib; it ends when the shepherds from whom he has stolen are summoned to the Nativity of Jesus.

Morality plays (a modern term) emerged as a distinct dramatic form around 1400 and flourished in the early Elizabethan era in England. Characters were often used to represent different ethical ideals. Everyman, for example, includes such figures as Good Deeds, Knowledge and Strength, and this characterisation reinforces the conflict between good and evil for the audience. The Castle of Perseverance (c. 1400–1425) depicts an archetypal figure's progress from birth through to death. Horestes (c. 1567), a late "hybrid morality" and one of the earliest examples of an English revenge play, brings together the classical story of Orestes with a Vice from the medieval allegorical tradition, alternating comic, slapstick scenes with serious, tragic ones. Also important in this period were the folk dramas of the Mummers Play, performed during the Christmas season. Court masques were particularly popular during the reign of Henry VIII.

=== Elizabethan and Jacobean ===
One of the great flowerings of drama in England occurred in the 16th and 17th centuries. Many of these plays were written in verse, particularly iambic pentameter. In addition to Shakespeare, such authors as Christopher Marlowe, Thomas Middleton, and Ben Jonson were prominent playwrights during this period. As in the medieval period, historical plays celebrated the lives of past kings, enhancing the image of the Tudor monarchy. Authors of this period drew some of their storylines from Greek mythology and Roman mythology or from the plays of eminent Roman playwrights such as Plautus and Terence.

=== English Restoration comedy ===
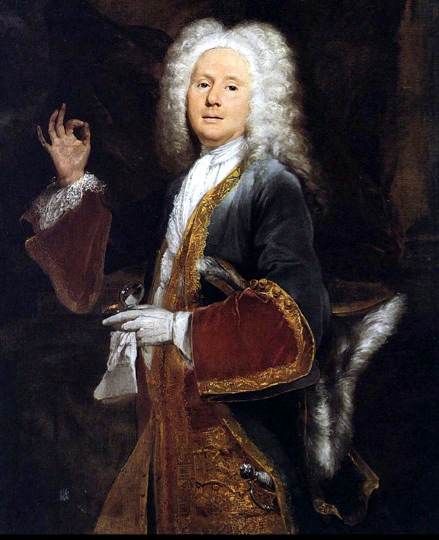
Colley Cibber as the extravagant and affected Lord Foppington, "brutal, evil, and smart", in Vanbrugh's The Relapse (1696)

Restoration comedy refers to English comedies written and performed in England during the Restoration period from 1660 to 1710. Comedy of manners is used as a synonym of Restoration comedy. After public theatre had been banned by the Puritan regime, the re-opening of the theatres in 1660 with the Restoration of Charles II signalled a renaissance of English drama. Restoration comedy is known for its sexual explicitness, urbane, cosmopolitan wit, up-to-the-minute topical writing, and crowded and bustling plots. Its dramatists stole freely from the contemporary French and Spanish stage, from English Jacobean and Caroline plays, and even from Greek and Roman classical comedies, combining the various plotlines in adventurous ways. Resulting differences of tone in a single play were appreciated rather than frowned on, as the audience prized "variety" within as well as between plays. Restoration comedy peaked twice. The genre came to spectacular maturity in the mid-1670s with an extravaganza of aristocratic comedies. Twenty lean years followed this short golden age, although the achievement of the first professional female playwright, Aphra Behn, in the 1680s is an important exception. In the mid-1690s, a brief second Restoration comedy renaissance arose, aimed at a wider audience. The comedies of the golden 1670s and 1690s peak times are significantly different from each other.

The unsentimental or "hard" comedies of John Dryden, William Wycherley, and George Etherege reflected the atmosphere at Court and celebrated with frankness an aristocratic macho lifestyle of unremitting sexual intrigue and conquest. The Earl of Rochester, real-life Restoration rake, courtier and poet, is flatteringly portrayed in Etherege's The Man of Mode (1676) as a riotous, witty, intellectual, and sexually irresistible aristocrat, a template for posterity's idea of the glamorous Restoration rake (actually never a very common character in Restoration comedy). The single play that does most to support the charge of obscenity levelled then and now at Restoration comedy is probably Wycherley's masterpiece The Country Wife (1675), whose title contains a lewd pun and whose notorious "china scene" is a series of sustained double entendres.

During the second wave of Restoration comedy in the 1690s, the "softer" comedies of William Congreve and John Vanbrugh set out to appeal to more socially diverse audience with a strong middle-class element, as well as to female spectators. The comic focus shifts from young lovers outwitting the older generation to the vicissitudes of marital relations. In Congreve's Love for Love (1695) and The Way of the World (1700), the give-and-take set pieces of couples testing their attraction for one another have mutated into witty prenuptial debates on the eve of marriage, as in the latter's famous "Proviso" scene. Vanbrugh's The Provoked Wife (1697) has a light touch and more humanly recognisable characters, while The Relapse (1696) has been admired for its throwaway wit and the characterisation of Lord Foppington, an extravagant and affected burlesque fop with a dark side. The tolerance for Restoration comedy even in its modified form was running out by the end of the 17th century, as public opinion turned to respectability and seriousness even faster than the playwrights did. At the much-anticipated all-star première in 1700 of The Way of the World, Congreve's first comedy for five years, the audience showed only moderate enthusiasm for that subtle and almost melancholy work. The comedy of sex and wit was about to be replaced by sentimental comedy and the drama of exemplary morality.

=== Modern and postmodern ===
The pivotal and innovative contributions of the 19th-century Norwegian dramatist Henrik Ibsen and the 20th-century German theatre practitioner Bertolt Brecht dominate modern drama; each inspired a tradition of imitators, which include many of the greatest playwrights of the modern era. The works of both playwrights are, in their different ways, both modernist and realist, incorporating formal experimentation, meta-theatricality, and social critique. In terms of the traditional theoretical discourse of genre, Ibsen's work has been described as the culmination of "liberal tragedy", while Brecht's has been aligned with an historicised comedy.

Other important playwrights of the modern era include Antonin Artaud, August Strindberg, Anton Chekhov, Frank Wedekind, Maurice Maeterlinck, Federico García Lorca, Eugene O'Neill, Luigi Pirandello, George Bernard Shaw, Ernst Toller, Vladimir Mayakovsky, Arthur Miller, Tennessee Williams, Jean Genet, Eugène Ionesco, Samuel Beckett, Harold Pinter, Friedrich Dürrenmatt, Dario Fo, Heiner Müller, and Caryl Churchill.

== Opera ==
Western opera is a dramatic art form that arose during the Renaissance in an attempt to revive the classical Greek drama in which dialogue, dance, and song were combined. Being strongly intertwined with western classical music, the opera has undergone enormous changes in the past four centuries and it is an important form of theatre until this day. Noteworthy is the major influence of the German 19th-century composer Richard Wagner on the opera tradition. In his view, there was no proper balance between music and theatre in the operas of his time, because the music seemed to be more important than the dramatic aspects in these works. To restore the connection with the classical drama, he entirely renewed the operatic form to emphasize the equal importance of music and drama in works that he called "music dramas".

Chinese opera has seen a more conservative development over a somewhat longer period of time.

== Pantomime ==
Pantomime (informally "panto"), is a type of musical comedy stage production, designed for family entertainment. It was developed in England and is still performed throughout the United Kingdom, generally during the Christmas and New Year season and, to a lesser extent, in other English-speaking countries. Modern pantomime includes songs, gags, slapstick comedy and dancing, employs gender-crossing actors, and combines topical humour with a story loosely based on a well-known fairy tale, fable or folk tale. It is a participatory form of theatre, in which the audience is expected to sing along with certain parts of the music and shout out phrases to the performers. Part of the appeal of amateur dramatics pantomime productions is seeing well-known local figures on stage.

These stories follow in the tradition of fables and folk tales. Usually, there is a lesson learned, and with some help from the audience, the hero/heroine saves the day. This kind of play uses stock characters seen in masque and again commedia dell'arte, these characters include the villain (doctore), the clown/servant (Arlechino/Harlequin/buttons), the lovers etc. These plays usually have an emphasis on moral dilemmas, and good always triumphs over evil, this kind of play is also very entertaining making it a very effective way of reaching many people.

Pantomime has a long theatrical history in Western culture dating back to classical theatre. It developed partly from the 16th century commedia dell'arte tradition of Italy, as well as other European and British stage traditions, such as 17th-century masques and music hall. An important part of the pantomime, until the late 19th century, was the harlequinade. Outside Britain the word "pantomime" is usually used to mean miming, rather than the theatrical form discussed here.

== Mime ==
Mime is a theatrical medium where the action of a story is told through the movement of the body, without the use of speech. Performance of mime occurred in Ancient Greece, and the word is taken from a single masked dancer called Pantomimus, although their performances were not necessarily silent. In Medieval Europe, early forms of mime, such as mummer plays and later dumbshows, evolved. In the early nineteenth century Paris, Jean-Gaspard Deburau solidified the many attributes that we have come to know in modern times, including the silent figure in whiteface.

Jacques Copeau, strongly influenced by Commedia dell'arte and Japanese Noh theatre, used masks in the training of his actors. Étienne Decroux, a pupil of his, was highly influenced by this and started exploring and developing the possibilities of mime and refined corporeal mime into a highly sculptural form, taking it outside of the realms of naturalism. Jacques Lecoq contributed significantly to the development of mime and physical theatre with his training methods.

== Ballet ==
While some ballet emphasises "the lines and patterns of movement itself" dramatic dance "expresses or imitates emotion, character, and narrative action". Such ballets are theatrical works that have characters and "tell a story", Dance movements in ballet "are often closely related to everyday forms of physical expression, [so that] there is an expressive quality inherent in nearly all dancing", and this is used to convey both action and emotions; mime is also used. Examples include Pyotr Ilyich Tchaikovsky's Swan Lake, which tells the story of Odette, a princess turned into a swan by an evil sorcerer's curse, Sergei Prokofiev's ballet Romeo and Juliet, based on Shakespeare's famous play, and Igor Stravinsky's Petrushka, which tells the story of the loves and jealousies of three puppets.

== Creative drama ==
Creative drama includes dramatic activities and games used primarily in educational settings with children. Its roots in the United States began in the early 1900s. Winifred Ward is considered to be the founder of creative drama in education, establishing the first academic use of drama in Evanston, Illinois.

== Asian drama ==
=== India ===
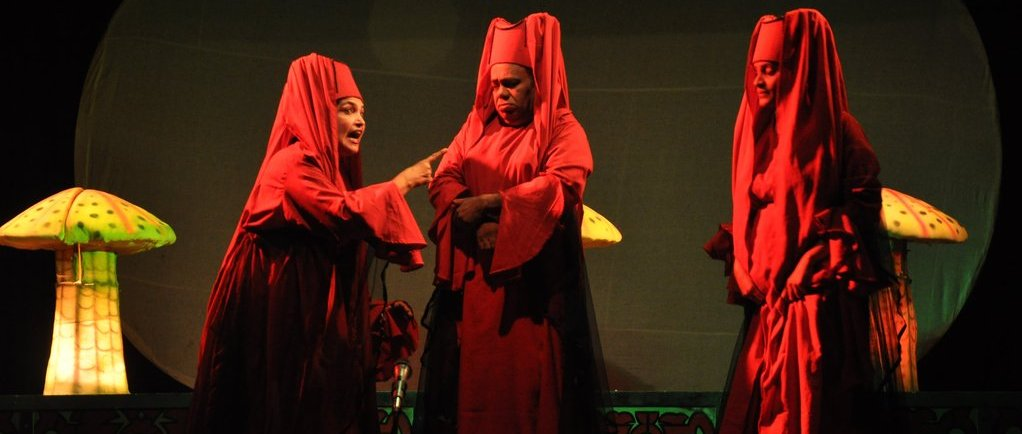
A scene from the drama Macbeth by Kalidasa Kalakendram in Kollam city, India

The earliest form of Indian drama was the Sanskrit drama. Between the 1st century AD and the 10th was a period of relative peace in the history of India during which hundreds of plays were written. With the Islamic conquests that began in the 10th and 11th centuries, theatre was discouraged or forbidden entirely. Later, in an attempt to re-assert indigenous values and ideas, village theatre was encouraged across the subcontinent, developing in various regional languages from the 15th to the 19th centuries. The Bhakti movement was influential in performances in several regions. Apart from regional languages, Assam saw the rise of Vaishnavite drama in an artificially mixed literary language called Brajavali. A distinct form of one-act plays called Ankia Naat developed in the works of Sankardev, a particular presentation of which is called Bhaona. Modern Indian theatre developed during the period of colonial rule under the British Empire, from the mid-19th century until the mid-20th.

==== Sanskrit theatre ====
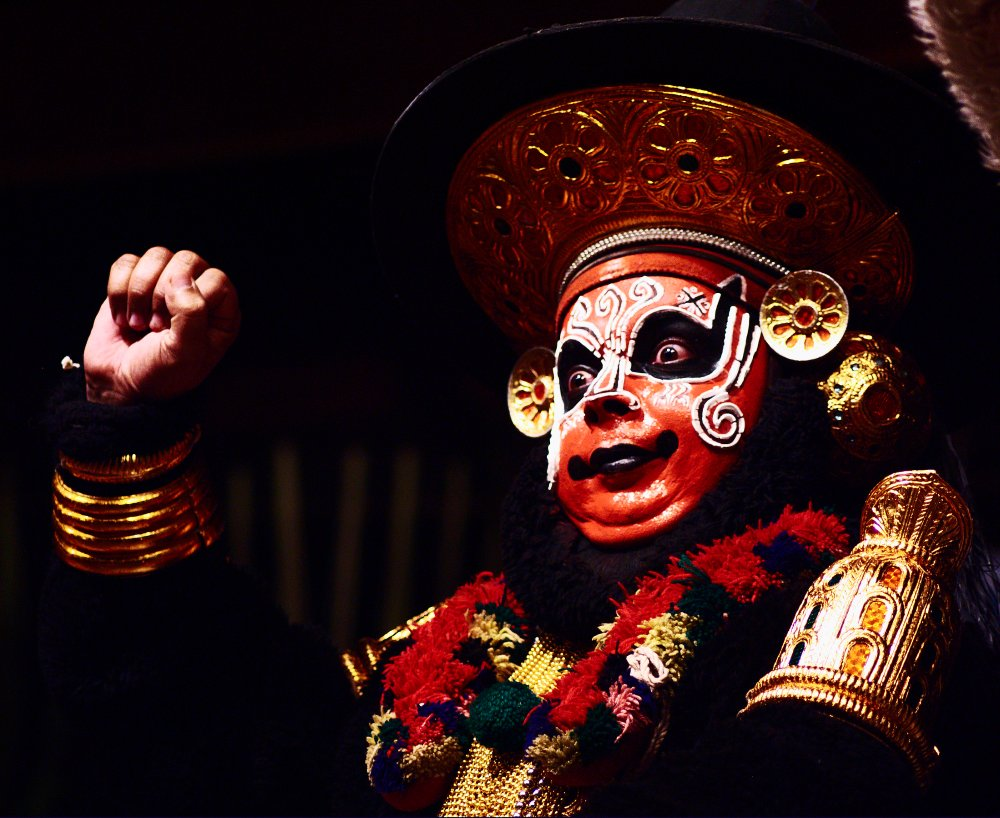
Performer playing Sugriva in the Koodiyattam form of Sanskrit theatre

The earliest-surviving fragments of Sanskrit drama date from the 1st century AD. The wealth of archeological evidence from earlier periods offers no indication of the existence of a tradition of theatre. The ancient Vedas (hymns from between 1500 and 1000 BC that are among the earliest examples of literature in the world) contain no hint of it (although a small number are composed in a form of dialogue) and the rituals of the Vedic period do not appear to have developed into theatre. The Mahābhāṣya by Patañjali contains the earliest reference to what may have been the seeds of Sanskrit drama. This treatise on grammar from 140 BC provides a feasible date for the beginnings of theatre in India.

The major source of evidence for Sanskrit theatre is A Treatise on Theatre (Nātyaśāstra), a compendium whose date of composition is uncertain (estimates range from 200 BC to 200 AD) and whose authorship is attributed to Bharata Muni. The Treatise is the most complete work of dramaturgy in the ancient world. It addresses acting, dance, music, dramatic construction, architecture, costuming, make-up, props, the organisation of companies, the audience, competitions, and offers a mythological account of the origin of theatre.

Its drama is regarded as the highest achievement of Sanskrit literature. It utilised stock characters, such as the hero (nayaka), heroine (nayika), or clown (vidusaka). Actors may have specialised in a particular type. It was patronized by the kings as well as village assemblies. Famous early playwrights include Bhasa, Kalidasa (famous for Urvashi, Won by Valour, Malavika and Agnimitra, and The Recognition of Shakuntala), Śudraka (famous for The Little Clay Cart), Asvaghosa, Daṇḍin, and Emperor Harsha (famous for Nagananda, Ratnavali, and Priyadarsika). Śakuntalā (in English translation) influenced Goethe's Faust (1808–1832).

==== Mobile theatre ====
A distinct form of theatre has developed in India where the entire crew travels performing plays from place to place, with makeshift stages and equipment, particularly in the eastern parts of the country. Jatra (Bengali for "travel"), originating in the Vaishnavite movement of Chaitanya Mahaprabhu in Bengal, is a tradition that follows this format. Vaishnavite plays in the neighbouring state of Assam, pioneered by Srimanta Sankardeva, takes the forms of Ankia Naat and Bhaona. These, along with Western influences, have inspired the development of modern mobile theatre, known in Assamese as Bhramyoman, in Assam. Modern Bhramyoman stages everything from Hindu mythology to adaptations of Western classics and Hollywood movies, and make use of modern techniques, such as live visual effects. Assamese mobile theatre is estimated to be an industry worth a hundred million. The self-contained nature of Bhramyoman, with all equipment and even the stage being carried by the troop itself, allows staging shows even in remote villages, giving wider reach. Pioneers of this industry include Achyut Lahkar and Brajanath Sarma.

==== Modern Indian drama ====
Rabindranath Tagore was a pioneering modern playwright who wrote plays noted for their exploration and questioning of nationalism, identity, spiritualism and material greed. His plays are written in Bengali and include Chitra (Chitrangada, 1892), The King of the Dark Chamber (Raja, 1910), The Post Office (Dakghar, 1913), and Red Oleander (Raktakarabi, 1924). Girish Karnad is a noted playwright, who has written a number of plays that use history and mythology, to critique and problematize ideas and ideals that are of contemporary relevance. Karnad's numerous plays such as Tughlaq, Hayavadana, Taledanda, and Naga-Mandala are significant contributions to Indian drama. Vijay Tendulkar and Mahesh Dattani are amongst the major Indian playwrights of the 20th century. Mohan Rakesh in Hindi and Danish Iqbal in Urdu are considered architects of new age Drama. Mohan Rakesh's Aadhe Adhoore and Danish Iqbal's Dara Shikoh are considered modern classics.

=== China ===
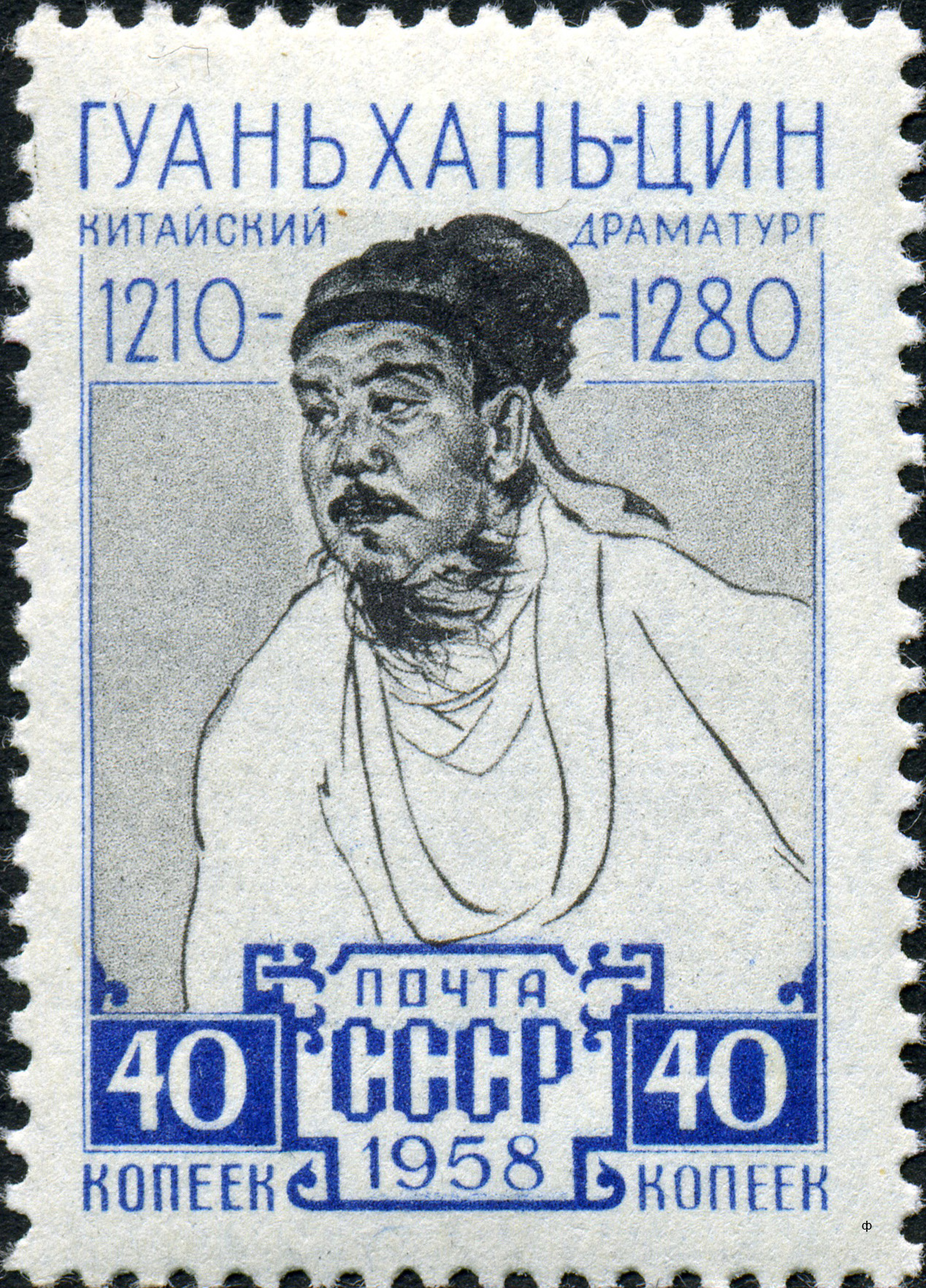
A 1958 U.S.S.R. postage stamp commemorating Guan Hanqing, one of the great Chinese dramatists, who is renowned for his "zaju" plays

Chinese theatre has a long and complex history. Today it is often called Chinese opera although this normally refers specifically to the popular form known as Beijing opera and Kunqu; there have been many other forms of theatre in China, such as zaju.

=== Japan ===
Japanese Nō drama is a serious dramatic form that combines drama, music, and dance into a complete aesthetic performance experience. It developed in the 14th and 15th centuries and has its own musical instruments and performance techniques, which were often handed down from father to son. The performers were generally male (for both male and female roles), although female amateurs also perform Nō dramas. Nō drama was supported by the government, and particularly the military, with many military commanders having their own troupes and sometimes performing themselves. It is still performed in Japan today.

Kyōgen is the comic counterpart to Nō drama. It concentrates more on dialogue and less on music, although Nō instrumentalists sometimes appear also in Kyōgen. Kabuki drama, developed from the 17th century, is another comic form, which includes dance.

Modern theatrical and musical drama has also developed in Japan in forms such as shingeki and the Takarazuka Revue.

== See also ==
- Antitheatricality
- Applied Drama
- Augustan drama
- Christian drama
- Closet drama
- Comedy drama
- Costume drama
- Crime drama
- Domestic drama
- Drama school
- Dramatic structure
- Dramatic theory
- Drama annotation
- Dramaturgy
- Entertainment
- Flash drama
- Folk play
- Heroic drama
- History of theatre
- Hyperdrama
- Legal drama
- Medical drama
- Melodrama
- Monodrama
- Mystery play
- One act play
- Political drama
- Soap opera
- Theatre awards
- Two-hander
- Verse drama and dramatic verse
- Well-made play
- Yakshagana

== Bibliography ==
- Banham, Martin, ed. 1998. The Cambridge Guide to Theatre. Cambridge: Cambridge University Press. ISBN 0-521-43437-8.
- Baumer, Rachel Van M., and James R. Brandon, eds. 1981. Sanskrit Theatre in Performance. Delhi: Motilal Banarsidass, 1993. ISBN 978-81-208-0772-3.
- Bevington, David M. 1962. From Mankind to Marlowe: Growth of Structure in the Popular Drama of Tudor England. Cambridge, MA: Harvard University Press.
- Bhatta, S. Krishna. 1987. Indian English Drama: A Critical Study. New Delhi: Sterling.
- Brandon, James R. 1981. Introduction. In Baumer and Brandon (1981, xvii–xx).
- Brandon, James R., ed. 1997. The Cambridge Guide to Asian Theatre.' 2nd, rev. ed. Cambridge: Cambridge UP. ISBN 978-0-521-58822-5.
- Brockett, Oscar G. and Franklin J. Hildy. 2003. History of the Theatre. Ninth edition, International edition. Boston: Allyn and Bacon. ISBN 0-205-41050-2.
- Brown, Andrew. 1998. "Ancient Greece." In The Cambridge Guide to Theatre. Ed. Martin Banham. Cambridge: Cambridge UP. 441–447. ISBN 0-521-43437-8.
- Burt, Daniel S. 2008.The Drama 100: A Ranking of the Greatest Plays of All Time. Facts on File ser. New York: Facts on File/Infobase. ISBN 978-0-8160-6073-3.
- Callery, Dympha. 2001. Through the Body: A Practical Guide to Physical Theatre. London: Nick Hern. ISBN 1-854-59630-6.
- Carlson, Marvin. 1993. Theories of the Theatre: A Historical and Critical Survey from the Greeks to the Present. Expanded ed. Ithaca and London: Cornell University Press. ISBN 978-0-8014-8154-3.
- Cartledge, Paul. 1997. "'Deep Plays': Theatre as Process in Greek Civic Life." In Easterling (1997c, 3–35).
- Chakraborty, Kaustav, ed. 2011. Indian English Drama. New Delhi: PHI Learning.
- Deshpande, G. P., ed. 2000. Modern Indian Drama: An Anthology. New Delhi: Sahitya Akedemi.
- Dillon, Janette. 2006. The Cambridge Introduction to Early English Theatre. Cambridge Introductions to Literature ser. Cambridge: Cambridge University Press. ISBN 978-0-521-83474-2.
- Duchartre, Pierre Louis. 1929. The Italian Comedy. Unabridged republication. New York: Dover, 1966. ISBN 0-486-21679-9.
- Dukore, Bernard F., ed. 1974. Dramatic Theory and Criticism: Greeks to . Florence, Kentucky: Heinle & Heinle. ISBN 0-03-091152-4.
- Durant, Will & Ariel Durant. 1963 The Story of Civilization, Volume II: The Life of Greece. 11 vols. New York: Simon & Schuster.
- Easterling, P. E. 1997a. "A Show for Dionysus." In Easterling (1997c, 36–53).
- Easterling, P. E. 1997b. "Form and Performance." In Easterling (1997c, 151–177).
- Easterling, P. E., ed. 1997c. The Cambridge Companion to Greek Tragedy. Cambridge Companions to Literature ser. Cambridge: Cambridge UP. ISBN 0-521-42351-1.
- Ehrlich, Harriet W. 1974. "Creative Dramatics as a Classroom Teaching Technique." Elementary English 51:1 (January):75–80.
- Elam, Keir. 1980. The Semiotics of Theatre and Drama. New Accents Ser. London and New York: Methuen. ISBN 0-416-72060-9.
- Fergusson, Francis. 1949. The Idea of a Theater: A Study of Ten Plays, The Art of Drama in a Changing Perspective. Princeton, New Jersey: Princeton UP, 1968. ISBN 0-691-01288-1.
- Goldhill, Simon. 1997. "The Audience of Athenian Tragedy." In Easterling (1997c, 54–68).
- Gordon, Mel. 1983. Lazzi: The Comic Routines of the Commedia dell'Arte. New York: Performing Arts Journal Publications. ISBN 0-933826-69-9.
- Gutzwiller, Kathryn. 2007. A Guide to Hellenistic Literature. London: Blackwell. ISBN 0-631-23322-9.
- Harsh, Philip Whaley. 1944. A Handbook of Classical Drama. Stanford: Stanford UP; Oxford: Oxford UP.
- Johnstone, Keith. 1981. Impro: Improvisation and the Theatre Rev. ed. London: Methuen, 2007. ISBN 0-7136-8701-0.
- Ley, Graham. 2006. A Short Introduction to the Ancient Greek Theater. Rev. ed. Chicago and London: U of Chicago P. ISBN 0-226-47761-4.
- Neog, Maheswar (1980). Early History of the Vaiṣṇava Faith and Movement in Assam: Śaṅkaradeva and His Times. Motilal Banarsidass Publishers. ISBN 978-81-208-0007-6.
- O'Brien, Nick. 2010. Stanislavski In Practise. London: Routledge. ISBN 978-0415568432.
- O'Brien, Nick. 2007. The Theatricality of Greek Tragedy: Playing Space and Chorus. Chicago and London: U of Chicago P. ISBN 0-226-47757-6.
- Pandey, Sudhakar, and Freya Taraporewala, eds. 1999. Studies in Contemporary India. New Delhi: Prestige.
- Pfister, Manfred. 1977. The Theory and Analysis of Drama. Trans. John Halliday. European Studies in English Literature Ser. Cambridige: Cambridge University Press, 1988. ISBN 0-521-42383-X.
- Rémy, Tristan. 1954. Jean-Gaspard Deburau. Paris: L’Arche.
- Rehm, Rush. 1992. Greek Tragic Theatre. Theatre Production Studies ser. London and New York: Routledge. ISBN 0-415-11894-8.
- Richmond, Farley. 1998. "India." In Banham (1998, 516–525).
- Richmond, Farley P., Darius L. Swann, and Phillip B. Zarrilli, eds. 1993. Indian Theatre: Traditions of Performance. U of Hawaii P. ISBN 978-0-8248-1322-2.
- Spivack, Bernard. 1958. Shakespeare and the Allegory of Evil: The History of a Metaphor in Relation to his Major Villains. NY and London: Columbia UP. ISBN 0-231-01912-2.
- Spolin, Viola. 1967. Improvisation for the Theater. Third rev. ed Evanston, II Northwestern University Press, 1999. ISBN 0-8101-4008-X.
- Taxidou, Olga. 2004. Tragedy, Modernity and Mourning. Edinburgh: Edinburgh UP. ISBN 0-7486-1987-9.
- Wickham, Glynne. 1959. Early English Stages: 1300–1660. Vol. 1. London: Routledge.
- Wickham, Glynne. 1969. Shakespeare's Dramatic Heritage: Collected Studies in Mediaeval, Tudor and Shakespearean Drama. London: Routledge. ISBN 0-710-06069-6.
- Wickham, Glynne, ed. 1976. English Moral Interludes. London: Dent. ISBN 0-874-71766-3.
- Wickham, Glynne. 1981. Early English Stages: 1300–1660. Vol. 3. London: Routledge. ISBN 0-710-00218-1.
- Wickham, Glynne. 1987. The Medieval Theatre. 3rd ed. Cambridge: Cambridge University Press. ISBN 0-521-31248-5.
- Weimann, Robert. 1978. Shakespeare and the Popular Tradition in the Theater: Studies in the Social Dimension of Dramatic Form and Function. Baltimore and London: The Johns Hopkins University Press. ISBN 0-8018-3506-2.
- Weimann, Robert. 2000. Author's Pen and Actor's Voice: Playing and Writing in Shakespeare's Theatre. Ed. Helen Higbee and William West. Cambridge Studies in Renaissance Literature and Culture. Cambridge: Cambridge University Press. ISBN 0-521-78735-1.
