= Aibheti, Nagaon =

Aibheti
- Interactive map of Aibheti
- Coordinates: 26°22′26.4″N 92°35′42.0″E
- Country: India

Aibheti is a village situated in the western part of Nagaon district in Assam State, India.

Aibheti is 12 km from Nagaon town. According to the 2011 census 491 families with a total population of 2111 people live there; a major portion of the population are involved with cultivation, with a few are engaged in government services and business.

A special landmark is Mahapurush Srimanta Sankardev's granddaughter- in-law Ai kanaklata (ailakhi) Than (Temple). There is a short history about the name of Aibheti. In 1656 Prophet Srimanta Sankardev's grand daughter-in-law Aikanaklata came to search for her grandfather Srimanta Sankardev's birthplace "Bordowa (Batadrava)" . She stayed there and from that time this place was known as "Aibheti".
