= Bordowa Than =

Hindu pilgrimage site in Assam

- Batadrava Than
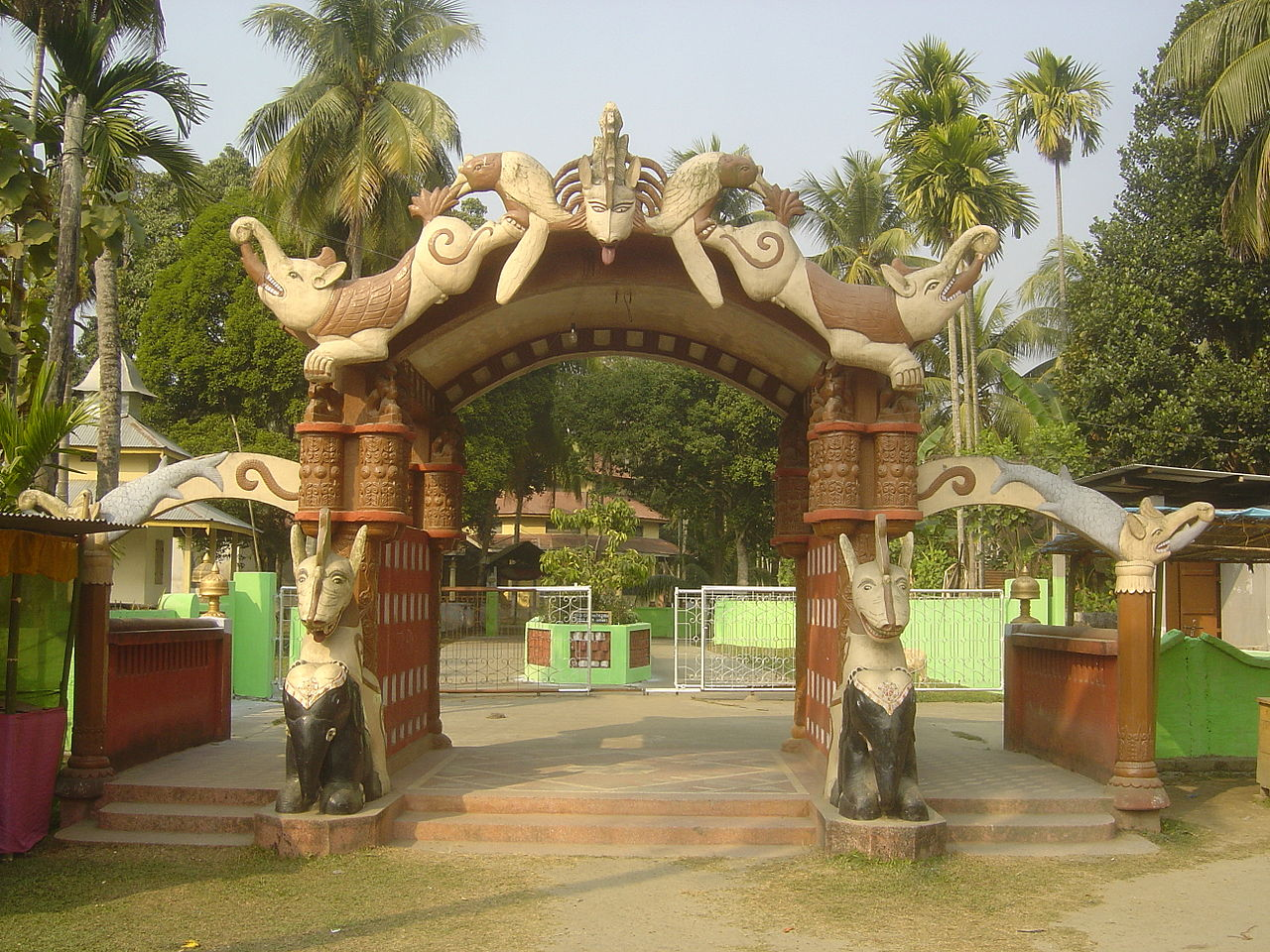

Religion
- Affiliation: Hinduism
- District: Nagaon
- Festivals: Doul jatra, Sankardev Utsav, Janmashtami, Nandotsava, Phalgustsava, Ras Jatra, etc.

Location
- Location: Batadrava
- State: Assam
- Country: India
- Interactive map of Bordowa Than

Architecture
- Creator: Sankardev
- Established: 1468

Specifications
- Site area: 16 bigha
- Temple: 4

Website
- https://bordowathan.org/

Bordowa 'Batadrava' Than is a pilgrimage site in Nagaon, Assam. It is located in the birthplace of the great Assamese saint and social reformer Srimanta Sankardev. Sankardev at the age of 19, established the Bordowa Than in 1468, it is also the first Namghar or Than constructed. The rituals of this Than is conducted according to the norms of Purush sanghati. The pilgrimage site is located at Batadrava, about 16 km from Nagaon city and it covers an area of 16 bigha.

== Establishment ==
Srimanta Sankardev constructed a prayer house (Namghar) and chari hati (huts of devotees), where daily recitals of prayer and discussion could be held at the request of his brother Ram Raiya. From here Sankardev propagated the teachings of Ekasarana Dharma till the age of 67, after this due to disturbances created by the neighboring tribes and Kachari King, he abandoned this place. After his abandonment, this place became deserted and it was finally re-discovered by the granddaughter-in-law Kanaklata.

=== Dispute ===
Bordowa Than has a long history of dispute over its claims of ownership and it was divided into two Satras, namely, Narowa and Salaguri. In the reign of Ahom King Kamaleswar Singha, its case of dispute reached the court and he sent his ministers Purnananda Burhagohain and Bhandari Borbarua to settle the disputes and in conclusion the Than was equally divided between both. But in 1958, it was reunified and both the former Satras were combined under the banner of 'Bordowa Than', and one big Namghar was created.

== Structure ==
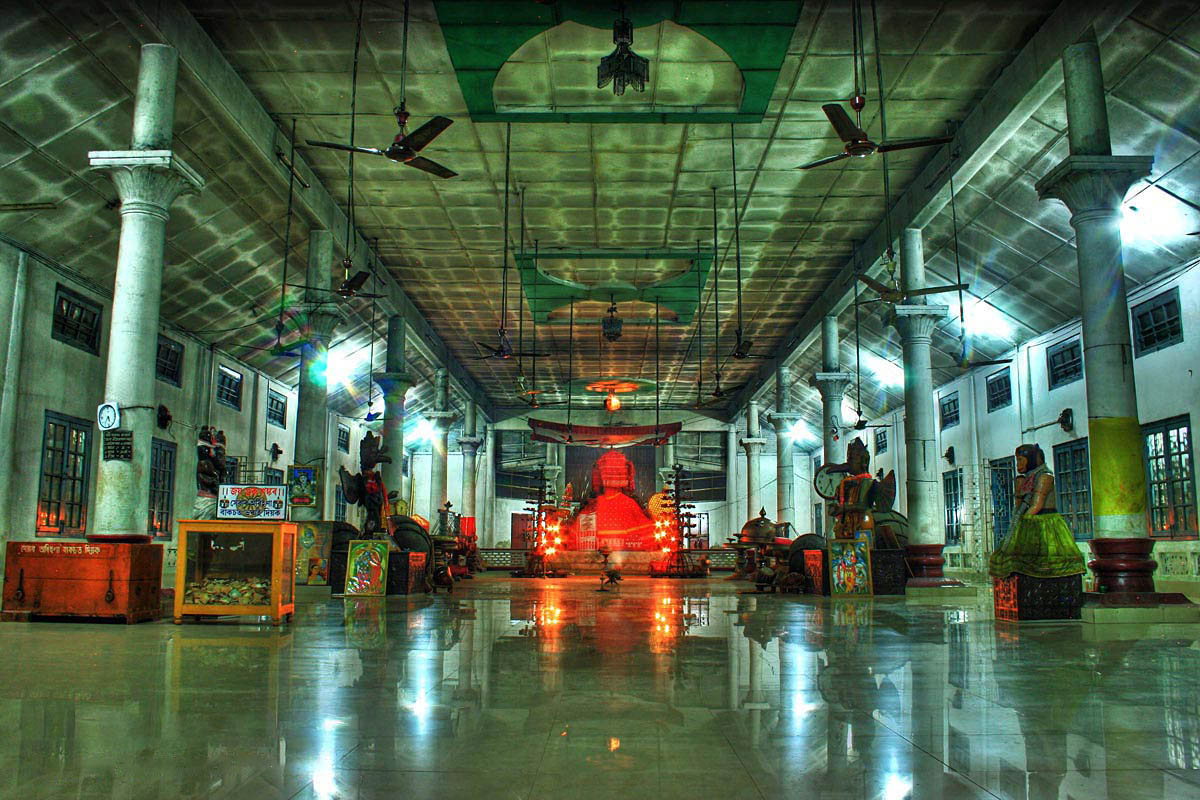
Inside the Bordowa Kirtanghar premise.

The Than covers an area of 16 bigha and is surrounded by a brick wall. It has two entrances (batchora).

Kirtan Ghar: The spacious prayer house or Kirtan ghar is situated in the middle of the than premise. It was originally built by Sankardev with impermanent materials and the present structure was built in 1958, measuring 180 ft. long and 85 ft. breadth.

Manikut: Manikut is attached to the Kirtan ghar and the sacred texts, scriptures, and manuscripts are kept there.

The other structures lying within the campus are: Natghar, Alohighar, Sabhaghar, Rabhaghar, Hatipukhuri, Aakashi Ganga, Doul mandir etc. There is also one mini museum, which displays various kinds of historical articles of the Than.

== Management ==
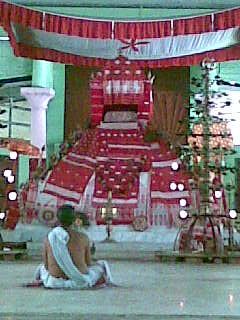
Singhasan (seven tired throne) where the Bhagavata is placed

For the smooth functioning the Than's rituals and prayers, the Sattradhikar (head of the (Than) Satra) appoints a number of functionaries such as: (i) Bar Bhagavati, (ii) Bar pathak, (iii) Bar Namlogowa, (iv) Deuri, (v) Bar Bharali, (vi) Bar aldhara, (vii) Bar Gayana (viii) Bar Bayana, the chief instrumentalist (ix) Chaul Bharali, (x) Bar Sarvani, (xi) Oja.

=== List of Sattradhikar ===
The Sattradhikar is the head of the (Than) Satra. Following is the list of the Sattradhikars of the Narowa and Salaguri Satras.

Narowa Sattradhikar

1. Ram Deva
2. Bhadra Deva
3. Lakshmi Deva
4. Ram Deva
5. Bhagirati
6. Bangshi Deva
7. Puma Chandra Deva Goswami
8. Devananda Devagoswami

Salaguri Sattradhikar

1. Ram Carana
2. Krishnakanta
3. Bhadra Kanta
4. Yadu Kanta
5. Pumakanta
6. Nabakanta
7. Bhogeswar
8. Leeladhar
9. Dharma Chandra
10. Bhava Chandra
11. Arabinda
12. Sumeswar Deva
13. Paramananda Mahanta

== Functions ==
The Than organizes various kinds of functions and festivals here such as the tithis or the death anniversaries of the Vaisnava saints, Srimanta Sankardev and Mahapurush Madhavdev, Janmastami, Nandotsava, Phalgustsava, Ras Jatra ceremonies, etc. and performance of Sattriya culture.

== Avirbhav Kshetra ==
Mahapurush Srimanta Sankardev Avirbhav Kshetra is a cultural, spiritual, and heritage complex located at Batadrava near Bordowa Than in Nagaon district, in the Indian state of Assam. It has been developed around the birthplace of the medieval Assamese saint and reformer Srimanta Sankardev, commemorating his life, teachings, and contributions to Assamese society through religion, arts, and culture. The site was officially inaugurated on 29 December 2025 by Union Home Minister Amit Shah after an extensive redevelopment project aimed at transforming it into a major cultural and spiritual destination.
