= Karatala Kamala Kamala Dala Nayana =

Poem by Sankardeva

Karatala Kamala Kamala Dala Nayana (Assamese: কৰতল কমল কমল দল নয়ন, "Thy palm is like the lotus; Thine eyes are like the lotus petals.") is a devotional poem by Srimanta Sankardeva of Assam.

== Writing ==
This poem is of great significance as it is one of the first writings by Sankardeva, whose works later on brought about the widely affecting Vaishnavite movement in Assam.

This poem was written by Sankardeva just after learning the Swarabarnas and the Byanjanbarnas. Any vowel sound (except অ, i.e. o) following a consonant sound in a word in Assamese is denoted by a swarasihna, but it goes that since Sankardeva had not learnt them by the time of writing Karatala Kamala, the poem contains no swarasihnas. Sankardeva wrote the poem when he was of the age of 12 years.

== Lyrics ==
=== In Assamese script ===
কৰতল কমল কমল দল নয়ন।
ভব দব দহন গহন-বন শয়ন ॥
নপৰ নপৰ পৰ সতৰত গময়।
সভয় মভয় ভয় মমহৰ সততয়॥
খৰতৰ বৰ শৰ হত দশ বদন।
খগচৰ নগধৰ ফনধৰ শয়ন॥
জগদঘ মপহৰ ভৱ ভয় তৰণ।
পৰ পদ লয় কৰ কমলজ নয়ন॥

=== In Latin script ===
Karatala kamala kamaladala nayana |
Bhavadava dahana gahana vana sayana ||
Napara napara para satarata gamaya |
Sabhaya mabhaya bhaya mamahara satataya ||
Kharatara varasara hatadasa vadana |
Khagachara nagadhara fanadhara sayana ||
Jagadagha mapahara bhavabhaya tarana |
Parapada layakara kamalaja nayana ||

=== English translation ===
LOTUS IN THINE PALM

Behold I the lotus in thine palms,

Lotus petal-like thy paired eye curves,

O extinguisher of all worldly pain,

O serene reposer in slumber garden!

Thou art -- from me -- never apart,

O ye super ego hiding in abyss!

Forever thou dost clear -- anxieties and fear,

Giveth me solace and peace.

O the wielder of weapons potent and swift,

O the slayer of ten-headed demon in conflict,

O the rider of Garuda the giant,

O the lifter of Govardhana the mount,

Thou art shielded in thine eternal rest

By Shesha the coiling hooded serpent.

O my saviour from earthly strings,

O the dispeller of worldly sins,

I pray thee, O the lotus-eyed one,

O the giver of ultimate bliss.
