= Dihanaam =

Congregational prayer to the Assamese saint Sankardev

Dihanam performed by the Milijuli Khadoichuk Dhinam Group from Jamugurihat, Sonitpur, Assam.

Dihanaam is a type of congregational prayer sung by women in Assam in praise of the Assamese saint Sankardev. Instruments like the Negera, taal, khol and also hand-clapping is used in it. The lyrics of Dihanam are primarily derived from Vaishnava scriptures including the Kirtan Ghosha, Nam Ghosha, and Borgeet. Over time, Dihanam has evolved from its early roots in the Ekasarana tradition, and contemporary practice includes both traditional renditions in religious congregations and modern interpretations in cultural events. The songs are sung in call and response style.
