= Brajavali dialect =

Literary language of India

Brajavali
- ব্ৰজাৱলী
- Region: India
- Extinct: unknown
- Language family: Indo-European: Indo-Iranian; Indo-Aryan; Eastern Zone (Magadhan); Assamese and Maithili; Brajavali
- Writing system: Assamese

Language codes
- ISO 639-3: None (mis)
- Glottolog: None

Brajavali (Assamese: ব্ৰজাৱলী; romanized: Brôzawôli) was a literary language used by Sankardev (1449–1568) for some of his compositions (Borgeets and Ankia Naats) in the context of his Vaishnavite religion, Ekasarana Dharma, in Assam. Though similar languages were used in the Vaishnavite contexts in Odisha and Bengal, the one used in Assam was different, as it was based on Maithili (and not Brajbhasa), to which Assamese is added and the native pronunciation overrides the original pronunciation of Maithili. In general, the vocables and idiomatic expressions of Brajavali were local (Assamese), while the inflectional forms were Maithili, easily understood by the people of Assam but carrying the flavor of Brajbhasa, the language of choice of the Bhakti poets.

== See also ==
- Brajabuli – another literary language based on Maithili
