= Kirtan Ghosha =

Collection of poetic works by Srimanta Sankardev

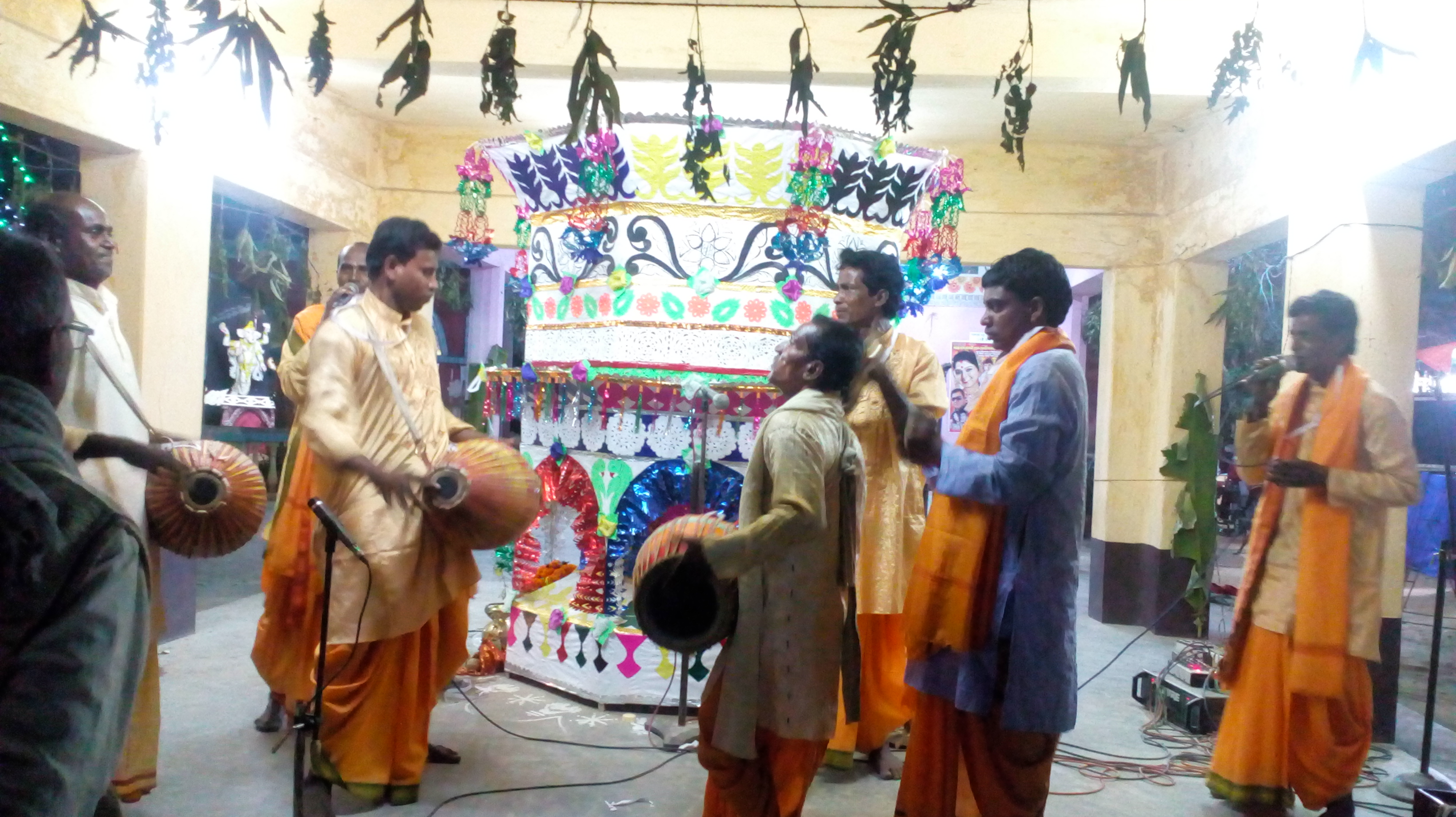

The Kirtan Ghosha (Assamese: [kiɹ.tɔn.ɡʱʊ.xa]) is a collection of poetical works, primarily composed by the medieval saint Srimanta Sankardev in the Brajavali language. It was meant for community singing in the Ekasarana sect. Its importance in the religion is second only to the primary text, the Bhagavat of Sankardeva.

== Textual history ==
The text of the kirtan ghoxa consists of twenty six sections and thirty one kirtans (or narratives of Krishna). Sankardev had instructed Madhabdev during his last visit to Patbausi to compile the kirtans that were scattered then at different places—and they were posthumously compiled into a single text by Ramcharan Thakur, the nephew of Madhabdev. All the kirtans were composed by Srimanta Sankardeva, except for one by Ratnakar Kandali and another by Madhabdeva. Two of Sankardeva's kirtans were later additions to Ramcharan Thakur's compilation. In some versions, there is an additional kirtan composed by Sridhar Kandali.

== Textual description ==
Each kirtan consists of a ghoxa or refrain followed by a number of verses, called padas, written in different meters. Some of the meters used, with examples

namo goparupi meghasama syama tanu |
gawe pitvastra hate singa veta venu ||

=== Jhuna ===
pitavastra sobhe syamala kaya |
tadita jadita jalada praya ||

=== Laghu payara ===
sundara hasikaka alpa hasa |
caru syama tanu pitabasa ||

=== Dulari ===
pache trinayana divya upavana
dekhilanta vidyamana |
phala phala dhari jakamaka kari
ache yata vriksamana ||

=== Chabi ===
hena maha divyavana dekhilanta trinayana
divya kanya eka ache tate |
koti lakshmi sama nohe katashe trailokya mohe
bhanta kheri kheli duyo hate ||

== The Kirtans history ==
1. Chaturvimsati avatara varnana
2. Pasanda mardana
3. Namaparadha
4. Dhyana Varnana
5. Ajamilopakhyana
6. Prahlada carita
7. Haramohana
8. Balichalana
9. Gajendropakhyana
10. Sisulila
11. Rasa krida
12. Kamsa vadha
13. Gopi udhava samvada
14. Kujir vancha purana
15. Akrurar vancha purana
16. Jarasandhar yuddha
17. Kaalyavana vadha
18. Mucukunda stuti
19. Syamanta harana
20. Naradar krishna darsana
21. Vipra putra anayana
22. Damodara upakhyana
23. Daivakir putra anayana
24. Veda stuti
25. Krishna lilamala
26. Srikrishnar vaikuntha prayana
27. Bhagavatar tatparya
28. Uresa varnana
