= Hiranaam =

Hiranaam is a form of Sattriya music related to the Vaishnava religious scriptures. The singers, the Gayans accompany themselves with cymbals played by the Bayans. The singing mainly involves chanting the names of Krishna, in a call and response style.

== See also ==
- Music of Assam
