= Sankardev =

Indian polymath (1449–1568)

- The Jagat Guru
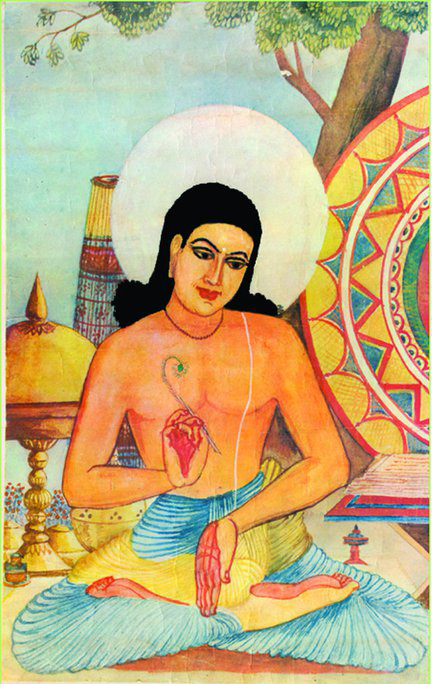
- Imaginary portrait of Srimanta Sankardev by Bishnu Prasad Rabha

Personal life
- Born: 1449 Bordowa, old name is Alipukhuri, Tembuani Nagaon district, Assam, India)
- Died: 1568 (aged 118–119) Bheladonga (Today Cooch Behar, West Bengal, India)
- Parents: Kusumbar Siromani Bhuyan (father); Satyasandhya (mother)
- Honors: Venerated as Mahapurusha

Religious life
- Religion: Hinduism
- Founder of: Ekasarana Dharma
- Philosophy: Ekasarana

Religious career
- Successor: Madhavdev

Quotation

Do, therefore, regard all and everything as though they were God Himself!? Seek not to know the caste of a Brahmana nor of a Chandala.

Srimanta Sankardev (/ˈsrɪˌmæntəˈsænkərˌdeɪv/, Assamese pronunciation: [sɹimɔntɔ xɔŋkɔɹdeβ]; 1449–1568) was a 15th–16th century Assamese polymath; a saint-scholar, poet, playwright, dancer, actor, musician, artist social-religious reformer and a figure of importance in the cultural and religious history of the Bhakti movement in Assam. He is credited with building on past cultural relics and devising new forms of music (Borgeet), theatrical performance (Ankia Naat, Bhaona), dance (Sattriya), literary language (Brajavali). Besides, he has left a literary oeuvre of trans-created scriptures (Bhagavat of Sankardev), poetry and theological works written in Sanskrit, Assamese and Brajavali. The Bhagavatic religious movement he started, Ekasarana Dharma and also called Neo-Vaishnavite movement, influenced two medieval kingdoms – Koch and the Ahom kingdom – and the assembly of devotees he initiated evolved over time into monastic centers called Sattras, which continue to be important socio-religious institutions in Assam and to a lesser extent in North Bengal.

His literary and artistic contributions are living traditions in Assam today. The religion he preached is practised by a large population, and Sattras (monasteries) that he and his followers established continue to flourish and sustain his legacy.

== Biography ==
After the death of Sankardev, Madhavdev incorporated narrations of his life in prayer services, a practice that his apostles followed, and in due course of time, a large body of biographical literature arose. These are generally classed in two groups: early (those by Daityari Thakur, Bhusan Dwija, Ramananda Dwija and Vaikuntha Dwija) and late (Guruvarnana by Aniruddha Das, the more than one anonymous Katha-guru-carits, Bardowa-carit, Sankardev caritra from Barpeta, the Saru-svarga-khanda and Bar-svarga-khanda by Sarvabhauma). The authorship of the biography credited to Ramcaran Thakur, Daityari Thakur's father, is doubted, and it is generally dated to the 17th century and classed with the late biographies.

In general, all biographies consider Sankardev as an incarnation of Vishnu, including that by Daityari Thakur, the earliest. The late biographies differ from the early group on the count that they ascribe supernatural feats to Sankardev, and describe miraculous events; and there is a tendency to read some events of the Bhagavata into his life. The biographies are full of contradictions; even though the earlier ones are considered more accurate, not all that they claim is true. Daityari Thakur's biography, the earliest one, claims Sankardev met with Chaitanya, which is now not accepted to be true.

=== Early life: Bordowa ===
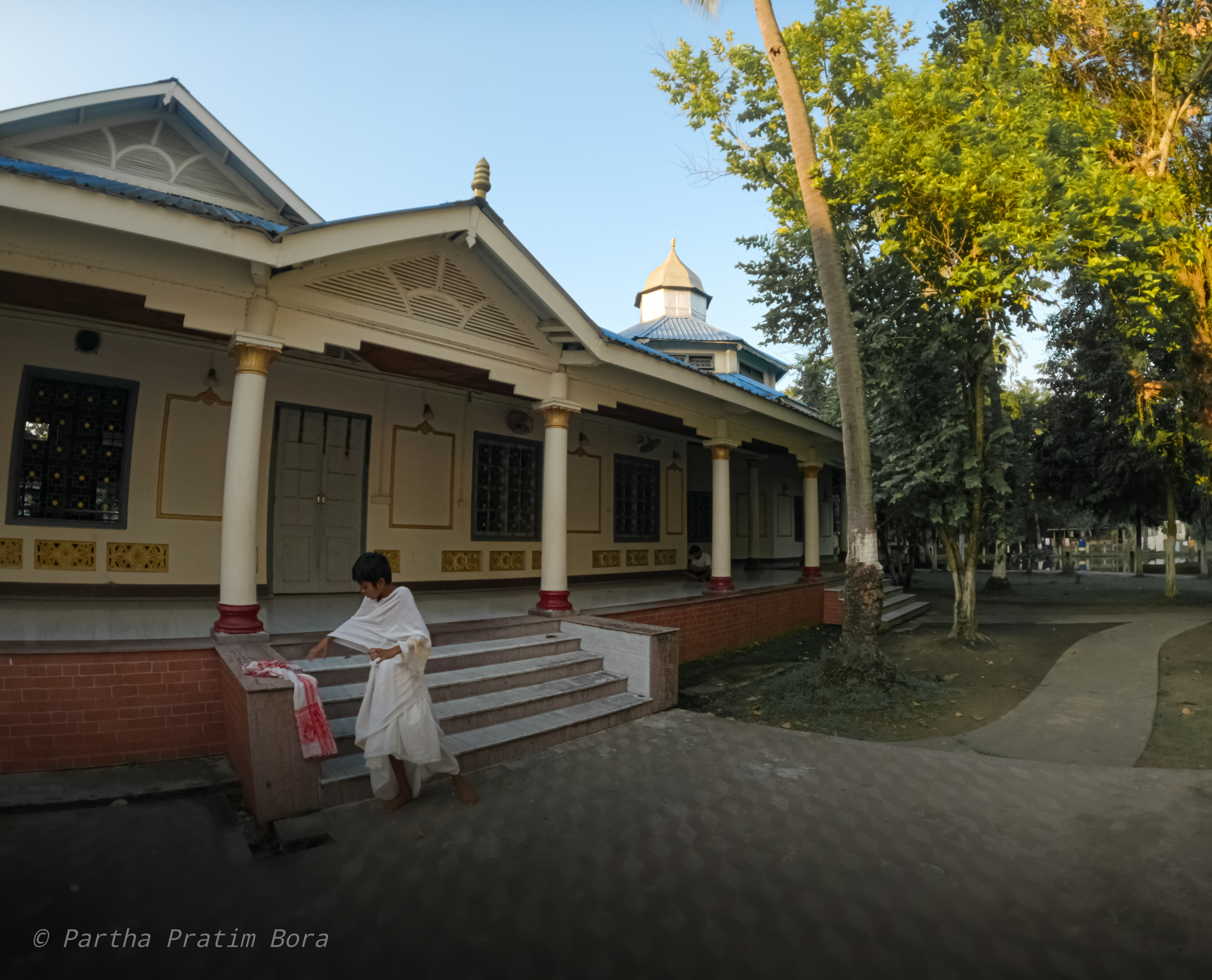
Kirtan Ghar in the birthplace of Simanta Sankardev.

Sankardev's Family Tree

Chandivara	Sandhya
Rajadhara	Devahuti
Khersuti	Suryavara	Jayanta	Halayudha	Madhava
Satyasandha	Kusumvara	Anudhriti	Satananda
Suryavati	Sankardev	Kalindi	Haladhara	Ramaraya
Hari	Manu	Ramananda	Kamalocana	Haricarana	Kamalapriya	Chilarai
Purushottam	Chaturbhuj

Sankardev, then named Sankaravara, was born into the Shiromani (chief) Baro-Bhuyans family at Bordowa (Alipukhuri, Tembuani) in present-day Nagaon district in c1449. Though some authors have expressed doubt that Sankardev could have lived that long, considering that he was of good health, 1449 is generally accepted. The Baro-Bhuyans were independent landlords in Assam, and Sankardev belonged to the sudra kayastha family . His family members, including parents Kusumvar Bhuyan and Satyasandhya Devi, were Saktas. Sankardev lost his father to smallpox when he was about 7 years old, and his mother died either soon after his birth, or soon after his father's death; and he was raised by his grandmother Khersuti.

He began attending Mahendra Kandali's tol or chatrasaal (school) at the age of 12 and soon wrote his first verses karatala-kamala. The complete poem was written before he was taught the vowels, except, of course, the first one, and is often cited as an example of the early flowering of his poetic genius. He stayed at the tol during his teens, and studied grammar and Indian scriptures. He practised yoga (which he gave up later) and was physically very able, and according to legend, he could swim across the Brahmaputra while it was in spate. It is generally believed that he wrote his first work, Harishchandra upakhyan, while at the tol. Mahendra Kandali changed his name to 'Sankardev' while he was at school.

==== Bhuyan shiromaniship ====
Sankardev soon mastered the major scriptures and thereafter left the tol in his late teens (c1465) to attend to his responsibilities as the Shiromani Bhuyan. He came to be known as the Dekagiri among his subjects and admirers. As Alipukhuri had become crowded, he moved his household from Alipukhuri to Bordowa. He married his first wife, Suryava, ti when he was of his early age20s and a daughter, Manu, was born in about three years, but his wife died about nine months later.

==== First pilgrimage ====
It is possible that the death of his wife increased his already existing spiritual inclination, and he left for a twelve-year-long pilgrimage, sometime after his daughter was married to Hari, a Bhuyan scion. He handed over the maintenance of his household to his son-in-law Hari; the Bhuyan Shiromaniship to his grand uncles Jayanta and Madhav; and began his journey in 1481. He was accompanied by seventeen others, including his friend and associate Ramaram and his teacher Mahendra Kandali. At this point of time, he was 32. The pilgrimage took him to Puri, Mathura, Dwaraka, Vrindavan, Gaya, Rameswaram, Ayodhya, Sitakunda and almost all the other major seats of the Vaishnavite religion in Indiaseemse seem to have spent many years at Jagannath-kshetra at Puri, where he read and explained the Brahma Purana to the priests and lay people. At Badrikashram in 1488, he composed his first borgeet—mana meri ram charanahi lagu—in Brajavali. According to Katha Gurucharit, the first Borgeet was "Rama meri hridaya pankaje baise" and he composed it in 1481 at the very outset of the pilgrimage at a place called Rowmari. He returned home to Alipukhuri after 12 years (his family had moved back from Bordowa in his absence). During his pilgrimage, he became a part of a pan-Indian Bhakti movement and helped it blossom.

==== Shiromaniship refusal ====
On his return from his pilgrimage (c1493), Sankardev refused to take back the Shiromaniship, though on the insistence of his elders, he took responsibility of a hundred families (gomastha), but he soon handed over the responsibility to his son-in-law Hari. On his grandmother's insistence, he married Kalindi at the age of 54. Finally, he moved back to Bordowa and constructed a temple (devagriha) in c1498, possibly a thatched house, built on the original site of his father's house where he could meet with people, discuss religious matters and hold prayers, and preach. He wrote Bhakti pradipa and Rukmini harana. Soon after, he received a copy of the Bhagavata Purana from Jagadisa Mishra of Mithila, with Sridhara Swami's monistic commentary "Bhavartha-dipika". Mishra recited and explained the entire Bhagavata in the presence of Sankarde, and this event is considered critical in the development of Ekasarana. Datyari, an early biographer of Sankardev, writes: Sankardev listened with rapt attention to the exposition by Jagadish Mishra and realised that the Bhagavata was a scripture without parallel, a scripture that determined Krishna as the only God, naam as the real dharma, and aikantika-sarana and sat-sanga as the indispensable elements of the faith." He also began composing the Kirtana ghosha.

==== Cihna-yatra ====
After his exposure to the detailed Bhagavata Purana and Sridhara Swami's commentary Bhavartha-dipika, Sankardev produced a dance-drama called Cihna yatra, for which he painted the Sapta vaikuntha (seven heavens), guided the making of musical instruments and played the instruments himself. According to other biographers, Sankardev produced Maha-nata in the presence of Jagdish Mishra in the temple he had constructed at Alipukhuri.

According to Neog, this was the point when Sankardev decided to preach a new religion. Some of the first to be initiated into this religion were the wife of Jayanta-dalai, a leper named Hariram (later Tulasiram), Ramaram, his associate and Mahendra Kandali, his tol teacher. The 13 years at Alipukhuri were the period during which he reflected on Vaishnavism and on the form that would suit the spiritual and ethical needs of the people. Ananta Kandali, a profound scholar of Sanskrit, became his disciple during this time; he translated the latter part of Canto X of the Bhagavata Purana after consulting Sankardev.

From Alipukhu, Ri Sankardev moved back to Bordowa in 1509 and built a thaan. Some authors claim that this than had all the major features of a sattra (central kirtanghar, cari-hat, i etc.), whereas many others assert that these features did not exist during Sankardev's time. This than was abandoned and more than a hundred years later in the middle of the 17th-century, Sankardev's granddaughter-in-law, Kanaklata, established it again.

==== Literary works in the Baro-Bhuyan territories ====
1. Non-Bhagavata group
  - Harishcandra-Upakhyana
  - Bhakti-pradip
  - Kirtan-ghosa (Uresa-varnana)
2. Non-Bhagavata mixed with Bhagavata elements, not influenced by Sridhara Swami
  - Rukmini-harana-kavya
3. Lyrics
  - Borgeet
4. Bhagavata tales, not from Book X
  - Ajamilopakhyan (Book VI)
  - Amrta-manthan (Book VIII)
  - Kirtan-ghosa (Ajamilopakhyan, Prahlada-caritra, Harmohana,
  - Sections ii–vi

=== Ahom kingdom ===
==== Gangmau ====
Biswa Singha began his activities to remove the Bhuyans from power in the western part of the Brahmaputra valley in 1509. Furthermore, the Bhuyans in the Bordowa area picked up a quarrel with their Kachari neighbours, and when attacked, Sankardev advised the Bhuyans to move, which brought to an end the independence of this group of Bhuyans. Sankardev and his associates first crossed the Brahmaputra river in 1516–17 and settled first at Singari and finally at Routa; and when Viswa Singha advanced towards Routa, Sankardev moved to Gangmau in the Ahom kingdom in 1527. At Gangmau, they stayed for five years, where Sankardev's eldest son Ramananda was born. At Gangmau, he wrote the drama Patniprasad. He lived alone at a place named Gajalasuti out of dissatisfaction with some relative. He penned the play there.

==== Dhuwahat ====
While at Gangmau, the Koch king Biswa Singha attacked the Ahoms. The Bhuyans fought for the Ahoms, and the Koch king was defeated. Due to the unsettled situation at Gangmau S the anka, the rdev next moved to Dhuwahat, near Ahatguri in present-day Majuli, washed away by the Brahmaputra in 1913. The Bhuyans were settled here by the Ahoms with land and estate, Hari, Sankardev's son-in-law, became a Saikia, and his cousin Jagatananda, grandson of J, received a title 'Ramarai'. At Dhuwahat, he met his spiritual successor Madhavdev. Madhavdev, a sakta, got into a religious altercation with his brother-in-law, R amadas, who had recently converted to Vaishnavism. Ramadas took him to Sankardev, who, after a long debate, convinced him of the power and the efficacy of Ekasarana. The acquisition of Madhavdev, with his talent in poetry, singing and dedicationnewfoundew-found religion and guru, was a significant event in the Ekasarana history. At Dhowbei, he managed to attract wider attention and popularity, and he initiated many others into his religion.

The popularity of Ekasarana and the conversion of people alarmed the priestly Brahmins, who reacted with anger and hostility. Sankardev tried to diffuse their hostility—by meeting with them at the house of his relative Budha-Khan and asking his Brahmin antagonists to install a wooden idol of Jagannath, called Madan-Mohan, at his religious seat. (Sankardev left this idol hanging on a tree when he took flight from Dhuwahat, and it was rescued years later by Vamshigopaldev and installed at Deberapar-sattr.). The Brahmins finally complained to the Ahom king, Suhungmung (1497–1539), who summoned Sankardev to his court for a debate with them. Sankardev was able to convince the king that he was not a religious rebel and a threat to the social order, and the charges against him were dropped. The hostility, nevertheless, continued.

===== Flight from Dhuwahat =====
Though the positions of the Bhuyans in the Ahom kingdom began comfortably—with Sankardev's son-in-law, Hari, becoming a Paik officer and Ramrai, his cousin, becoming a royal official—the relationship gradually deteriorated. After the death of Viswasingha, who was inimical to the Bhuyans, and the rise of Naranarayan (1540), the Koch-Bhuyan relationship improved somewhat. Sometime in the 1540s during the reign of Suklenmung (1539–1552, a royal officer visited the region for an elephant capturing expedition. Hari did not make himself available, and an elephant escaped through a barrier managed by the Bhuyans. The officer took grave offence at this dereliction of duty and arrested Hari as well as Madhavdev. At Garhgaon, Hari was executed and Madhavdev interned for about a year. According to Daityari, taking advantage of the Koch advance against the Ahoms (1546–1547), Sankardev and his followers escaped from the Ahom kingdom as they fell behind the vanguard of the Koch army setting up their garrison in Narayanpur further to the east.

==== Literary works in the Ahom kingdom ====
1. Arguments against those antagonistic to bhakti
  - Kirtan-ghosa (Pasanda-mardana, Namaparadha)
  - (Vipra)-patni-prasad (Ankia Naat)
2. Tales from Krishna's early life
  - Kirtan-ghosa (sisu-lila, rasa-krida, kamsavadha, gopi-uddhava-samvada, kujir vancha-purana, akrurar vancha-purana)
3. Borgeets

=== Koch kingdom ===
==== Sunpora ====
Sankardev and his followers reached Kapalabari in the Koch kingdom in the later part of 1540 and put up there. But the water was very alkaline there. Several members, including Madhavdev's mother, Manoram, died there. So after staying for some time at Kapalabari, Sankardev and his group moved to Sunpora in 1541. At Sunpo, Ra Sankardev initiated Bhavananda, a rich trader who had extensive business interests in the Garo Hills and Bhutan Hills besides Kamarupa. The trader, Narayana Das, settled at Janiya near Barpeta and took to agriculture. A man of the world otherwise, he soon flourished and became a provider to Sankardev and his devotees. He came to be known popularly as Thakur Ata.

==== Patbausi ====
After moving around, Sankardev settled at Patbausi near Barpeta in the Koch Kingdom and constructed a Kirtanghar (house of prayer). Some of the people he initiated here are Chakrapani Dwija and Sarvabhaum Bhattacharya, Brahmins; Govinda, a Garo; Jayaram, a Bhutia; Madhai, a Jaintia; Jatiram, an ascetic; and Murari, a Koch. Damodardev, a Brahmin, was initiated by Sankardev. Damodardev was entrusted by Sankardev to initiate Brahmin disciples. A Sattra was also constructed for him at Patbausi itself. Later, R. Damodardev became the founder of the Brahma Sanghati sect of Sankardev's religion.

Among Sankardev's literary works, he completed his rendering of the Bhagavata Purana and wrote other independent works. He continued composing the Kirtan Ghosha, further translated the first canto of the Ramayana (Adi Kanda) and instructed Madhavdev to translate the last canto (Uttara Kanda), portions that were left undone by the 14th-century poet Madhav Kandali. He wrote four plays: Rukmini harana, Parijata harana, Keligopala and Kalidamana. Another play written at Patbausi, Kansa Vadha, is lost. At Patbausi, he had lent his barges, numbering around 240, to Kamala Gayan. But unfortunately, Gayan's house was gutted and most of the borgeets were lost. Since that incident, Sankardev stopped composing Bargeet. Of the 240, 34 remain today.

==== Second Pilgrimage ====
Sankardev once again left for a pilgrimage in 1550 with a large party of 117 disciples that included Madhavdev, Ramrai, Ramaram, Thakur Ata and others. Thakur Ata had to return after just one day's journey. Madhavdev had to take the entire responsibility of logistics. He, on the request of Sankardev's wife Kalind, urged him to return from Puri and not proceed to Vrindavana. Sankardev and the group returned to Patbausi within six months in 1551.

==== Koch capital and Bheladanga ====
On receiving repeated complaints that Sankardev was corrupting the minds of the people by spreading a new religion, Nara Narayan, the Koch king ordered Sankardev's arrest, and Sankardev went into hiding. Chilarai— the general of the Koch army, half-brother of the king and married to Kamalapriya, the daughter of Sankardev's cousin Ramarai— then convinced the king to give Sankardev a hearing instead.

For the audience with Nara Narayan, as he moved up the steps to the court, Sankardev sang his Sanskrit totaka hymn, composed extempore, to Lord Krishna madhu daanava daarana deva varam and as he sat down, he sang a borgeet, narayana kahe bhakati karu tera, playing on the name of the king. At the debate with the court pundits that followed, Sankardev was able to refute all allegations against him. The king declared him free are honoured him with a seat close to the throne. Sankardev began to attend Naranarayana's court regularly and received the freedom to propagate his teachings.

Chilarai was instrumental in keeping Sankardev safe and supporting his work. Many of Sankardev's literary and dramatic works were completed in his domain with his patronage and protection. Sankardev acknowledged his appreciation in his play 'Ram Vijaya'.

Sankardev shuttled between Koch Behar, the capital, and Patbau, his seat. He was often hosted by Chilarai, and on his request, agreed to have the images of the childhood days of Krishna at Vrindavan woven on cloth. He engaged the weavers of Tantikuchi, near Barpeta, to weave a forty-yard-long tapestry panel. Sankaradeva provided the designs to be woven, chose the various colours of thread to be used, and supervised the weaving. It took about a year to complete and, deriving its name from its theme, came to be known as the Vrindavani vastra. It was presented to Chilarai and Naranarayan. A section of this cloth is preserved now in the Victoria and Albert Museum in London.

Chandsai, a Muslim tailor serving the Koch king, became a disciple of Sankardev at Kochbehar. When Sankardev returned to Patbausi some time later, Chandsai too came with the saint. Sankardev frequented the capital for more than 20 years and enjoyed unstinted royal patronage for the first time.

==== End ====
He made arrangements with Madhavdev and Thakur Ata and gave them various instructions at Patbausi and left the place for the last time. He set up his home at Bheladonga in Kochbehar. During his stay at Kochbehar, Maharaja Naranarayana expressed his wish to be initiated. Sankardev was reluctant to convert a king and declined to do so. (According to one of the biographers, Ramcharan Thakur) A painful boil; a visha phohara – had appeared in some part of his body, and this led to the death of the Saint. Thus, in 1568, after leading a most eventful life dedicated to enlightening humans, ty the Mahapurusha died, after four months of his last stay at Bheladonga–, aged 120.

==== Literary works in the Koch kingdom ====
1. Bhagavata tales, not from Book X
  - Bali-chalana (Book VIII)
  - Anadi-patana (Book III, Vamana-purana)
2. Bhagavata tales from Books X, XI, XIII
  - Kirtan-ghosa (Jarasandha yudha, Kalayavana badha, Mucukunda-stuti, Syamanta-haran, Naradar-krishna-darsan, Vipra-putra-anayana, Daivakir-putra-anayana, Veda-stuti, Lilamala, Rukminir-prem-kalah, Bhrigu-pariksha, srikrishnar-vaikuntha-prayana, Chaturvimsati-avatar-varnana, Tatparya)
3. Gunamala
  - Section i
4. Renderings of Bhagavata Purana
  - Bhagavata X (Adi)
  - Bhagavata XI (with material from Books I and III)
  - Bhagavata XII
  - Bhagavata I
  - Bhagavata II
  - Bhagavata IX (lost)
  - Kurukshetra (Book X, Uttarardha)
  - Nimi-nava-siddha-samvada
5. From Ramayana
  - Ramayana, Uttara-kanda
6. Lyrics
  - Borgeets
  - Totaya
  - Bhatima
7. Doctrinal treatise
  - Bhakti-ratnakar
8. Drama (Ankia Naat)
  - Kali-daman
  - Keli-gopal
  - Rukmini-haran
  - Parijat-haran
  - Ram-vijay
9. Visual Art
  - Vrindavani vastra – parts of this work are preserved in London.
Timeline
Bordowa
Pilgrimage 1
Bordowa
Gangmau
Dhuwahat
Patbausi
Susenphaa
Suhenphaa
Supimphaa
Suhungmung
Suklenmung
Sukhaamphaa
Chakradhwaj
Nilambar
Viswa Singha
Naranarayan
│
1460
│
1470
│
1480
│
1490
│
1500
│
1510
│
1520
│
1530
│
1540
│
1550
│
1560
│
1570

== Ekasarana ==
Sankardev preached devotion (bhakti) to Krishna consisting primarily in the singing (kirtan) and listening to (sravan) of his deeds and activities. Ekasarana follows the dasya attitude (bhava) of worship in which the devotee considers himself to be a servant of God. In contrast to other Vaishnava schools, Radha is not worshiped along with Krishna.

The people who practice his religion are referred to variously as Mahapurushia, Sarania and Sankari.

Srimanta Sankardev started a system of initiation (Sarana) into his religion. He caused a social revolution by fighting against the caste discrimination prevailing at that time. He initiated people of all castes and religions, including Muslims. After initiation, the devotee is expected to adhere to the religious tenets of Ekasarana consisting in worship to one God, Krishna, and offering devotion to him, forsaking all forms of Vedic rites.

Though he himself married twice, had children and led the life of a householder, his disciple Madhavdev did not. Some of his followers today follow celibate life (kevaliya bhakat) in the Vaishnavite monasteries – the sattras.

Sankardev's famous debate with Madhavdev, who was a staunch sakta (devotee of Shakti) earlier, and Madhavdev's subsequent induction into Ekasarana, is often cited as the single most epoch-making event in the history of the neo-Vaishnavite movement in Assam. Madhavdev, an equally multi-talented person, became his celebrated disciple.

== Literary works ==
Sankardev produced a large body of work. Though there were others before him who wrote in the language of the common man – Madhav Kandali who translated the Ramayana into Assamese in the 14th century – This was the first ramayana to be written in a modern Indian language – Harihara Vipra and Hema Saraswati, it was Sankardev who opened the floodgates and inspired others like Madhavdev to carry on where he left off. His magnum opus is his Kirtana-ghosha, a work so popular that even today it is found in many household in Assam. It contains narrative verses glorifying Krishna meant for community singing. It is a bhakti kayva par excellence, written in a lively and simple language, it has "stories and songs for amusement [for children], it delights the young with true poetic beauty and elderly people find here religious instruction and wisdom".

For most of his works, he used the Assamese language of the period so the lay person could read and understand them. But for dramatic effect in his songs and dramas he used Brajavali.

Other literary works include the rendering of eight books of the Bhagavata Purana including the Adi Dasama (Book X), Harishchandra-upakhyana (his first work), Bhakti-pradip, the Nimi-navasiddha-samvada (conversation between King Nimi and the nine Siddhas), Bhakti-ratnakara (Sanskrit verses, mostly from the Bhagavata, compiled into a book), Anadi-patana (having as its theme the creation of the universe and allied cosmological matters), Gunamala and many plays like Rukmini haran, Patni prasad, Keli gopal, Kurukshetra yatra and Srirama vijaya. There was thus a flowering of Bhakti literature during his long life of 120 years.

=== Poetic works (kavya) ===
- Kirtana-ghosha
- Harischandra-upakhyana
- Rukmini-harana
- Parijat-haran
- Kaliya-daman
- Ram-vijay
- Ajamilopakhyana
- Bali-chalana
- Kurukshetra-yatra
- Gopi-uddhava-samvada
- Amrita-manthana
- Krishna-prayana-pandava-niryana
- Kamajaya

=== Bhakti Theory ===
- Bhakati-pradipa
- Anadi-patana
- Nimi-navasiddha-samvada
- Bhakti Ratnakara (in Sanskrit)
- Gunamala

=== Transliteration ===
- Bhagavata (Book VI, VIII, I, II, VII, X, XI, XII, IX, X(partial, XI(partial) & XII)
- Ramayana (Uttarakanda, supplemental to Madhav Kandali's Saptakanda Ramayana)

His translation of the Bhagavata is a transcreation, because he translates not just the words but the idiom and the physiognomy too. He has adapted the original text to the local land and people and importantly for the purpose of bhakti. Portions of the original were left out or elaborated where appropriate. For example, he suppressed the portions that revile the lowers caste of sudra and kaivartas, and extols them elsewhere.

=== Drama (Ankia Nat) ===
- Cihna Yatra (lost)
- Patni-prasada
- Janma-jatra (lost)
- Kangsa-badha (lost)
- Parijata-harana
- Kali-damana
- Rukmini-harana
- Keli-gopala
- Srirama-vijaya

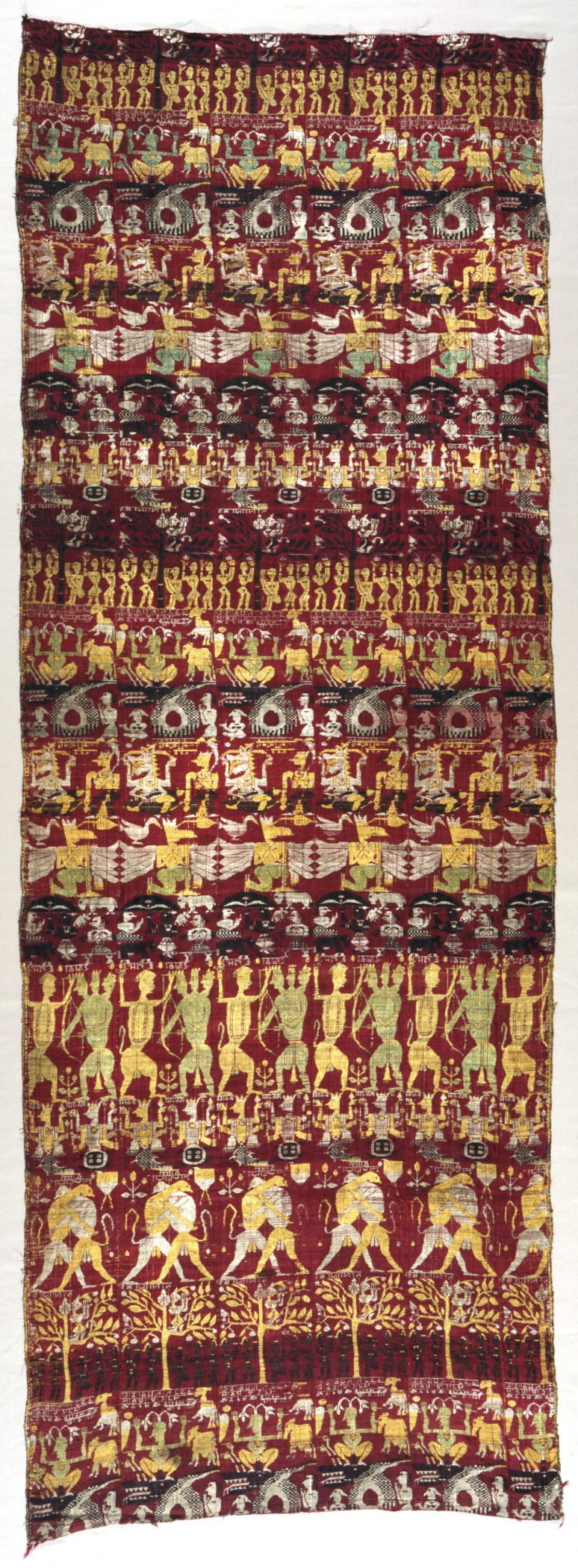
Vrindavani vastra (fragment), circa 1570, at LACMA

Sankardev was the fountainhead of the Ankiya naat, a form of one-act play. His Cihna Yatra is regarded as one of the first open-air theatrical performances in the world. Cihna yatra was probably a dance drama and no text of that show is available today. Innovations like the presence of a Sutradhara (narrator) on the stage, use of masks etc., were used later in the plays of Bertolt Brecht and other eminent playwrights.

These cultural traditions still form an integral part of the heritage of the Assamese people.

=== Songs ===
- Borgeet (composed 240, but only 34 exist now)
- Bhatima
  - Deva bhatima – panegyrics to God
  - Naat bhatima – for use in dramas
  - Raja bhatima – panegyrics to king Nara Narayan

He is a musician; All his creations were orienting to the Vishanav religion and one set of them is called 'Holy Songs', which are known as 'Borgeet(Bargit or Bargeet)' till today in Assam.

The Borgeets (literally: great songs) are devotional songs, set to music and sung in various raga styles. These styles are slightly different from either the Hindustani or the Carnatic styles. The songs themselves are written in the 'Brajavali' language.

=== Dance ===
Sattriya dance, that Sankardev first conceived and developed and which was later preserved for centuries by the sattras, is now among the classical dance forms of India. Although certain devout Sankarite calls this form as Sankari dance

=== Visual Art ===
- Sapta vaikuntha – part of the Cihna yatra production, does not exist today.
- Vrindavani vastra – parts of this work are preserved in London.

The famous Vrindavani Vastra—the cloth of Vrindavan—a 120 x 60 cubits tapestry depicted the lilas of Lord Krishna at Vrindavan through richly woven and embroidered designs on silk. A specimen, believed to be a part of this work, is at the Association pour l'Etude et la Documentation des Textiles d'Asie collection at Paris (inv. no. 3222). The vastra, commissioned by Koch king Naranarayana, was woven by 12 master weavers in Barpeta under the supervision of Sankardev over a period of six-month and completed towards the end of 1554. This textile art depicted the life and deeds of lord Krishna, who is worshipped in Eka Sarana Nama Dharma. The cloth was housed in the royal court of Kochbehar after the saint presented it to the king; but it disappeared at some point. It is believed that parts of this cloth made its way to Tibet and from there to its present place.

== See also ==
- Sattra
- Borgeet
- Madhavdev
- Dihanaam
- Ankia Naat
- Vrindavani vastra
