= Bhagavat of Sankardev =

Assamese adaption of Bhagavata Purana

The Bhagavat of Sankardev is the Assamese adaptation of the Bhagavata Purana made by Srimanta Sankardev in 15th-16th century in the regions that form present-day Assam and Cooch Behar. Though the major portions of the work was transcreated by Sankardev, a few other writers from that period contributed to the remaining sections.

This book is revered and forms the central religious text for the followers of Sankardev (Ekasarana Dharma). The text is not a literal translation from the original Sanskrit into the vernacular but it is an adaptation to the local milieu in language and content.

== Sankardev's transcreation ==
Srimanta Sankardev transcreated the different sections of the original Bhagavata Purana at different times of his life. They are:

=== In the Bara Bhuyan territory ===
1. Book VI (Ajamilopakhayana part)
2. Book VIII (Amrta-manthana part): Sankardev omits the first and the last chapters of the original twenty-four chapters, and narrates four stories from the rest (Gajendropakhyana, Amrta-manthana, Hara-mohana and Bali-chalana). Of these stories the first and third belong to Kirtana-ghoxa, and the fourth is an independent work. Nevertheless, they are all presented together to form a part of the composite. Sankardev develops Amrta-manthana freely and embellishes it with poetic sentiments and episodes.

=== In the Koch kingdom ===
1. Book I
2. Book II
3. Book VII (Bali chalana part):
4. Book IX (lost):
5. Book X: The first part of this book, Adi-daxama, was rendered by Sankardev between 1551 and 1558; and he intended it to be the chief authoritative literature of his religious order (Ekasarana dharma) since he inserted a large number of original passages known as upedesas (admonitions) in it. Compared to the Kirtana-ghoxa, the language here is sober and mature. Though the rendering is largely faithful to the original, it follows the interpretations of Sridhara Swami's Bhawartha-dipika. Krishna's sportiveness is increased and philosophical portions are omitted.
6. Book XI
7. Book XII

From among these sections, Book X, locally called the daxama, is particularly popular among the Mahapuruxiya dharma works, next only to kirtan ghoxa. Sankardev's translations of Book IX are believed to be lost.

The other transcreators are:

- Book IV Ananta Kandali, Aniruddha Kavi, Gopal Charan Dvija
- Book V Aniruddha Kavi
- Book VII Kesava Das
- Book IX Kesava Das
- Book X Ananta Kandali (Seh part)

== Differences from the original ==
The original, which was written in Sanskrit was rendered into Assamese words and idioms of the time by Sankardev, but it was not a verbatim translation. He intentionally left out some sections and summarized or elaborated others, to fit the situation in Assam. He replaced the name of the tribes and flowers by those found in Assam, for instance, thus specifically targeting the local populace. More significantly, whereas the original texts mention varnashrama but he mentions new social order. Some of the more abstruse philosophical parts were summarized and rendered so that the common people in Assam could understand them.
