= Ankia Naat =

Assamese plays

Ankia Naats (Assamese: অংকীয়া নাট) are a class of one act plays performed in Assam, India. The invention of the Ankia Naat is usually attributed to the medieval saint and social reformer Srimanta Sankardeva. These plays were written in an artificial old medieval period poetic Assamese mixed language called Brajavali and are primarily centered on Krishna. A particular presentation of an Ankia Naat is called a Bhaona. The plays usually combine live instruments and singers, dance and elaborate costumes in production.

The performance of an Ankia Naat starts with benediction in Sanskrit followed by eulogy to God in Brajavali. The play usually starts with the prelude, or Purvaranga. Playing of the traditional percussion instruments accompanied by the big cymbal by the singer and musician duo (Gayan, Bayan) in a group. The instruments are played with exaggerated hand movements and in two paces called Saru-Dhemali and Bor-Dhemali. After the prelude, the narrator, or Sutradhar, enters the stage and begins the actual performance.

Ankia Naat were intended to be viewed by common folk in medieval Assam, majority of whom were expected to be illiterate. Thus, an explanation was included at every succeeding stage of the drama. The Sutradhar had to attend to various tasks viz. production, direction and delivered commentary of the entire drama.

Ankia Naat main subject is to worship Lord Krishna. The songs in Ankia Naat are also descriptive.
