= Ekasarana Dharma =

Vaishnava Hindu sect

Ekasarana Dharma (lit. 'Shelter-in-One dharma') is a Vaishnavite sect propagated by Srimanta Sankardeva in the 15th–16th century in the Indian state of Assam. It reduced focus on Vedic ritualism and focuses on devotion (bhakti) to Krishna in the form of congregational listening (shravan) and singing his name and deeds (kirtan).

The simple and accessible sect attracted both Hindu and non-Hindu populations into its egalitarian fold. The neophytes continue to be inducted into the faith via an initiation ceremony called xoron-lowa (literally: take-shelter), usually conducted by Sattradhikars, heads of monastic institutions called Sattras, who generally draw apostolic lineage from Sankardev. Some Sattradhikars, especially those from the Brahma-sanghati, reject apostolic lineage from Sankardev due to an early schism with the order. Some modern reformation institutions conduct xoron-lowa outside the sattra institution. Institutions propagating Eka Sarana like sattra (monasteries) and village Namghar (prayer houses), had profound influence in the evolution of the social makeup of Assam. The artistic creations emanating from this movement led to engendering of new forms of literature, music (Borgeets or songs celestial), theatre (Ankia Naat) and dance (Sattriya dance).

The central religious text of this sect is Bhagavat of Sankardeva, which was rendered from the Sanskrit Bhagavata Purana by Srimanta Sankardeva and other early members of the Eka Sarana school. This book is supplemented by the two books of songs for congregational singing: Kirtan Ghoxa by Sankardeva and Naam Ghoxa by Madhabdev. These books are written in the Assamese language.

The sect is also called Mahapuruxiya because it is based on the worship of the Mahapurux or Mahapurush (Sanskrit: Maha: great and purusha: being), an epithet of the supreme spiritual personality in the Bhagavata and its adherents are often called Mahapuruxia, Sankari etc. In course of time, the epithet 'Mahapurux' came also to be secondarily applied to Sankardeva and Madhabdev, the principal preceptors. Non-adherence to the Hindu varna system and rejection of Vedic karma marked its character. Though often seen as a part of the wider, pan-Indian Bhakti movement, it does not worship Radha with Krishna, which is common in many other Vaishnava schools. It is characterised by the dasya form of worship. Historically, it has been against caste system, and especially against animal sacrifices common in other sects of Hinduism, especially Shaktism. Noted for its egalitarianism, it posed a serious challenge to Brahminical Hinduism, and converted into its fold people of all castes, ethnicities, and religions (including Islam).

== Worshipful God and salvation ==
The preceptors as well as later leaders of the Ekasarana religion focused mainly on the religious practice of bhakti and kept away from systematically expounding philosophical positions. Nevertheless, references found scattered in the voluminous works of Sankardeva and Madhavdeva indicate that their theosophical positions are rooted in the Bhagavata Purana with a strong Advaita influence via its commentary Bhavartha-dipika by Sridhar Swami. Nevertheless, Sankardeva's interpretation of these texts were seen at once to be "original and new". Scholars hold that these texts are not followed in-toto and deviations are often seen in the writings especially when the original philosophical contents came into conflict with the primary focus of bhakti as enunciated in the Ekasarana-dharma.

=== Nature of God ===
Though Ekasarana acknowledges the impersonal (nirguna) god, it identifies the personal (saguna) one as worshipful which it identifies in the Bhagavad-Puranic Narayana. The sole aspect that distinguishes the personal from the impersonal one is the act of creation, by which Narayana created everything. Unlike in Gaudiya Vaishnavism it claims no distinction between Brahman, Paramatman and Bhagavat, which are considered in Ekasarana as just different appellations applied to the same supreme reality.

Even though Narayana is sometimes used synonymously with Vishnu, the gods Vishnu, Brahma and Shiva are considered of lower divinity.

Narayana as the personal and worshipful god is considered to be a loving and lovable god, who possesses auspicious attributes that attract devotees. He is non-dual, omnipotent and omniscient; creator, sustainer, and destroyer of all. He also possesses moral qualities like karunamaya (compassionate), dinabandhu (friend of the lowly), bhakta-vatsala (beloved of devotees) and patit-pavana (redeemer of sinners) that make him attractive to devotees. Though it does not deny the existence of other gods, it asserts that Narayana alone is worshipful and the others are strictly excluded.

==== Krishna ====
Following the Bhagavata Purana, the object of devotion in Ekasarana is Krishna, who is the supreme entity himself. All other deities are subservient to Him. Brahman, Vishnu and Krishna are fundamentally one. Krishna is alone the supreme worshipful in the system. Sankaradeva's Krishna is Nārāyana, the Supreme Reality or Parama Brahma and not merely an avatara of Visnu. Krishna is God Himself. It considers Narayana (Krishna) as both the cause as well as the effect of this creation, and asserts Narayana alone is the sole reality. From the philosophical angle, He is the Supreme Spirit (Param-Brahma). As the controller of the senses, the Yogis call him Paramatma. When connected with this world, He assumes the name of Bhagavanta. Moreover, some of the characteristics usually reserved for the impersonal God in other philosophies are attributed to Narayana with reinterpretations.

=== Jiva and salvation ===
The embodied self, called jiva or jivatma is identical to Narayana. It is shrouded by maya and thus suffers from misery, When the ego (ahamkara) is destroyed, the jiva can perceive himself as Brahma. The jiva attains mukti (liberation) when the jiva is restored to its natural state (maya is removed). Though other Vaishnavites (Ramanuja, Nimbarka, Vallabha, Caitanya) recognise only videhamukti (mukti after death), the Ekasarana preceptors have recognised, in addition, jivanmukti (mukti during lifetime). Among the five different kinds of videhamukti, the Ekasarana rejects the Sayujya form of mukti, where the complete absorption in God deprives jiva of the sweetness and bliss associated with bhakti. Bhakti is thus not a means to mukti but an end to itself, and this is strongly emphasised in Ekasarana writings—Madhavdeva begins his Namaghosha with an obeisance to devotees who do not prefer mukti.

=== Krishna is identical to Narayana ===
Narayana often manifests through avatars, and Krishna is considered as the most perfect one who is not a partial manifestation but Narayana himself. It is in the form of Krishna that Narayana is usually worshiped. The description of Krishna is based on the one in Bhagavat Puran, as one who resides in Vaikuntha along with his devotees. Thus the worshipful form is different from other forms of Krishna-based religions (Radha-Krishna of Caitanya, Gopi-Krishna of Vallabhacharya, Rukmini-Krishna of Namadeva and Sita-Rama of Ramananda). The form of devotion is infused with the dasya and balya bhava in the works of Sankardev and Madhabdev. Madhura bhava, so prevalent in the other religions, is singularly absent here.

== Four Principles ==
The cari vastu or the Four Principles defined this religious system are:

1. Naam – the chanting and singing the name and the qualities of God. In general, only four names are most important: rama-krishna-narayana-hari)
2. Deva – worship of a single God, that is Krishna.
3. Guru – reverence of a Guru, or Spiritual Preceptor.
4. Bhakat – the association or the congregation of devotees (bhaktas)

Sankardev defined the first, second and fourth of these, whereas Madhavdev introduced the third while at Belaguri when he accepted Sankardev as the guru for himself and for all others who accepted his faith. The four principles are revealed and their meaning explained at the time of initiation (xonron-lowa).

== Four Books: sacred texts ==
The single most important religious text is the Bhagavata, especially the Book X (Daxama). This work was transcreated from the original Sanskrit Bhagavata Purana to Assamese in the 15th and 16th centuries by ten different individuals, but chiefly by Srimanta Sankardev who rendered as many as ten Cantos (complete and partial) of this holy text.

Three other works find a special place in this religion: Kirtan Ghoxa, composed by Sankardev; and Naam Ghoxa and Ratnavali, composed by Madhavdev.

== Denominations ==
The different branches of the Ekasarana dharma, based on (Cantlie 1984:170). Note that the followers of Damodardeva and Harideva deny they took initiation from Sankardeva.

The religion fissured into four sanghati (samhatis or sub-sects) soon after the death of Srimanta Sankardeva. Sankardev handed down the leadership to Madhabdev, but the followers of Damodardev and Harideva did not accept Madhabdev as their leader and formed their own group (Brahma sanghati). Madhabdeva at the time of his death did not name a successor. After his death three leaders formed their own denominations: Bhabanipuria Gopal Ata (Kaal sanghati), Purushuttom Thakur Ata, a grandson of Sankardev (Purusa sanghati) and Mathuradas Burhagopal Ata (Nika Sanghati). They differ mostly in the emphasis of the cari vastus (four fundamental principles)

=== Brahma sanghati ===
The Brahma sanghati developed as a result of Damodardev and Haridev moving away from Sankardev's successor Madhabdev's leadership. Over time this sanghati brought back some elements of Brahminical orthodoxy. The vedic rituals which are generally prohibited in the other sanghatis are allowed in this sanghati. Brahmins too found this sanghati attractive and most of the Sattras of this sanghati have traditionally had Brahmin sattradhikars. Among the cari vastus, Deva is emphasised, worship of the images of the deva (Vishnu and the chief incarnations, Krishna and Rama) are allowed. Among the gurus Damodardev is paramount. Later on they came to call themselves Damodariya after Damodardev.

=== Purush sanghati ===
The Purush sanghati was initiated by the grandsons of Sankardeva—Purushottam Thakur and Chaturbhuj Thakur—after the death of Madhavdev. The emphasis is on Naam. Sankardeva has a special position among the hierarchy of Gurus. Some Brahminical rites as well as the worship of images is tolerated to some extent.

=== Nika sanghati ===
This sanghati was initiated by Badala Padma Ata, Mathuradas and Kesava Ata. The emphasis is on sat-sanga. This sanghati is called Nika (clean) because it developed strict codes for purity and cleanliness in religious matters as well as in general living, as laid down by Madhabdeva. Idol worship is strictly prohibited and it gives special importance to Madhavdev.

=== Kala sanghati ===
The Kala sanghati, initiated by Gopal Ata (Gopaldev of Bhavanipur) and named after the place of his headquarters Kaljar, placed its emphasis on Guru. The sattariya of this sanghati came to be considered as the physical embodiment of Deva, and the disciples of this sect are not allowed to pay obeisance to anyone else. This sect was successful in initiating many tribal and socially backward groups into the Mahapuruxia fold, and it had the largest following among the different sanghatis. The Dihing sattra, one of the large sattra's received royal patronage; but the largest sattra, Moamara, forged an independent path and the followers of this sect were responsible for the Moamoria rebellion against the Ahom royalty.

== See also ==
- Bhagavat of Sankardev
- Borgeet
- Kirtan Ghoxa
- Madhavdev
- Namghar
- Sankardev
- Satra (Ekasarana Dharma)
