= Madhavdev =

Indian writer

Personal life
- Born: May 1489 Leteku Pukhuri, Narayanpur
- Died: 1596 Bhela Sattra, Koch Bihar
- Honors: Venerated as Mahapurusha

Religious life
- Religion: Hinduism
- Philosophy: Vaishnavism

Religious career
- Teacher: Srimanta Sankardev

Madhavdev (May 1489–1596) is an important preceptor of the Ekasarana Dharma known for his loyalty to his guru, Srimanta Sankardev as well as his artistic brilliance. Initially a shakta worshipper, he was converted to Ekasarana Dharma by Sankardev and became his most prominent disciple. He became the religious as well as artistic successor of Sankardeva after the latter's death in 1568. He is known particularly for his book of hymns, the Naam Ghosa, as well as a large selection of songs called Borgeets.

== Biography ==
=== Early life in adversity ===
Madhavdev was born in May 1489 at Baligrama in Lakhimpur District of Assam to Govindagiri Bhuyan and Manorama. Govindagiri was a descendant of Hari Bhuyan, one of the Bhuyans who accompanied Candivara (Sankardev's forefather) in the 14th century as part of an exchange between Dharmanarayana of Gauda and Durlabhnarayan of Kamarupa-Kamata. Govindagiri became a Majinder at Banduka (in Rangpur District, in present-day Bangladesh) and established his family (wife and a son) there. On the death of his wife, he migrated to Bardowa Nagaon District, present-day Assam, and married Manorama of the Baro-Bhuyan clan. But due to warfare between the Baro Bhuyans and the Kacharis, he became homeless, and Harasinga Bora, an officer of the Sutiya kingdom, sheltered him at Letekupukhuri, where Madhavdev was born. Harisinga Bora arranged for Madhavdev's early education at Narayanpur.

A famine induced the family to move again, and the family was given shelter by a boatman named Ghagari Maji at Habung, a place near Dhakuakhana in Lakhimpur district. Here, Madhabdev's sister, Urvasi, was born. After about 10 years at Habung, the family rowed down the Brahmaputra river to Rauta-Tembuwani (present-day Bordowa), where Urvasi was married off to Gayapani, a Bhuyan. Soon after, Madhabdev accompanied his father back to Banduka (leaving behind his mother with his sister and brother-in-law), where he continued his education under a teacher named Rajendra Adhyapak. Here, Madhabdev became well versed in the Tantras, Tarka-shastra, Purana and other literature associated with Saktism. Soon after, his father, Govindagiri, died.

Leaving his half-brother (named either Damodara or Rupchandra), Madhavdev returned to his brother-in-law Gayapani with the news and stayed on, involving himself with trade in betel-leaf and areca nut. When his half-brother, who was a Majinder at Banduka, fell ill, Madhabdev returned there to shoulder his responsibilities. At Banduka, he received news of his mother's failing health, and he hastened back to Dhuwahat, where Gayapani had moved to along with his wife and mother-in-law after the Kacharis had uprooted the Baro Bhuyans.

=== Meeting with Sankardev ===
Madhavdev had grown into a staunch sakta in his learning and practice, and on receiving news of his mother's illness while in Banduka, he resolved to sacrifice two goats to propitiate the goddess. In the meantime his brother-in-law Gayapani had converted to Ekasarana and refused to procure the goats for the sacrifice. A debate ensued and Gayapani, now named Ramadasa, took Madhabdev to meet Sankardev to discuss the conflicts. The debate continued for four and a half hour, when Sankardev uttered a sloka from the Bhagavata Purana. Madhabdev was convinced and he accepted Sankardev as his guru. At the age of thirty-two, he joined his scholarship, literary and musical genius to the cause of Ekasarana dharma. Sankardev accepted him as his prana bandhava (friend of the soul). Madhabdev's conversion occurred in the year 1532. After his conversion, Madhabdev broke his betrothal and resolved never to marry.

Madhavdev turned out to be Sankardev's principal disciple, he moved with him like a shadow through thick and thin was intimately known to the Guru than any of his disciples. Sankardev before his near death, in an intimate talk with him in February–March 1568, appointed him as the next spiritual successor. It is narrated in Sakardeva's biographies that when Sankardev's son Ramananda approached him seeking spiritual instruction on his death bed, he directed him to Madhavdev on whom all his spiritual strength and energy devolved.

=== Pontiff ===
Madhavdev took charge of proselytizing activities and cultural traditions. In the first year of his pontifical tenure, a section of Vaishnava headed by Damodardev disacknowledge his leadership. Causing a schism, when called upon to explain he gave an unpleasant reply. Upon this Madhavdev severed all the connections with Damodardev.

Madhavdev during his tenureship got the opportunity to propagate the teachings of Shankara far and wide.

The Saint passed in 1596 at Madhupur Satra, Koch Bihar.

== Literary works ==
As an author and saint-poet, Madhavdev's contribution to his Guru's religion is immense. He is the author of the holy Naam Ghosa, (the book of the Lord's Name), which is as great a work as Sankardev's Kirtan Ghosa. This work is also known as the Hazari ghosa (the book of a thousand couplets). The English version of this book, subtitled as The Divine Verses translated by Soroj Kumar Dutta in 1997 in lucid verse. His other significant work is the Bhakti Ratnavali. He is also the author of many Borgeet 's (noble numbers) (191 of them) besides nine Jhumura's (one-act plays). His first literary work is Janma Rahasya, based on the creation and destruction of the world. Among his other outstanding contributions are Naam Maalikaa and the Assamese rendering of the 'Adi Kanda of Valmiki's Ramayana. His Guru Bhattima, the long poem of praise to his Guru, Srimanta Sankardev, is also very popular. He also composed a third chapter on having lost the two chapters composed by Sankardev, of the Kirtan-Ghosha titled Dhyana Varnana

Drama: Arjun Bhanjan (also known as Dadhimathan), Chordhara, Pimpara Guchowa, Bhumi Letowa, Bhojan Bihar. Except Arjun Bhanjan, his other dramas are called Jumuras.

Songs : Borgeet, Bhotima.
