= Satra (Ekasarana Dharma) =

Institutional centres associated with the Ekasarana tradition of Vaishnavism

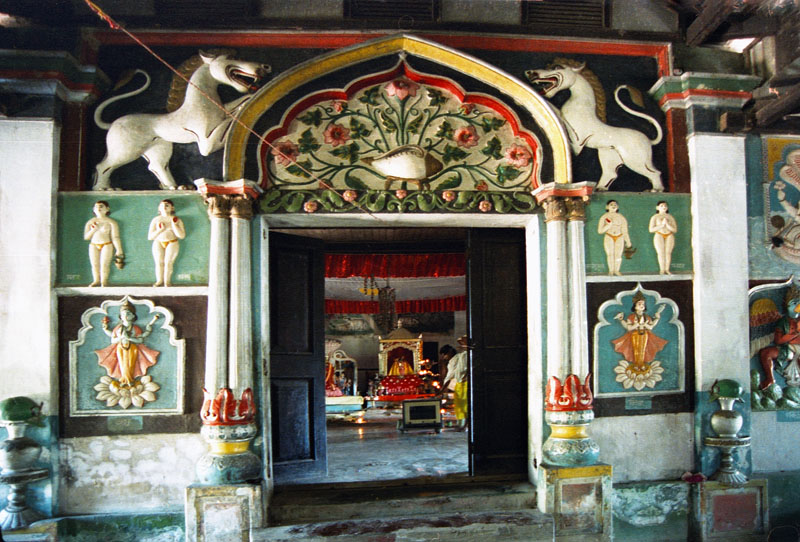
Sanctorium of the Dakhinpat Sattra in Majuli

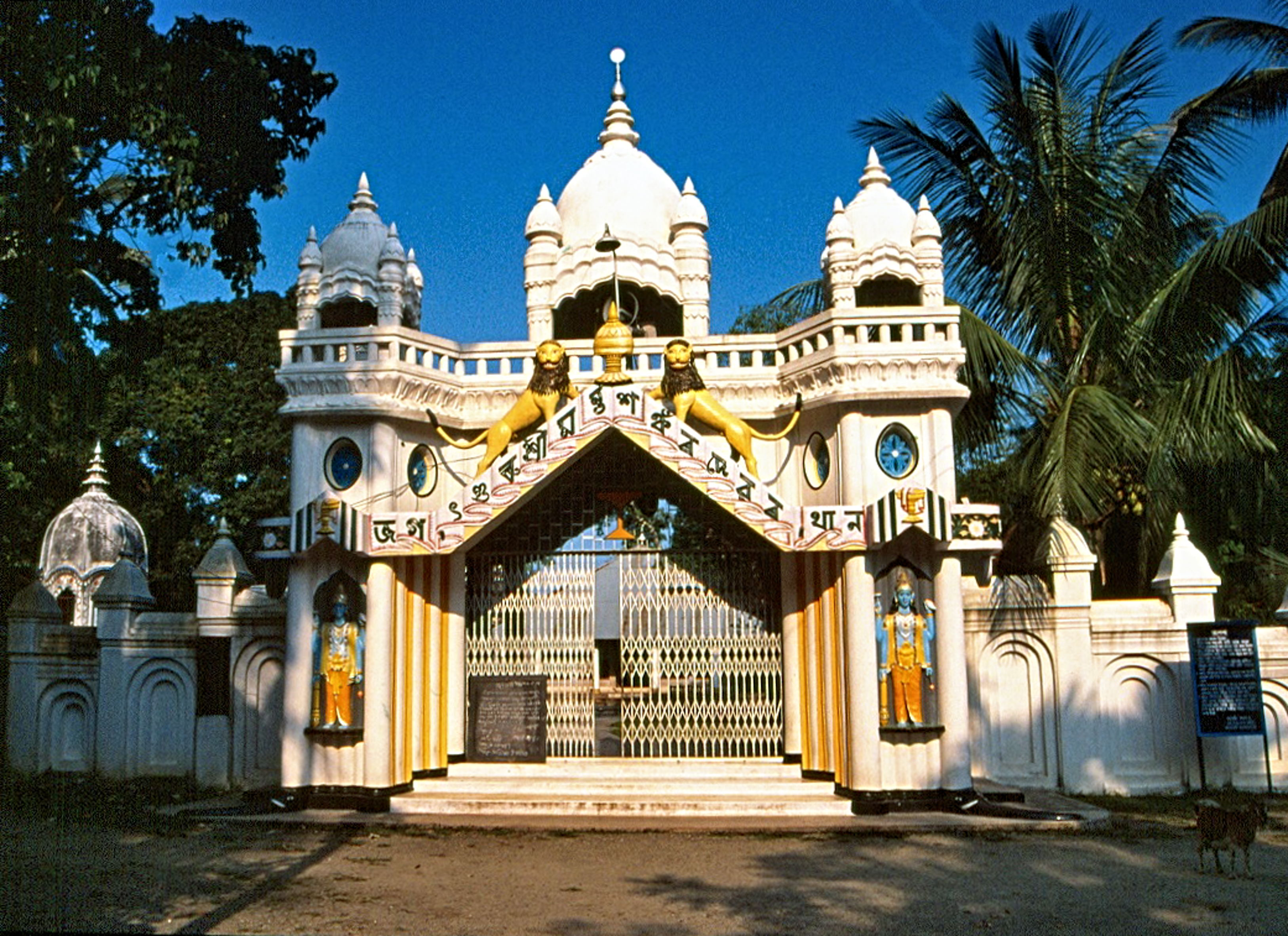
Sankardev Satra of Patbausi, Barpeta

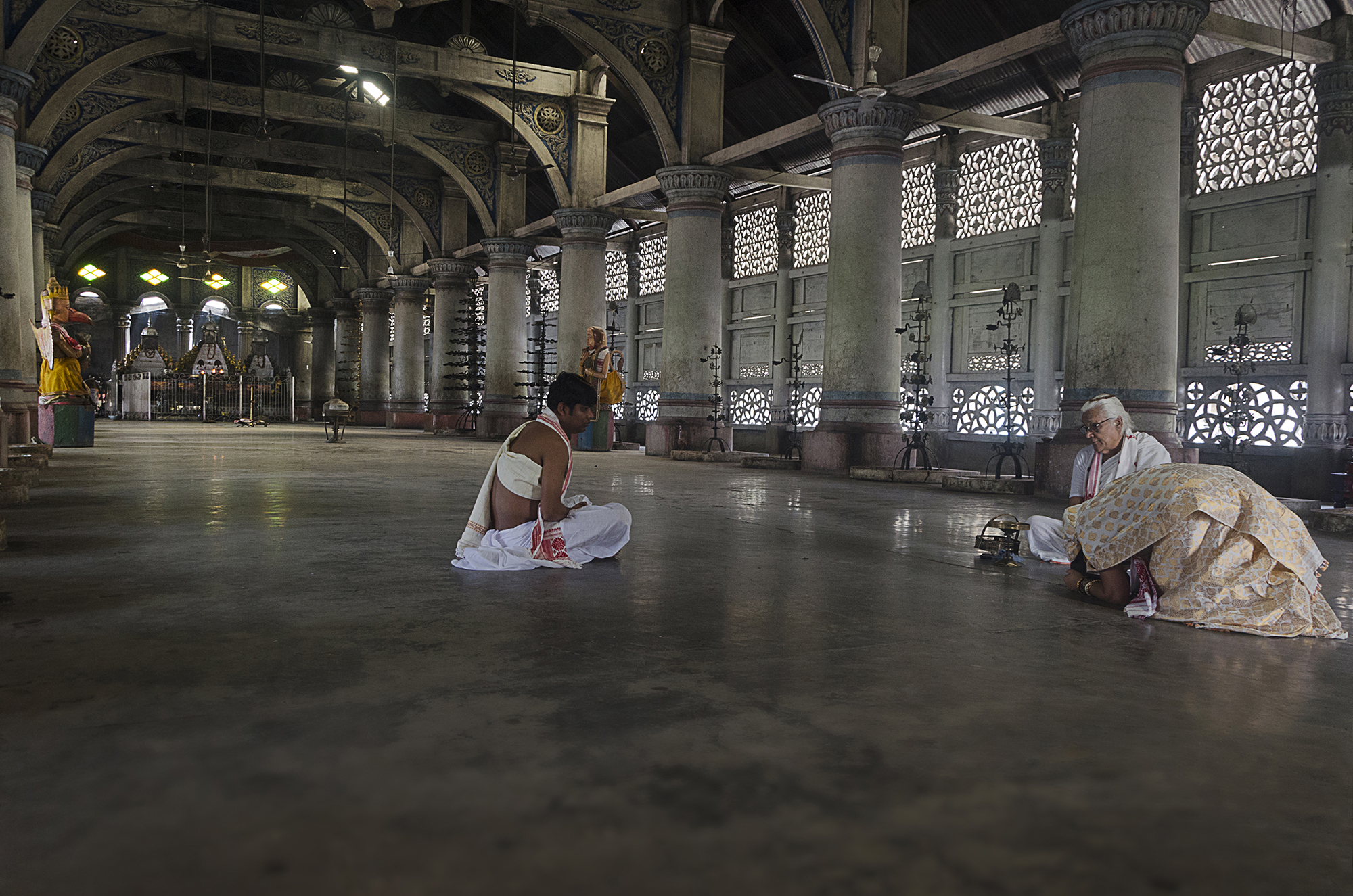
Interior of the Barpeta Satra Kitan Ghar, one of the principle satra of the Nika Samathi.

Satra (Note: Assamese pronunciation: [xɔtɹɔ].) are institutional centres associated with the Ekasarana tradition of Vaishnavism, largely found in the Indian state of Assam and neighbouring regions. Numbering in the hundreds, these centres are generally independent of each other and under the control of individual adhikara (or satradhikar), though they can be grouped into four different Sanghati (orders).

These centers, in the minimum, maintain a prayer house (Namghar, or Kirtan-ghar), initiate laypeople into the Ekasarana tradition, and include them as disciples of the satra from whom taxes and other religious duties are extracted. The Vaishnavite satra culture started in the 16th century. They grew rapidly in the 17th century, and patronage extended to them. First, the Koch kingdom, and later the Ahom kingdom, was crucial in the spread of the Ekasarana religion. Many of the larger Satras house hundreds of celibate and non-celibate bhaktas (monks), hold vast lands, and are repositories of religious and cultural relics and artifacts. The satra extend control over their lay disciples via village namghar. Satra, in which the principal preceptors lived, or which preserves some of their relics, is also called Thaan.

Another satra was established by King Samudrapal at a place known as Yogihati in the same period (1232 CE), as evident from a stone inscription found in Ambari [4]. The Vaishnavite satras were established by Assamese Vaishnavite monasteries for religious practices at the initiative of the Ahom Kings of Assam in the middle of the 17th century [web to propagate Vaishnavism [web Sankaradeva is said to have established his first satra at Bordowa, his birthplace, and then in different places of Assam.

Initially the satras were started as a part of the egalitarian movement of Eksarana Dharma; they later turned into a place of orthodoxy. From the early 20th century, the authority and orthodoxy of the Satras have been challenged by reform movements, most notably under the Sankar Sangha. The Satras coordinate some of their activities via the Asam Satra Mahasabha, an umbrella organization of all the Satras. According to the Mahasabha's count on its website, there is altogether a total of 862 Satras, including the Satras present in both the states of Assam and West Bengal.

== Structures ==
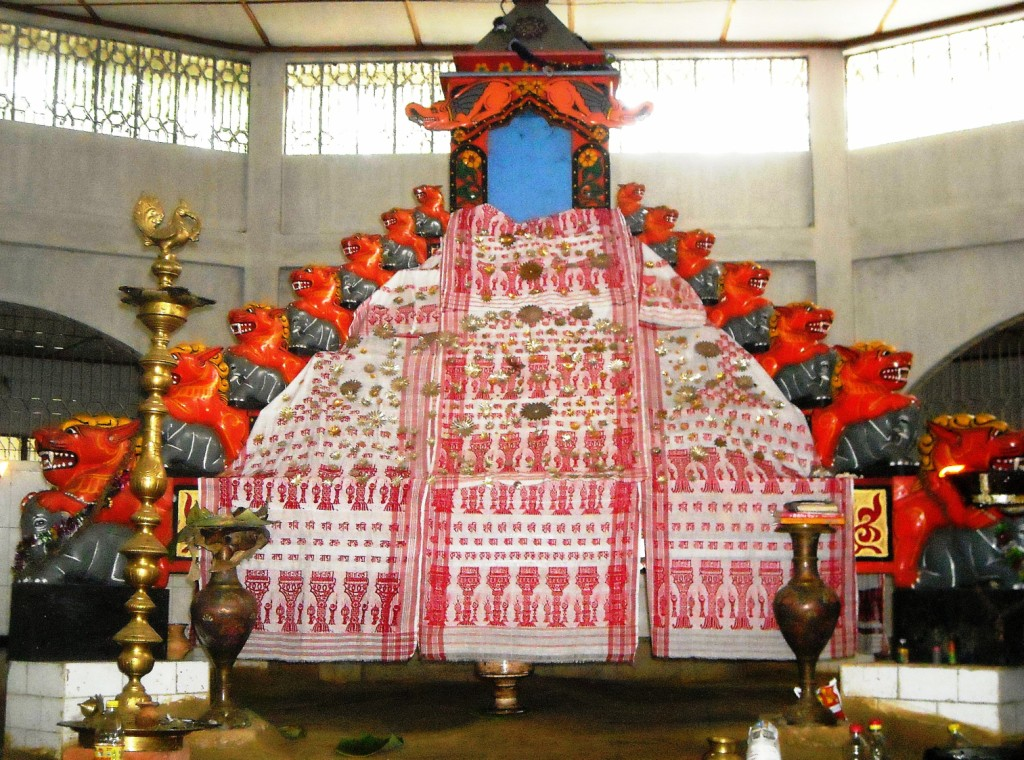
Guru Asana or Singhasan of Manikut, where the Bhagavata is placed. The seven lions on each elephant sum up twenty-eight representations of the seven heavens or Sapta Vaikuntha.

The Satra is generally a four-sided enclosed area with four gateways (karapat). Centrally placed in this enclosure is a rectangular prayer hall (Namghar or kirtanghar) aligned in the east–west direction. On its eastern side there is an additional independent structure called the Manikut (jewel house), the sanctum santorum, in which the asana (a wooden tetradehral structure with four carved lions) is placed, containing the main object of worship (usually a copy of the Bhagavad Purana in manuscript or an idol). The namghar is surrounded by four straight rows of huts, called hati, in which monks (bhakats) reside. The adhikara and other high officers of the Satra reside in the eastern hatis.

All structures were originally temporary, made with wood and bamboo, and covered over with thatch; brick and mortar were found in use after the 18th century. Monks, called bhakats, live in satras under a satradhikar or ⁣⁣Mahanta⁣⁣. Some orders of the religion, the bhakats, are celibate (kewalia bhakat). The satradhikar may not always be of high birth; it is recorded in many instances that the satradhikars belong to tribal or lower-caste origin. For example, Mathuradasa Ata, the first satradhikar of Barpeta, was from the Candal community, and Narayanadasa Ata, a disciple of Sankardev, was from the weaver community (Tanti). The Puranimati satradhikar was originally a Moran. Similarly, Sesa, Katani, Budhbari, and Chahila satras were held by Kaibartas, although they claim to be of Kayastha origin [8]. The satras are not merely religious institutions but play cultural and historical roles in society. A dance form that was initiated by Srimanta Sankardeva and later developed within the sattras, and thus called Sattriya, is one of the eight classical dance forms in India.

=== Origin and evolution ===
The name "satra" originates in the Bhagavata Purana in Sanskrit (sattra) and is used in the sense of an assembly of devotees. During Sankardev's lifetime, the devotees assembled in the open, under trees. Though temporary prayer houses were built, the tradition of devotees living in the premises did not happen during Sankardev's lifetime. The first mention of thehati is found in the context of the Patbausi Satra of Damodardev. Madhavdev built the Barpeta Satra and laid down the system of daily prayer service and initiated the system of religious tithes. Vamsigopaldev was instrumental in establishing Satras in eastern Assam.

The last quarter of the 16th century saw the satras divide into four different sects (also called samhati)—Brahmasamhati, Purusasamhati, Nikasamhati, Kalasamhati. These four sects were firmly established by the early 17th century.

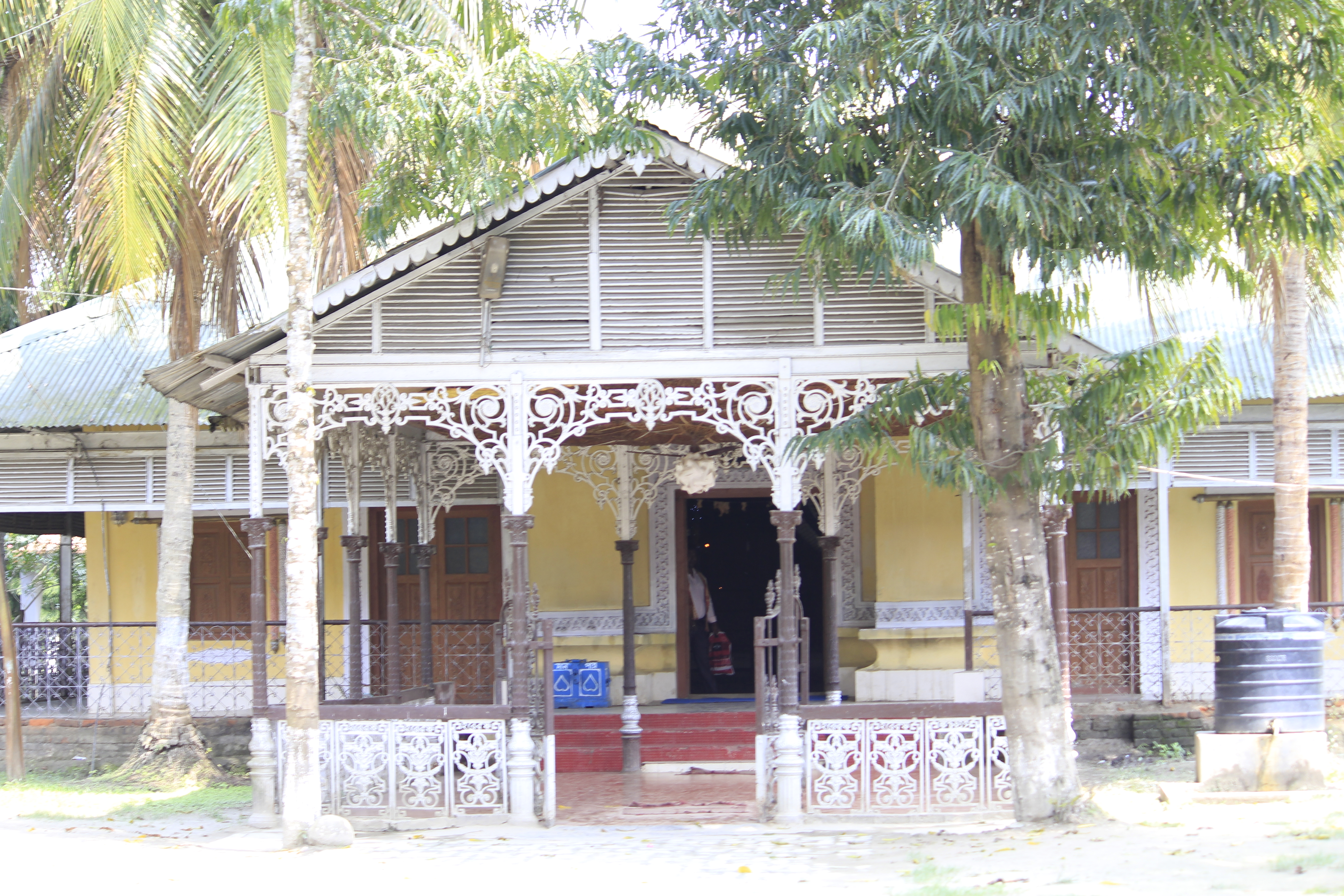
Namghar of the Auniati Satra, one of the principle Satra of the Brahma Samathi.

Damodaradeva (a Brahmin disciple of Sankardev) formed the Brahmasamhati, which represented the Brahmanical practices and ritualism. It brought back the caste system to its original form but still adhered to the teachings of the namadharma of Sankardev [10]. The followers of this sect called themselves Damodariyas (meaning "followers of Damodaradeva"), and the satradhikar was chosen from a Brahmin family. It had a close relationship with the Koches, and the Koch king Nara Narayan was initiated into the Vaishnava order by Damodaradeva. Auniati satra, Dakhinpat Satra, Garamur satra, and Kurawabahi satra became the most influential of the Brahmasamhati and received royal patronage from the Ahom kings.

Caturbhuja Thakur, one of the grandsons of Sankardev, headed the Purusasamhati. This samhati practiced the original features of Sankardev's teachings and was therefore considered to be the main sect. The head priest was chosen from either a Kayastha or Gossain family. The term purusa is claimed to be derived from the honorific title Mahapurusa, usually applied to Sankardev. Bardowa Satra, founded by Sankardev, remained the most popular satra of the Purusasamhati.

The next samhati, the Nikasamhati, was established by Mathuradasa and Padma Ata, both of whom were disciples of Madhavdeva. It strictly conformed to the teaching of Madhavdeva, and being a purist group placed more importance on ascentism. [16] Kamalabari Satra, Barpeta Satra, and Madhupur Satra are the three centers of this samhati. The last of the Samhati, the Kalasamhati, concerned with the tribal and lower-caste societies [17], represented the offshoots of six sudra satra and six brahmana satra formed by Gopala Ata and his followers during the late 16th and early 17th centuries. The Mayamara satra and Dihing Satra, the two most important of the sudra satras, admitted various local tribes into their fold—Kacharis, Kaibartas, Chutias, Morans, Ahoms, etc. [19] The Mayamara satra, formed by Aniruddhadev (a disciple of Gopala Ata), later became the most prominent among the six sudra satras of the Kalasamhati and revolted against the Ahom kingdom during the latter part of the 18th century.

The first three samhati—Brahmasamhati, Purusasamhati, and Nikasamhati—brought back caste rules and Brahmanical rituals, while the Kalasamhati rejected caste rules and idol worship in its entirety.

The Ahom kingdom initially resisted the ingress of religious preceptors; it finally endorsed the Satras, enabling them to establish themselves on sound economics, make themselves attractive to the laypeople, and spread the Ekasarana religion. The 17th century saw the rapid growth of the Eksarana Dharma in upper Assam [22], and Majuli became a focal point of Satra tradition and authority. The number of Satras grew during this period, with 125 Satras built in the 17th century and 85 Satras built in the 18th century, while suffering two major setbacks—the Moamoria rebellion and the Burmese invasion of Assam.

== Cultural programmes ==
Some of the cultural programmes, which are held in Sattras:

- Bhaona
- Doul Utsav or Deul
- Janmastami
- Rasa lila or Raas utsav

== See also ==
- List of Satras
- Sattriya
