= Aniruddhadev =

- Born: Harakhanthagiri; April 1553
- Died: 1626 (aged 72–73)
- Occupation: Ekasarana preceptor

Aniruddhadev (1553–1626) was a 16th-century Ekasarana preceptor from Assam. Born to a Shudra Kayastha Bhuyan named Gondagiri, Aniruddhadev was a disciple of Gopal Ata and the founder of the Mayamara satra of the Kalasamhati, the followers of which revolted against Ahom kingdom. who priotized the Brahmasamhati.

== Brief life ==
Aniruddhadev was born in the year 1553 in what is modern-day Assam. His father Gondagiri was a Kayastha Bhuyan and his mother Anjali Devi was the cousin of Kayastha Sankardev. At an early age he became a disciple of Gopaldeva for which he moved to Barpeta, where he spent three and half years for receiving religious teachings. After the completion of his studies, he came back to his place and founded a Satra at Bishnu-Bali Kuchi and started propagating the Vaishnava religion from the month of Magha (January/February) 1601.

Due to the frequent raids from the neighbouring tribes of the Daphla Hills, he shifted to Naha Ati, on the banks of Marnai river, present-day Lakhimpur district. Here he was successful in converting a large number of disciples into Neo-vaishnavism. He later moved to Majuli, on the bank of a lake called Moamara, where he established the Mayamara Satra. The democratic outlook and humanism of the Satra appealed to the nearby tribesmen who accepted him as a religious perceptor. The prominent tribes he converted were the Morans, Kacharis, Chutias, Borahis, Ahoms and professional caste like Brittial Banias.

Being a radical, Aniruddhadev's ideology of egalitarianism came in direct conflict with the right wing sub-sect ideology of the Bhakti movement and his concern for the lowers strata of society was not supported by members of the conservative class. The building of satras belonging to Brahmasamhati by the state (Ahom kingdom) and further demoting Aniruddhadev and his followers to the background led to a sense of alienation among them. Nevertherless, the egalitarian outlook of the Mayamara satra attracted a large number of followers from the tribal and marginalised section of the society and the news of Aniruddhadev's success soon reached the Ahom king Sukhaamphaa, who considered its growing popularity a threat to the Ahom state. Aniruddhadev was able to convince that his missionary work will bring no harm to the King's authority and after coming to an agreement was permitted to continue his activities.

Kayastha Aniruddhadev acknowledged his Sudra identity proudly which would be considered a big taboo in modern times . He writes " Sudrakule jata huya parhilo sastrak: Guru-vakye ciniloho Iswar Krsnak: Pitrye matrye Aniruddha nam dila: Kavicandra nam gota Dewane bulilā. Ram Saraswati nam nrpati dilanta: Bharatar pad mok kara bulılanta ".

Meaning: Being a Shudra he had committed the act of studying the scriptures. He found God Krishna by the mercy of his preceptor. His parents gave him the name of Aniruddha. Dewan ( Chilarai ) called him Kavicandra. Ram Saraswati was the title conferred upon him by the king himself who ordered him to make verses from the Mahabharat.

He later involved himself in scholarly pursuits and translated the Bhagavata Purana into Assamese and composed a work called Bhakti Mangal Ghosa. Aniruddhadev died at the age of 73 in the first week of December 1626.
