= Sri Sri Madhabdev Kalakshetra =

Madhabdev Kalakshetra
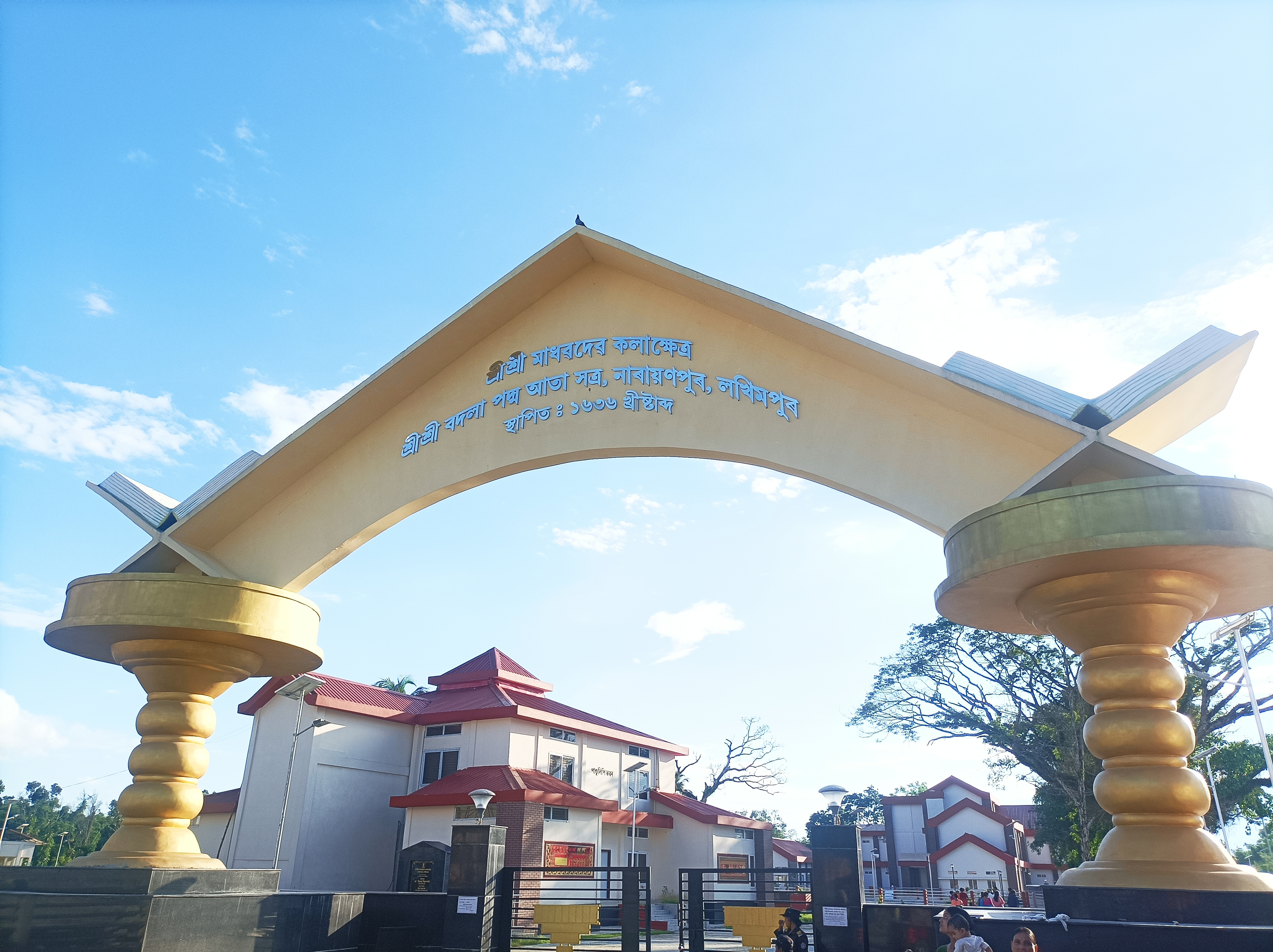
- Gateway of Madhabdev Kalakshetra
- Established: 10th May,2023
- Location: Narayanpur, Lakhimpur, Assam, India

Sri Sri Madhabdev Kalakshetra is a cultural institution in the Narayanpur area of Lakhimpur District, Assam, India, named after the medieval poet-playwright and reformer Sri Sri Madhabdev. The Kalakshetra is located on the premises of the Badla Padma Ata Satra, founded in 1636 by Badala Padma Ata, a disciple of Mahapurush Madhavdeva.

== History ==
The residents of Narayanpur had long advocated for the establishment of the Sri Sri Madhabdev Kalakshetra. The foundation stone for the cultural complex was laid on March 13, 2007, by then Chief Minister Tarun Gogoi. The site selected for the Kalakshetra was within the grounds of the Sri Sri Badala Padma Ata Satra, a Vaishnavite monastery founded in 1636. The Satradhikar of the Satra, Srikanta Goswami, donated approximately 48 bighas of land for the project. Despite the early initiation,the construction faced significant delays, with substantial progress occurring only after 2021. The Kalakshetra was eventually inaugurated on May 10, 2023, by Chief Minister Himanta Biswa Sarma.

== Photo Gallery ==
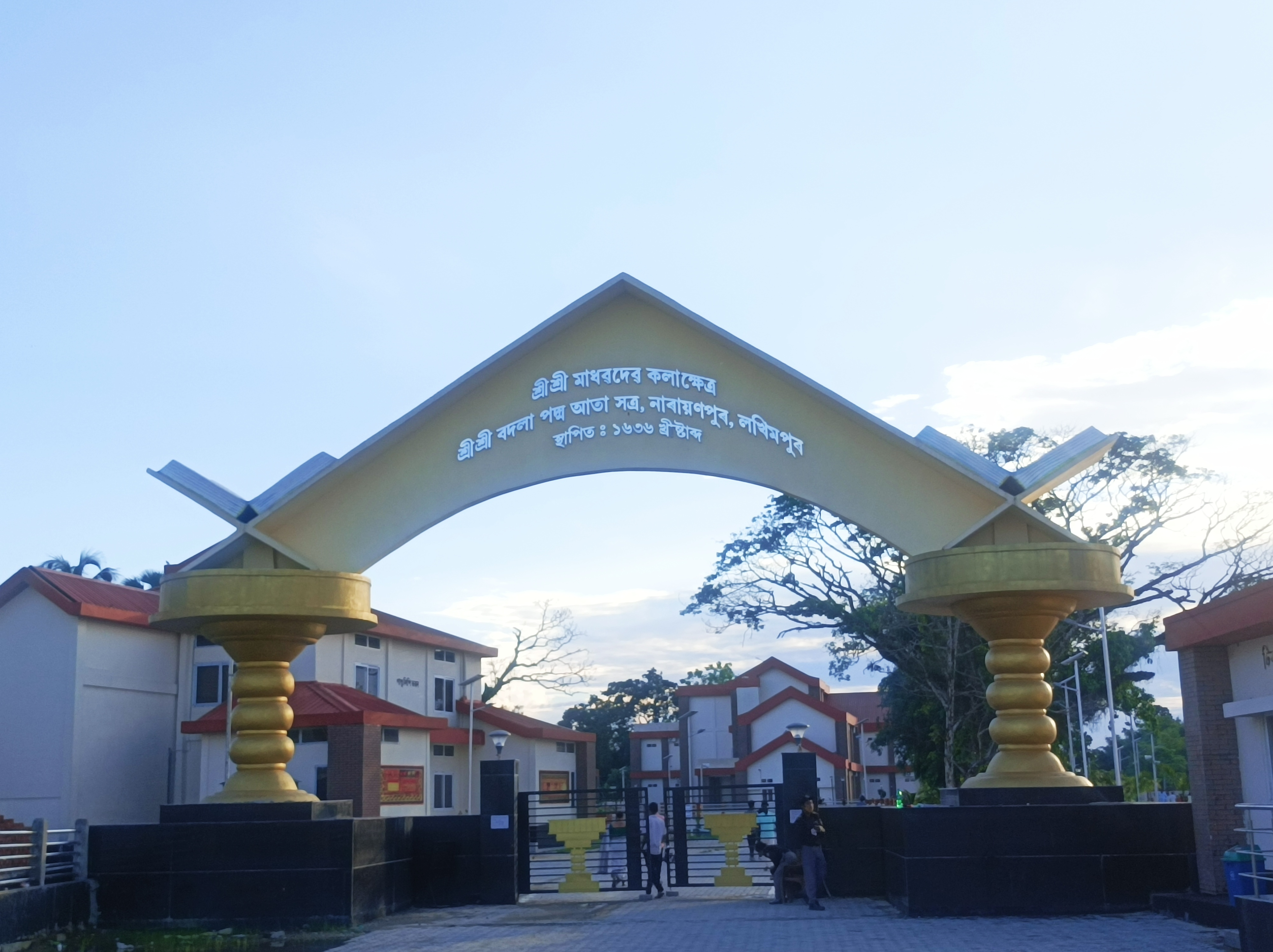
Entrance gate of Sri Sri Madhabdev Kalakshetra

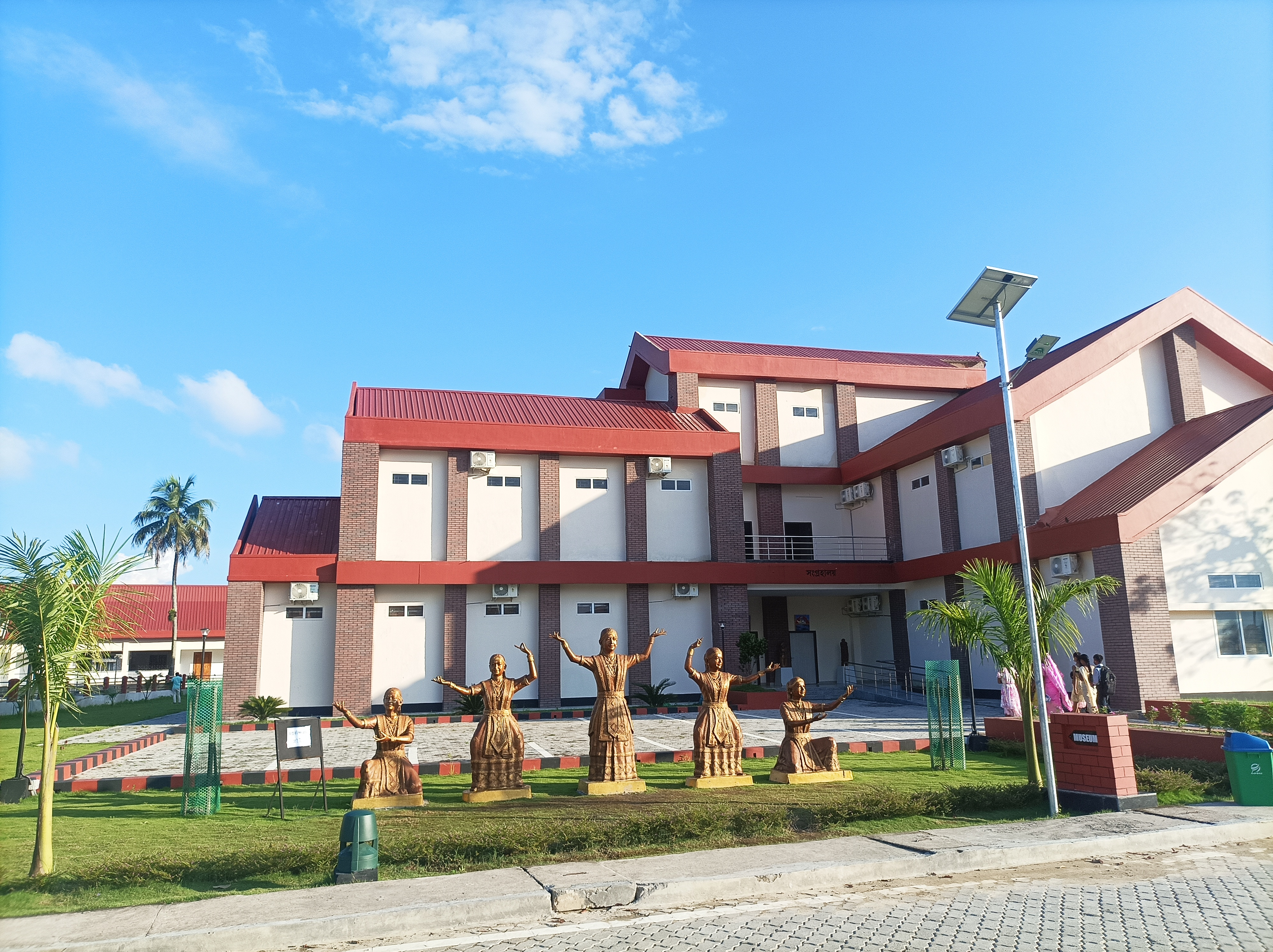
A building of Sri Sri Madhabdev Kalakshetra

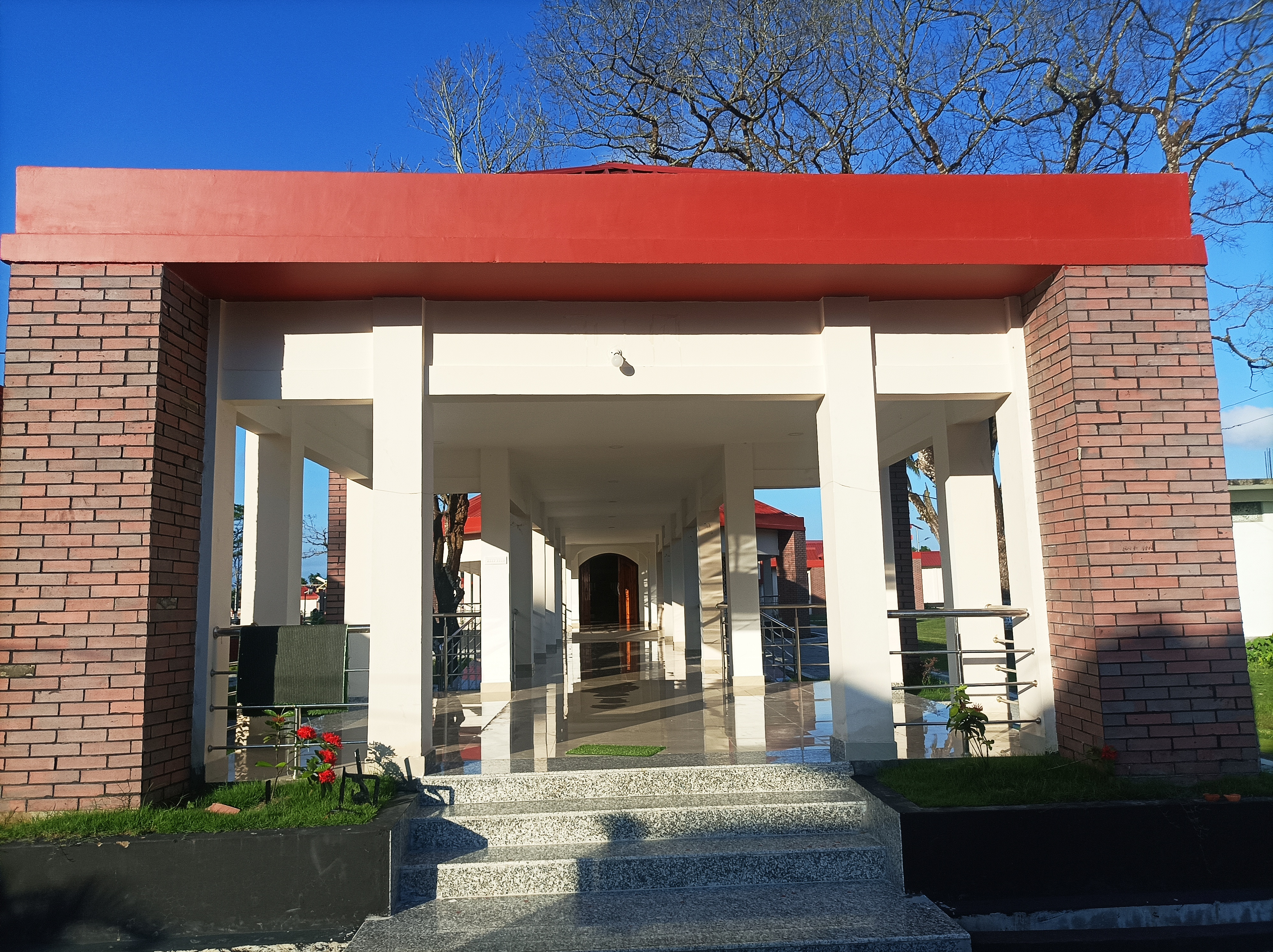
Entrance to Sri Sri Badala Padma Ata Satra

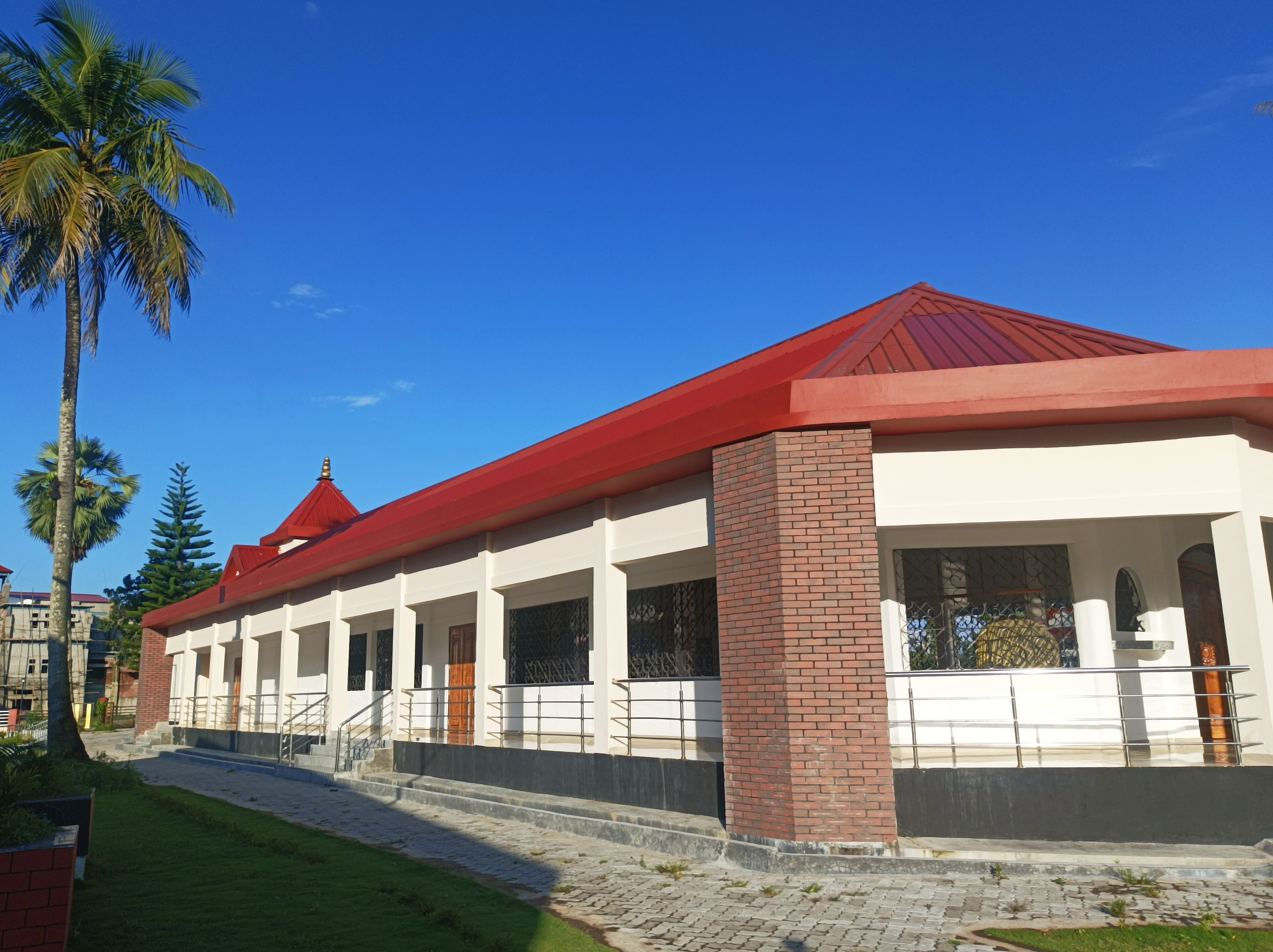
Side view of Sri Sri Badala Padma Ata Satra

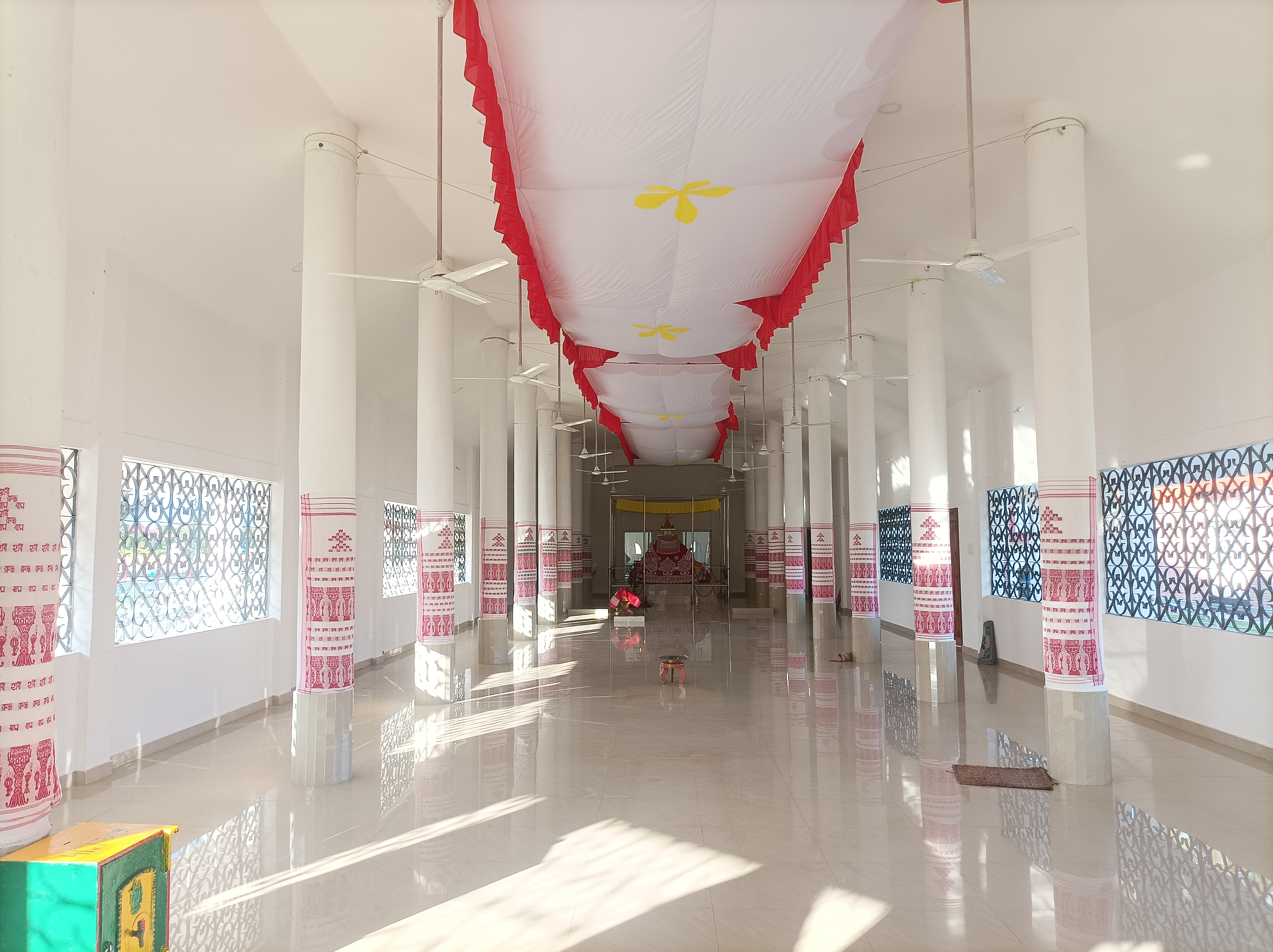
Interior view of Sri Sri Badala Padma Ata Satra

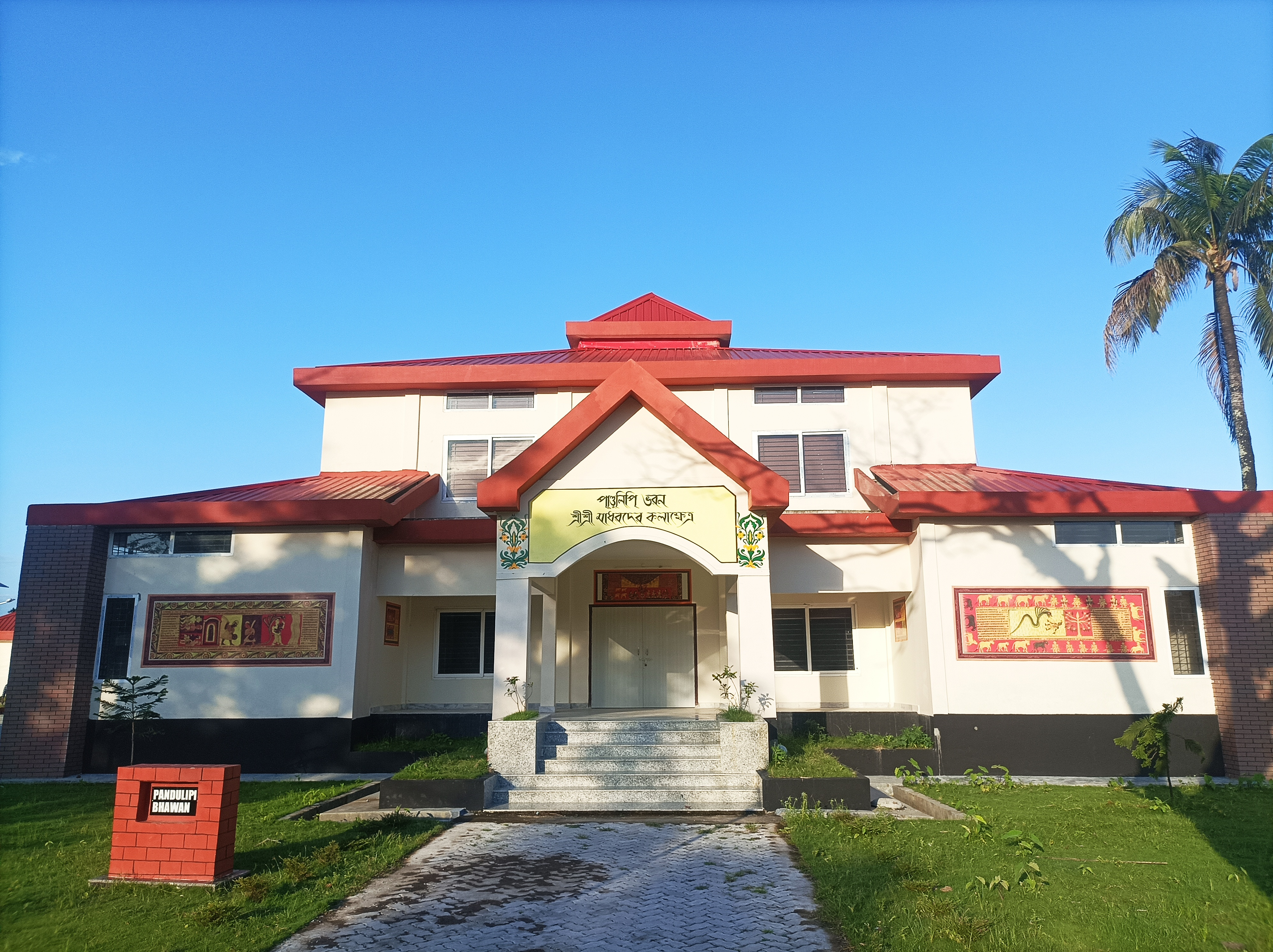
Manuscript Bhawan of Sri Sri Madhabdev Kalakshetra

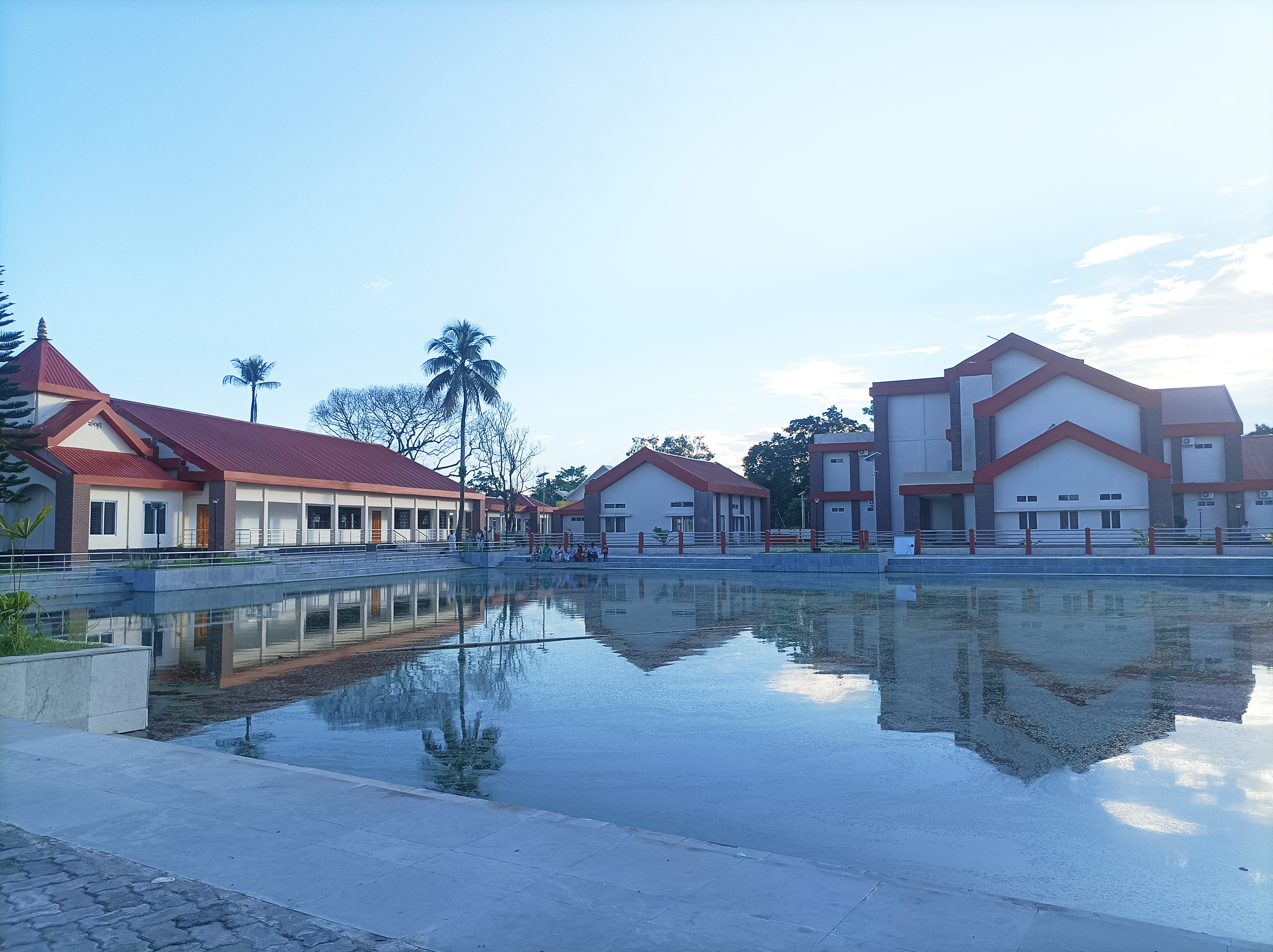
Interior view of Sri Sri Madhabdev Kalakshetra

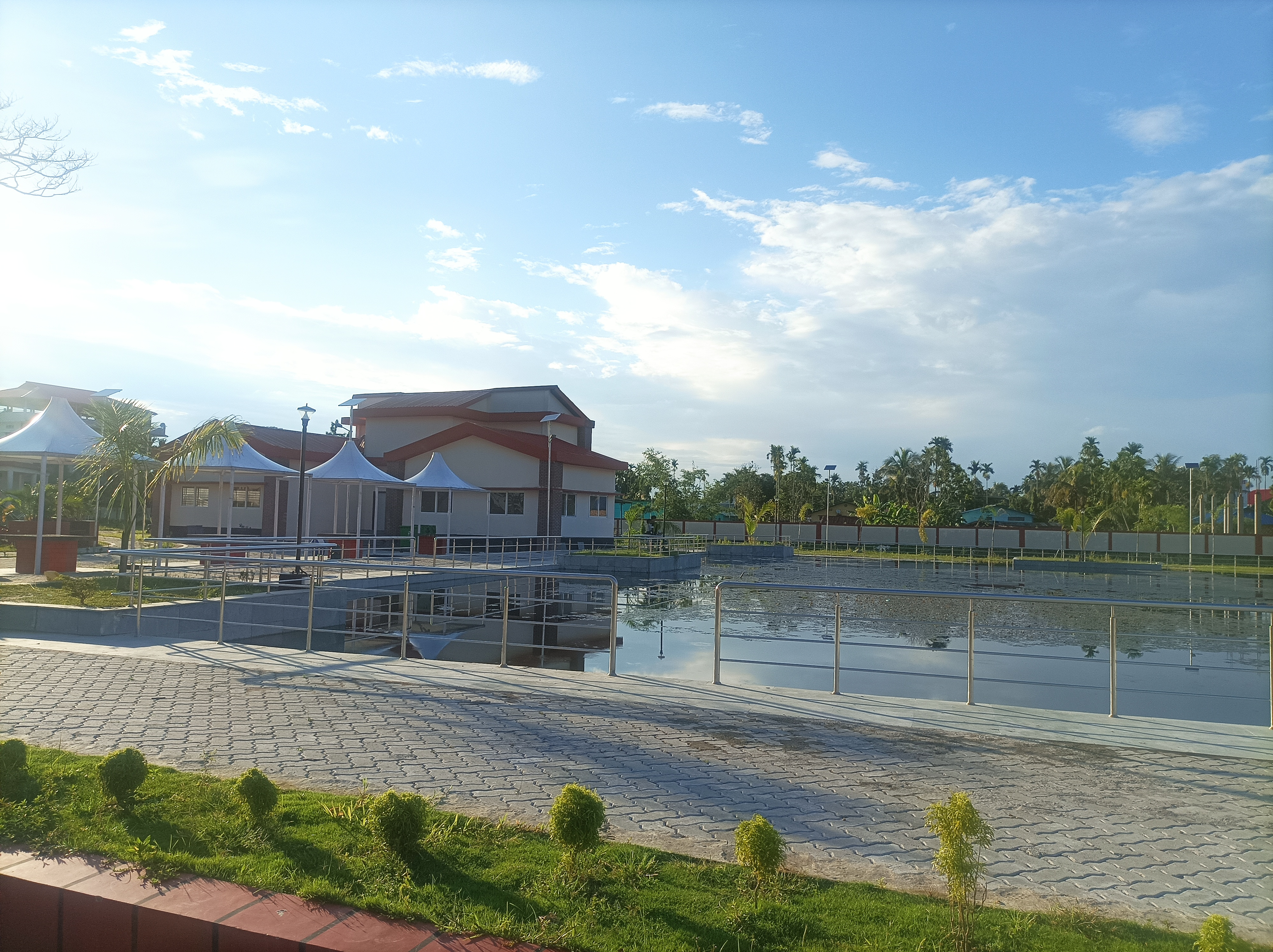
Interior view of Sri Sri Madhabdev Kalakshetra

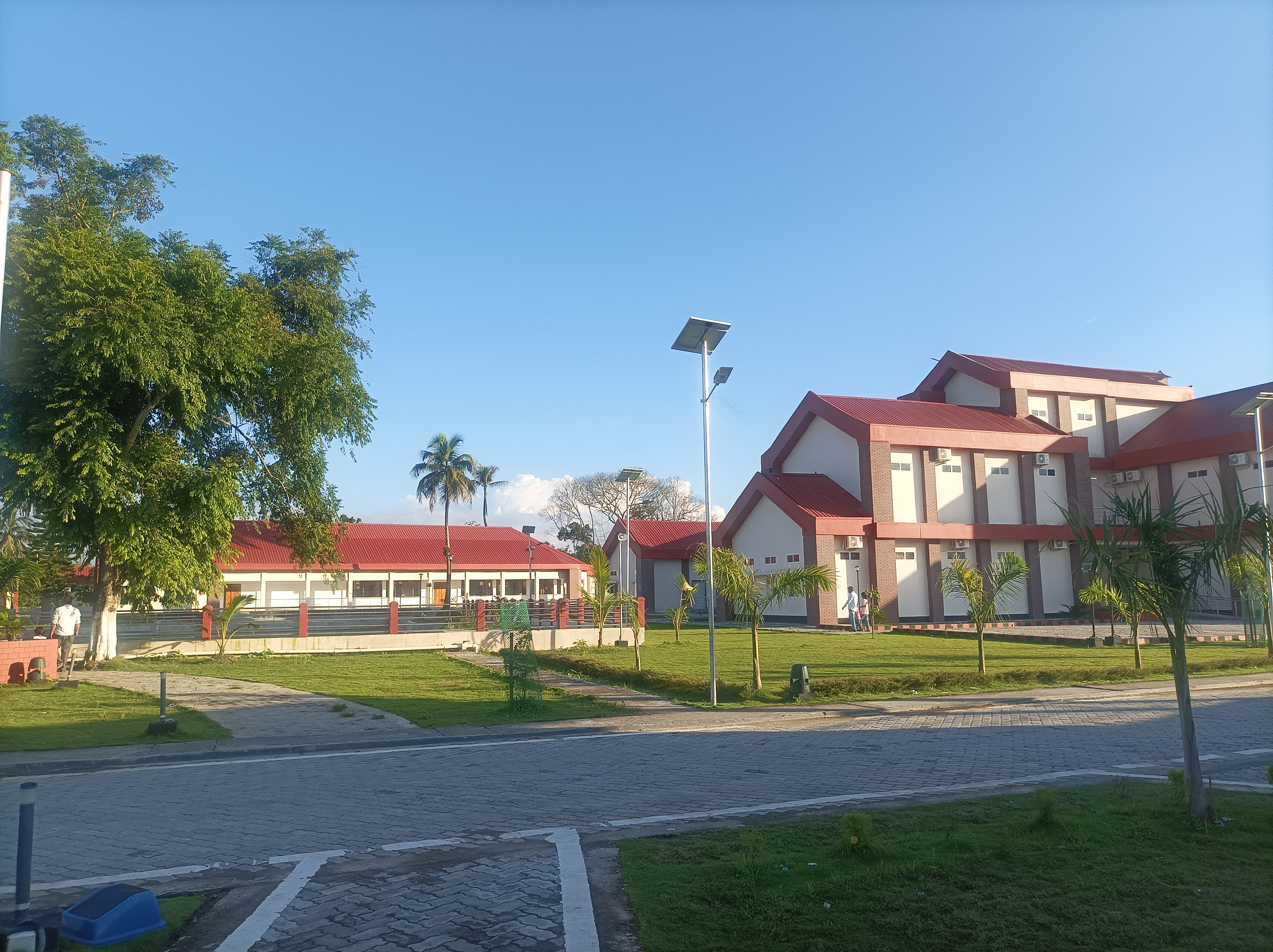
Interior view of Sri Sri Madhabdev Kalakshetra

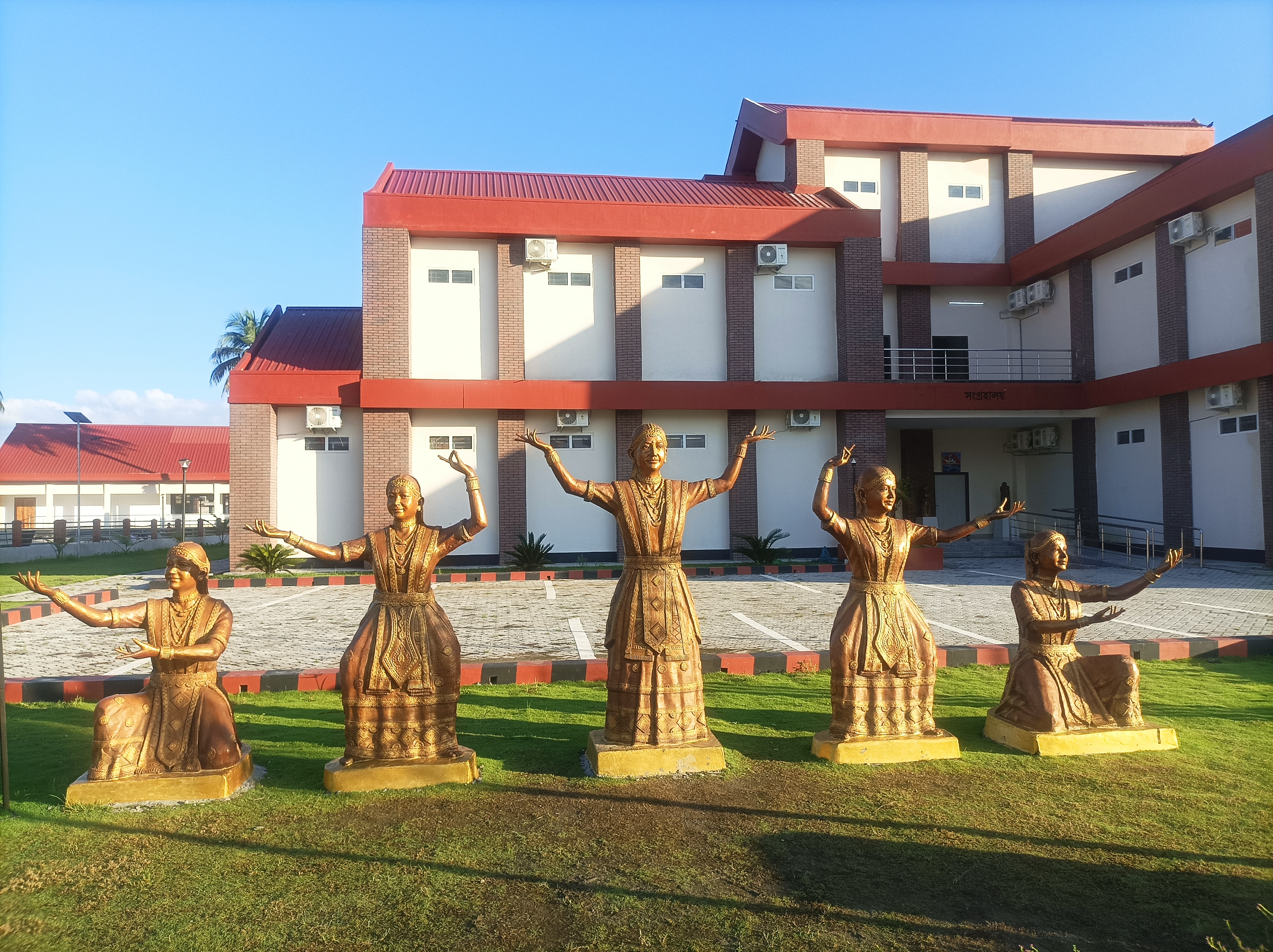
Interior view of Sri Sri Madhabdev Kalakshetra

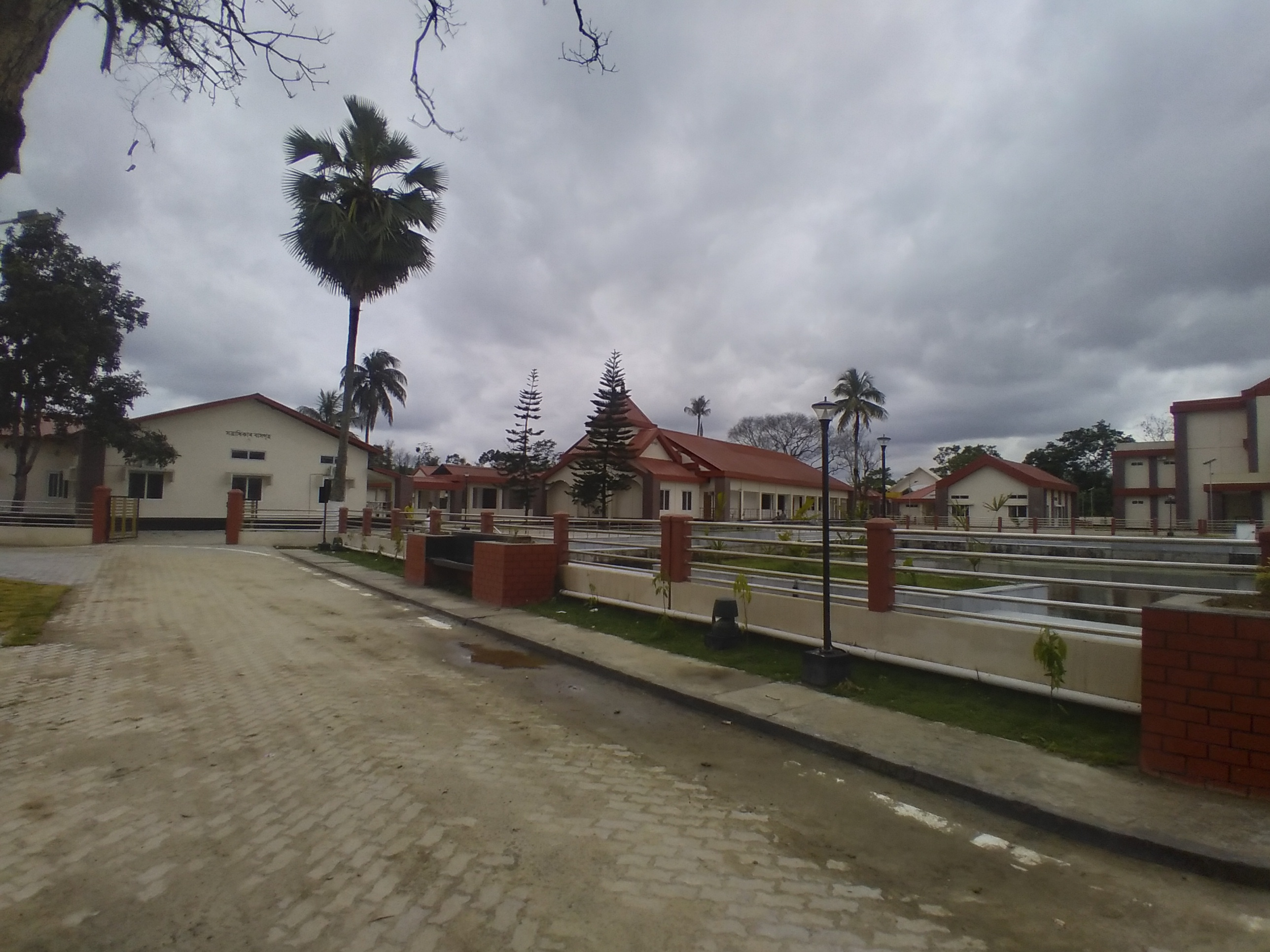
Interior view of Sri Sri Madhabdev Kalakshetra
