= Chutia people =

Ethnic group from Assam, northeast India

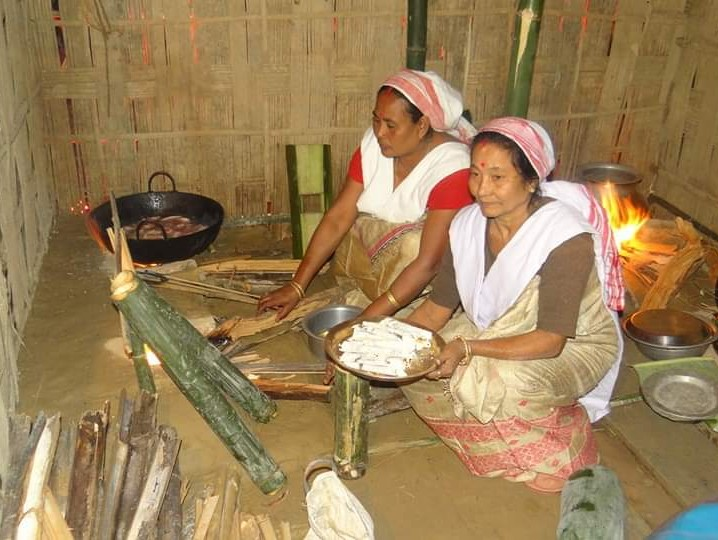
- Chutia women preparing pithas during Bihu/Bisu.

Regions with significant populations
- Predominantly in Upper Assam, Central Assam and in districts of Arunachal Pradesh; urban areas across Assam, India

Languages
- Assamese

Religion
- Hinduism (specifically Ekasarana Dharma)

Related ethnic groups
- Dimasa, Deoris, Sonowal Kacharis, Morans

The Chutia people (Pron: /ˈsʊðiːjɑː/ or Sutia) are an ethnic group that are native to the Indian state of Assam and historically associated with the Chutia kingdom. However, after the kingdom was absorbed into the Ahom kingdom in 1523–24, the Chutia population was widely displaced and dispersed in other parts of Upper Assam as well as Central Assam. They constitute one of the core groups that form the Assamese people.

A 2004 genetic study has found that in the "tribal" and "caste" continuum, the Chutia people occupy an ambiguous position in the middle, along with the Ahoms and the Rajbanshis. The historic Chutias originally belonged to the Bodo–Kachari group with some suspected Shan admixtures; nevertheless, it is estimated that their ruling families were originally either matrilineal or not entirely patrilineal. The Chutia people experienced Sanskritisation when the Chutia kingdom was extant, and later from Ekasarana dharma. They have also assimilated with other groups especially the Ahoms.

The Chutia community is recognized as an Other Backward Class by the Government of India. Currently there is a political movement to include the Chutia community in the scheduled tribes list of India. During the colonial period, the Chutia community had the second largest population in Upper Assam (east of Kaliabor). Today, most of them reside in this region of Upper Assam.

== Names ==
The origin of the name Chutia is not known: the Chutia kingdom was called Tiora in the Ahom language Buranjis, whereas the Assamese language ones used Chutia.

== Chutia kingdom ==
The Chutia kingdom emerged in early medieval times in eastern Assam on the northern bank of the river Brahmaputra and was one among other ethnic kingdoms—Ahom, Dimasa, Tripura etc. The inscriptions from the late 14th century suggest that by then the autochthonous kings were Hinduised in the Vaishnava tradition. The kingdom prevailed in the regions around Sadiya, its capital, in northeastern Assam and parts of Arunachal Pradesh. The kingdom primarily encompassed the present districts of Lakhimpur, Dhemaji, Tinsukia, and Dibrugarh in Assam.

It was absorbed into the Ahom kingdom in 1524 under Suhungmung. At the time of absorption, the kingdom was Hinduised with the caste system either marginal or prevalent. At the time of annexation, a section of Chutias were hinduised, those that were not were later initiated into the Ekasarana dharma under the Mayamara Satra in the 17th century. The capital region became a frontier province of the Ahom kingdom under the Sadiya-khowa Gohain, and the nobles were widely dispersed in Upper Assam.

== Religion ==
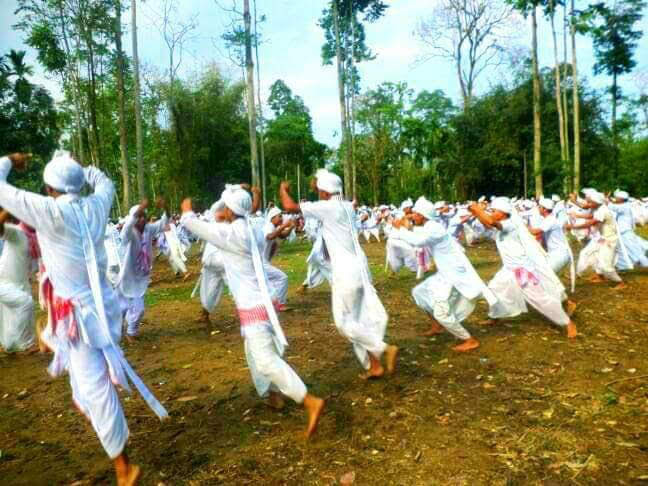
Chutia Dharma Husori performed in Borgaon, Tinsukia

The Chutias worshipped a primordial male deity and a primordial female deity. The male was called Kundimama, Balia-Baba or Pisha-dema, known by the Kacharis as Bathau or Bathau Brai and the female deity was called Kechaikhati or Pisha-si. The worship of the tribal goddess Kesai Khaiti, commonly found among other Bodo-Kachari groups The worship of the goddess Kechaikhaiti was officiated by the priestly section that came to be today identified as the Deori people; and other Bodo-Kachari peoples had their respective priests who too were called Deori.

Another god and goddess were the Bura and Buri or the "Old Ones." which under later Hindu influence became Shiva and Shakti.

=== Sanskritization ===
The settlement of Brahmins in the kingdom led to the Hinduisation and legitimisation of the Chutia rulers and the rulers claimed their divine descent from the Asuras. The term Asura is used to refers to the Non-Aryans and their otherness in forms of custom, including marriage, and property.

Following the emergence of ekasarana namadharma in the 16th century, and after the fall of the Chutia kingdom, a new Hindu lineage was constructed for the Chutias and in this lineage, the Chutias claim to trace their origin to the legendary king of Bhishmaka of Vidarbha. The association of the legend with the Chutia polity led to a widespread renaming of the region.

A section of Chutias were hinduised at an early period, those that were not were later initiated into the Ekasarana dharma under the Mayamara Satra in the 17th century by Aniruddhadev.

== Language ==
Chutia
- Native to: India
- Region: Assam
- Ethnicity: Chutia
- Extinct: (date missing)
- Language family: Sino-Tibetan: Tibeto-Burman; Chutia

Language codes
- ISO 639-3: None (mis)

The Chutia people speak the Assamese language today—the original Tibeto-Burmese language spoken by them has disappeared. In the 19th century, a British colonial officer, W B Brown, erroneously identified the Deori language as the original language of the Chutia people, This confusion, scholars assume, arose since the Deoris served as priests in the Chutia kingdom, but the Deori community today is not related to the Chutia community ethnically or linguistically. Linguists have noted that the Deori language has linguistic features that resulted from contact with other linguistic groups in places where the Chutia were never present.

== Society ==
=== Social life ===
Chutia people generally live in joint families. The number of members in a joint family at times exceeded one hundred. The father is the head of the family. Household duties are discharged by the family members with mutual understanding and co-operation, on a rotatory basis.

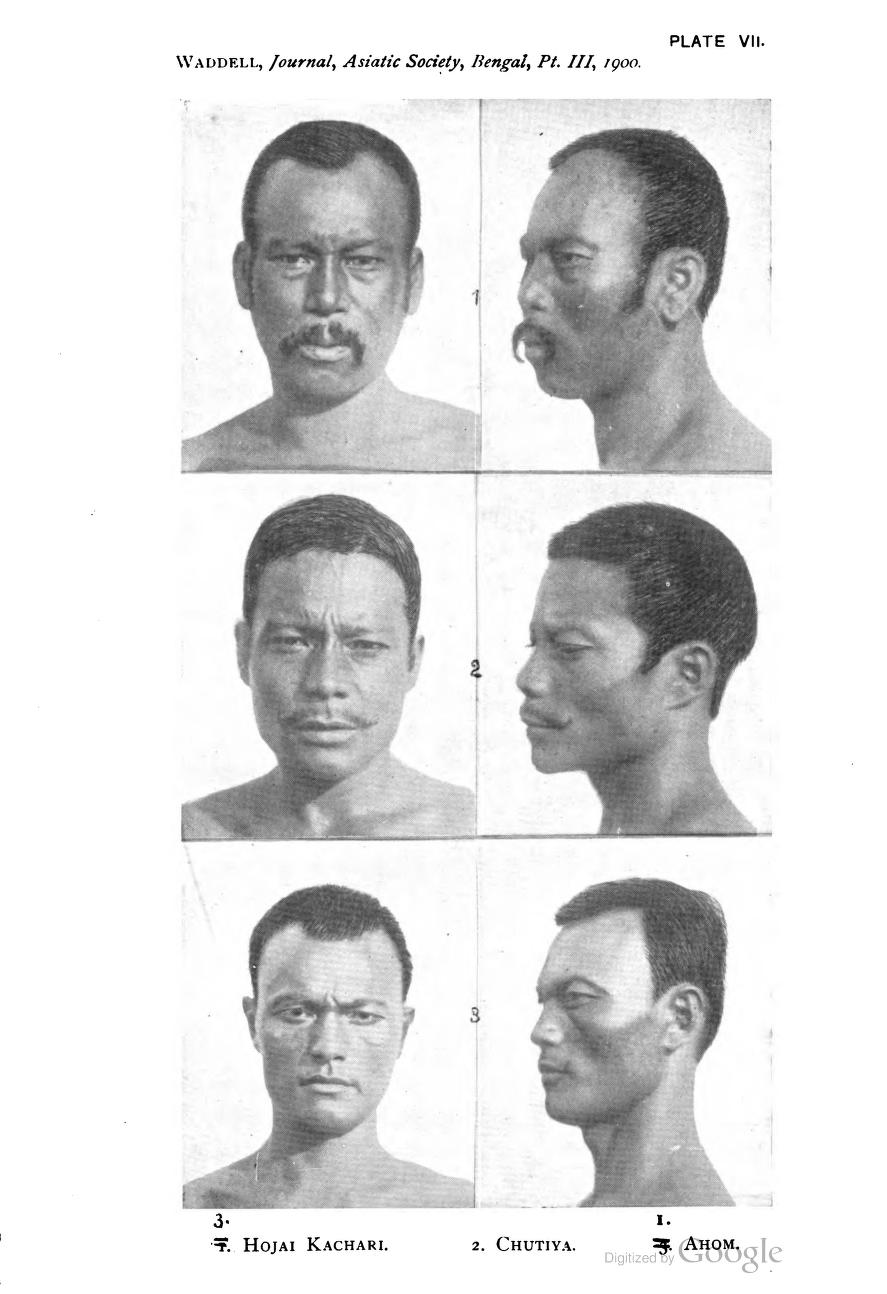
Photos from 1900 showing the typical face of a Chutia man(centre).

=== Historical divisions ===
After the fall of the Chutia kingdom, the Chutia people were divided into different groups due to circumstances based on either religious inclinations or associations with other communities. Over time, Chutias divided into five important groups:

Hindu Chutia
The Hindu Chutias represented a large section of the population. These are the Chutias who were initiated by Vaishnavite saints like Shankardev, Madhavdev into Vaishnavism sect of Hinduism. They are popularly termed as Kesa-ponthi as they have been imposed certain restrictions like the use of animal meat and alcohols in their rites by the Vaishnavite community. The other group Poka-ponthi have retained their tribal customs in their original form.

Ahom Chutia
Among the Pokaponthis, the Ahom Chutias formed the major sub-division. They were termed as such as they intermarried with the Ahoms. Most of them have been absorbed into the Ahom fold over time. They held various position in the Ahom kingdom's administration as seen with Langi Panisiya Borphukan, Rupchandra Borbarua, Kirtichandra Borbarua, Piyoli Borphukan, Badanchandra Borphukan, Piksai Chetia Borphukan, Phrasenmung Borgohain (during Suhungmung's reign), Thumlung Borgohain (during Rudra Singha's reign), Banrukia Gohain(during Susenpha's reign), Banlungia Gohain (during Rudra Singha's reign) and many more. Even during Sukapha's reign, many Chutia families like Som-chiring and Changsai were absorbed into the Ahom fold. Majority of Ahoms of the Chetia clan as well as the Lahon clan originated from the Chutia community. The Assam Gazetteers (1905) records that the Ahom-Chutias practised the Chaklong marriage rite, indicating that the Ahom-Chutias were fully absorbed into the Ahom social and cultural fold.

Borahi Chutia
It is believed that the Borahi Chutias were a sub-group of Chutias who had certain religious rites different from other Chutias. The Buranjis mention classes (khel) like the Naoboicha and Hiloidari as being originally Chutias and included in the Borahi fold. Moreover, the Tai word used for the Borahis was Kha-lang with kha used by the Ahoms to refer to the people who were not associated with wet rice cultivation. Although most of them were absorbed into the Ahom group, some of the Chutias living in Dhemaji, Golaghat and Sibsagar districts still identify themselves as Borahi-Chutias.

Miri Chutia
Miri Chutias were the Chutias who lived in the bordering villages of the northern bank of Brahmaputra and fled to the Miri hills during the Ahom advent. They intermarried with the Mishing and were subsequently absorbed by the later. They chiefly belonged to the Bihiya, Buruk (Medok) and Bebejia clans. In several villages, Mishing families still offer annual homage of 'Jal-Pinda' to some Chutia Mine or Chutiya grandmother which indicates that these people were originally Chutias. In the past, these descendants of the Chutia aristocracy also wore their hair long, contrary to the usual custom of the Mishing tribe; this they said was the privilege of the royal family. One of the two groups among the Mishing tribe, the Barogram, were referred to as Chutia-Miri, which indicates that these Mishings were earlier subjects of the Chutia kings. The Buranjis, on one occasion, record that a group of Miris living near the Dikrong River had earlier been subjects of the Chutia kingdom and were required to serve as Hatighahis (suppliers of grass for royal elephants) under the Chutia kings.

== Traditional attire ==
=== Male attire ===
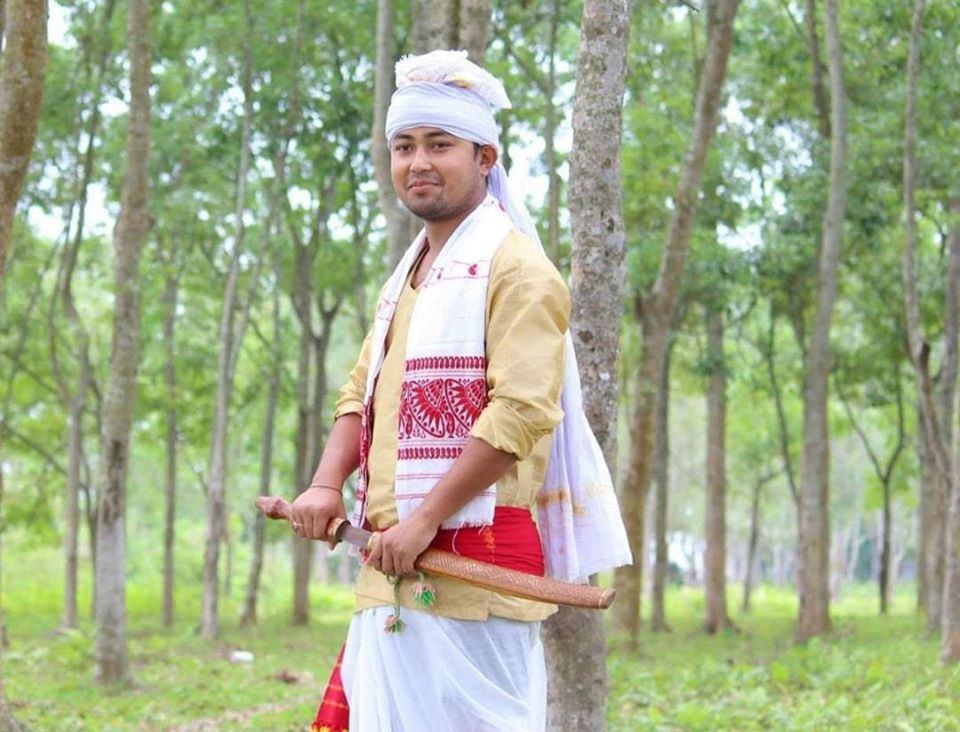
A Chutia man in his traditional attire

The traditional attire of the Chutia men includes the Chutia paguri (headgear), Chutia sula (shirt), Churia (lower garment), Gamusa/Bisuwan (scarf), Cheleng sador (Shawl) and Tongali (waist scarf). The royals and the rich in the past wore clothes made out of Muga and Paat Silk, whereas the ordinary class wore Cotton (summers) and Eri Silk (winter). The royals also used other clothing items like the Panikamoli cloth as well as the Aruwan. In the ancient times, royal men wore jewelry items like Longkeru (Earrings), Mota Moni (necklace) as well as golden footwear (Paduka). The royals also used silk umbrellas with gold embroidery known as Gunakara.

Some components of the male attire include:

- Chutia paguri

There were several types of Chutia headgears or paguris in the past as per the style of tying the knots. The three primary types are Xatphul/Sarpa Paag, Ronuwa/Junga Paag and the Enajori Paag. Out of this, the Xatphul and Enajori paguri are still worn. The Xatphul type is worn by the priests and is snake-shaped; hence the name Sarpa (snake). Today, the Chutias use this type as their traditional Chutia headgear. The Ronuwa type was worn in the battle field and can be seen in the terracota plates of Bhismaknagar as well as the Tamreswari Temple.

- Churia (Churu-Isa)

The Chutias often wear their Churia (dhoti) short (till the knees). The Churias used by Chutia men are very well depicted in the terracota plates of Bhismaknaagar as well as the Tamreswari temple.

- Gamusa and Bisuwan

The Gamusa is an important part of the Chutia attire and is used as a scarf. The Bisuwan (Bisu meaning "Bihu" and Wan meaning "textile") is a variant of the Gamusa used during the Bihu/Bisu festival. The difference between the Gamusa and the Bisuwan is mainly the design and use. Although both the scarfs consist of red side borders, the Bisuwan consists of floral patterns as cross border at one end, instead of the regular plain red cross borders of the Gamusa.

- Tangali

The Tangali is a waist wrapper worn by males or used as belt to gird the waist. In the past, a white Tangali was worn by warriors in the battlefield which would turn red with blood on their return. This symbolism later made way for the red Tangali which is worn by young boys when they perform Bihu Huchori. The two ends of Tangali are trimmed with fringes and ornamented with floral motifs of coloured threads. The Tangali can be seen in the terracota plates of Bhismaknagar as well as the Tamreswari temple.

- Cheleng Chador (Cheleng-Isa)

The Cheleng Chador is another important component of the Chutia attire. It is usually wrapped around the shoulders similar to a shawl and is about 9 feet in length.

=== Women attire ===
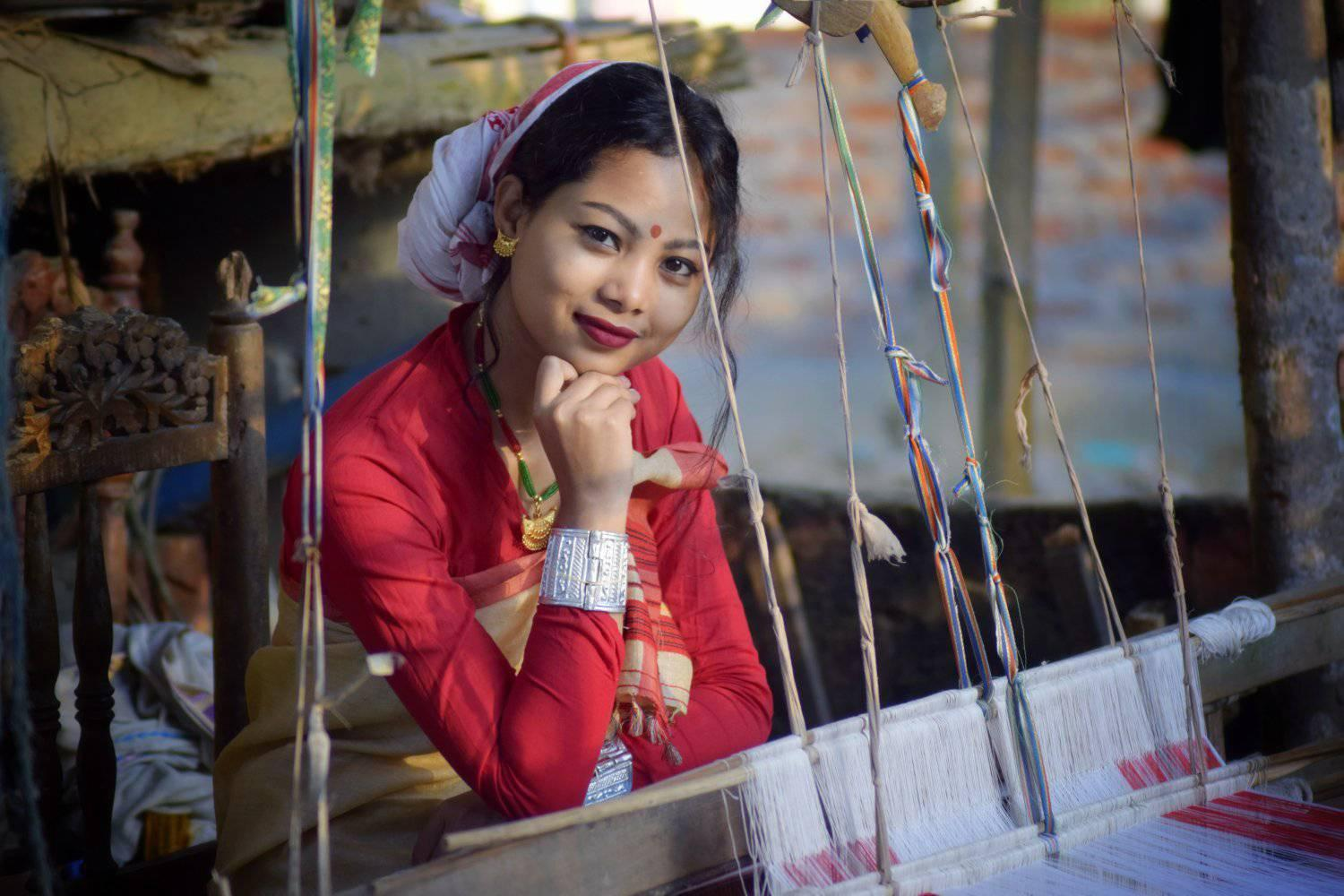
A Chutia girl in her traditional attire Riha (Methoni), Mekhela, Chula, Gatigi and ornaments Gam kharu, Madoli and Junbiri.

Among the Chutia people, women of every age group have their own unique clothing style. Girls until puberty wear a Gamusa called Baiga as an upper garment and a Mekhela/Igu as a lower garment (waist to ankle). In the olden times, it was either made of Muga/Paat (affluent class) or cotton (common class). After puberty and until marriage, the girls wear a Riha/Risa (chest wrapper) instead of Baiga as the upper garment. This custom of changing the clothing style after puberty is a tradition of the tribe. During marriages, the brides wear a Paat/Muga Riha along with Mekhela and Chador. The Dukothia, Chador and the Kokal-mora are signs of marriage. The brides also wore Harudai Jaapi as headgear in the past. A married women usually wears a mekhela, kokal-bandha (waist wrapper) as well as Gathigi (headgear) and a Chador to cover their head. The Mekhela of married women is a longer cloth which is worn up to their bosom unlike that of girls worn from the waist and downwards. The Riha of women is worn only on special occasions like Bihu, marriage ceremonies, temple visits, rituals, etc. Chutia traditional ornaments include Madoli (Chutia word), Dugdugi (Chutia word), Junbiri,‌ Thuria, and Gam-kharu.

Some components of the female attire include:

- Mekhela (Igu)

The Mekhela is the most important component of the Chutia female attire. Until marriage, girls wear the mekhela from the waist downwards, which is later tied up to the bosom after marriage. Another cloth called Kokal-bondha (waist wrapper) is also worn above the mekhela by married women. The Chutias consider the red-embroidered Dabua-Bosa Mekhela to be their symbolic attire. Apart from the primary Dabua-bosa design, the Mekhela also consists of Buta-bosa and Phul-bosa at the lower end, which generally uses white and black threads.

- Riha (Risa)

Riha refers to the chest wrapper worn by Chutia women. (Risa in Dimasa and Tripuri) The Riha is a narrow cloth as indicated by its name. It can be divided into two types. One worn by girls and the other by married women. Unmarried girls wear the Riha from the chest to the waist, while married women wear it by wrapping around the shoulder similar to the Chador. But, among married women, it is still being although in a different fashion (like a Chador). The style of wearing a Riha beneath the Chador among married women indicates that the Riha is much older. The Muga Riha/Risa forms a part of the symbolic attire of the Chutia people. Muga silk is an ancient heritage of the Chutia people. As per the Naoboicha Phukan Buranji, Muga was adopted in the Ahom courts at a later period by employing a thousand Muga producers and weavers from the Chutia community. It consists of patterns known as Kesh-bosa in both the ends.

- Gathigi

Gathigi is the headgear of Chutia women which consists of a Gamusa tied around the hair. The word Gathigi is derived from Gathi which means "knot" in Assamese language. It is mostly worn to protect the hair from dirt and also acts as a hair-covering while cooking. It is mostly worn to protect the hair from dirt and also acts as a hair-covering while cooking. The Bihu songs well establish the historical link between the traditional red-white Gamusa with Sadiya.

- Dukothia, Chador and Kokalmora

The Chutia Dukothia is a cloth of 2 kathi or 6 feet in length and wrapped around the head and the upper body, while the Chador is about 8–9 feet in length and wrapped from the waist to the upper body and head. Wearing the Dukothia or Chador is compulsory for married women in front of elders or on religious occasions. These are mostly made of cotton or endi silk. The Kokal-mara, on the other hand, is a waist wrapper cloth.

- Hasoti and Dabua Katari

The Hasoti and Dabua Katari are both age-old heritage of the Chutia tribe and form an important component of the Chutia female attire. Hasoti is a small red handkerchief which is tied to the Mekhela. On the other end of the Hasoti, a pocket clasp knife called Dabua Katari is tied. It is used by Chutia women to do daily chores like cutting areca nuts or betel nut leaves. The Dab/Dabua Katari is also found among Boros and Dimasas which they call as Daba knife.

- Harudai Jaapi

The Jaapi has been an integral part of Chutia heritage. The Chutia brides wore a Sorudoi Jaapi during marriage ceremonies which were continued up until recently. As per historical text, the last Chutia king Nitipal had given two gold and silver embroidered Japis to the Ahom king as gifts in his attempts for a treaty. Besides this, after annexing Sadiya, the Ahom king received much treasure and bounty among which included Jaapis. During the Ahom rule, Jaapi-hajiya Khel (guild for making Jaapis) was monopolised by Chutias, which indicate that they were experts in weaving Japis.

== Culture ==
=== Housing ===
The Chutia people reside mostly in the interior places on the banks of the rivers. A Chutia village usually consists from at least 60 to about 140 families. Earlier each family housed about 100 individuals in joint families,

=== Rituals ===
The rituals of the Chutia community have a tribal-tantric folk religion base with an influence of Hinduism and Vaishnavism which have brought some reforms among a section of Chutias who are now known as Kesa-ponthi. They are named as such because they have been imposed certain restrictions like use of animal meat and alcohol in their rites. Others who have retained the age-old customs in its original form are termed as Poka-ponthis. Some of the rituals include Sabahs like Holita loguwa, Aai, Panitula Borsabah, Dangoria, Borsarakia, Khuti, Jal Devota, Jal kuwari, Apeswari, Kalika; Hewa/Pujas like Deo-kuber, Suvasani, Moh jokh Raati Hewa, Haun puja, and other rituals like Bhekulir Biya, Na-khuwa, Nangol dhua, Bhoral pitha dia, Nangol pitha dia. A few of the rituals are discussed below.

==== Deo-kuber ====
The Deo-kuber ritual is a tribal-tantrik form of ancestral worship. It is also known as Deo-kuber Holita loguwa hokam as earthen lamps are lighted in the name of the god of wealth Kuber as well as Kundi. The other Bodo origin tribes like Boros, Koch and Rabhas also celebrate a similar festival which they call as Kuber Brai. During the rule of the Chutia kings, this ritual was often organised for the welfare of the state. In this ceremony, the religious symbols of Kuber god. During this ceremony, rice beer (Chuje), Handoh guri (ground rice), puffed rice (Akhoi), areca nut, betel leaves, several kinds of Pitha (Khula dia, Tel Diya, etc.), duck meat and posola (a dish made of banana stem) are prepared. A pair of a male and female duck is sacrificed in the name of Gira-Girasi (ancestral deities) and smoked meat is offered along with two servings of Chuje to the deities. After the Deori completes his prayers and rituals, the duck is prepared into a dish and distributed among the people as offerings from God.

==== Dangoria Sabah ====
The Dangoria is considered to be a village deity among the Chutias. The ritual is generally organised near the tree where the spirit is believed to reside. In modern times, many people organise it in their homes. The Poka-panthi sect offers rice wine (Chuje) along with meat while the Kesa-panthi sect offers rice-powder (pitha-guri), milk-pudding (payakh) and bananas. The Poka-panthis have three types of Dangoria rituals (Kala Sorai, Ronga sorai and Tinitia Sorai) according to the type of bird being sacrificed. In this ritual, first earthen lamps are lit under the tree. Then, an offering of chuje or payakh is made along with four pairs of betel leaf and areca nuts, Banana Khar and vegetable curry. The Poka-panthis also sacrifice the birds and cook the meat along with Korai guri. Later, the priests pray to the spirit of the Dangoria deity and bless the household. The ritual is known as "Rangason" in Deori language.

==== Apeswari Sabah ====
The Apeshwari Sabha is organised to worship Apeshwari Ai (a form of Kechai-khati goddess).In this ritual, the house is first clean thoroughly and all the used clothes are washed. Then, some girls, as well as old women from the village, are called to the household. They are named as Gopinis and are made to sit in a circle in the courtyard. After that, the family brings in the offerings which include rice-powder (pitha-guri), unpasteurised milk (ewa gakhir) and bananas. Then, at the front of the women, a sieve (Saloni/Dala) is placed on top of which the offerings are arranged on a banana leaf (agoli kolpat) and a white cloth. Next, earthen lamps (saki) are lit and the area is decorated with flowers and betel nuts. The Gopinis then recite prayers (Apeshwari naam) to the goddess so as to bless the household especially the child. The family is asked to come and pray to the goddess and the Gopinis bless the child/infant. After this is over, a set of offering is separated for the goddess and offered to her at the backyard of the house or in an open field. The rest is given to the Gopinis as offerings for their service. This ritual is also found among the Deoris and call the deity as Apeswari or Yoi Midi.

==== Suvasani ====
The Suvasani ritual is mostly carried out at night in the months of April/May for the well-being of family/village members. Suvasani Aai is a household deity (a form of the goddess Kechai-khati). In the ritual, first, the priest prays to the goddess Suvasani for the welfare of the family/village and then distributes prasad along with holy water to the people for purifying their souls. Then, ducks are sacrificed by the priest with the help of other people. After the sacrifice is over, the male members of the family/village get together and organise a feast. This ritual is also found among the Tengaponia clan of the Deoris and call the deity as Suvasani or Yanyo Midi. Due to the influence of Neo-Vaishnava faith, a large number of Chutias have either left performing the ritual or have replaced the duck with an ash gourd.

== Bibliography ==
- Baruah, S L (1986), A Comprehensive History of Assam, Munshiram Manoharlal
- Baruah, Swarnalata (2007). Chutia Jatir Buranji.
- Bhattacharjee, J. B. (1992), "The Kachari (Dimasa) state formation", in Barpujari, H. K. (ed.), The Comprehensive History of Assam, vol. 2, Guwahati: Assam Publication Board, pp. 391–397
- Buragohain, Romesh (1988). Ahom State Formation in Assam: An Inquiry into the Factors of Polity Formation in Medieval North East India (PhD). North-Eastern Hill University. hdl:10603/61119.
- Acharyya, Prarthana; Mahanta, Sakuntala (2019). "Language vitality assessment of Deori: An endangered language". Language Documentation & Conservation. 13: 514–544. hdl:10125/24853.
- Gogoi, Jahnavi (2002). Agrarian System of Medieval Assam. New Delhi: Concept Publishing Company.
- Guha, Amalendu (December 1983), "The Ahom Political System: An Enquiry into the State Formation Process in Medieval Assam (1228-1714)", Social Scientist, 11 (12): 3–34, doi:10.2307/3516963, JSTOR 3516963, archived from the original on 6 July 2023
- Jacquesson, François (2008). "Discovering Boro-Garo" (PDF). History of an Analytical and Descriptive Linguistic Category. Archived from the original (PDF) on 3 August 2019.
- Jacquesson, François; van Breugel, Seino (3 November 2017). "The linguistic reconstruction of the past: The case of the Boro-Garo languages". Linguistics of the Tibeto-Burman Area. 40 (1): 90–122. doi:10.1075/ltba.40.1.04van.
- Kumar, Vikrant; Basu, Debashis; Reddy, B Mohan (2004). "Genetic Heterogeneity in Northeastern India: Reflection of Tribe–Caste Continuum in the Genetic Structure". American Journal of Human Biology. 16 (3): 334–345. doi:10.1002/ajhb.20027. PMID 15101058. S2CID 22571529.
- Pathak, Guptajit (2008), Assam's history and its graphics, Mittal Publications
- Shin, Jae-Eun (2020). "Descending from demons, ascending to kshatriyas: Genealogical claims and political process in pre-modern Northeast India, The Chutiyas and the Dimasas". The Indian Economic and Social History Review. 57 (1): 49–75. doi:10.1177/0019464619894134. S2CID 213213265.
- Dutta, Sristidhar (1985), The Mataks and their Kingdom, Allahabad: Chugh Publications
- Nath, D (2013), "State Formation in the Peripheral Areas: A Study of the Chutiya Kingdom in the Brahmaputra Valley", in Bhattarcharjee, J B; Syiemlieh, David R (eds.), Early States in North East India, Delhi: Regency Publications, pp. 24–49, ISBN 978-81-89233-86-0
- Sarma, Benudhar (1993), Maniram Dewan, Guwahati: Manuh Prakashan
- Hamilton, Francis (1940), Bhuyan, Surya Kumar (ed.), An Account of Assam, The Government Of Assam
