= Matak people =

18th-century native of Assam, India

The Moamoria (also known as Mataks) were the adherents of the Mayamara Satra, an egalitarian and proselytizing Neo-Vaishnavite sect of 18th-century Assam, who initiated the Moamoria rebellion against the Ahom kingdom in the 18th century. The rebellion weakened the Ahom kingdom to such an extent that the kingdom became vulnerable to repeated Burmese invasions of Assam and the subsequent colonization by the British. The Moamorias were also called Mataks. Over time, the main groups that had supported the Ahom kingdom came to owe allegiance to the Moamara satra: Morans (the mainstay of the Ahom militia), Chutias (expert archers and matchlockmen), the Sonowal Kacharis (gold-washers), professional castes such as Hiras (potters), Tantis (weavers), Kaibartas, and Ahom nobles and officers. The largest group among the Mataks were the Morans, followed by the Chutias.

The Matak identity solidified during the rebellion, and the Moamorias referred to themselves as Mataks over their original ethnic identities. In a treaty with the Ahom kingdom in 1805, the Moamorias were able to set up an autonomous region, the Matak Rajya, under the office of Borsenapati, with his seat at Bengmara (modern-day Tinsukia). The Matak community continued to hold strong till the beginning of the 20th century, and the Matak-Moran Sanmilan was formed in 1937; but the Morans formed their own organization, the Moran Sabha, in 1965 with the hope that the Moran people might benefit from the 5th Schedule of the Indian Constitution.

== Moamara Sattra ==
=== Beginning ===
The sattra was established by Aniruddhadev, whose mother was a cousin to Sankardev, sometime after 1601. Aniruddhadev was the disciple of Gopaldev (Gopal Ata of Bhawanipur) who had initiated the Kala sanghati sect of the Ekasarana dharma. He established the sattra near the Moamari lake in Majuli. He quickly gathered a large following, and the followers developed such rigid principles that they would not bow to anyone or anything except their guru, the sattradhikar (abbot) of the sattra (monastery). Aniruddhadev was followed by his son, Krishnanandadev, as the abbot during whose time the Ahom king Prataap Singha subjugated the Baro-Bhuyans in the north bank of Brahmaputra and moved them to the south bank. Krishnanandadev, being a Bhuyan, too moved and established his seat at Khutiapota, near present-day Jorhat. Here he was able to convert even more, including many Ahom nobles.

=== Matak ===
The Moamoarias were also called mataks. One theory suggests that this name was given by the Ahom king, Prataap Singha, on account of their strict adherence to the monotheism of Ekasarana dharma (in Assamese: mat: opinion, ek: single). In an incident narrated in some Buranjis, Prataap Singha tested the fanaticism of his own high nobles and officers, who were disciples of the Moamara Sattra, by making them ride their horses against naked swords held at the level of their necks. A noble, the Guimela Sola Borgohain and an officer, the Neog-Phukan, lost their lives since they refused to bow down and ride under the sword, at which point the test was stopped. Another possible explanation is that the Maran people acquired that name because of their valour (in Ahom language: ma: courage, tak tested) which then transferred to the Moamorias in general; the cognate Tai-language speaking Singpho and Khamti people described the people of the Barsenapati too as matak (strong) against the weaker mulungs (the weak royalists).

== Notable people ==
- Paresh Baruah
