= Barpeta Satra =

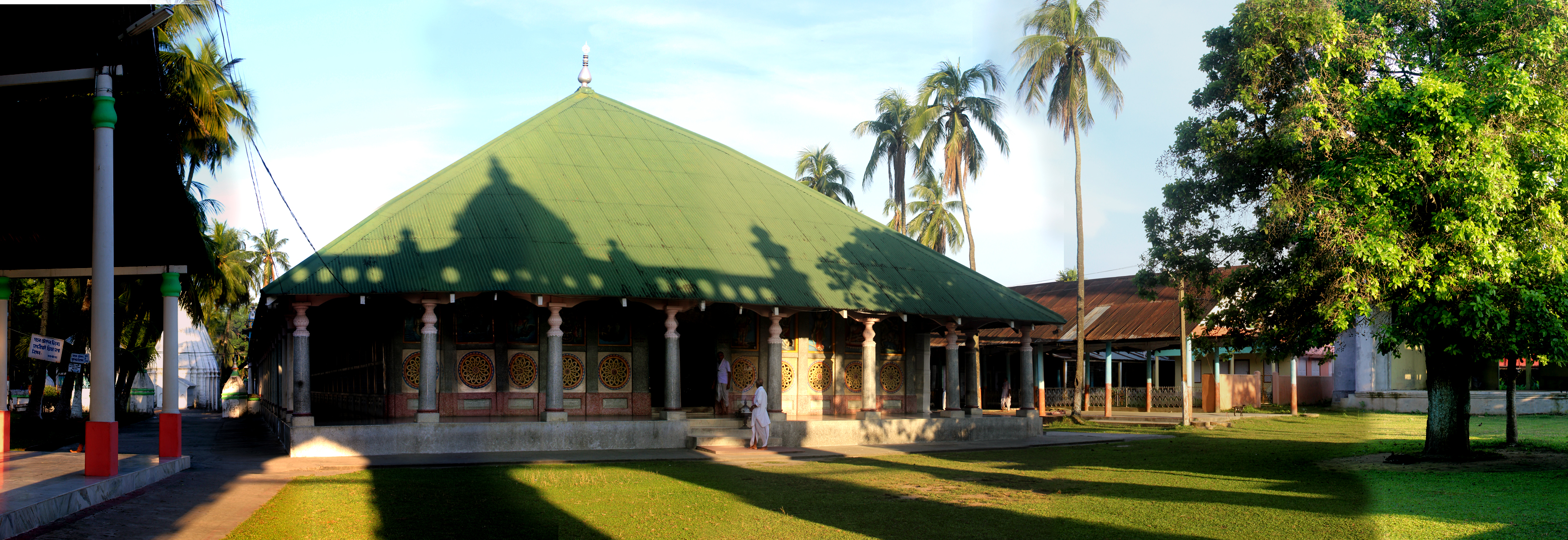
- Barpeta kirtan ghar

Religion
- Affiliation: Hinduism
- District: Barpeta
- Festivals: Raasleela, Doul Utsav

Location
- State: Assam
- Country: India
- Interactive map of Barpeta Satra

Architecture
- Type: Assamese
- Creator: Madhabdev
- Completed: 1583 A.D.
- Inscriptions: Assamese, Brajabhali

Barpeta Satra is a well-known sattra situated at Barpeta in the Indian state of Assam. It was established by vaishnavite saint Madhabdev in 1505 shakabda (1583 AD). The earlier name of the satra was Barpeta Than.

When Madhabdeva left the Satra, he gave the responsibility to his disciple Sri Mathuradasa Ata (1490-1596 AD), a Chandala by origin to take care of the Satra and he became the first Satradhikar of Barpeta Satra. It was Burha Ata who systematized the administration of the Satra leading to development of the institution and the region of Barpeta. He introduced a democratic system which is effective till today.

Originally built as a Kutcha house, it was concreted with big-pillars and decorative wall paintings in 1878.

== Main premises ==
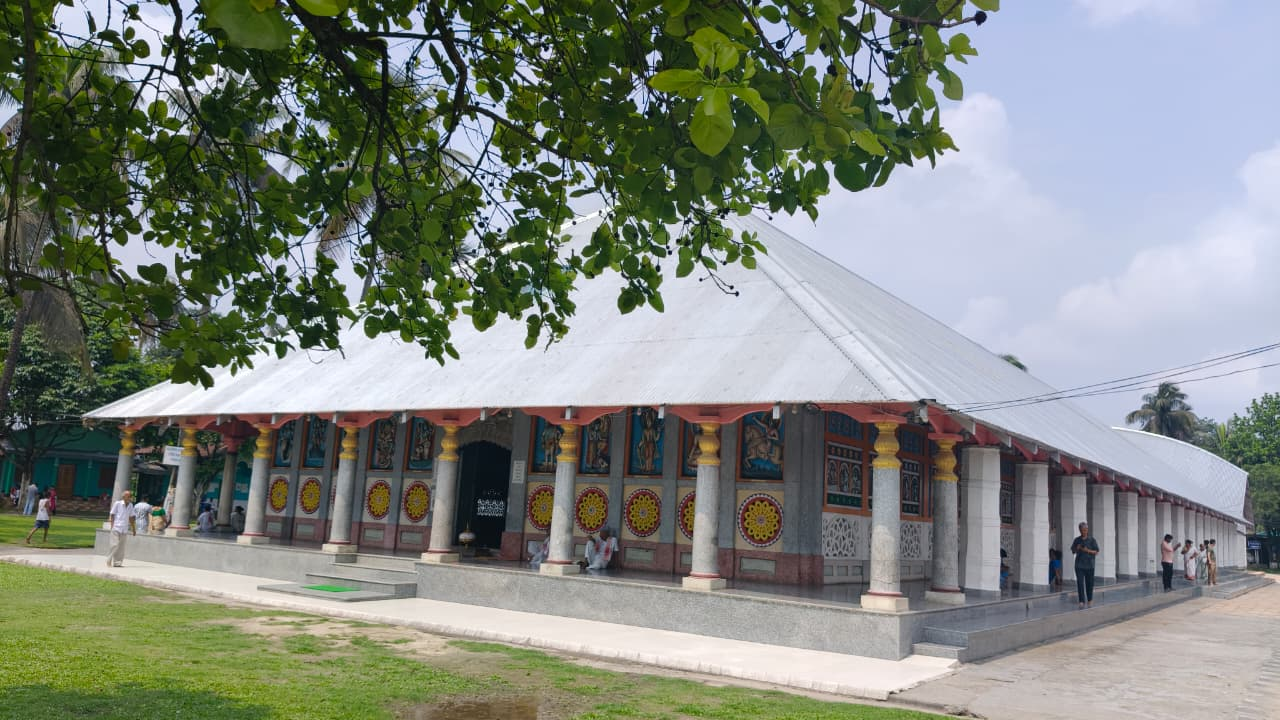
Barpeta Satra side view

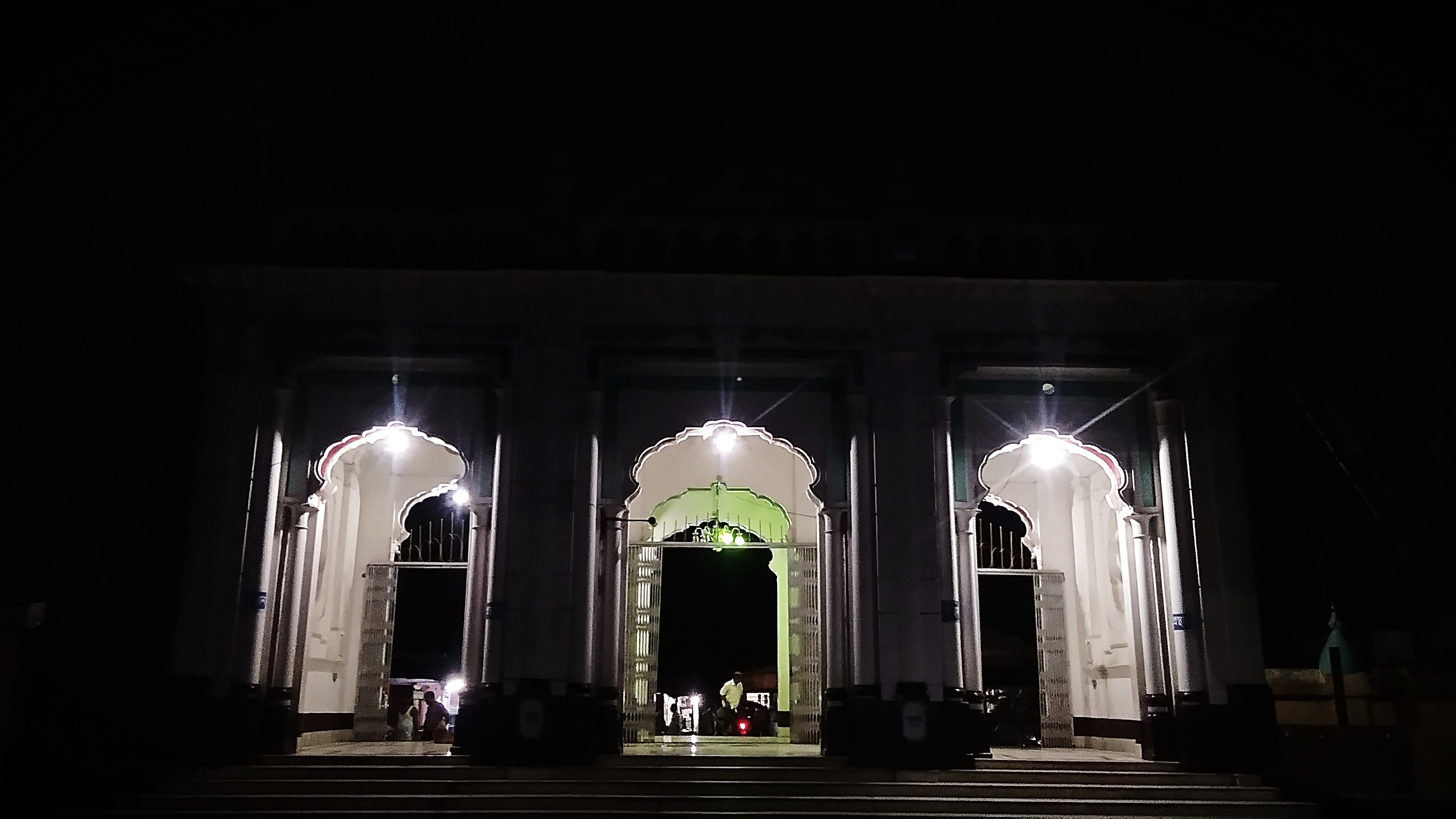
Main Entrance of the Kirtanghar

Below are some buildings inside Satra Premises.

Satra Premises: Satra premises start with three Batchara (Entry Gate of Areas), whereas Main complex is surrounded by Wall, they are (i) Nahati Batchara (westside entry) (ii) Uttar Hati Batchara (North Entry) and (iii) Dakshinhati Batchara (Entry from South), there is no entry from East side because a canal (Hari Jaan) flows along the east side.

Entry Gate: As like Batchara, there are three entry gate to enter main complex, i.e. Uttar Dwaar (north gate), Dakshin Dwaar (south gate) and Dalan (on west side). Dalan is considered the main entry.

Kirtan Ghar (main prayer hall): Kirtan ghar is situated in the almost center of the Sarta complex. Main entrance in the west, Bhaj ghar is in east. Near to main west gate, there are two wooden pillar (traditionally known as Tulashi Kuta) making the support to main building. There are Guru Ashans, which are followed by two big Ghacha (stand) are kept Akhay Banti (lamp). There are two Chairs behind the Guru Ashana (east corner) namely for Burha Satriya and Deka Satria, where they do their day-to-day activities. There are three Guru Ashans in the Kirtan Ghar, it is believed that these Guru Ashan are associated with the name of Sri Sankar Dev, Madhab Dev and Padma Ata. According to the general faith these three Guru Ashan are dedicated towards lord Krishna in a composite form. There are seven Bar Sarais (great sarais) are kept in a line before the Guru Ashan. One Chaki/Pradip are lightening in front of each Bar Sarai. There is no statue of any God or Goddess inside the Kirtan ghar.

Bhaj Ghar: This is known as Monikut, valuable ornaments of gold and silver are kept in this area. Some representative statues are also kept here. The Bhaj Ghar is established in the east side of Kirtan Gharn in the north-south position. The architectural style of the Bhaj Ghar is unique.

Pat Chang: The pat chang also carries a special architectural style. The pat chang is a made of wood and tin. It is constructed parallel to the Bhaj Ghar. The floor of the pat chang is 5 feet (1.5 m) above from the ground. Some special meetings are held here. Basically religious and administrative issues of satra are discussed here. It is honoured as pure as the pat chang of king Kongsha.

Khatkhati Ghat: There is a canal running to the east side of Satra complex. The bank of the canal which touches the Satra complex in the east is known as Khatkhati (the canal later on block two sides and converted to pool and named as Madhab Sarover, but it now again run as a canal). Shree Madhab Deva, the great disciple of Srimanta Sankar Deva used to bath along with other bhakats in this canal. All the steps (khatkhati) were constructed with stone. There are statues of child Krishna was constructed in between the water of the jaan (canal).

Math: The math available in the Barpeta Satra is similar to the Ahom architectural style. Some precious Sankar–Madhab memorabilia are kept in the math i.e. a piece of stone (used by Sankar and Madhab to wash their feet ), the manuscripts of Sankar Dev's Dasham and Madhab Dev's Namghosha, Bhakti Ratnavali and two "Negeri" currency, which was given to Madhura Das by Madhab Dev as remuneration.

Sri Ram Ata’s Bhiti: The house (Bhiti) of Sri Ram Ata was established opposite to the house of Madhab Dev’s house. Now a day one well is constructed here, the water of this well is assumed as pure and water from this well is used in all the works of the Satra.

Burha Ata’s Bhiti: In the north-east position of the Satra there is a small but beautiful house constructed on the place where the 1st Satria of Barpeta Satra Mathura das Burha Ata lived.

Bhagawat Graiha: It is an open (without wall) L-shaped house, it is used as a prayer house, every day at the morning and evening time people come to listen the Bhagawat. In the time of Doul or holi the Bhagwat house is used as temporary medical house.

Sabha Ghar: Sabha Ghar is also an open house in the north-west position of the Kirtan Ghar. General meeting of Community are held here. There is a small house in the north side of the Sabha ghar it is known as Jagamohan Ghriha.

Doul: There is a unique design 7th stairs building in North-West corner (near to North entry gate), which is mainly for keeping the Kalia Thakur on the time of Doul (Holi Festival) .

Ranga Mancha: Previously people may perform art in openly, but later on it is cover-up with boundary and performing on the stage. Ranga mancha is a modern stage for performing Arts and cultural activity in time by time.

== Transportation ==
To reach Barpeta, the rail route, via Katihar and Siliguri, is convenient. The nearest railway station is Barpeta Road. Nearest airport is at Guwahati. Barpeta is well connected by road transport from Guwahati (distance is 95 km).

== Bibliography ==
- Sharma, Chandan Kumar (2009). "Tribe Caste Continuum and the Formation of Assamese Identity". In Medhi, B.K (ed.). Tribes of North-East India: Issues and Challenges. Delhi: Omsons Publications. pp. 354–366.
