= Chaklong =

Wedding rituals of Ahom people

Chaklong wedding, also known as Saklong wedding, is a traditional Ahom marriage system. It is still practiced by many Ahom people today.

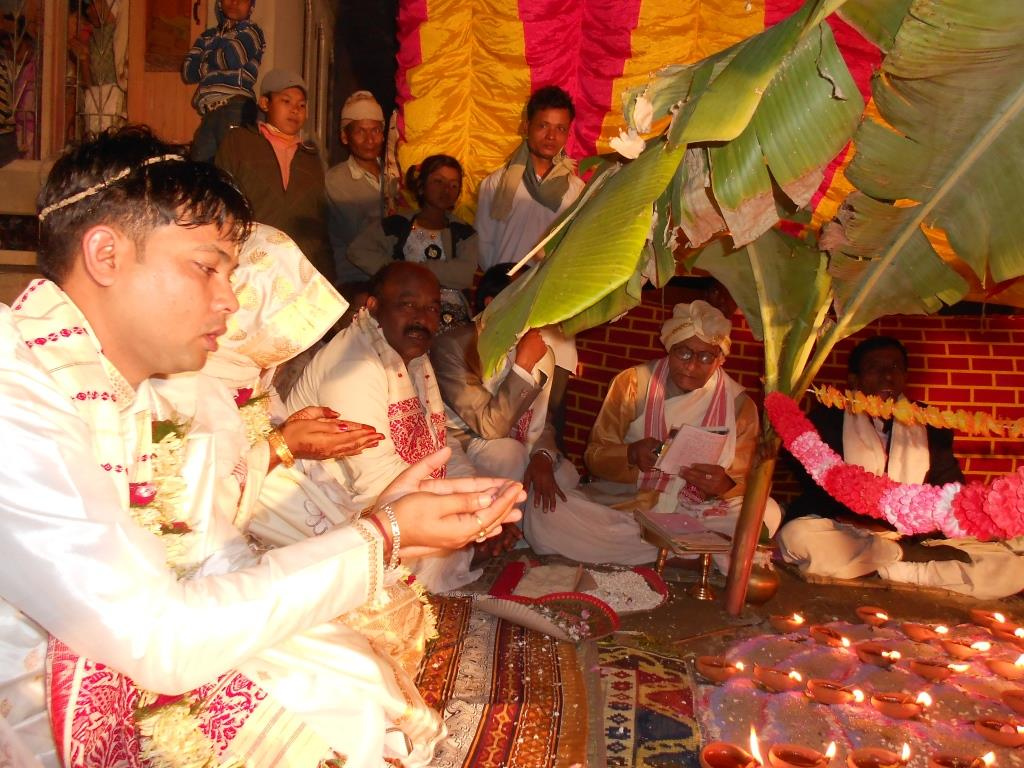
Chaklong

== History ==
The Choklong wedding system is thought to have originated in the 13th century, when the Ahom people migrated to Assam from Dehong, Yunnan, China. This tradition has persisted from the time of Nang-hun-pha (the first Ahom-Chak-long marriage) to the present day, with an unbroken display of grandeur and splendor.

The Chaklang custom, considered a social tradition among the Ahoms, has been practiced since the era of the Ahom kings. An illustrative example is the marriage of Swargadev Rajeswar Singha to Princess Kuranganayani of Manipur. To trace the origin of this custom, it dates back to when Lengdon married the eldest daughter of Ak-Kai-Mo-Hung, Nang-Hun-Pha. The matrimonial process commenced with Lengdon sending a ceremonial gift of betel leaves and Areca nuts, adorned at both ends and presented on Sarai platters with stands, all enveloped in hand-made red towels. This marked the inception of the Chaklang tradition.

== Rituals ==
Among the Ahoms, intermarriage within the same clan is prohibited. Numerous traditions observed during Ahom weddings are shared with other Assamese communities, including the joron ceremony, daiyan, and gathiyan.

A suitable girl is identified, and the boy's family approaches her family with a 'Sodhanibhar,' which includes betel nuts and leaves, rice, ducks, and more. If there are no concerns with the boy's family, a date is set for the girl's family to visit and observe the boy's family's lifestyle. Subsequently, a wedding date is agreed upon.

== Wedding ceremony ==
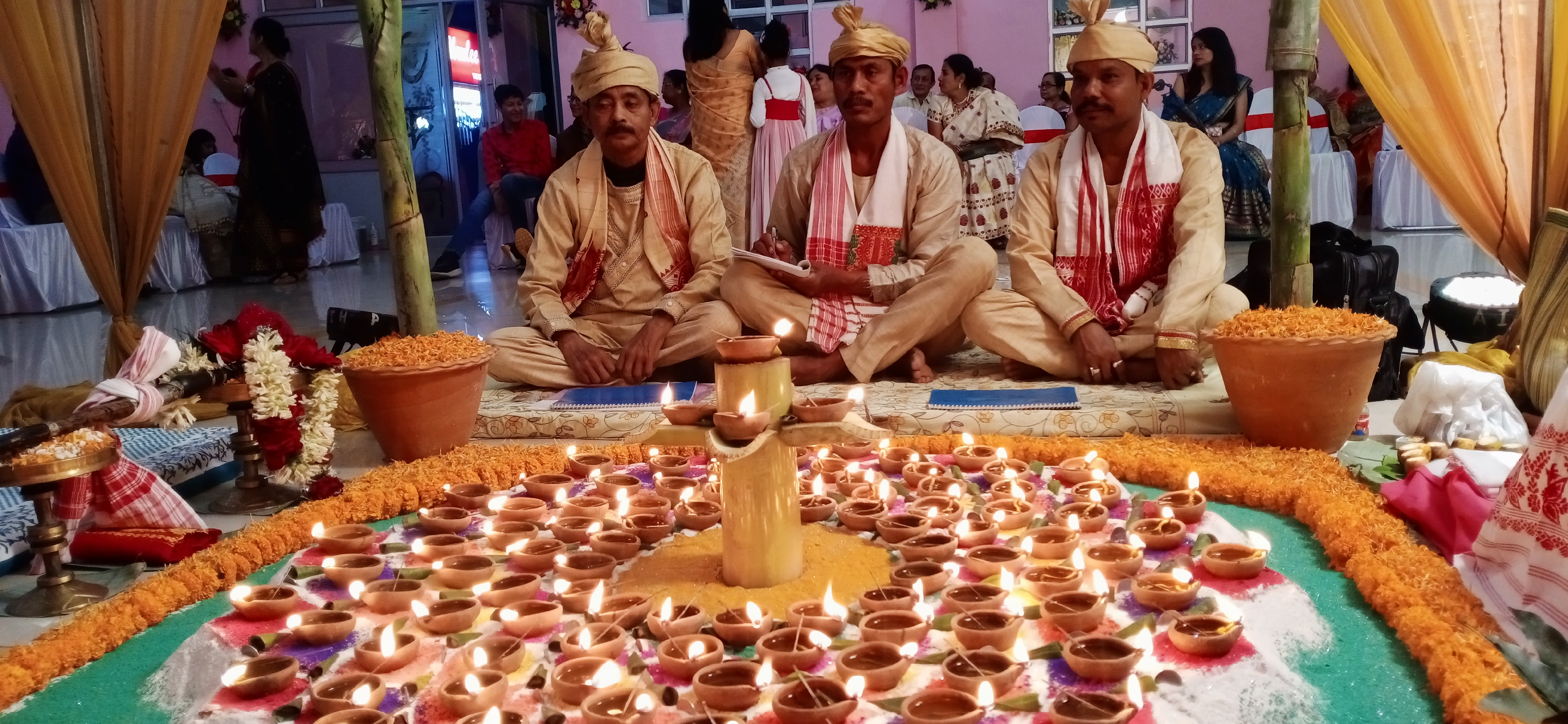
Three Ahom priests (Molung) during Chaklang

During the ceremony, the bridegroom is seated in the courtyard, while the bride is brought in to circle him seven times before taking her place beside him. Subsequently, they both rise and move to a private room, shielded from the guests. Here, one end of a cloth is tied around the bride's neck, while the other end is fastened to the bridegroom's waist. They walk together to a corner of the room where nine vessels filled with water are arranged on plantain leaves. The Siring phukam, or master of ceremonies, recites from the 'Choklong puthi,' and three cups containing milk, honey, and rice frumenty are presented for the bride and bridegroom to inhale.

Following this, the bride and bridegroom exchange knives, and uncooked rice in a basket is brought forth. Each of them secretly places a ring into the basket, intending for the other to discover it and wear it on their finger. This exchange of knives and rings is the pivotal part of the ceremony. Afterward, the bride and bridegroom are escorted outside to pay their respects to the bride's parents and the assembled guests, thus completing the marriage.

Two days before the wedding, the priest undertakes a pilgrimage to a river or tank to conduct pujas in honor of God Khoakham. Offerings of rice, eggs, betel nuts, and betel leaves are presented. Using a jokai, a bamboo fishing implement, the priest "fishes" in the water three times. If a fish is caught, it is prepared and served to the soon-to-be-married couple as a protective measure against any unfortunate events.

On the day preceding the wedding, the deoban ceremony takes place to venerate various Ahom deities. The priest imparts wisdom from the Ahom sacred texts regarding the rights and responsibilities of married life. The ancestral history of both families, spanning seven generations, is recounted to the couple. Subsequently, the couple is ushered into the bride's residence, where they partake in customs such as the exchange of rings, consumption of panchamrita, and engaging in dice or cowrie games.
