= Badala Padma Ata =

Vaishnavite preacher (1546–1678)

Padma Ata
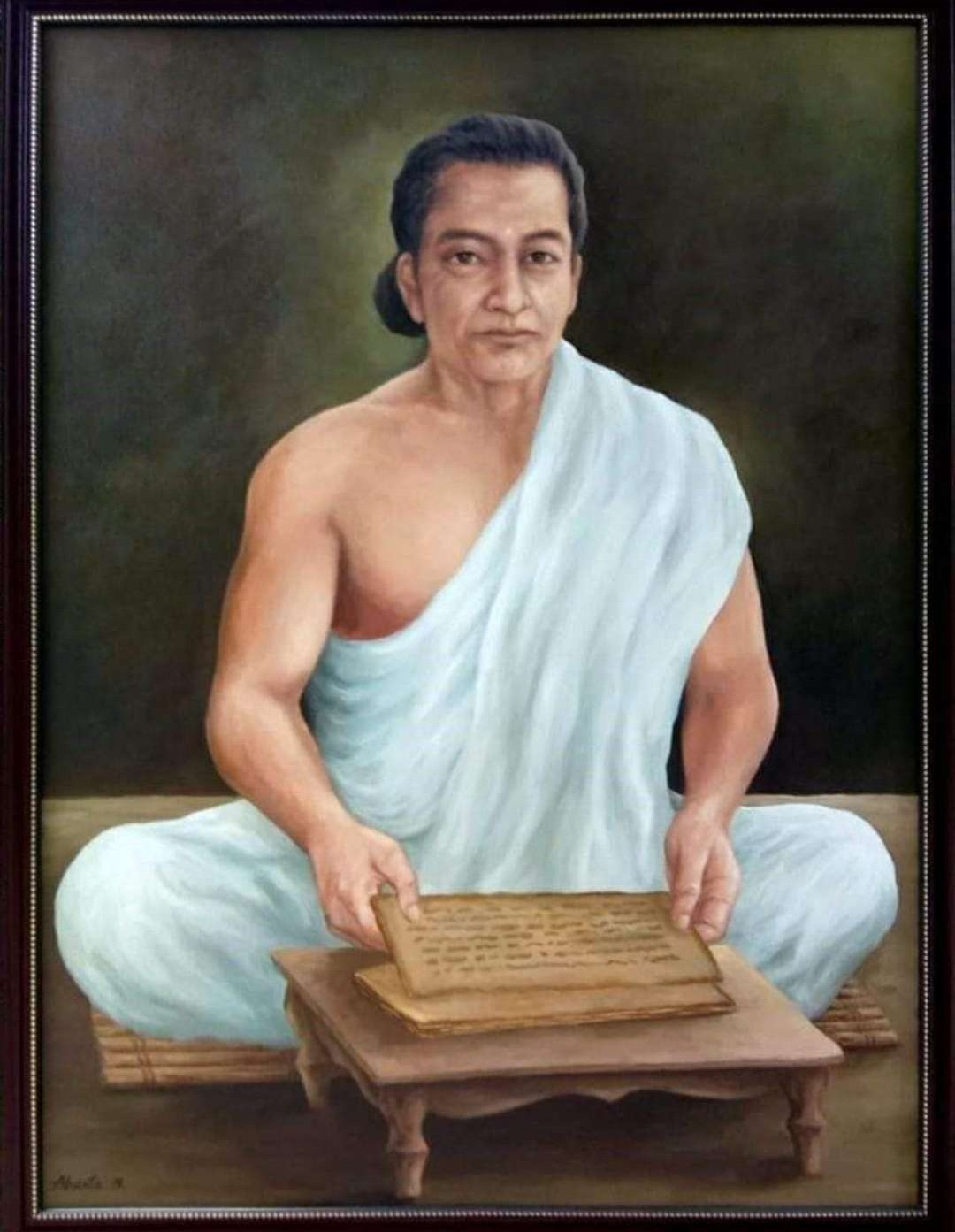

Personal life
- Born: 1546 Sokrahi, Narayanpur, Assam
- Died: 1678 (aged 132 years) Kamalabari, Majuli
- Parents: Titachomdar (father); Satya (mother)
- Other name: Badala
- Occupation: Ekasarana Preceptor

Religious life
- Religion: Ekasarana Dharma

Senior posting
- Disciple of: Madhavdev
- Disciples: Sri Rama

Badala Padma Ata (1546-1678) was a Vaisnavite Preacher and a saint who propagated his teaching during 16th and 17th centuries. He was one of the principle founder of Nika Samathi along with Mathuradasa Ata and Keshav Ata, and established 24 Satras in Upper Assam including the famous Kamalabari Satra. He first met Madhavdev at Bhela Satra and became a very devout disciple of him.

== Biography ==
Earlier in his life, Padma Ata joined the Ahom Army as a shields man (baruwati). After he saw the sorrow and plight of the people after war, he was so deeply affected by this that he abandoned all worldly attachments. He became a devout disciple of Madhavdev, he was also one of his youngest chief disciples, after receiving directions from his Guru he moved to Eastern Assam erstwhile Ahom kingdom and began propagating his teachings and to cover the people of the area as it was not been covered by the Sankardev. Badala passed through different places, far distances and preached among the people at various stopovers of his journey. Ultimately he settled at Majuli and established the Kamalabari Satra, a Satra still known and famous for its display of art and culture. Just before he died he appointed one of his disciples Sri Rama as his successor in the Satra as the head. His Satra was established in an orange garden (Komola Ban) of Purusuttom Barua, an Ahom officer. Thus it got its name.

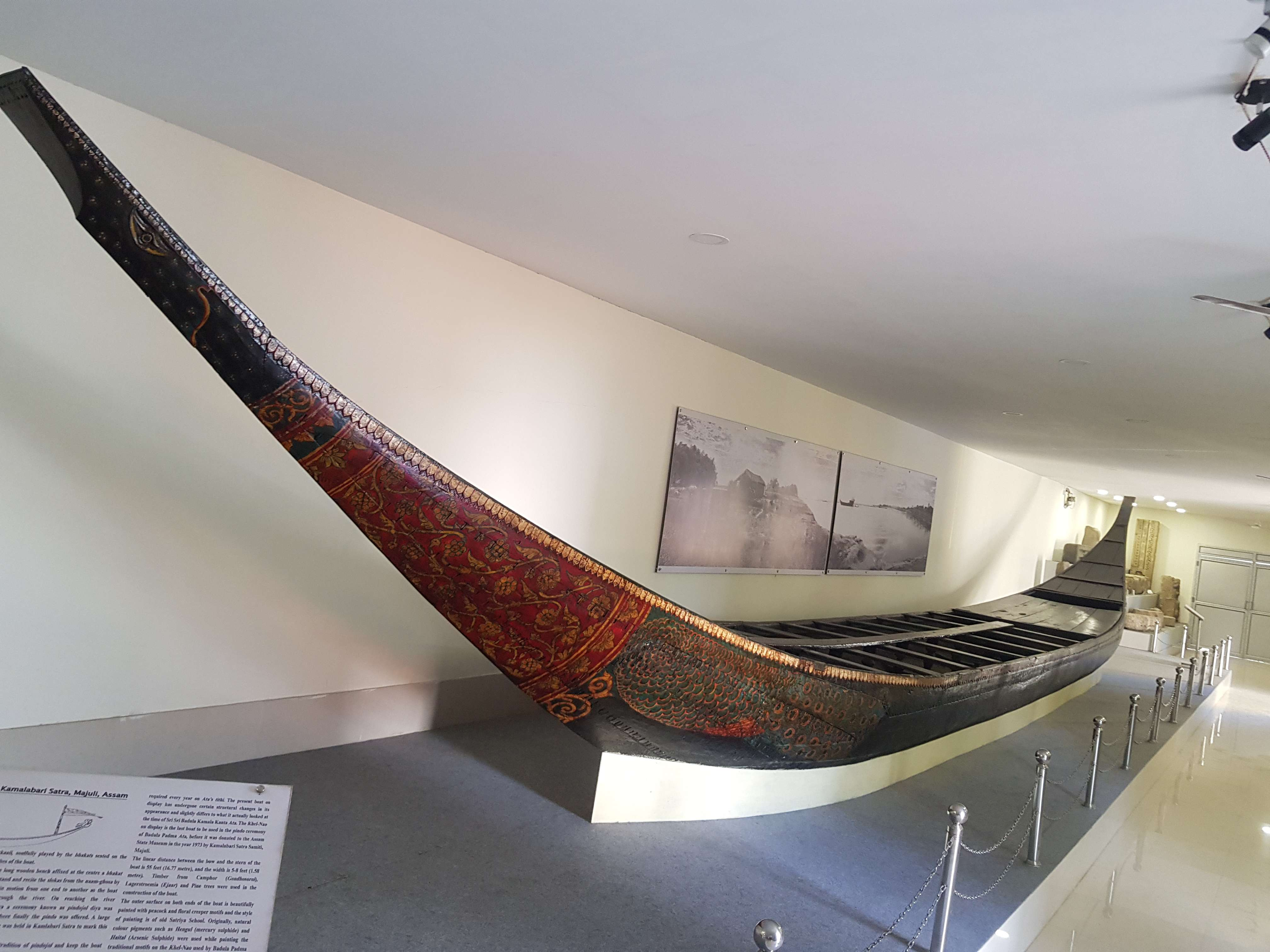
Khel-Nao boat of Badala Ata

His founded the Nika Samathi sect, Nika means means pure and virtuous this samthi probably formed properly after the other ones as the situation of declination and mayhem might be observed by the disciples in above three samhatis therefore the name Nika was given to this samhati which shows the pure and absolute form of the Madhavdev sect. It is also known as Nitya Samathi. This sect came to existence much later than the other three sects.

He died in 1678, aged 132.

== Names ==
Padma (as he was beautiful like a rose), Govinda (as per horoscope), Rupdhar (name given by mother), Laba-r- nati (meaning Laba’s grandson), Gosain (name given by Ahom King), Hari-r -pu (name given by Kesava Ata), Kamalakanta (another name given by mother), Amukai (addressed so by Saint Madhavadeva), Ujaniya Bapughar (name given by Mathuradasa Ata), Badula Ata (meaning, on behalf of Saint Madhavadeva)

== See also ==
- Sattra
- Borgeet
- Madhavdev
- Dihanaam
- Ankia Naat
- Sankardev
