= Gopaldev =

Gopal Dev
- Born: 1540; Nazira, Sivasagar district, Assam
- Died: 1611 (aged 70–71)
- Occupation: Vaishnavite Preacher
- Writing career
- Pen name: Bhabanipuria Gopal Ata
- Language: Assamese
- Movement: Kala Samhati

Gopal Ata (1540–1611) was an Indian poet, dramatist and chief preacher of the Vaishnava sect in eastern Assam. He was famous for founding the Kala Samhati sect of Ekasarana Dharma. He founded Satra in Bhavanipur and is therefore popularly known as Bhavanipuria Gopal Ata.

== Ancestry ==
Gopal Ata was born in a humble Kalita (caste) family. Katha Guru Charita describes that his family migrated from Kalita Country. His ancestor's name was Kola Kalita. His later lineage is recorded as Vasudev, Harideva, Sankaradas, Chatan Giri, Sankarshan, and his father, Naradeva. His father, Naradeva, married Atya (the daughter of Hari Borkalita) as his second wife. Naradeva passed away while Satya was pregnant. Following his death, a local king's son claimed a heavy debt of 400. Satya fled through the wilderness and hills of Miri country into the Ahom kingdom.

== Brief life ==
Gopal Ata was born in the Ahom kingdom on a Wednesday in the month of Vaisakha (on Shukla Saptami under the constellation of Pusya). According to local legend, auspicious supernatural sounds echoed at his birth. Fearing these signs, the Ahom king Swarganarayan ordered the execution of all newborn boys in the area; however, Gopal's mother hid him under layers of clothes to save his life.

During his childhood in the Ahom Kingdom, Gopal played with the Ahom prince, Kowar Jaysingh. During a play dispute, the prince tried to attack Gopal with a royal elephant. Gopal defended himself by grasping the elephant's tusk and throwing both the prince and the elephant into a ditch. To escape royal anger after the incident, Gopal and his mother fled the Ahom territory. They spent years wandering and seeking refuge in various regions. Eventually, they settled in the potter caste ( hira ) village of Sundari.

While living in Sundari, Gopal met Sri Ram Ata. Upon learning that Sankardeva's wife struggled to bathe in muddy waters, Gopal immediately arranged for Hira people ( potters ) to make and install clay well rings ( patuka ) to build a clean well for her. Following this, Gopal met Sankardeva, who initiated him into the Ekasarana Dharma faith and recognised his spiritual name as Vishnu. Gopal embraced a highly renounced life, staying within Sankardeva's compound and eating only rice with salt and chilli. Sankardeva recognised his spiritual capacity and presented him with a cloth containing Achu patterns, predicting that Gopal would successfully propagate the bhagavati dharma across the region.

== Works ==
As a Vaishnavite guru of Ekasarana Dharma, Gopaldev founded the Kaljhar Satra at Bhavanipur, about 7 km from Pathsala in Bajali district under the guidance of Madhavdeva, earning him the name Bhavanipuria Ata.

== Literary works ==
Gopaldev composed some plays like Janmajatra, Nandutsav and Uddhabjan or Gopi-Uddhab Sambad and Sitar Patal Proves, written in the Assamese Language.

== Tithi ==
The birth anniversary of Gopaldev is celebrated in Namghars and Sattras of Assam as Tithi of Gopaldev. The Government of Assam recognise this day as a holiday every year on this occasion.

== See also ==
- Assamese literature
- List of Assamese writers with their pen names
- List of Assamese-language poets
