= Moran people =

Ethnic group found in the northeast Indian states of Assam and Arunachal Pradesh

Moran
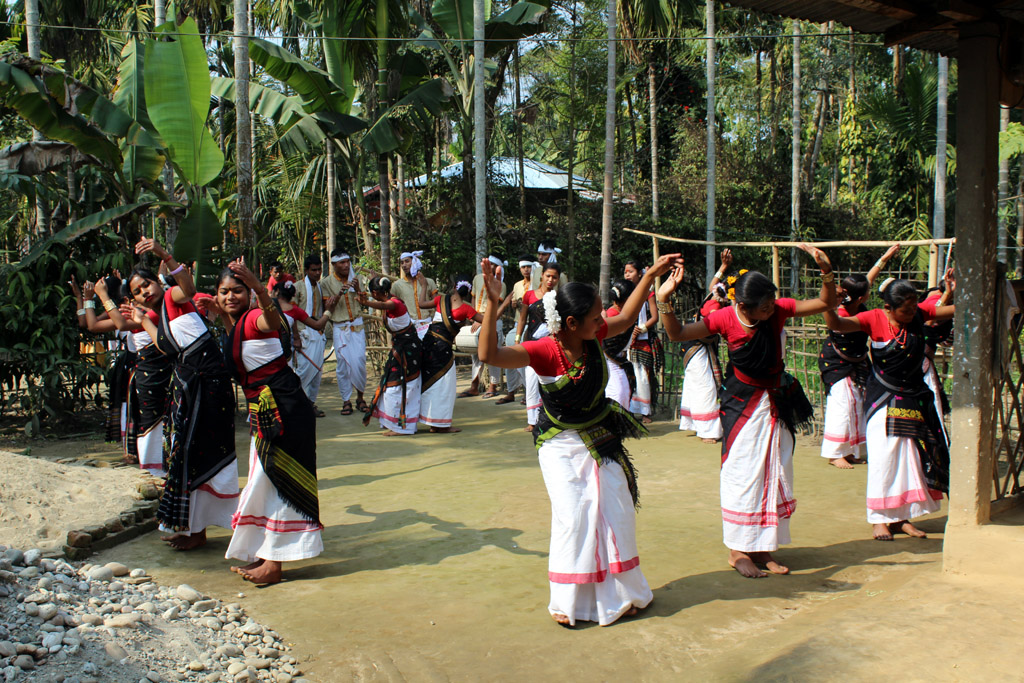
- Moran Bihu Dance

Total population
- Approximately 90,000 in Assam and 50,000 in Arunachal Pradesh

Regions with significant populations
- Predominately in Upper Assam, Arunachal Pradesh

Languages
- Assamese, Moran

Religion
- Tribal animistic religion

Related ethnic groups
- Jingpo people, Dimasas, Sonowal Kacharis

The Moran are an ethnic group found in the northeast Indian states of Assam and Arunachal Pradesh. They are of Tibeto-Burman origin. They speak Assamese language, though they used to speak Moran language which was alive until the early 20th century and was closely related to the Dimasa language. They once shared the same allied customs with other Kachari groups, but after their conversion to Vaishnavism, the customs began to diminish, but still, those customs can be seen intermixed with Vaishnavism.

The Morans were initiated under the fold of Ekasarana Dharma in the tenure of Mayamara abbot Chaturbhujdeva.

== Distribution ==
They are mainly concentrated in the districts of Upper Assam (Tinsukia, Dibrugarh, Jorhat, Sivasagar, Dhemaji and Lakhimpur) and adjoining districts of Arunachal Pradesh (Lohit, Namsai, Changlang district).

== History ==
The Moran community is one of the aboriginal tribes of Assam and Arunachal Pradesh In the 13th century, they lived in the south eastern corner of the Brahmaputra valley and frontier regions of Myanmar occupying territories between the Disang and Dihing rivers. The Morans have a long history in the north–eastern part of India. They had their own independent chiefdom before the advent of the Ahoms. The origin of the word Moran is still remains obscure. According to the British reports the Morans are a distinct tribe inhabiting the jungle, which is, a division of upper Assam.

They had an chiefdom led by chief Bodousa before the advent of the Ahom king Sukaphaa. Having arrived in this affluent kingdom, Sukaphaa proposed to marry princess Gondheswari- the daughter of Moran chief Bodousa. The chief Bodousa accepted his proposal and thus the Moran's became a part of the newly created Ahom polity.

They were also known by the name Habungiya or Hasa where Ha means soil or Earth in Moran language and Sa means son and Habungiya or Hasa means Son of the soil.

== Notable people ==
- Anup Chetia

== See also ==
- Moamoria (Matak)
- Moamoria rebellion
