= Ujoni Majuli =

- Country: India
- State: Assam
- District: Majuli

Languages
  - Official: Assamese
- Time zone: UTC+5:30 (IST)
- ISO 3166 code: IN-AS
- Vehicle registration: AS

Ujoni Majuli is the upper part of Majuli, Assam. It is also called Upper Majuli.

Jorhat, Sibsagar, Mariani, North Lakhimpur are the nearby cities to Ujani Majuli.

Assamese is the local language here.

83.35%, Bharatiya Janata Party, BJP, 46749, INC are the major political parties in this area.

In October 2026, civil works were started under the Assam Integrated River Basin Management Programme.

== See also ==
- Madhya Majuli
- Namoni Majuli
- List of educational institutes in Majuli
