= Mohkhuti =

Mohkhuti may refer to the following places in India:

- Mohkhuti No.1
- Mohkhuti No.2
- Mohkhuti No.3
