= Namoni Majuli =

- City
- Country: India
- State: Assam
- District: Jorhat

Languages
  - Official: Assamese
- Time zone: UTC+5:30 (IST)
- Telephone code: 913775
- ISO 3166 code: IN-AS
- Vehicle registration: AS

Namoni Majuli (also called Lower Majuli) is the lower part of Majuli, Jorhat, Assam. It starts from Kamalabari to lower-most Ahotguri mouza. But years ago this mouza vanished due to severe flood erosion of Brahmaputra River.

== See also ==
- Madhya Majuli
- Ujoni Majuli
- List of educational institutes in Majuli
- List of villages in Majuli
