= Ahotguri mouza =

- Town
- Country: India
- State: Assam
- District: Jorhat

Languages
  - Official: Assamese
- Time zone: UTC+5:30 (IST)
- Telephone code: 913775
- ISO 3166 code: IN-AS
- Vehicle registration: AS

Ahotguri mouza is one of the three mouzas of Majuli, the other two being Salmora and Kamalabari. It is located at the lower most part of Majuli and comprises over 200 villages. But due to severe flood erosion of Brahmaputra River it has been vanished recently, leaving thousands of families homeless.

== See also ==
- Namoni Majuli
- List of villages in Majuli
