= Tuni River =

River in India

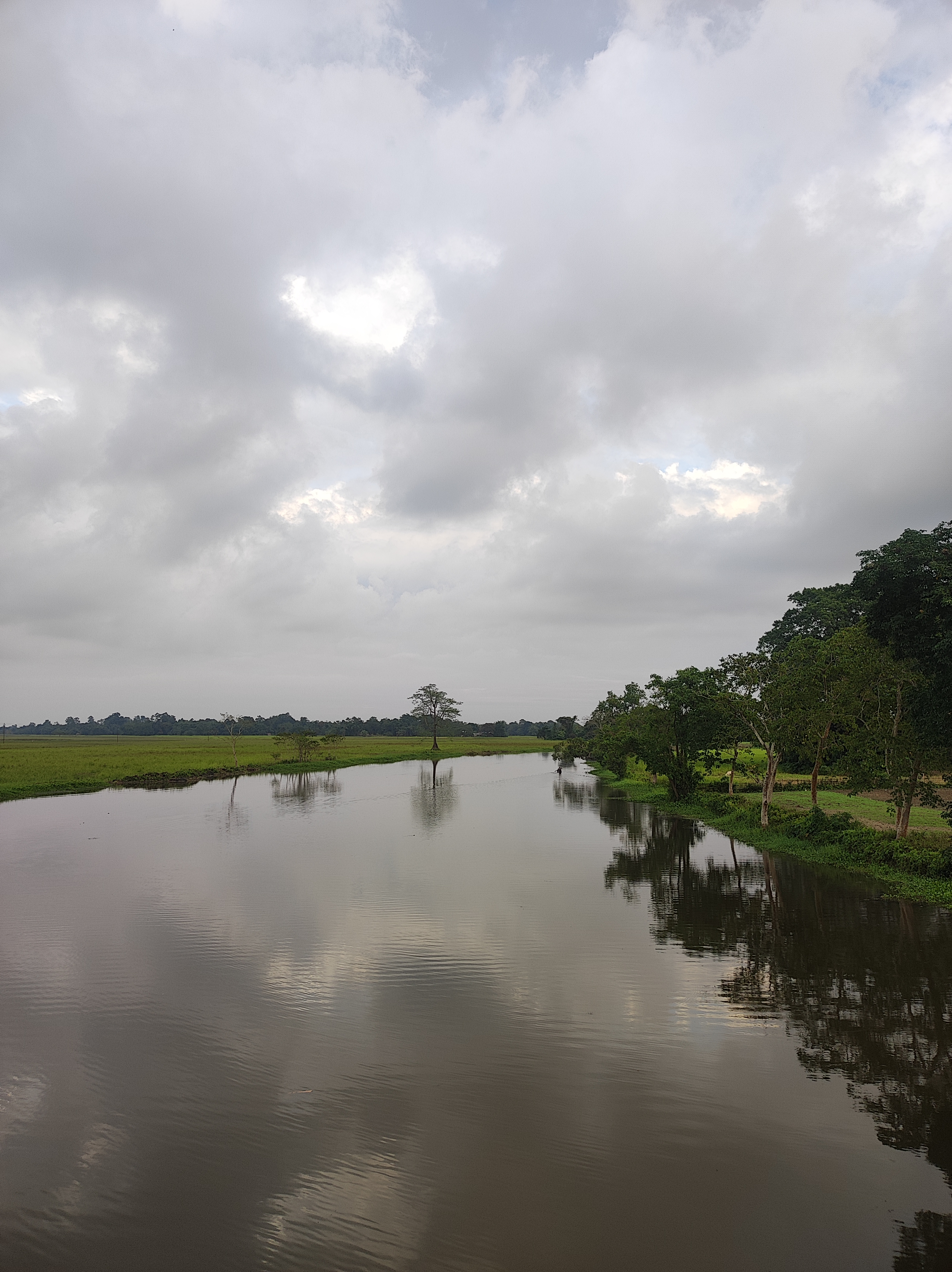

- Location within Assam Location within India

Location
- State: Assam
- District: Majuli district

Physical characteristics
- Source: Mohkhuti No.1
  - location: Majuli district, Assam
  - coordinates: 26°56′19.0″N 94°10′27.4″E
- Mouth: Brahmaputra River
  - location: Bhogpur Satra, Majuli district, Assam
  - coordinates: 26°55′06.4″N 94°09′13.0″E

Basin features
- Progression: Tuni River - Brahmaputra River

The Tuni River is a small tributary of the Brahmaputra River in the Indian state of Assam. Tuni river flows through the middle of the Majuli, the largest river island of the world. Sri Sri Bhogpur Satra, one of the several ancient Sattras of Assam is located near the Tuni river. Tuni river is also known as Bashistha Ganga.

== Geography ==
The Tuni river is a natural anabranch originates from Mohkhuti No.1 of Majuli district. The Tuni river is blocked now and become a stagnant pool of water. The Tuni river meets Brahmaputra River near at Bhogpur Satra of Majuli.
