= Madhya =

Madhya (Sanskrit for 'middle') may refer to:

- Madhya Pradesh, occasionally Madhya for short, a state in India
- Madhya, the middle tala in Indian classical music
- Madhya, the middle octave in Indian (especially Hindustani) classical music

== See also ==
- Madhva
- Madhya Bharat S.C., a football club in India
- Madhya Gujarat Vij, a power company in Gujarat, India
- Madhya Kailash Temple, a Hindu temple in South Africa
- Madhya Venal, a Malayalam film
- Madhya Vidyalaya, a type of school in Sri Lanka

=== Geographic locations ===
- Madhya Bharat, a former state of India
- Madhya Kailash, a location in Tamil Nadu, India
- Madhya Majuli, a location in Assam, India
- Madhya Nepal Municipality, a municipality in Nepal
