= List of Satras =

Satras are Ekasarana monasteries established by Mahapurush Shrimanta Sankardev (1449-1568 AD) and his disciples Shri Shri Madhabdev, Damodardev and also their disciples and followers in Assam and adjoining areas. The chief of a Satra is called a Satradhikar. Generally Satras are treasure troves of cultural artifacts.

== List of Satras ==
List of Satras
Name	Established	By	Location
Adi Elengi Satra	1616	Bapukrishna Dev	Lakhimpur (Bihpuria)
Akaya Satra	1500	Sankardev	Barpeta (Bajali)
Alengi Narasingha Satra	1667	Pramatta Singha	Majuli
Alengi Bahjengani Satra			Majuli
Ahatguri Bor satra	1643	SriRam Ata	Majuli (Shikoli Chapori)
Auniati Satra	1653	Jayadhwaj Singha	Majuli
Badala Satra			Narayanpur
Bali Satra			Nagaon
Baradi Satra		Madhabdev	
Barpeta Satra	1583	Madhabdev	Barpeta
Belaguri Satra	1618	Sankardev	Narayanpur
Bengenati Satra			Majuli
Bhawanipur Satra		Gopal Ata	Bhawanipur, Assam (Dist.:Barpeta/Bajali)
Bhatkuchi Satra		Keshav Charan Ata	
Batadrawa Satra		Sankardev	Nagaon
Chamaria Satra	1588	Bar Vishnu Ata	Chamaria,Boko,Kamrup
Dakshinpat Satra	1500	Banamalidev	Majuli
Dhoparguri Satra		Madhabdev	Galia,Bhawanipur,Assam (Dist.:Barpeta/Bajali)
Dihing Satra			Golaghat
Dihing Namti Satra			
Dinjoy Satra			
Ganakuchi Satra		Madhabdev	
Garamur Satra or Garamurh Satra		Lakshmikantadev	Majuli
Garpara Satra			
Gobindapur Satra	1548	Bhagabandev	Gobindapur, Pathsala(Bajali)
Guagacha Satra		Madhabdev	
Gumura Satra		Madhabdeva	
Jakai Satra	1684	Hridirup Dev	Golaghat, Sivasagar
Kamalabari Satra		Badula Padma Ata	Majuli
Kamarkuchi Than		Sankardev	
Kanara Satra		Narayan Das Ata	
Ketekibari Satra			Tezpur
Khatpar Satra	1500		Sivasagar
Kapla Satra		Madhabdev	
Khatara Satra		Lecakaniya Gobinda Ata	Mangaldoi
Madhupur Satra		Sankardev	West Bengal(Koch Behar)
Majusupa Satra			Dobok (Majusupa)
Mayamora Satra			
Moderkhat Mayamora Satra		Aniruddhadev	Moderkhat, Dibrugarh
Patbaushi Satra		Sankardev	
Patbaushi Damodar dev Satra		Damodardev	
Parabharal Satra		Mathuradas Buhra Aata	Howly
Samaguri Satra			Majuli
Ramraikuti satra			Satrasal
Hari Satra			Goreswar, BTC
Garamur Saru Satra	1582	Sri Sri Lakhmi Narayandev	Majuli
Takawbari Satra			Majuli (Sriram Chapori)
Shyamrai Satra			Goalpara
Sunpora Satra		Sankardev	
Sundaridiya Satra		Madhabdev	
Vaikunthapur Satra			
Karanga Kath Bapu Satra			
Kurekhona Gojola Satra		Soru Jodumoni	
Bahbari satra		Bor Jodumoni	
Barheramdo Satra			Kamrup
Nikamul Satra			Tezpur
Talpizar Satra			Kamrup
