= Malapindha Chilakola Miri =

- village
- Location in Assam, India
- Country: India
- State: Assam
- District: Majuli

Population (2011)
  - Total: 3,690

Languages
  - Official: Assamese
- Time zone: UTC+5:30 (IST)

Malapindha Chilakola Miri is a village located in the Majuli district, in the northeastern state of Assam, India.
