= Majuli Music Festival =

- Genre: Indie, pop, folk, rock, hip-hop, global, electronic music
- Date: November
- Location: Majuli
- Years active: 2019 - Present
- Founders: Mukul Doley, Momee Pegu
- Organiser: Majuli Music Festival Foundation (MMFF)

The Majuli Music Festival (MMF) is a non-profit indie music festival held in Majuli, Assam, India. It was founded in 2019 by Mukul Doley and his wife Momee Pegu, the founder of RIGBO.

MMF was founded to promote tourism in Majuli, and make it more self-sufficient to help cope with its annual flooding. The festival features the island's traditional music, arts and culture, local crafts and cuisine, including its traditionally brewed rice beer.
