= Missamora =

- village
- Location in Assam, India
- Country: India
- State: Assam
- District: Majuli

Population (2011)
  - Total: 836

Languages
  - Official: Assamese
- Time zone: UTC+5:30 (IST)

Missamora is a village located in the Majuli district, in the northeastern state of Assam, India.

== Demography ==
In the 2011 census, Missamora had 115 families with a population of 836, consisting of 426 males and 410 females. The population of children aged 0–6 was 109, making up 13.04% of the total population of the village. The average sex ratio was 962 out of 1000, which is higher than the state average of 958 out of 1000. The child sex ratio in the village was 912 out of 1000, which is lower than the average of 962 out of 1000 in the state of Assam.
