= Keturi Bil Khat Pam =

- village
- Location in Assam, India
- Country: India
- State: Assam
- District: Majuli

Population (2011)
  - Total: 3

Languages
  - Official: Assamese
- Time zone: UTC+5:30 (IST)

Keturi Bil Khat Pam is a village located in the Majuli district, in the northeastern state of Assam, India.

== Demography ==
In the 2011 census, Missamora had 2 families with a population of 3, consisting of 3 males and 0 females. The population of children aged 0–6 was 0, making up 0% of the total population of the village. The average sex ratio was 0 out of 1000, which is lower than the state average of 958 out of 1000. The child sex ratio in the village was 0 out of 1000, which is lower than the average of 962 out of 1000 in the state of Assam.
