= Rangachahi =

Village in Majuli, Assam, India

Rangachahi is one of the villages of Majuli island. Rangachahi is known as the heart of Majuli because it's located in the middle of the island. The village is also known for its natural charms and cultural heritage. The festival of Bhawna and Bhagavad Path are performed here.
