= Garamur Jugi Pathar =

- village
- Location in Assam, India
- Country: India
- State: Assam
- District: Majuli

Population (2011)
  - Total: 2,248

Languages
  - Official: Assamese
- Time zone: UTC+5:30 (IST)

Garamur Jugi Pathar is a village located in the Majuli district, in the northeastern state of Assam, India.

== Demography ==
In the 2011 census, Missamora had 485 families with a population of 2,248, consisting of 1,164 males and 1,084 females. The population of children aged 0–6 was 287, making up 12.77% of the total population of the village. The average sex ratio was 931 females for every 1,000 males in the village, which is lower than the state average of 958 out of 1,000. The child sex ratio in the village was 828 girls per 1,000 boys in the 0–6 age group, which is lower than the Assam state average of 962 girls per 1,000 boys.
