= Balichapori =

Village in Majuli district, Assam, India

- Village
- Interactive map of Balichapori
- Country: India
- State: Assam
- District: Majuli

Languages
  - Official: Assamese
- Time zone: UTC+5:30 (IST)
- PIN: 785104
- Telephone code: 03775
- ISO 3166 code: IN-AS

Balichapori, also Bali Chapori and Bali Chapari, is a village in the Majuli district of Assam in India. The village covers an area of 202 hectares. The population in 2011 was 2,202, in 494 households.

Its PIN code is 785104.

The educational establishments located here include:

- Luit Poriya College
- Sankardev M.E. School
- 65 No. Balichapori L.P. School

Milito Kristi Sangha is a social and cultural institution established here in 1971.

== Health Centre ==
Balichapori Health Sub Centre provides all the primary health care services.
