= Madhya Majuli =

- city
- Country: India
- State: Assam
- District: Jorhat

Languages
  - Official: Assamese
- Time zone: UTC+5:30 (IST)
- ISO 3166 code: IN-AS
- Vehicle registration: AS

Madhya Majuli is the middle part of Majuli river island, Jorhat, Assam. It is also called Natun Pohardia.

== See also ==
- Namoni Majuli
- List of educational institutes in Majuli
