= Mohkhuti No.3 =

- village
- Location in Assam, India
- Coordinates: 26.983°N 94.188°E
- Country: India
- State: Assam
- District: Majuli

Population (2011)
  - Total: 1,025

Languages
  - Official: Assamese
- Time zone: UTC+5:30 (IST)

Mohkhuti No.3 is a village that is located in the Majuli district of the northeastern state of Assam, India.
