= List of villages in Majuli =

The island is shrinking due to erosion.

This is a list of villages in Majuli, a fluvial island in the Brahmaputra River located in the Indian state of Assam. The list has the names of villages and their code.

- No. 1 Phutuki
- Natun pohardia
- Param Chapori (150010006000600001)
- Kakila Gaon (150010006000600002)
- Jamuguri (150010006000600008)
- Kashikata Natun Chapari (150010006000600009)
- Salmari (150010006000600012)
- Hutar (150010006000600023)
- Garu Chapari (150010006000600026)
- Chayani (150010006000600029)
- Tenga Chapari (150010006000600030)
- Shayang Missing (150010006000600031)
- Shayang Chapari (150010006000600032)
- Missing Chapari (150010006000600033)
- Baghmora (150010006000600042)
- Uzirati (150010006000600043)
- Misa Mora (150010006000600045)
- Chengeli Suti (150010006000600046)
- Majar Chapari (150010006000600048)
- Ari Chapari (150010006000600049)
- Rowmora (150010006000600050)
- Rowmora Letera (150010006000600051)
- Kamalia Chapari (150010006000600052)
- Pohumora Vekeli (150010006000600054)
- Bebezia (150010006000600059)
- Molual Kalita (150010006000600060)
- Molual Koibarta Miri (150010006000600061)
- Okhal Chuk (150010006000600062)
- Molual Miri (150010006000600063)
- Birali Para (150010006000600064)
- Kalia Gaon (150010006000600069)
- Bhalukmora
- Dekasenchowa Gaon(150010006000600...)
- Thakurbari Gaon(150010006000600...)
- Dekasenchowa Balichapori Gaon(150010006000600...)
- Gowal Gaon (150010006000600070)
- Borduar Chapari (150010006000600071)
- Molapindha Chilakola Miri (150010006000600072)
- Balichapori (150010006000600073)
- Chilakola Kaibarta (150010006000600074)
- Alengi Gaon (150010006000600075)
- Bora Chuk (150010006000600076)
- Bengena Ati Purani Satra (150010006000600078)
- Natun Kartick Chapari (150010006000600081)
- kartick Chapari (150010006000600082)
- Sarasawa Beel (150010006000600084)
- Boralengi Satra (150010006000600085)
- No.2 Borgoya (150010006000600087)
- Barun Chitadar Chuk (150010006000600089)
- Natun Bedang Chapari (150010006000600090)
- Kaibarta Gaon (150010006000600091)
- Garamur Satra (150010006000600092)
- Katoni Gaon Na-Satra (150010006000600098)
- Nam Katani (150010006000600099)
- Daria Gaon (150010006000600101)
- Garamur Phutuki (150010006000600102)
- Garamur Jogi Pathar (150010006000600103)
- Manika Pathar (150010006000600104)
- Natun kalamua Chapari (150010006000600105)
- Ujani Jokai Boa (150010006000600107)
- Pakajara Miri (150010006000600108)
- Bengena Kalia (150010006000600109)
- Jogi Gaon (150010006000600110)
- No.3 Mohkhuti (150010006000600111)
- Kakatibari (150010006000600112)
- No.1 Mohkhuti (150010006000600113)
- No.2 Mohkhuti (150010006000600114)
- Pohardia (150010006000600115)
- Bhogpur Pathar (150010006000600119)
- Bhogpur Satra (150010006000600120)
- Bhogpur Miri (150010006000600121)
- No.3 Bhuramara (150010006000600122)
- No.2 Gualbari (150010006000600123)
- Pakajara Village (150010006000600124)
- Kalia Gaon1 (150010006000600126)
- Jamud Chuk (150010006000600127)
- Nagan Chuk (150010006000600128)
- Ranga Chahi (150010006000600129)
- Gualbari (150010006000600130)
- Jorbeel (150010006000600131)
- Gossai Bari (150010006000600132)
- Pohumora (150010006000600133)
- No.1 Bhuramora (150010006000600134)
- No.2 Bhuramora (150010006000600135)
- Bura Sensowa (150010006000600137)
- Motia Bari (150010006000600138)
- Sumoimari (150010006000600140)
- Mekheli Gaon (150010006000600144)
- Dhoua Challa (150010006000600146)
- Sukansuti Pathar (150010006000600148)
- No.2 Bornoloni (150010006000600149)
- No.1 Bornoloni (150010006000600150)
- Howli (150010006000600151)
- Korki Chuk (150010006000600154)
- Korki Chuk1 (150010006000600155)
- Jengrai Chapari (150010006000600156)
- Moghua Chuk (150010006000600157)
- Jengrai Miri (150010006000600158)
- Gobor Chuk (150010006000600159)
- No.2 Borpomua (150010006000600160)
- No.1 Borpomua (150010006000600161)
- Bhew Chuk Kumar Bari (150010006000600162)
- Bhew Chuk (150010006000600163)
- No.1 Namani Cerpai (150010006000600165)
- Polongani (150010006000600167)
- Siram Chapari (150010006000600168)
- No.2 Ujani Chapari (150010006000600169)
- Borbeel Bebejia (150010006000600173)
- Foot chang (150010006000600174)
- Kuhiar Bari (150010006000600175)
- Deuri Gaon Pam (150010006000600176)
- Rangali Bahar (150010006000600177)
- Deuri Gaon (150010006000600178)
- Abhoi Puria (150010006000600179)
- Bokajan Miri (150010006000600180)
- Owguri Baghpam (150010006000600181)
- Bagar Gaon (150010006000600182)
- Gayan Gaon1 (150010006000600183)
- Gayan Chuk (150010006000600184)
- Mera Ghorh (150010006000600186)
- Chama Guri (150010006000600190)
- Dakhin Pat satra (150010006000600191)
- Kohal Gaon (150010006000600192)
- Goroi Mari (150010006000600193)
- Atoi Chuk (150010006000600194)
- Borboka Pathar (150010006000600195)
- Kamjan Alengi (150010006000600198)
- Sarala Pathar (150010006000600201)
- Ratanpur Gavorumalia (150010006000600205)
- Kathal Khowa (150010006000600207)
- Kathal Khowa Pam (150010006000600208)
- Tatibari (150010006000600209)
- Mayangia (150010006000600210)
- Panikhati (150010006000600211)
- Kandhuli Mari (150010006000600212)
- Chawrekia (150010006000600216)
- No.2 Anichuk (150010006000600218)
- Gejera (150010006000600219)
- Kachari Gaon (150010006000600221)
- Apechi Pathar (150010006000600222)
- Baligaon (150010006000600223)
- Ponia Gaon (150010006000600224)
- Bonoria Chapari (150010006000600229)
- Sikari Gaon (150010006000600231)
- Jabar Chuk Katani (150010006000600237)
- Jabar Chuk (150010006000600238)
- Dablee Chapari (150010006000600241)
- Takar Chapari (150010006000600242)
- Furfuria Chapari (150010006000600243)
- Sesuguri Chapari (150010006000600244)
- Kamalpur Gaon (15001006000600245)
- Mohkina Gaon (15001006000600246)
- Upperkatoni Gaon (15001006000600247)
- Deodia ati Gaon (15001006000600248)
- Kamar Gaon
- Potia Gaon
- Totoya Gaon
- Rawana Gaon
- Saringa Ati
- Bihimpur Satra
- Hazarika Gaon
- Gopalpur Gaon
- Gereki Gaon
- Raidangoni
- Garamur Jugi Pathar

== See also ==
- List of educational institutes in Majuli

== Sources ==
- Jorhat (Up to Apr-09)
- List of Majuli Villages
