= Garamur Phutuki Chapori =

- village
- Location in Assam, India
- Country: India
- State: Assam
- District: Majuli

Population (2011)
  - Total: 5,085

Languages
  - Official: Assamese
- Time zone: UTC+5:30 (IST)

Garamur Phutuki Chapori is a village located in the Majuli district, in the northeastern state of Assam, India.

== Demography ==
In the 2011 census, Missamora had 598 families with a population of 2,820, consisting of 1,478 males and 1,342 females. The population of children aged 0–6 was 411, making up 14.57% of the total population of the village. The average sex ratio was 908 out of 1000, which is lower than the state average of 958 out of 1000. The child sex ratio in the village was 899 out of 1000, which is lower than the average of 962 out of 1000 in the state of Assam.
