= Madhupur Satra =

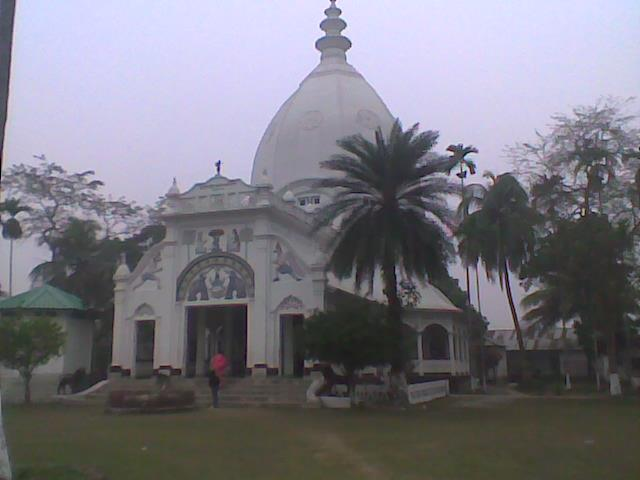
- Madhupur Satra

- Location within West Bengal

Religion
- Affiliation: Hinduism
- District: Cooch Behar (West Bengal)
- Festivals: Raasleela, Dol Purnima

Location
- State: West Bengal
- Country: India
- Coordinates: 26.363537°N 89.378220°E

Architecture
- Creator: Nara Narayan
- Completed: Mid 16th-century (Approx.)
- Inscriptions: Assamese

Website
- www.madhupursatra.org

Madhupur Satra is a religious institutional center associated with the Ekasarana tradition of Vaishnavism, situated in Cooch Behar, the Indian state of West Bengal. It was established by Assamese Vaishnavite monasteries for religious practices in the mid-16th century during Koch kingdom (1515–1949). The great Bhakti Saint Mahapurusha Srimanta Sankardeva (1449–1568) and his disciple Mahapurusha Madhavadeva died here. Madhupur satra is also called as Dahmukutor than; 'dahmukut' means 'bhiti' or living houses of ten disciples (bhaktas) of Srimanta Sankardeva. The name satra originates in the Bhagavata Purana in Sanskrit (sattra), and is used in the sense of an assembly of devotees.

== Geography ==
Places in the Cooch Behar Sadar subdivision in Cooch Behar district
CT: census town, M: municipal town, R: rural/ urban centre, H: historical/ religious centre
Owing to space constraints in the small map, the actual locations in a larger map may vary slightly

=== Location ===
Madhupur Satra is located at 26.363537°N 89.378220°E.

Note: The map alongside presents some of the notable locations in the subdivision. All places marked in the map are linked in the larger full screen map.

== Establishment ==
This satra buildings were built by Nara Narayan of the Koch dynasty in the mid-16th century. After independence of India, Mahendra Mohan Choudhury, chief minister of Assam rebuilt the houses, Namghar, roads with brick and mortar and built Sankardev's temple in January, 1968 with help of 'Madhupur Satra Samiti'.

== Satradhikar ==
Monks, called "bhakats", live in satras under a "satradhikar" or "Mahanta". The main disciple of Srimanta Sankardeva was Madhavdev. Before death of Sankardeva, he gave the responsibility to his disciple Madhavadeva (died 1596 AD), to take care of the Satras. He laid down the system of daily prayer service and initiated the system of religious tithes.Later, Achyut guru, Shree Ram Ata, bishnu Ata became satradhikar of Madupur satra. After death of Bishnu Ata, 'Samuha' (bhaktas of some nearest villages) took responsibility of this satra. Later, Burhir-po Gobinda Atoi, Gopinath Atoi, Krishna Bapu Satriya, Ramnath Bapu Satriya, Gangaram Bapu Satriya, Pocharam vorali Atoi, Niron Atoi, Tolon Atoi, Lakshmikanta Atoi burha-bhakta, Fatik Chandra Dev Goswami took responsibility as Satradhikar. After the death of Fatik Chandra Dev Goswami, Lakshmikanta Mahanta became Satradhikar of Madhupur satra on 18 April 2012.

== Structures ==
The Satra is four-sided enclosed area with four gateways ("karapat"). Centrally placed in this enclosure is a rectangular prayer-hall ("Namghar" or "kirtanghar") at the aligned in the east–west direction. On its eastern side there is an additional independent structure called the "Manikut" (jewel-house), the sanctum santorum, in which the "asana", a wooden tetradehral structure with four carved lions), is placed containing the main object of worship (usually a copy of the Bhagavat Purana in manuscript or an idol). The "namghar" is surrounded by four straight rows of huts, called "hati", in which monks (bhakats) reside. The adhikara and other high officers of the Satra reside in the eastern "hatis".

== Cultural programmes ==
Some of the cultural programmes, which are held in Sattras:

- Bhaona
- Doul utsav or Deul
- Janmastami
- Rasa lila or Raas utsav
- Sankardeva's birth anniversary celebration in October
- First Satradhikar Gobinda Ata's death anniversary celebration in Magh (January–February) month

== Madhupur Satra picture gallery ==
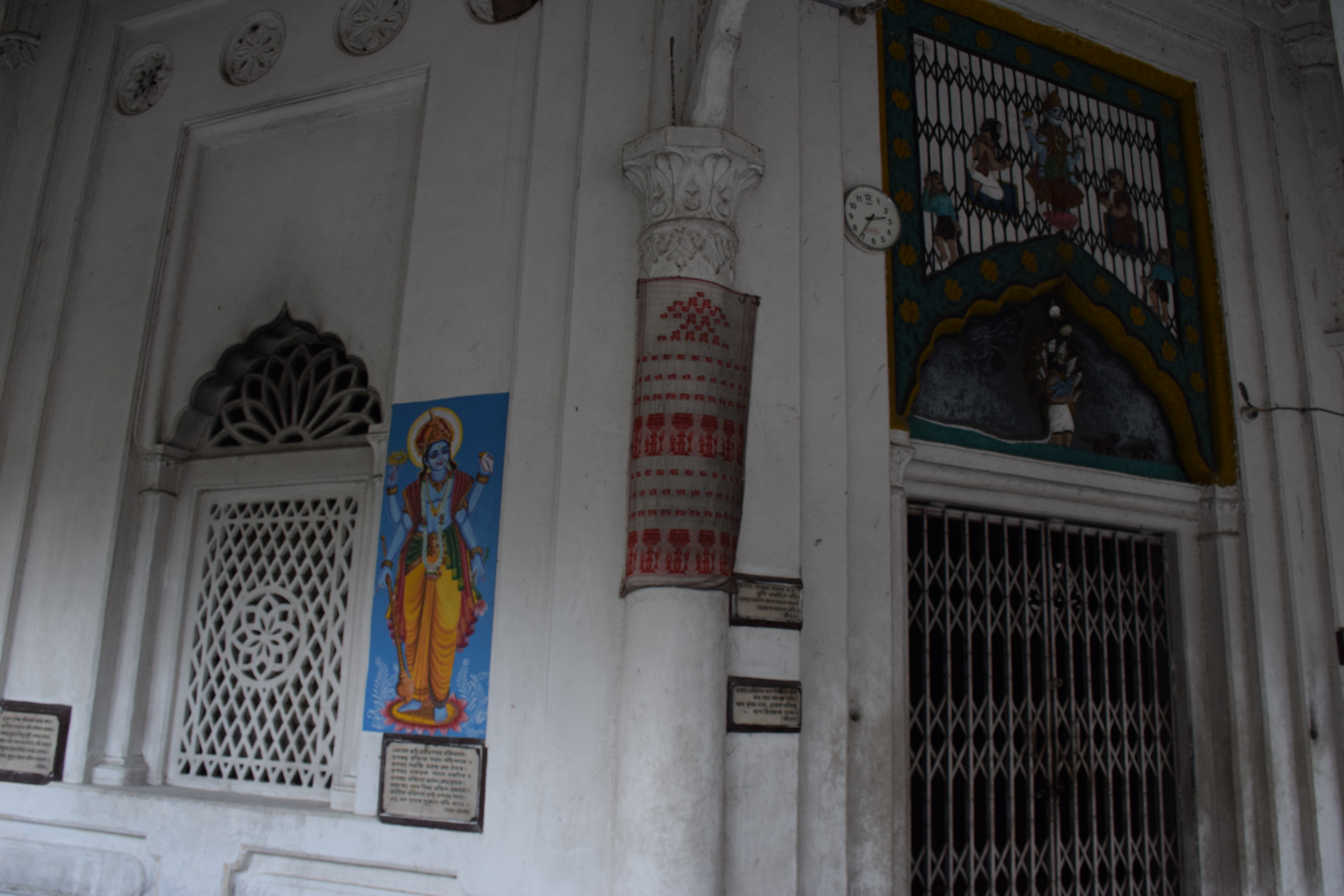

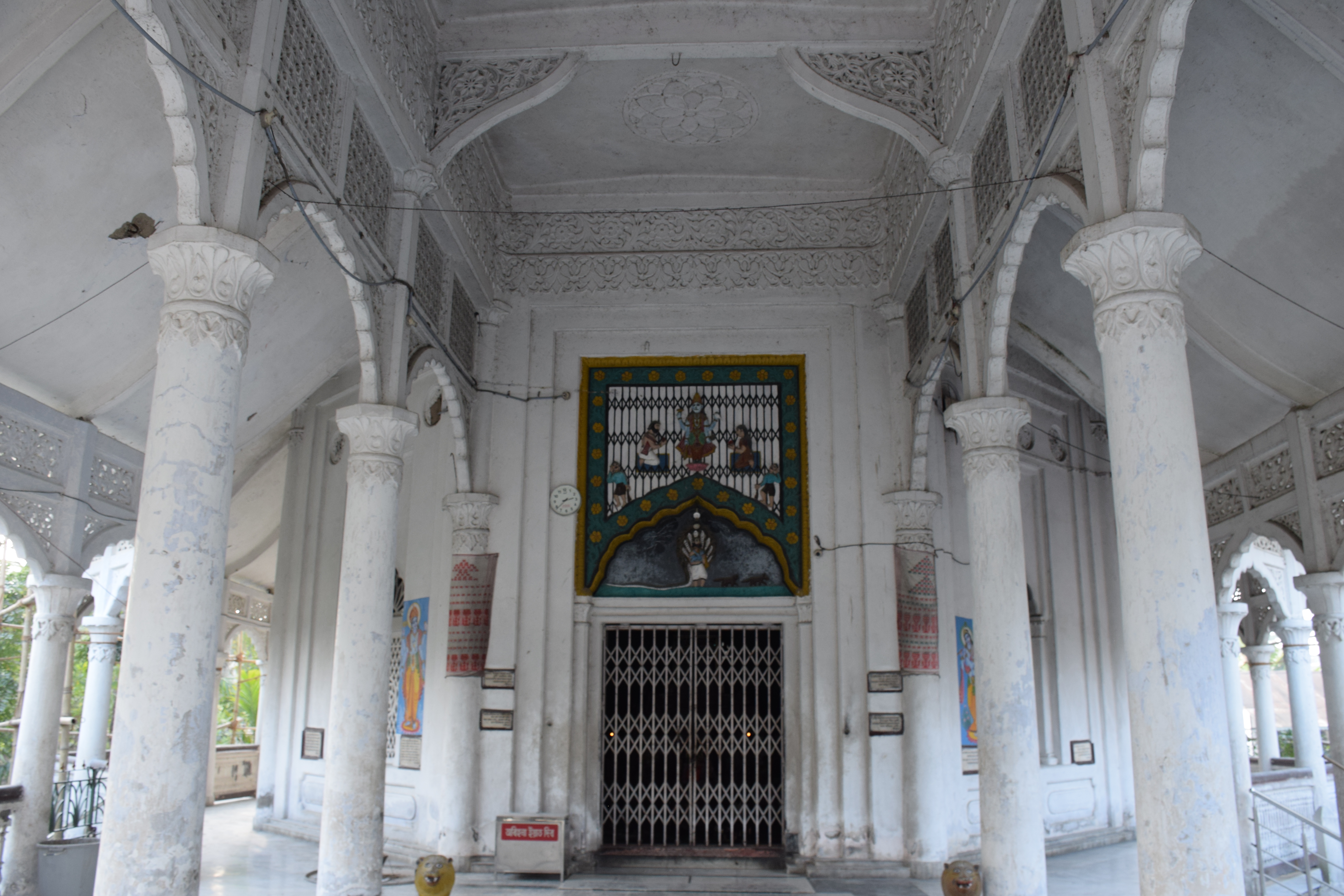

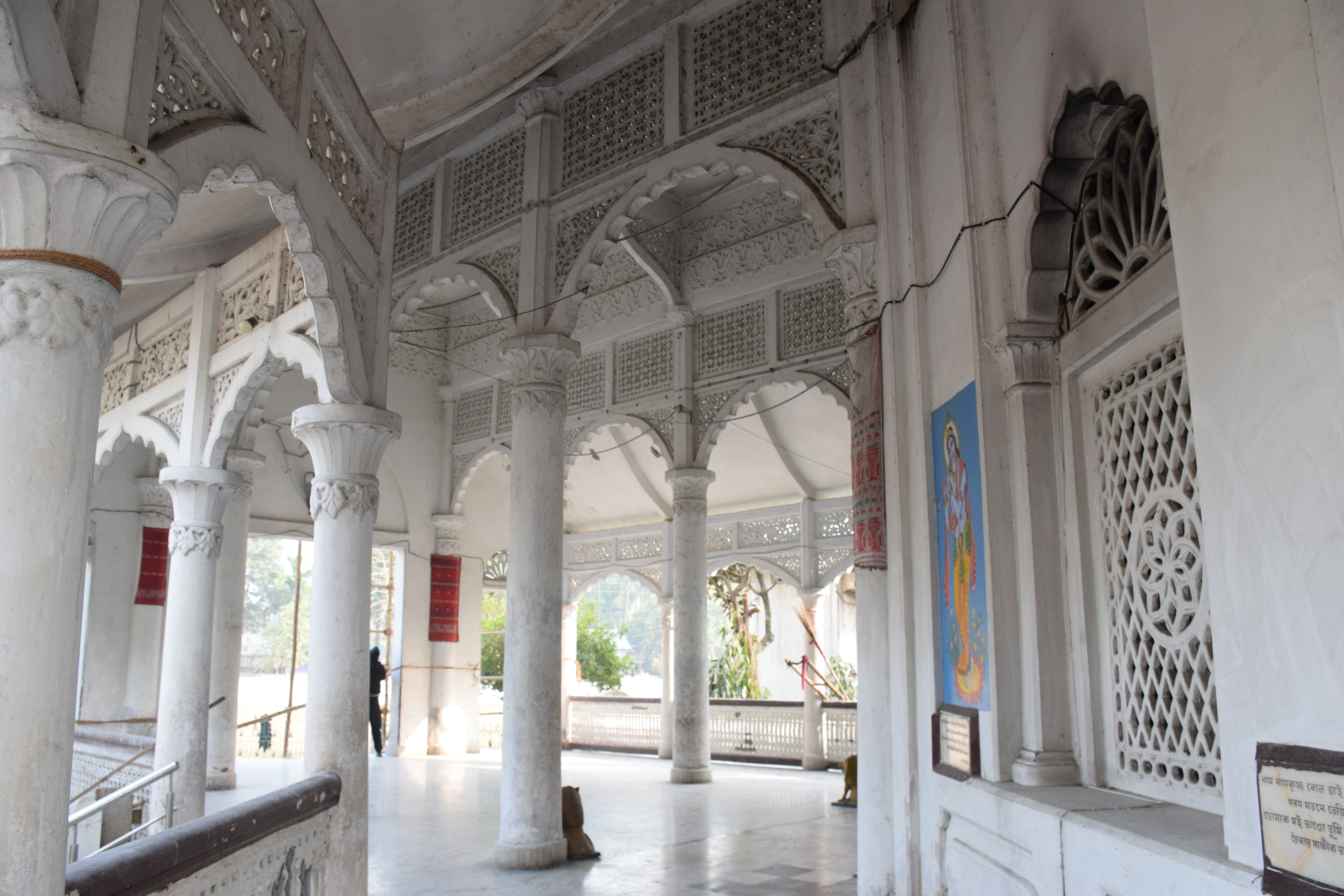

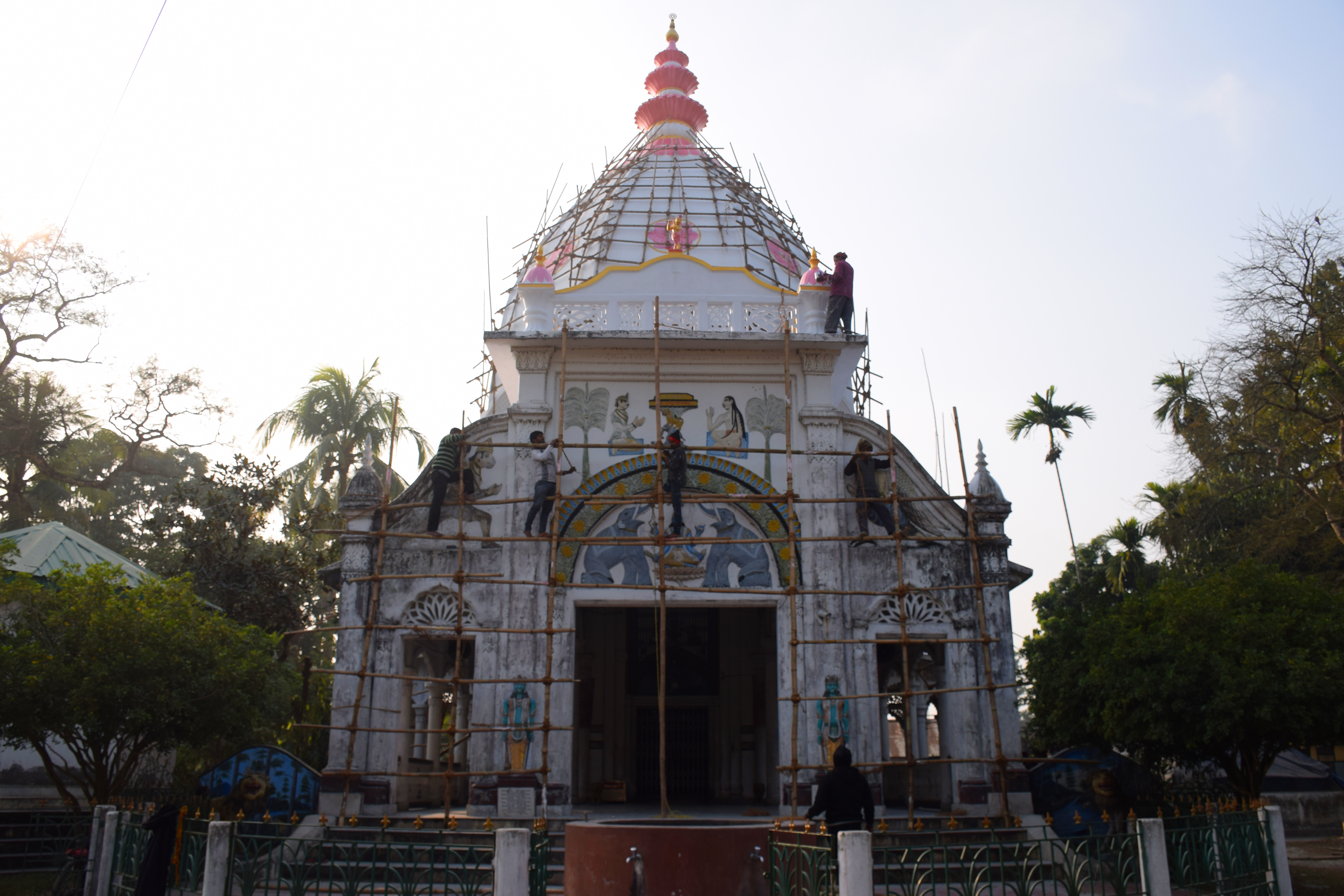

== See also ==
- List of Satras
- Sattriya
- Barpeta Satra
- Dakshinpat Satra
