= Totoya Gaon =

Totoya Gaon is a village in Majuli district, in the state of Assam, India.
