= List of educational institutes in Majuli =

This is a list of educational institutes in Majuli, a fluvial island in the Brahmaputra River in the Indian state of Assam.

== Universities ==
- Majuli University of Culture
- National Institute of Electronics & Information Technology

== Colleges ==
- Majuli College
- Jengraimukh College
- Pub Majuli College
- Garamur Pitamberdev College
- UMK College

== Junior colleges ==
- Island Academy, Kamalabari

== Schools ==
- Auniati High School
- Majuli Auniati Hemchandra High School
- Keshab Ram Borah High School
- Karatipar High School
- Vivekananda Kendra Vidyalaya, Majuli
- St. Paul's School, Majuli
- Jengraimukh Higher Secondary School
- Madhya Majuli Parijat Higher Secondary School
- Pitambar dev higher Secondary School
- Island Academy, Kamalabari
- C.S. Rawanapar Model H.S. School, Rawanapar

== L P Schools ==
- 17 No. Bechamora L.P. School
- 65 No. Balichapori L.P. School
- 82 No. Borgoyan No. 2 L.P. School

19 No Baghar Gaon Primary School

== Computer institutes ==
- CEC Majuli, Garamur, Majuli
- CEC Pub Majuli, opp. Pub Majuli College, Bongaon
- CEC Phulani, near Phulani Outpost, Phulani
- ICE Majuli, Bongaon
- NEDS
- Nielit Majuli Study Centre, Garmur

== See also ==
- List of villages in Majuli
- Bortani Gaon
