= Majuli University of Culture =

State university in India

- Type: State
- Established: 1 June 2018
- Affiliations: UGC
- Chancellor: Governor of Assam
- Vice-Chancellor: Nirode Boruah
- Location: Majuli, Assam, India; 26.9969°N 94.1416°E
- Campus: Suburban
- Website: muoc.ac.in

Majuli University of Culture is a state government university located in Majuli, Assam dedicated for research, teaching and education in the field of humanities and performing arts. The university is established by Majuli University of Culture Bill, 2017 which was passed by the Government of Assam on 7 September 2017. Recently, the Government of Assam announced that the university will be upgraded to a full-fledged University having Humanities, Commerce and Science disciplines apart from the Cultural and Performing Arts part catering to the need of the common people of Majuli District and rest of the state in sync with the New Education Policy. On 13 July 2018 Chief Minister Sarbananda Sonowal laid the foundation stone for the state's first cultural university at Majuli to be built at an estimated cost of Rs 300 crore.

On 21 September 2022 Professor Nirode Boruah took oath as the Vice Chancellor of the Majuli University of Culture at a function held in Raj Bhavan.
