= Mohkhuti No.1 =

- village
- Location in Assam, India
- Coordinates: 26.942°N 94.181°E
- Country: India
- State: Assam
- District: Majuli

Population (2011)
  - Total: 348

Languages
  - Official: Assamese
- Time zone: UTC+5:30 (IST)

Mohkhuti No.1 is a village located in the Majuli district, in the northeastern state of Assam, India.
