= Majuli =

River Island in Assam, Northeast India

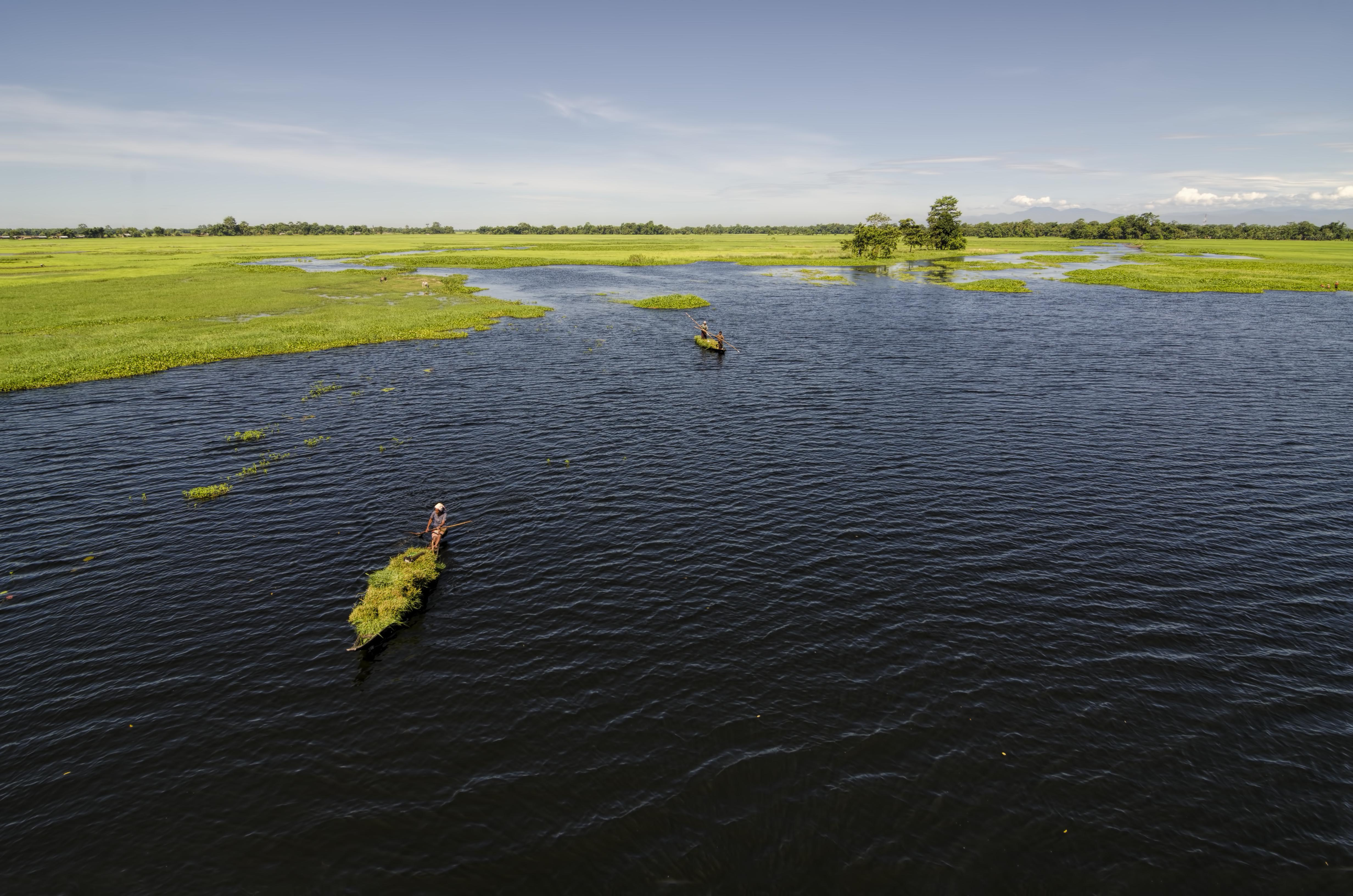
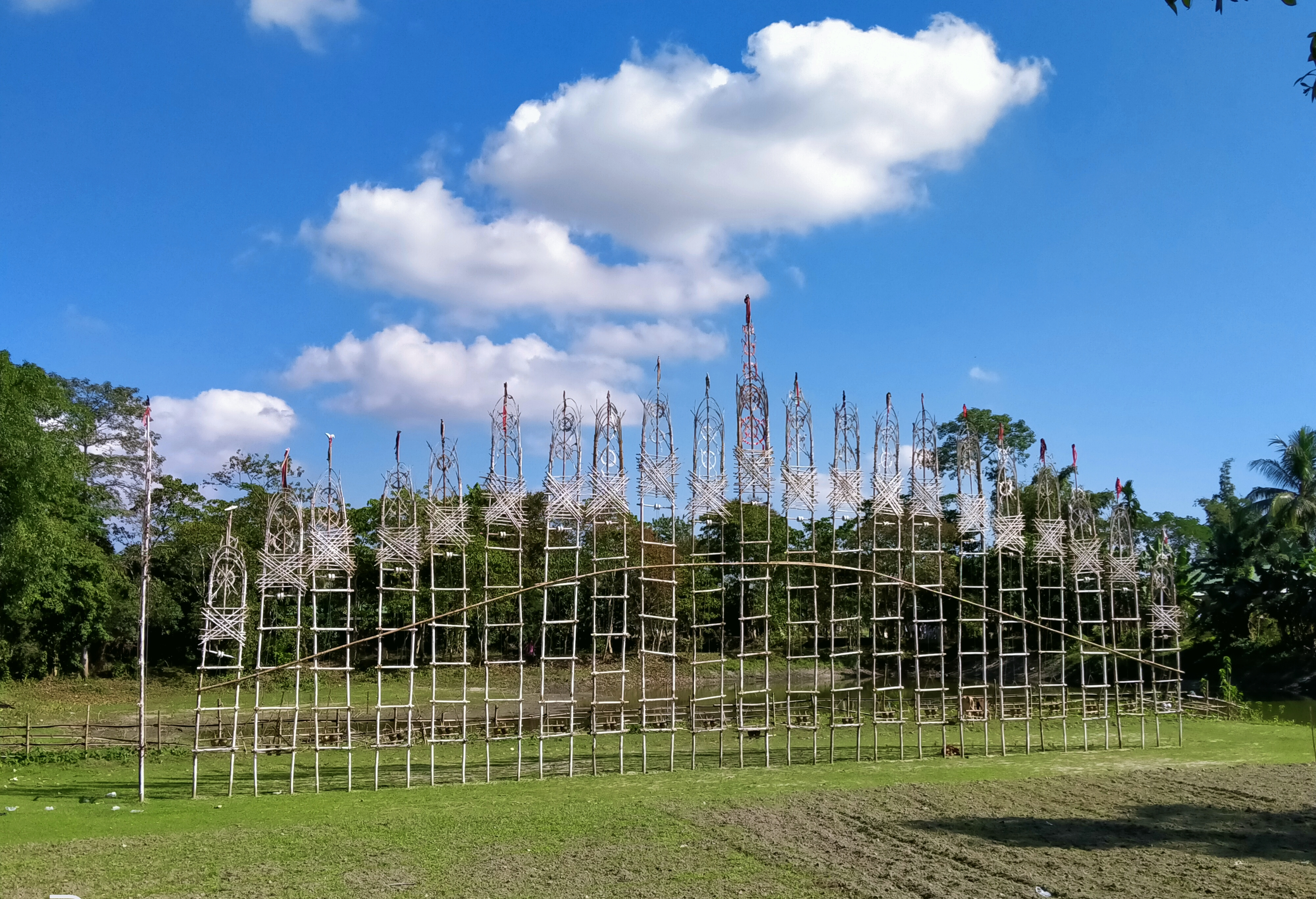
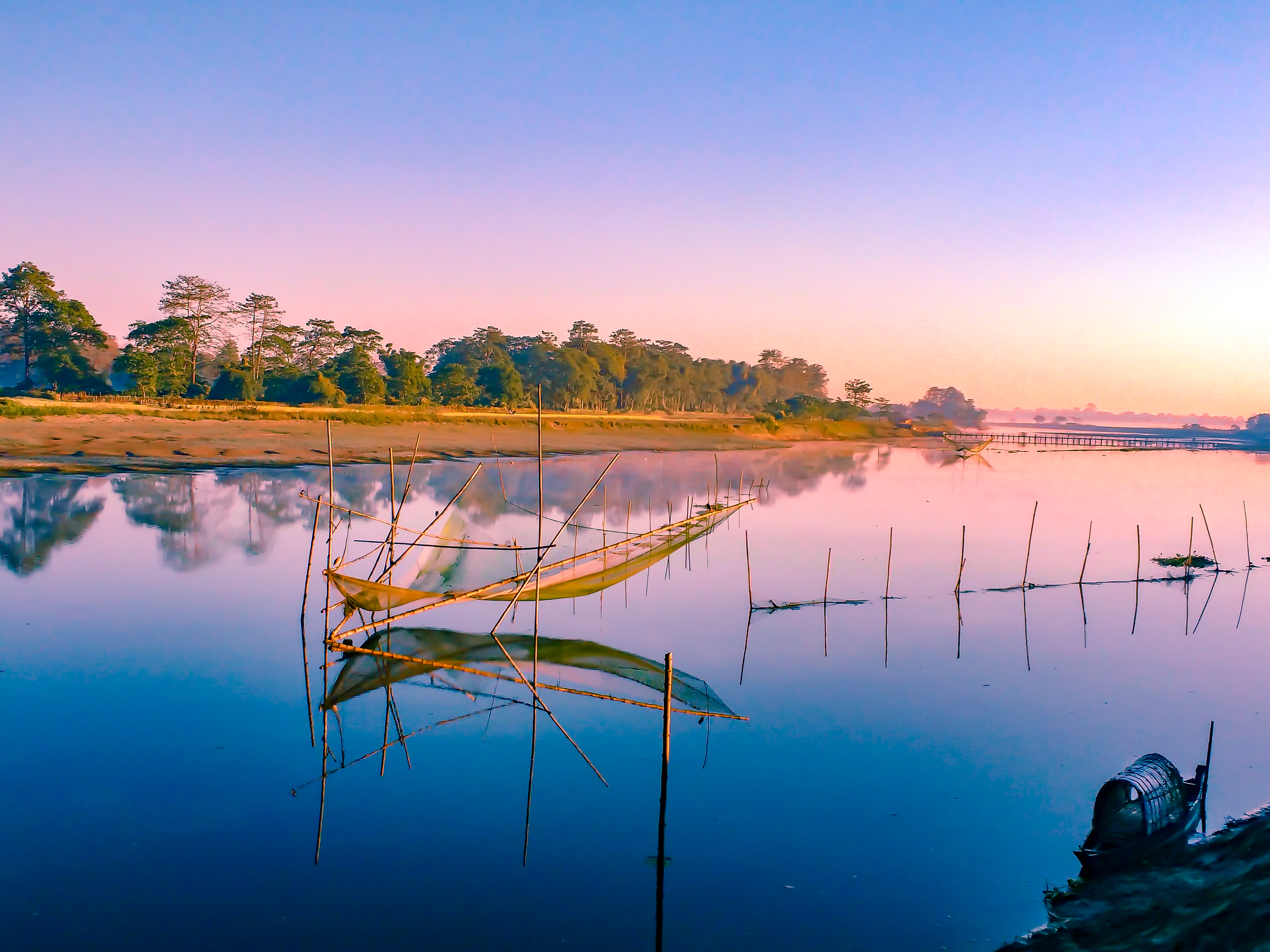
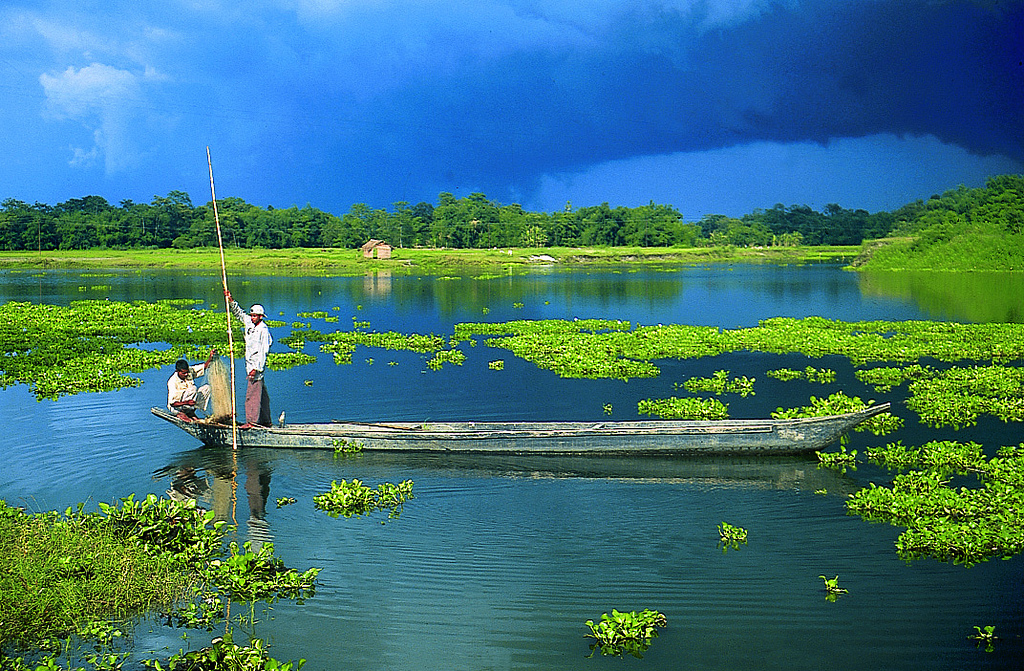
- From top, left to right: Doriya River of Majuli; Kherkoitia River; an anabranch of the Brahmaputra

- Location within Assam

Geography
- Location: Brahmaputra River
- Coordinates: 27°00′N 94°13′E
- Area: 880 km^{2} (340 sq mi)
- Highest elevation: 84.5 m (277.2 ft)

Administration
- Country India
- State: Assam
- District: Majuli

Demographics
- Population: 167,304 (2011)
- Pop. density: 300/km^{2} (800/sq mi)
- Ethnic groups: Mising, Deori, Kaibarta, Sonowal Kacharis, Koch, Ahom, Sutiya, Kalita, Gorkhas, Brahmin, Sut, Nath (yogi) groups

Additional information
- Time zone: IST (UTC+5:30)
- PIN: 785102, 785104, 785105, 785110, 785106
- Telephone code: 03775
- Vehicle registration: AS-29
- Deputy Commissioner Srishti Singh

Majuli (also spelled Majoli) is the largest river island in Assam, a state in Northeast India. It is bordered by the Brahmaputra River to the south and east, the Subansiri River to the west, and an anabranch of the Brahmaputra to the north.

The island is inhabited by members of the Mising, Deori, and Sonowal Kachari tribes, and serves as a hub of Assamese neo-Vaishnavite culture. It is accessible by ferry or boat from Jorhat, which is located approximately 250 kilometers northeast of Guwahati.

Majuli became the first island in India to be designated as a district in 2016. Majuli has been listed on the UNESCO Tentative List since March 2004, classified under the Cultural category as part of its World Heritage nomination process.

== Largest river island ==
Majuli is recognized by Guinness World Records as the world's largest inland river island, with it being bordered by the Subansiri River to its north and the Brahmaputra River to its south. However, the Encyclopædia Britannica cites Bananal Island in Brazil as the largest river island in the world.

== History ==
Majuli is a long and slender river island located in the Brahmaputra River in Assam, India. It developed as a result of geomorphological changes caused by floods and shifting river courses. The island lies between two channels: the Brahmaputra to the north and the Burhi Dihing to the south. The Brahmaputra and one of its major tributaries, the Dihing, once flowed parallel and close to each other. Between 1661 and 1696, a series of earthquakes set the stage for a massive flood in 1750, reshaping the region. The extreme flood of 1750 appears to have diverted part of the Brahmaputra's flow through the Dihing channel, about 190 km upstream of its former confluence. Its southern branch became known as the Burhi Xuti, while the northern branch turned into the Luit Xuti. Over time, the Luit Xuti diminished and became the Kerkota Xuti, while the Burhi Xuti expanded into the present-day main channel of the Brahmaputra.

The land between the Dihing and the Brahmaputra, corresponding largely to present-day Majuli, was originally part of the Chutia kingdom. It is known from Buranjis that the Chutia official Manik Chandra Barua first received the news of Ahom invasion of Dihing/Majuli and marched against them. Battles were fought at Dihing-mukh(present-day southern Majuli), Dikhou Mukh, Shira ati and Cheruakata in the Majuli region. Following the Ahom conquest, it was reorganised as the Mung-klang (Dihing) province of the Ahom kingdom, administered under the newly created office of Dihingia Gohain by Suhungmung in 1525.

In the first half of the 17th century, the Ahom king Pratap Singha built a rampart on Majuli called Meragarh. Lakshmi Singha, an Ahom king who reigned from 1769 to 1780, wrote a grant in 1776 referring to "Majuli Pradesh" and its Kamalabari Satra, Agnichapori, Gajala Satra, and the Tuni River. During the Moamaria rebellion, the island was controlled by Howha, a Moamaria rebel leader.

Majuli emerged as a cultural and religious centre of Assam in the 16th century, following the visit of the social reformer Srimanta Sankardev. Sankardev, a leader of the neo-Vaishnavite movement, propagated Vaishnavism and established monasteries (known as satras) on the island. These institutions became important centres of Assamese religion, culture, and art.

The establishment of satras turned Majuli into a major hub of Vaishnavism, a role it has retained for centuries. Under British colonial rule and following India's independence in 1947, the island continued to be recognized as a centre of Assamese culture. It is also noted for being the world's largest river island.

Over the 19th and 20th centuries, Majuli experienced severe erosion, significantly reducing its size. In the 1790s, the island covered about 1,300 km^{2} (500 sq mi). By the early 20th century, its area had declined slightly to 1,255 km^{2} (485 sq mi). As of 2024, continuous erosion had reduced Majuli's area to approximately 880 km^{2} (340 sq mi).

== Culture and demography ==
=== Population ===
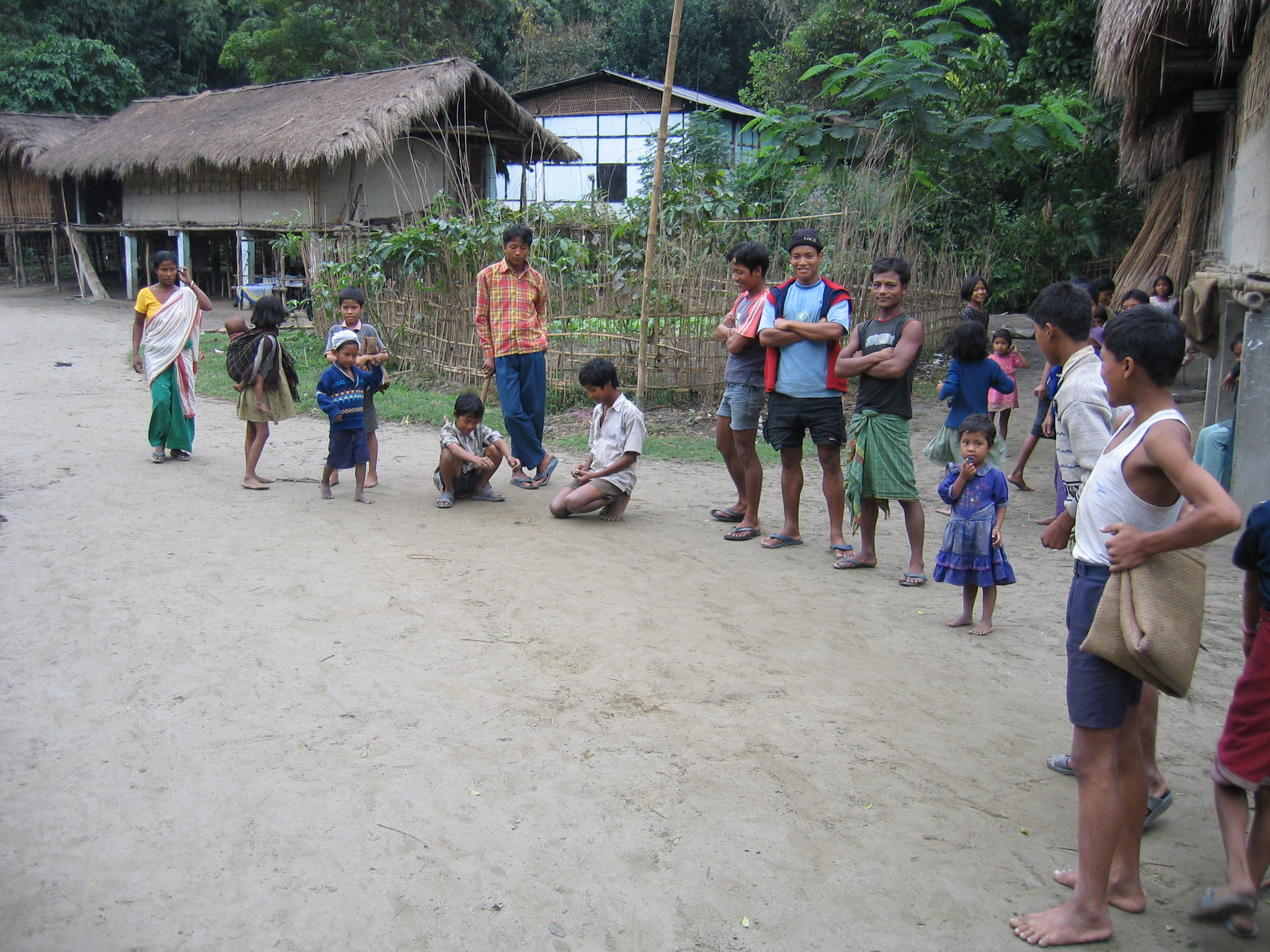
A village in Majuli

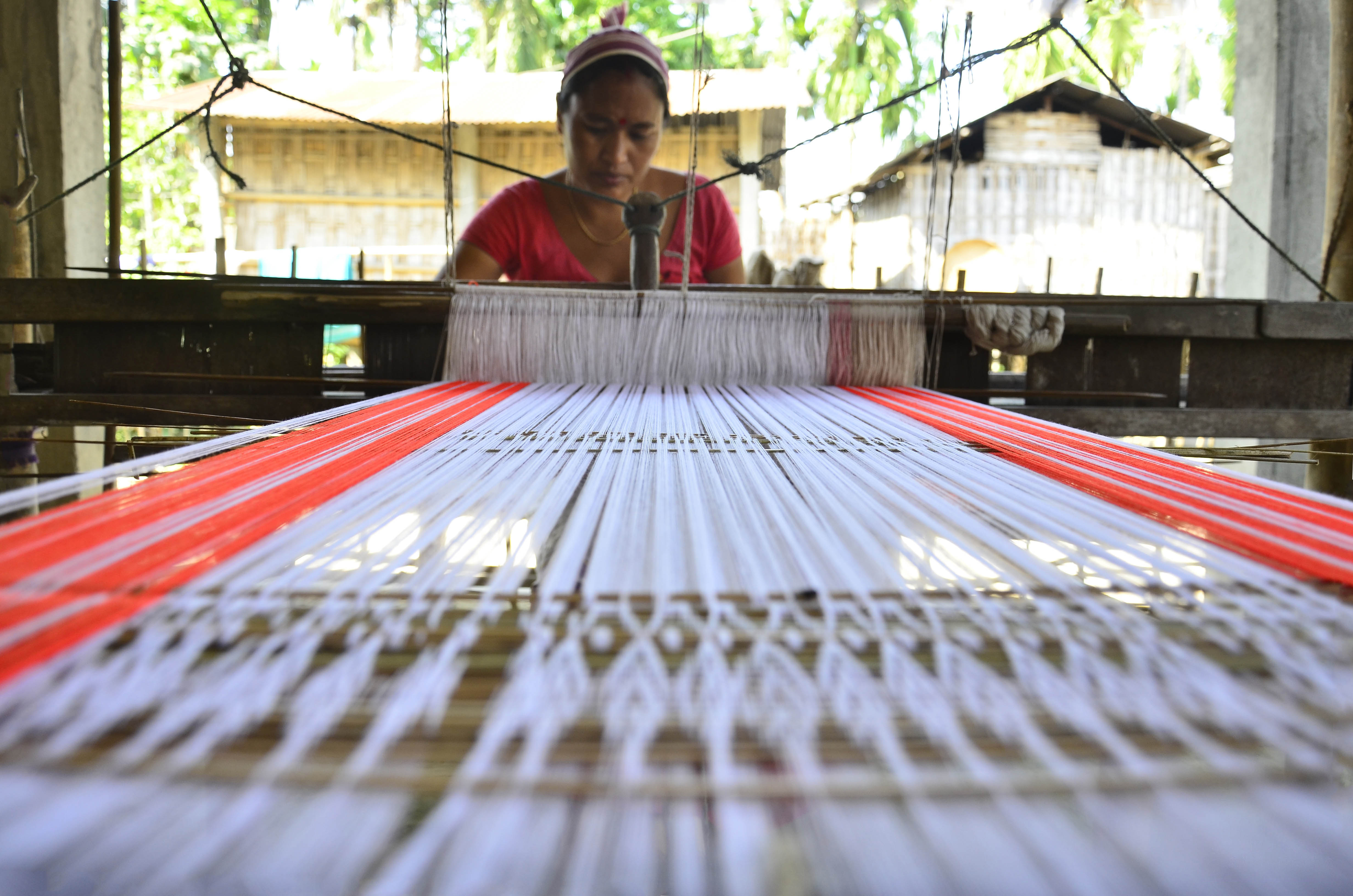
A Deori community woman weaving gamusa

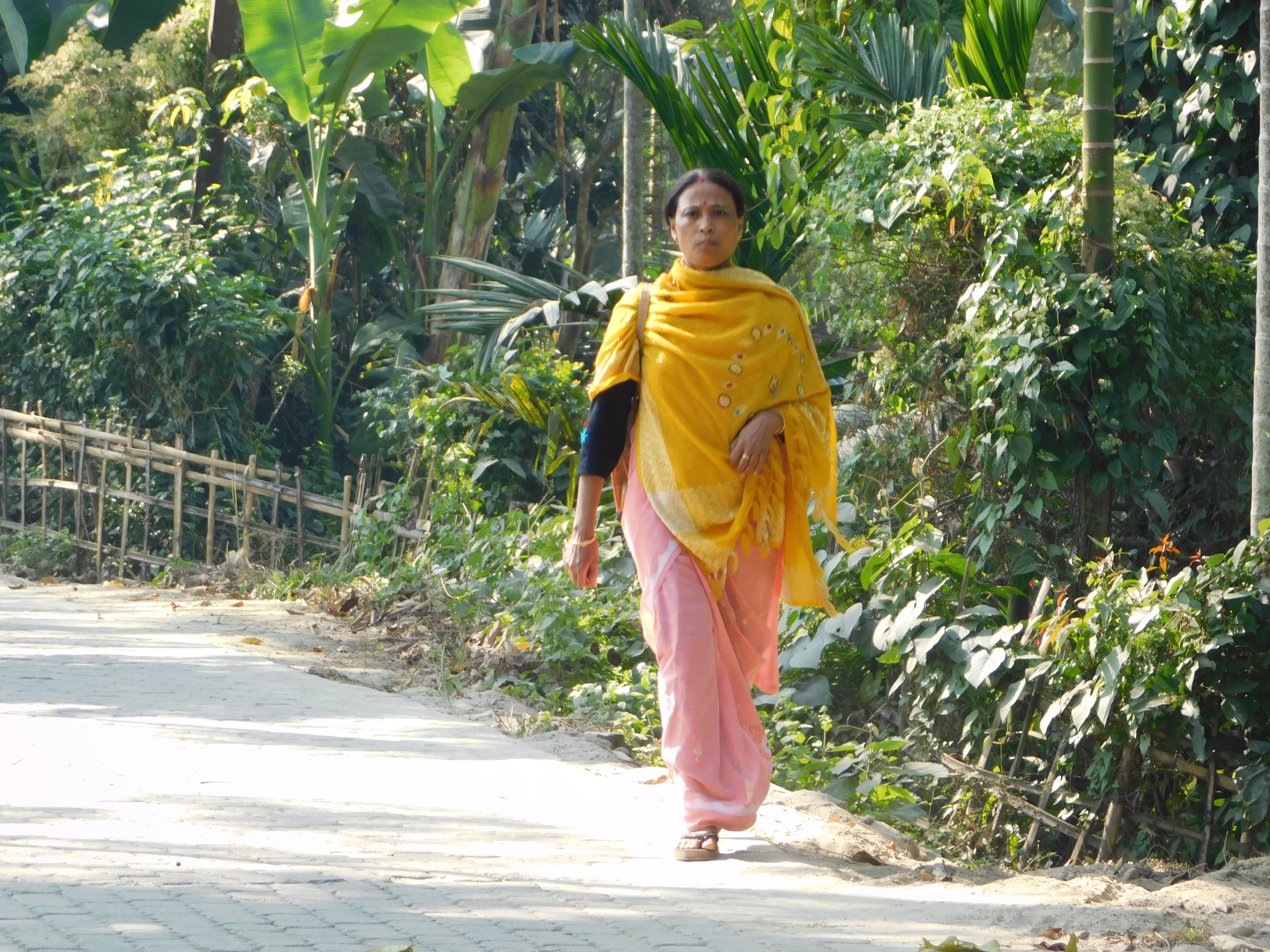
From Kamalabari

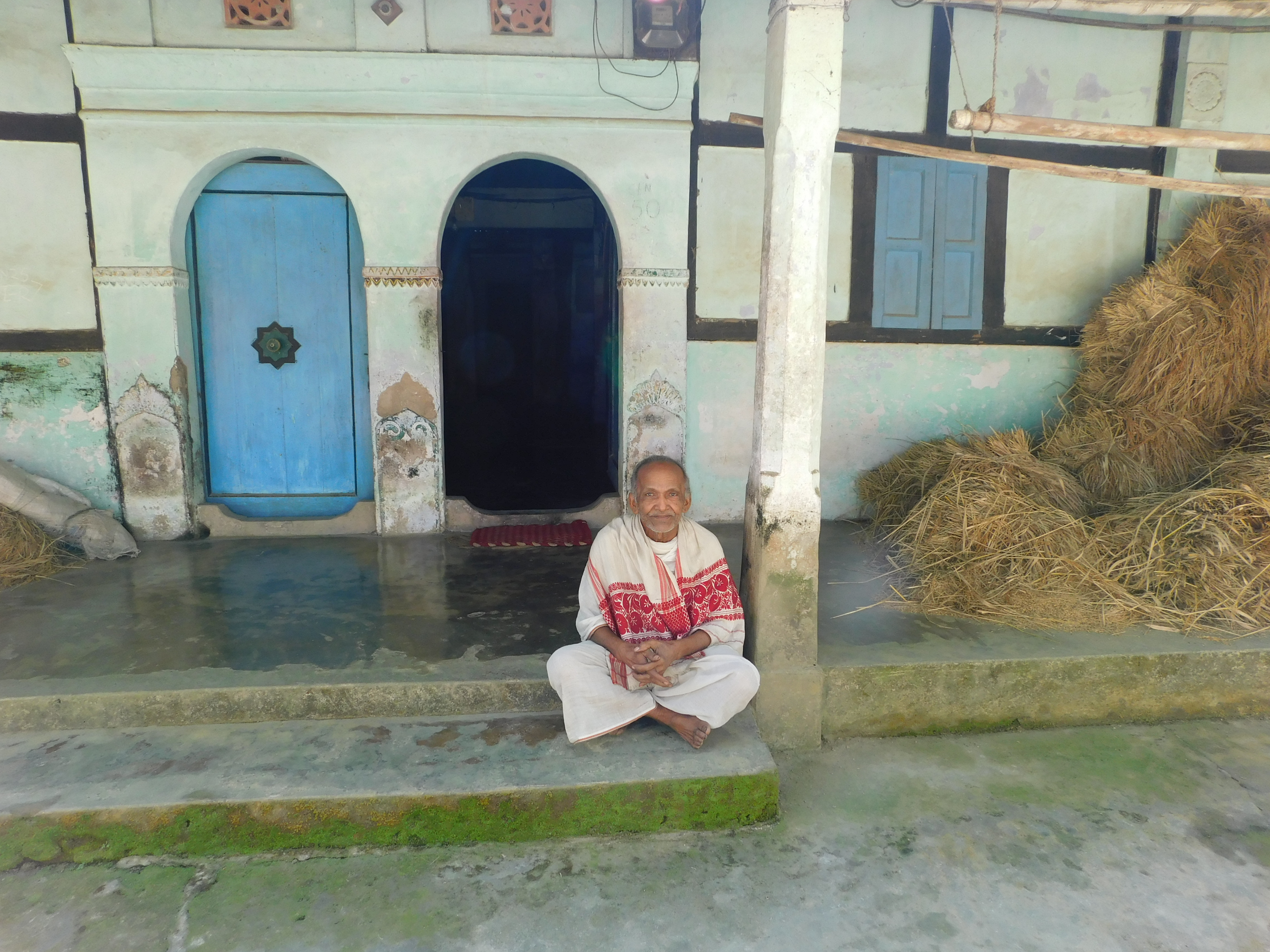
Kamalabari Satra

The population of Majuli consists of 46.38% scheduled tribes and 14.27% scheduled castes, as well as non-tribal castes of Hindu Assamese. 99.04% of the island's population follows Hinduism. The Indigenous communities include members of the Mising (41.01%), Deori, Kaibarta, and Sonowal Kachari tribes. The non-tribal caste Hindu Assamese communities include Koch, Kalita, Ahom, Sutiya, and Jogi. The languages spoken are Mising, Assamese, and Deori. The island has 144 villages with a population of over 150,000, resulting in a density of 300 individuals per square kilometer.

A ferry service connecting Majuli to Jorhat operates six times a day, and night buses run from Guwahati to Majuli via Lakhimpur. Despite various challenges, modernization has reached the island with the establishment of medical centres and schools. Housing has also transitioned from traditional bamboo and mud structures to concrete buildings.

=== Festivals ===
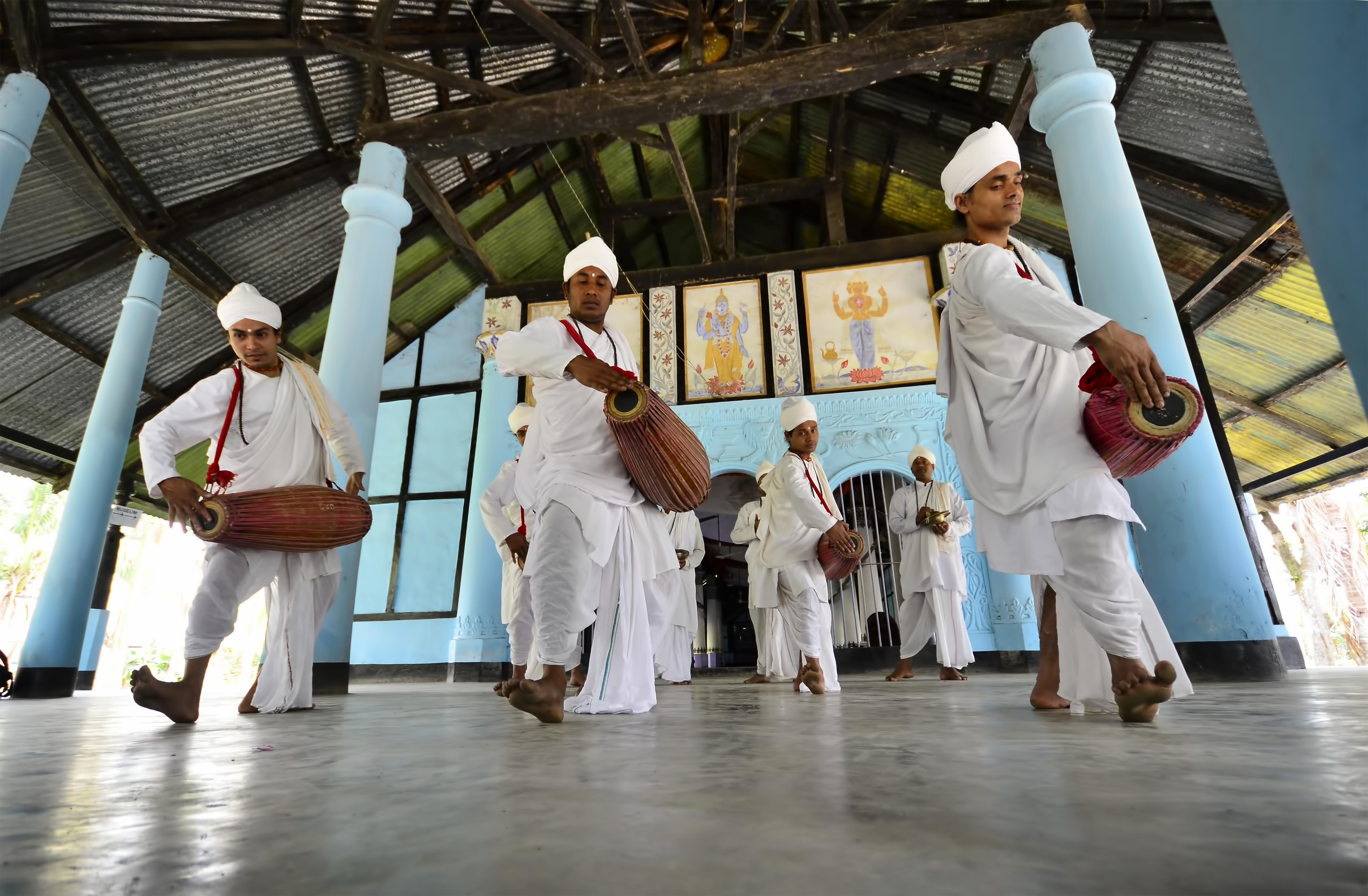
Gayan Bayan in Majuli

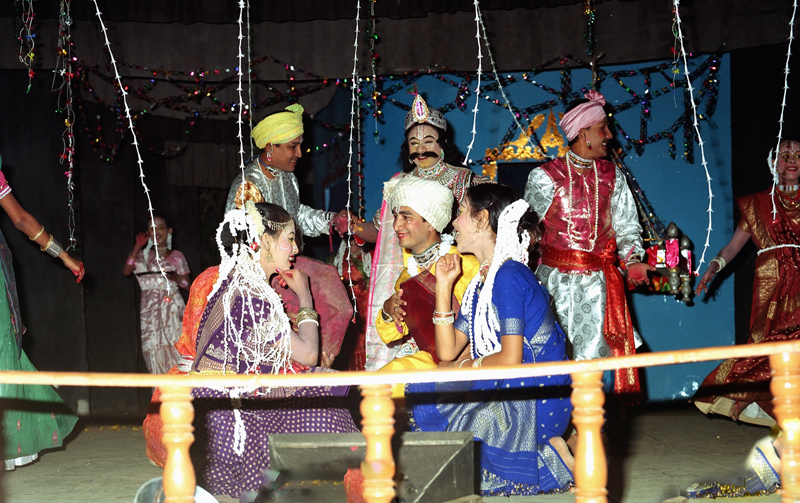
Raas leela in Majuli

The Ali Ai Ligang festival, celebrated mid-February for five days, is a grand event that starts on the second Wednesday and ends on the first Wednesday of Falgun. Local dishes such as purang apin (packed boiled rice), apong (rice beer), and various pork, fish, and chicken dishes are served. The traditional Mising dance called Gumrag Soman is performed in every village to worship Donyi Polo (Mother Sun and Father Moon) for a good harvest.

In upper Majuli, the majority of Christians from the Mising tribe celebrate Christmas, particularly in the village of Jengraimukh. For the last half millennium, Majuli has served as the cultural centre and cradle of Assamese civilization.

=== Neo-Vaishnavite satras ===
Majuli has long been the centre of Assamese neo-Vaishnavite culture, which began in the 15th century under the guidance of the Assamese saint Srimanta Sankardev and his disciple Madhavdev. Many of the satras built by Sankardev still stand, reflecting the vibrant Assamese culture. Sankardev sought refuge in Majuli, spending time in Belguri in West Majuli, where the historic Manikanchan Sanjog incident took place when he met Madhavdeva for the first time. The first satra in Majuli was established in Belguri by Sankardev, leading to the creation of a total of 65 satras. However, today, only 23 of the original 65 are still active. Out of the 665 original satras in Assam, 65 were located in Majuli.

The main surviving satras are:

- Dakhinpat Satra: Founded by Banamalidev, it is known for celebrating Raasleela, which is now recognized as one of Assam's national festivals.
- Garamur Satra: Founded by Lakshmikantadeva, Garamur Satra consists of two parts: Garamur Bor Satra and Garamur Saru Satra. Both parts celebrate Raasleela at the end of autumn and house ancient weapons known as bartop or cannons.
- Auniati Satra: Founded by Niranjan Pathakdeva, this satra is renowned for Paalnaam and Apsara dances, as well as its extensive collection of ancient Assamese artifacts, utensils, jewelry, and handicrafts. It has 125 disciples and over 700,000 global followers.
- Kamalabari Satra: Founded by Badalapadma Ata, it is a centre of art, culture, literature, and classical studies on the island. Its branch, the Uttar Kamalabari Satra, has performed cultural programs of Satria art both across the country and abroad.
- Narashingha Satra: Established in 1746 by Ahom King Promottra Singha, Alengi Narasingha Satra is a notable institution on the island.
- Benegenaati Satra: This satra is a reliquary of culturally significant antiques and an advanced centre of performing arts. It was founded by Muraridev, the grandson of Sankaradeva's stepmother. Among its notable artifacts is the royal raiment belonging to Ahom King Swargadeo Godadhar Singha, which is made of gold. The satra also preserves a royal umbrella crafted from gold.
- Shamaguri Satra: This satra is famous for mask-making in India.
- Bihimpur Satra: This satra preserves the Borgeet, Matiakhara, and Satriya dances, including various forms such as the Jumora, Chali, Notua, Nande Vringee, Sutradhar, Ozapali, Apsara, Satria Krishna, and Dasavater dances, all propagated by Sankardev. Additionally, it has become a centre for spiritual purification (shuddhi) in Northeast India, thanks to the efforts of Pitambar Deva Goswami.

=== Literature ===
Neo-Vaishnavite preacher Madhavdev met his guru, Sankardev, the founder of neo-Vaishnavism, on the island in an event termed the Manikanchan Sanjog. Madhavdev and his mentor enriched Assamese literature by writing, among other works, Nam Ghosa, Borgeet, and Bhatima. Following the footsteps of these Vaishnava leaders, the satras encouraged the writing of plays and devotional songs.

Majuli has also given birth to a host of literary figures, including well-renowned writers such as Dhruba Jyoti Borah, poet and critic Rajib Borah, bilingual critic and writer Bhaskar Jyoti Nath, Juri Borah Borgohain, Deba Bhushan Borah, historian Dambarudhar Nath, novelist Gobin Khound, and poet Danny Gam.

The second Assamese newspaper, Asom Bilasini, was published from Majuli starting in 1871.

== Ecology ==
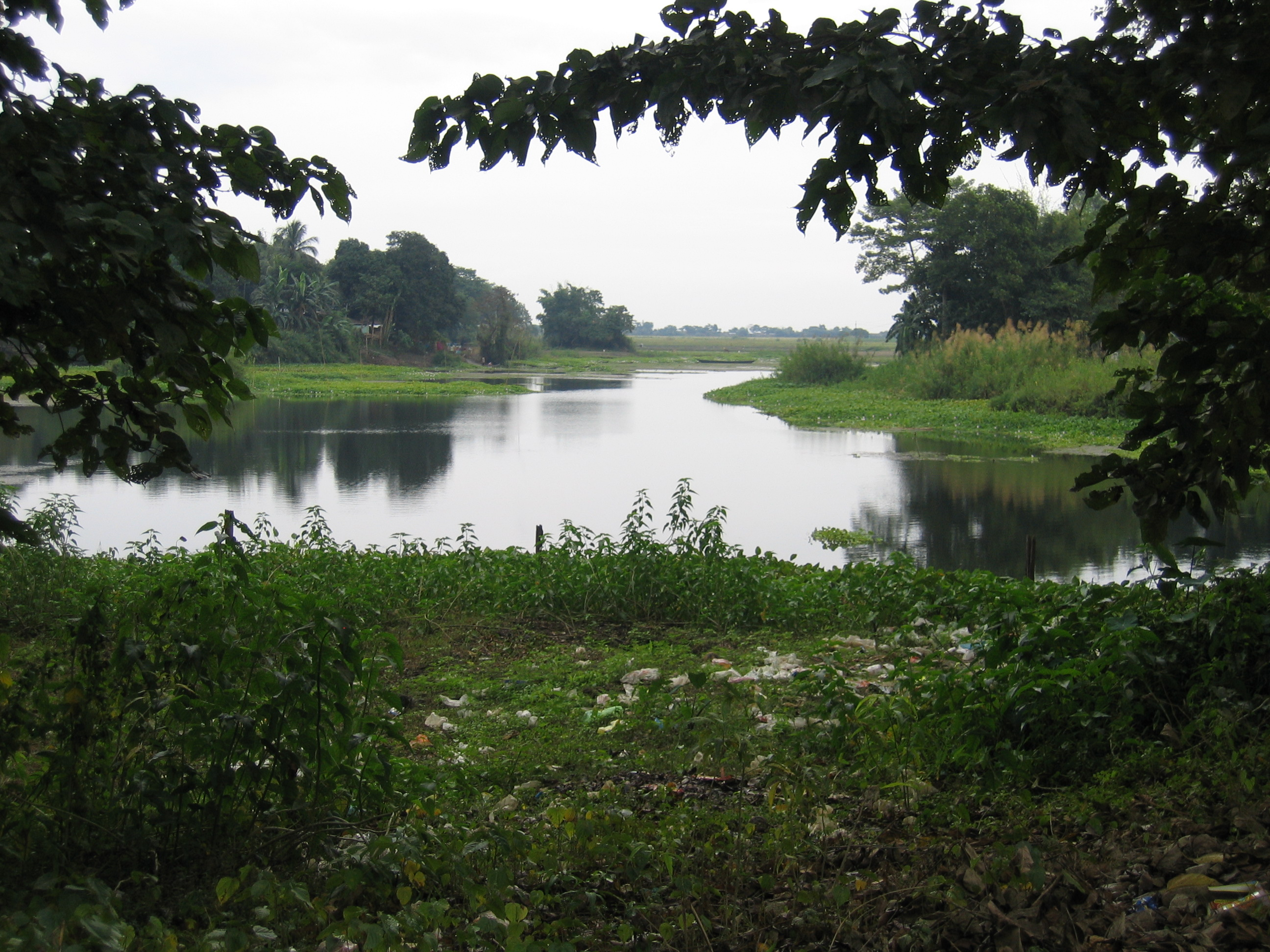
Majuli wetland

The island is shrinking due to erosion

Majuli is a wetland that serves as a habitat for various rare and endangered avian species, particularly migratory birds that visit during the winter. Species include the greater adjutant stork, pelican, Siberian crane, and whistling teal. After dark, wild geese and ducks take flight to distant destinations. The island remains relatively pollution-free due to the absence of industrial activity and consistent rainfall.

However, Majuli faces a significant threat from extensive soil erosion along its banks. Large embankments built in nearby towns upstream to prevent erosion during the monsoon season have had unintended consequences. The turbulent Brahmaputra River now erodes much of the island. Reports indicate that by 1853, Majuli's total area was 1,150 km^{2}, and roughly 33% of this landmass eroded in the latter half of the 20th century. Since 1991, more than 35 villages have been washed away, and surveys predict that Majuli may cease to exist within the next 15 to 20 years.

To save the island, the Government of India has sanctioned ₹2.50 billion (US$55 million) for its protection. The Water Resources Department and the Brahmaputra Board have been struggling for the past three decades to resolve the erosion problem but with little success. Recently, it was suggested that constructing a four-lane highway protected by a concrete mat along the southern boundary of Majuli, together with the excavation of the Brahmaputra riverbed, could help address the issue. The project also includes two floodgates for the Kherkatia Suti, a tributary of the Brahmaputra. The Brahmaputra River Restoration Project has yet to be implemented by the government. However, a nomination has been submitted to UNESCO for declaring Majuli as a World Heritage Site.

Local environmental activist Jadav Payeng has planted a 550-hectare forest known as Molai Forest to combat erosion on the island. Much of the island was once barren sandbars that were vulnerable to erosion, but thanks to Payeng's afforestation efforts, it has become a lush forest. The forest has become a habitat for various animals, including elephants, tigers, deer, and vultures.

=== Climate threat ===
The island faces threats of complete disappearance due to shrinking wetlands and climate extremes. The island also faces the threat of increased flooding, erosion, displacement, internal migration, and decreasing agricultural productivity.

== Economy ==
=== Industries ===
Agriculture is the primary industry in Majuli, with unmilled rice or paddy serving as the principal crop. The island cultivates over 100 varieties of rice, including Komal Saul, Bao Dhan, and sticky brown rice, traditionally used in Jolpan and Pitha. The economy is also supported by handloom weaving, fishing, dairy farming, pottery, and boat-making.

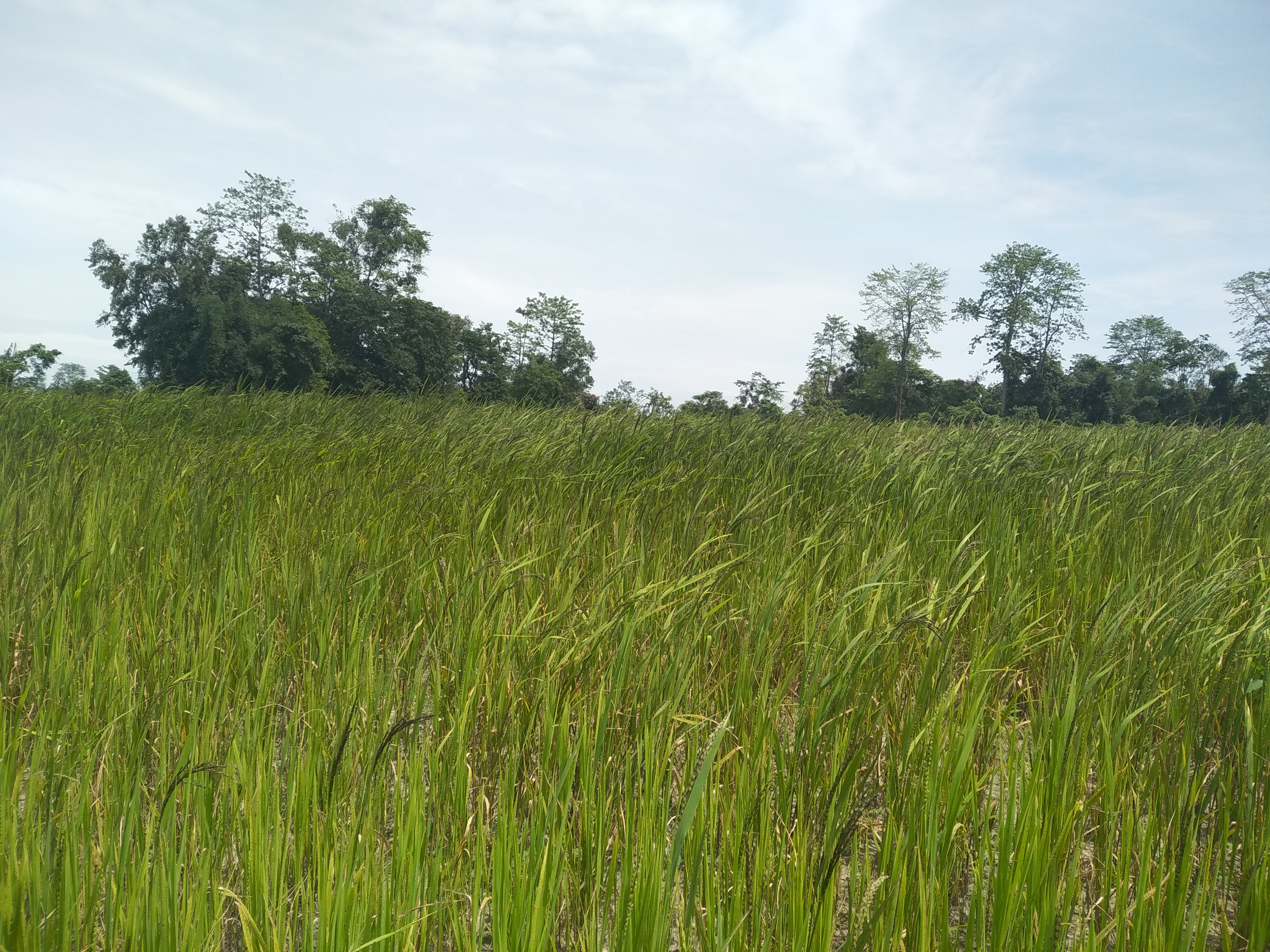
A paddy field in Jengraimukh.

=== Education sector ===
Majuli's public school system is managed by the government of Assam and administered by the Assam State School Education Board. There are several universities, colleges, and institutes offering higher secondary, undergraduate, and postgraduate programs, located on the island, including Majuli University of Culture, National Institute of Electronics & Information Technology, Majuli College, Jengraimukh College, Rangachahi College, and Pub Majuli College.

=== Tourism sector ===
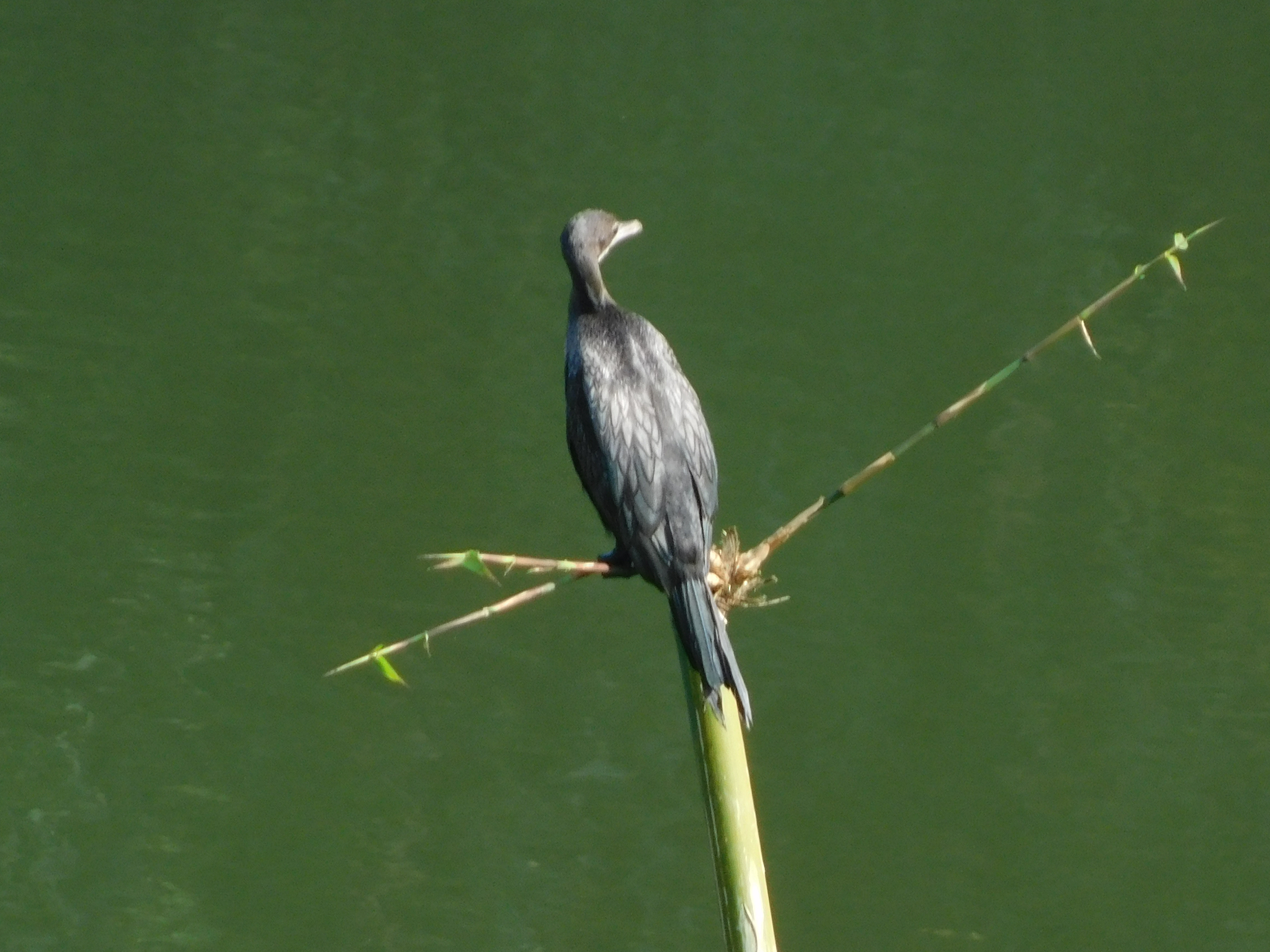
Several locations around the island are popular for birdwatching.

Majuli is situated approximately 20 kilometres (12 mi) from Jorhat. Tourists can visit the island via a combination of bus and ferry from the Nimati Steamer Ghat, with the journey taking over three hours and involving multiple transfers. Surrounding urban centres include North Lakhimpur, Golaghat, Sibsagar, and Dibrugarh district.

Points of interest in Majuli include the Vaishnava Satras and traditional crafts such as pottery, mask making, and the weaving of handmade mekhla chadars. Several festivals, like Ali Ai Ligang, Paal Namm, Folqu, and Porag, are also celebrated on the island.

The southern region of Majuli is a popular site for birdwatching, particularly from November to March, due to the favourable weather and increased avian activity. Other notable birdwatching areas include Sakuli Beel, Verki Beel, and Magurmari Beel.

=== Transport ===
Majuli Port is served by a roll-on/roll-off (RORO) ferry service operated by the Inland Waterways Authority of India on National Waterway 2. The service employs two low-draft vessels, each capable of carrying approximately 200 passengers, four cars, and two trucks. In addition to water-based transport, a two-lane bridge is under construction to provide a direct road connection between Majuli and Jorhat. Work on the bridge commenced on 18 February 2021, and it is designed to link Neematighat with Kamalabari.

== Gallery ==
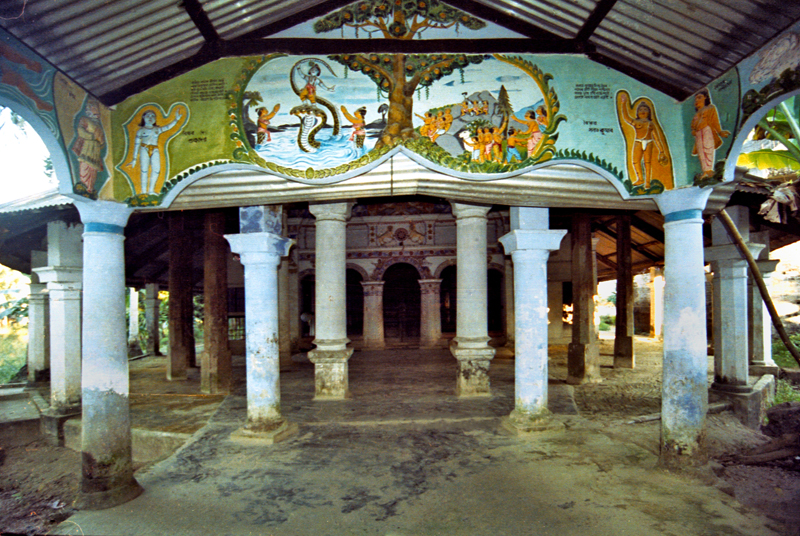
Kamalabari Satra

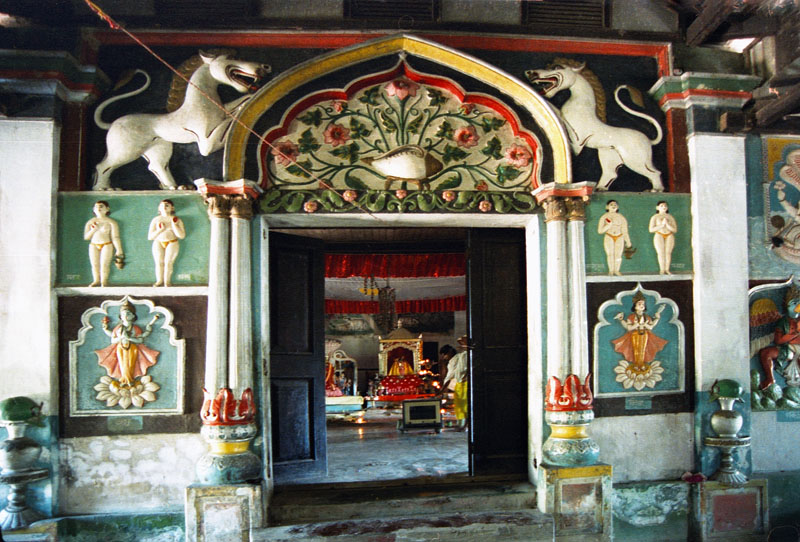
Dakhinpat Satra

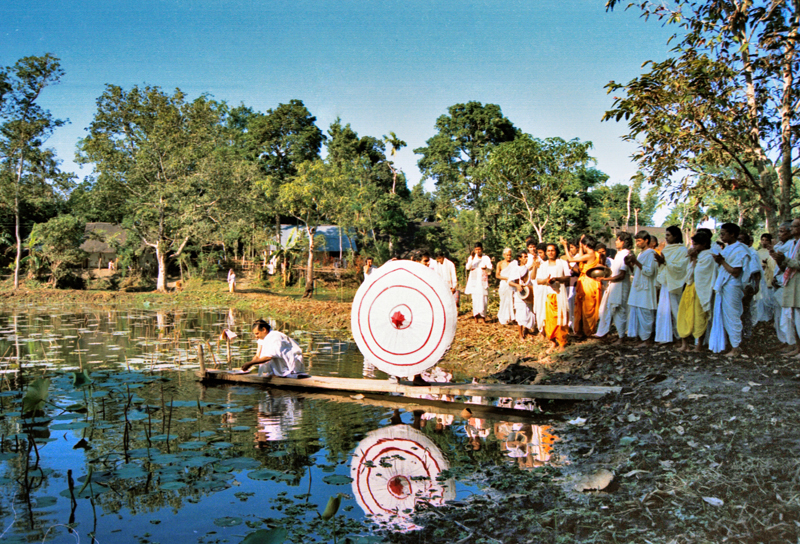
Puja at Dakhinpat Satra

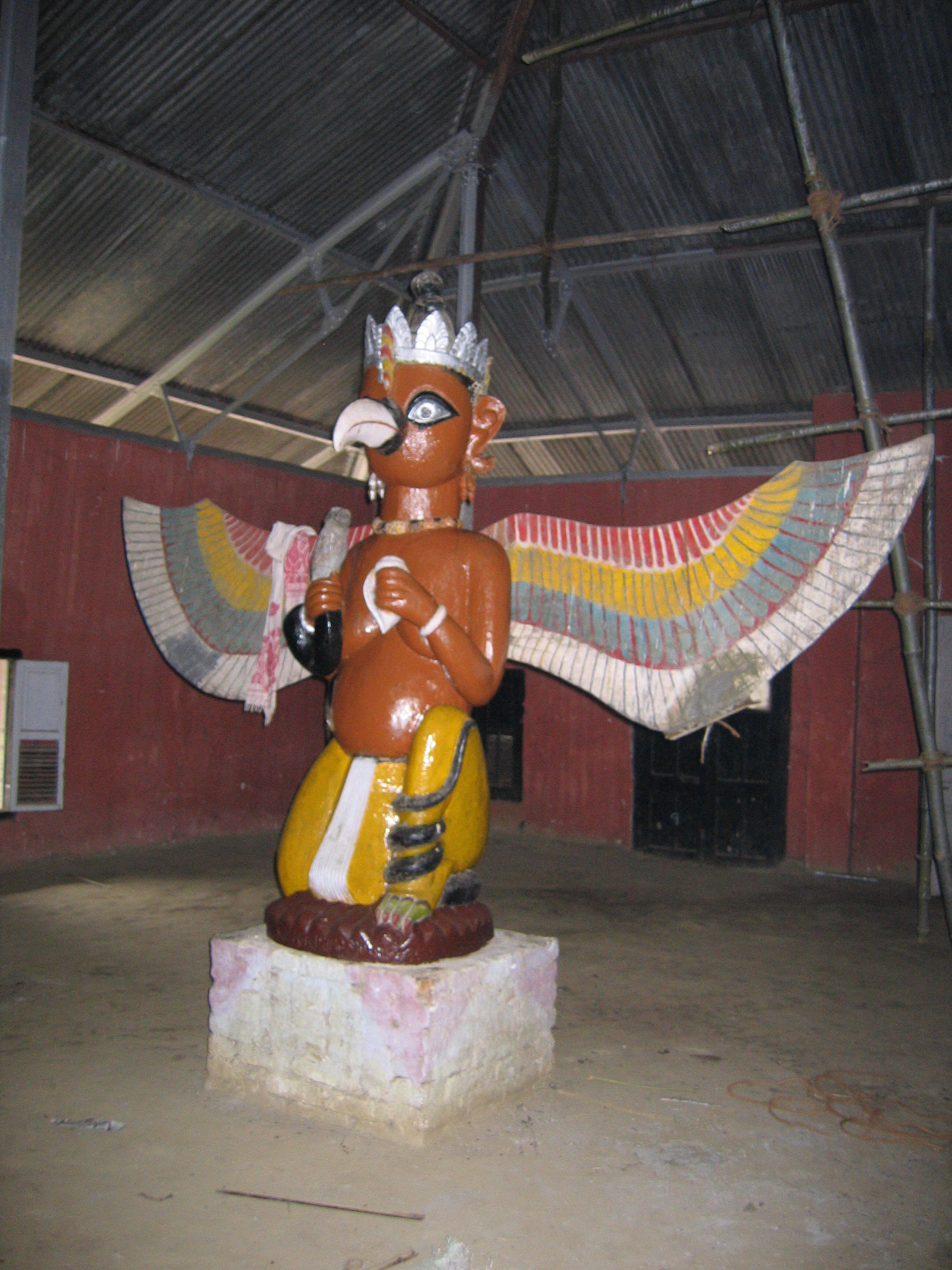
Garuda statue in Auniati Satra

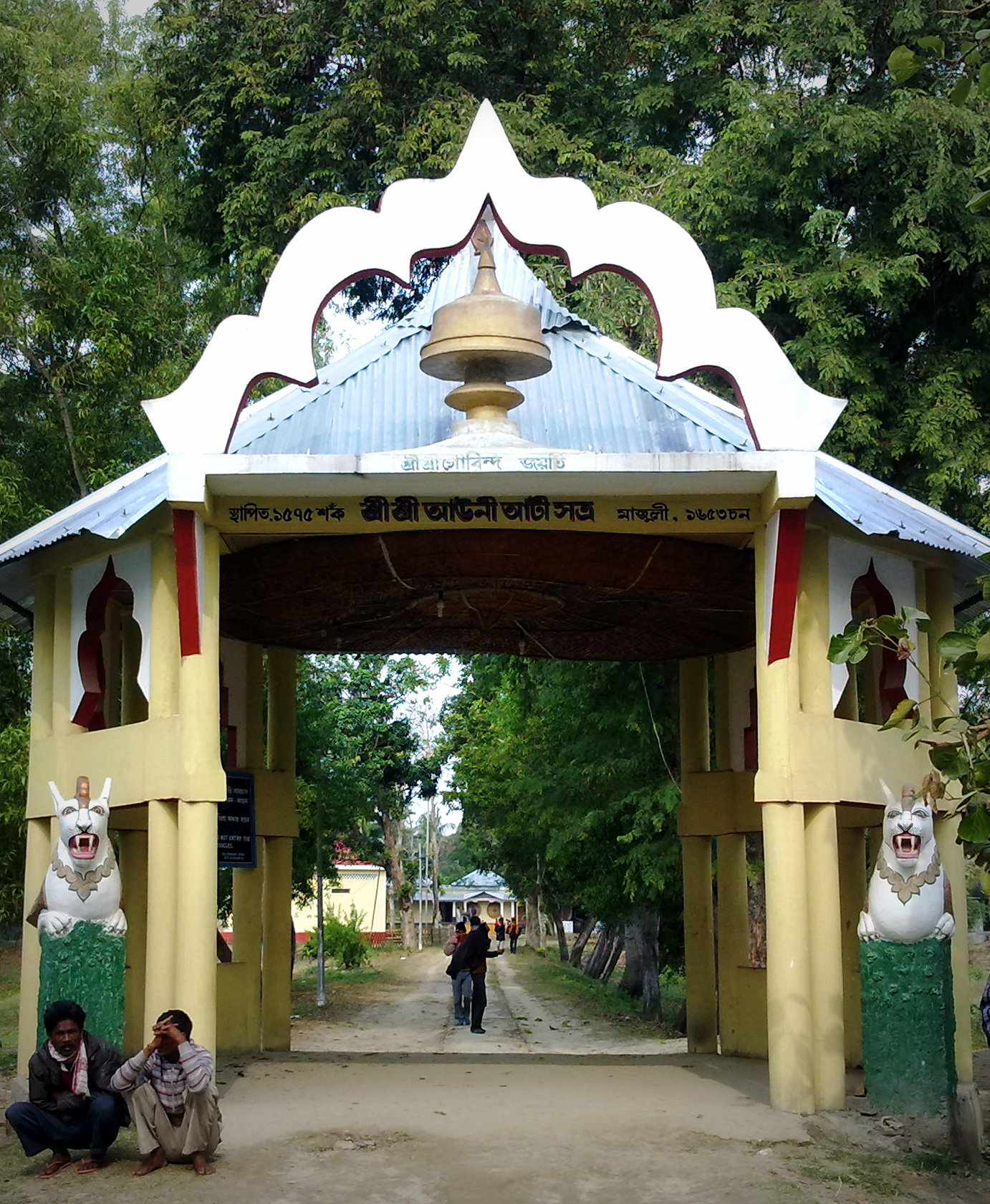
Auniati Satra gate

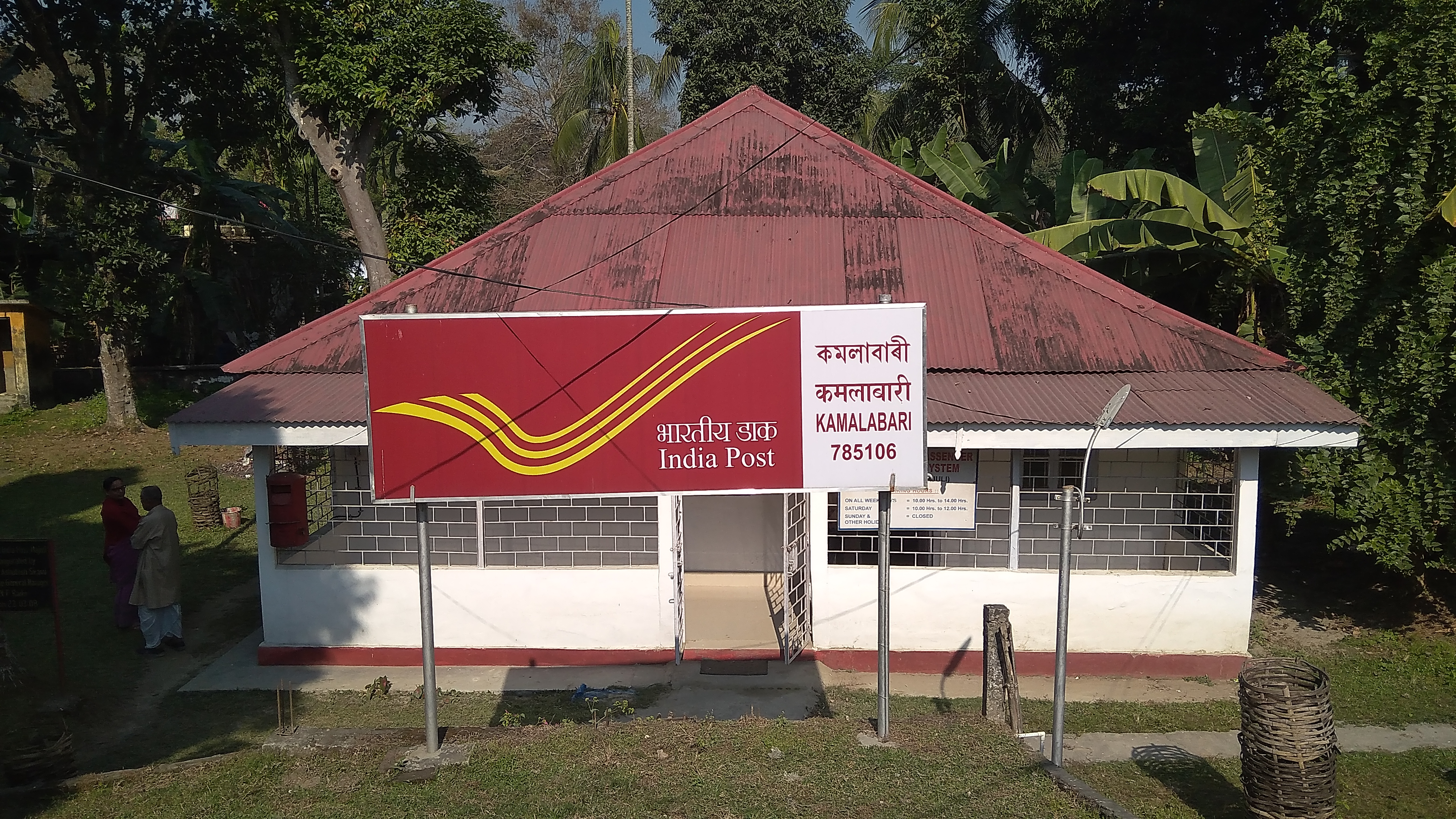
Kamalabari Post Office

== See also ==
- Majuli Assembly constituency
- Hindu pilgrimage sites
- National Geological Monuments of India
- Tourism in Assam
- Yatra
