= Majuli district =

- District of Assam
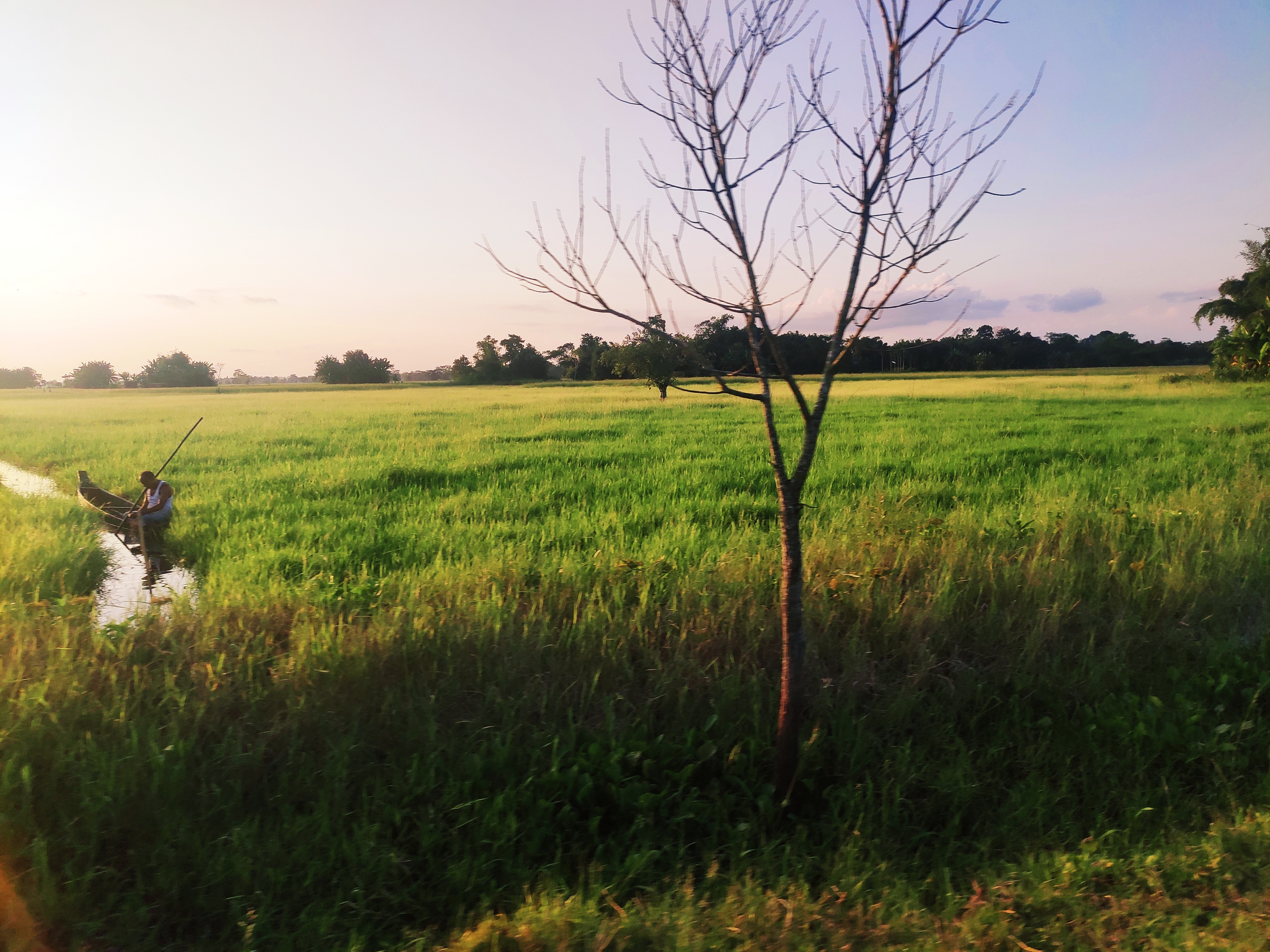
- Wetland in Majuli

- Location in Assam
- Coordinates: 26°57′0″N 94°10′0″E
- Country: India
- State: Assam
- Division: Upper Assam
- Headquarters: Garamur

Government
  - Lok Sabha constituencies: Lakhimpur
  - Vidhan Sabha constituencies: Majuli

Area
  - Total: 880 km^{2} (340 sq mi)

Population
  - Total: 167,304
  - Density: 190/km^{2} (490/sq mi)
- Time zone: UTC+05:30 (IST)
- Vehicle registration: AS-29
- Website: https://majuli.assam.gov.in/

Majuli district is situated on Majuli, the largest river island in the world, in the Brahmaputra River in Northeastern Assam. It is the first river island district of the country.

On September 8, 2016, an additional district was announced by Sarbananda Sonowal, taking the total number from 32 to 33 after Majuli was carved out of the Northern parts of Jorhat.

Garamur, a small village in the island is the headquarters of the district.

Mājuli is the abode of the Assamese neo-Vaishnavite culture. Majuli is famous throughout Assam for its large number of Satras. The four major royal Satras (monastic centers) of Majuli, recognized for their historical significance and royal patronage by the Ahom kings, are Auniati Satra, Dakhinpat Satra, Garamur Satra, and Kuruwabahi Satra, with Auniati being considered the highest, known for Paal Naam and Apsara dances, while Garamur is famed for antiques, Dakhinpat for performing arts, and Samaguri (often mentioned) for its unique mask-making. The island has numerous other satras too, viz., Sri Sri Uttar Kamalabari Satra; Sri Sri Bengena Ati Satra; Sri Sri Samaguri Satra; Sri Sri Bhogpur Satra, etc.

== Administration ==
The district consists of one circle, Majuli. The Deputy Commissioner is Mrs Karabi Sarma, ACS.

== Economy ==
The main industry is agriculture, with paddy being the chief crop. Majuli has a rich and diverse agricultural tradition, with as many as 100 varieties of rice grown, all without pesticides or artificial fertilisers.

Multiple species of rice are produced. Among these are the Komal Saul, a type that is prepared by immersing the grains in warm water for 15 minutes and usually eaten as a breakfast cereal; the bao dhan, that grows under water and is harvested after ten months and the Bora saul, a sticky brown rice used to make the traditional cake known as pitha.

Fishing, dairying, pottery, handloom and boat-making are other important economic activities.

Handloom is a major occupation among the distaff population of the villages. Although largely a non-commercial occupation, it keeps many of the inhabitants occupied. Weaving is exquisite and intricate with the use of a variety of colours and textures of cotton and silk, especially Muga silk.

== Demographics ==
As of the 2011 census, Majuli district has a population of 1,67,304, entirely rural. Majuli has a sex ratio of 955 females per 1000 males. Scheduled Castes and Scheduled Tribes make up 23,878 (14.27%) and 77,603 (46.38%) of the population. Hinduism is the predominant religion, practiced by 99.04% of the population.

Languages of Majuli district (2011)
1. Assamese 54.47 (53.7%)
2. Mising 41.01 (40.5%)
3. Bengali 1.66 (1.64%)
4. Deori 1.22 (1.20%)
5. Hindi 0.9 (0.89%)
6. Nepali 0.46 (0.45%)
7. Others 1.64 (1.62%)

At the time of the 2011 census, 54.47% of the population spoke Assamese, 41.01% Mising, 1.66% Bengali and 1.22% Deori as their first language.

== Politics ==
Majuli (Vidhan Sabha constituency) falls under the 99 constituency of the legislative assembly of Assam. It is a reserved seat for the Scheduled Tribes (ST). The current MLA from Majuli is Bhuban Gam of the Bharatiya Janata Party.

Majuli is one of the 10 assembly segments of Jorhat (Lok Sabha constituency). At present, Gaurav Gogoi is the Member of Parliament from the Indian National Congress. He is also currently appointed as the Deputy Leader of Indian National Congress in Lok Sabha.

It is under jurisdiction of Mising Autonomous Council having three constituencies.

== See also ==
- Jadav Payeng
- Tourism in Assam
- List of villages in Majuli
