= Indian classical dance =

Performance arts rooted in Hindu musical theatre

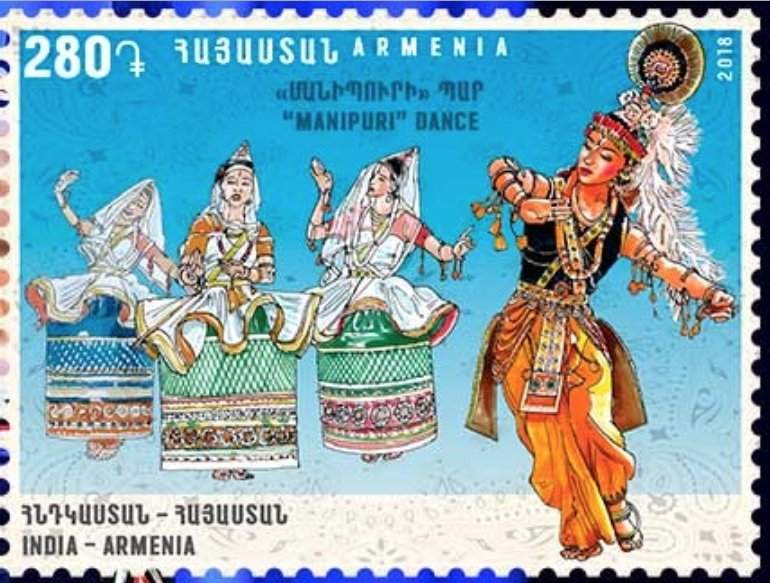
An illustration of the Manipuri Raas Leela Dance (Meitei: Jagoi Raas, Raas Jagoi), one of the officially recognised classical dance forms of India, depicted on a postage stamp from Armenia.

Indian classical dance, or Shastriya Nritya, is an umbrella term for different regionally specific Indian classical dance traditions, rooted in predominantly Hindu musical theatre performance, the theory and practice of which can be traced to the Sanskrit text Natya Shastra. The number of Indian classical dance styles ranges from six to eight to twelve, or more, depending on the source and scholar; the main organisation for Indian arts preservation, the Sangeet Natak Academy recognizes eight: Bharatanatyam, Kathak, Kuchipudi, Odissi, Kathakali, Sattriya, Manipuri and Mohiniyattam. Additionally, the Indian Ministry of Culture includes Chhau and Gaudiya Nritya in its list, recognising ten total styles. Scholars such as Drid Williams add Chhau, Yakshagana and Bhagavata Mela to the list. The ancient Meitei dance forms of Lai Haraoba and the Khamba Thoibi from Manipur, are also considered as "classical", in par with their Vaishnav equivalent (Manipuri Raas Leela), with the strong characteristics of abhinaya (histrionic representation). Each dance tradition originates and comes from a different state and/or region of India; for example, Bharatanatyam is from Tamil Nadu in the south of India, Odissi is from the east coast state of Odisha, and Manipuri is from the northeastern state of Manipur. The music associated with these different dance performances consists many compositions in Hindi, Malayalam, Meitei (Manipuri), Sanskrit, Tamil, Odia, Telugu, Assamese, and many other Indian-Subcontinent languages; they represent a unity of core ideas and a diversity of styles, costumes, and expression.

== Summary ==
Indian classical dancing started around 200 BCE in India, as a joyful and celebratory activity, often in devotion to Hindu deities. Many of the performances are choreographed to retell stories of the gods and other historical accounts. All styles of Indian classical dance are vibrant, expressive, and spiritual. Dance performances usually take place at festivals, universities, various cultural events, and more. The dancers who perform these styles are usually professionals who have devoted years of study and practice in their respective style of Indian classical dance. In performances, the dancers move to the beat of the song or music that is playing; in some styles, such as Kathak, bells are worn around the ankles at times for added rhythmic effect when the feet are stomped. The dancer takes the role of the character that they are portraying in the performance, the composition being specific, and become emotionally connected with the story and the audience.

When dancers perform classical Indian dancing, they wear traditional clothes including sarees, lehengas, and kurtas. Usually, women are the main performers in Indian classical dancing, though men are not absent from the tradition. The costume for women usually consists of a long, colorful, handmade gown (worn without shoes), with an intricately embroidered pattern(s) and beading on it. For accessories, there is the use of much ornate jewelry, such as necklaces, rings, earrings, nose-rings, bracelets and anklets, sometimes with bells attached which ring each time the dancer stomps their foot in rhythm, these are ankle bells or ghungroos. The costume also includes a head-piece or some form of scarf, depending on the style. The women usually wear considerable amounts of facial makeup, not only to be noticeable from the audience, but to fully embody their character.

== Types of classical dances ==
The Natya Shastra is the foundational treatise for classical dances of India, and this text is attributed to the ancient scholar Bharata Muni. Its first complete compilation is dated to between 200 BCE and 200 CE, but estimates vary between 500 BCE and 500 CE. The most studied version of the Natya Shastra text consists of about 6000 verses structured into 36 chapters. The text, states Natalia Lidova, describes the theory of Tāṇḍava dance (Shiva), the theory of rasa, of bhāva, expression, gestures, acting techniques, basic steps, standing postures – all of which are part of Indian classical dances. Dance and performance arts, states this ancient text, are a form of expression of spiritual ideas, virtues, and the essence of scriptures.

Performance arts and culture

Let Nātya (drama and dance) be the fifth vedic scripture.
Combined with an epic story,
tending to virtue, wealth, joy and spiritual freedom,
it must contain the significance of every scripture,
and forward every art.

— Nātyaśāstra 1.14–15

While the Natya Shastra is the revered ancient text in the Hindu tradition, there are numerous other ancient and medieval Sanskrit dance-drama related texts that further discuss and expand on the classical repertoire of performance arts, such as the Abhinaya Darpana, Abhinava Bharati, Natya Darpana, Bhava Prakasa and many others. The term "classical" (Sanskrit: "Shastriya") denotes the ancient Indian Shastra-based performing arts.

The text Natya Shastra describes religious arts as a form as margi, or a "spiritual traditional path" that liberates the soul, while the folk entertainment is called desi, or a "regional popular practice".

Indian classical dances are traditionally performed as an expressive drama-dance form of religious performance art, related to Vaishnavism, Shaivism, Shaktism, pan-Hindu Epics and the Vedic literature, or a folksy entertainment that includes story-telling from Sanskrit or regional language plays. As a religious art, they are either performed inside the sanctum of a Hindu temple, or near it. Folksy entertainment may also be performed in temple grounds or any fairground, typically in a rural setting by traveling troupes of artists; alternatively, they have been performed inside the halls of royal courts or public squares during festivals.

However, this is not the case for Kathak, Manipuri and Chhau as it has their own uniqueness. Kathak can be also performed on courtyards of mosques and had Muslim elements while Manipuri had the huyen langlon genre which focuses on combat. Like Manipuri, Chhau also had elements on combat.

== Dance forms ==
The Natya Shastra mentions four Pravrittis (traditions, genres) of ancient dance-drama in vogue when it was composed – Avanti (Ujjain, central), Dakshinatya (south), Panchali (north, west) and Odra-Magadhi (east).

Sources differ in their list of Indian classical dance forms. Encyclopædia Britannica mentions six dances. The Sangeet Natak Akademi has given recognition to eight Indian dances. The Indian government's Ministry of Culture includes nine dance forms. Scholars such as Drid Williams and others include Yakshagana and Bhagavata Mela to the list of classical Indian dances. Dance forms of the Lai Haraoba and the Khamba Thoibi are also considered as "classical".

The classical dance forms recognised by the Sangeet Natak Akademi and the Ministry of Culture are:

=== Eight classical dances recognised by the Sangeet Natak Academy and the Ministry of Culture ===
- Bharatanatyam, from Tamil Nadu
- Kathak, from Uttar Pradesh
- Kathakali, from Kerala
- Kuchipudi, from Andhra Pradesh and Telangana
- Manipuri, from Manipur
- Mohiniyattam, from Kerala (Note: Encyclopædia Britannica excludes Mohiniyattam from the list of the Indian classical dances.)
- Odissi, from Odisha
- Sattriya, from Assam (Note: Encyclopædia Britannica excludes Sattriya from the list of the Indian classical dances.)

=== Images ===
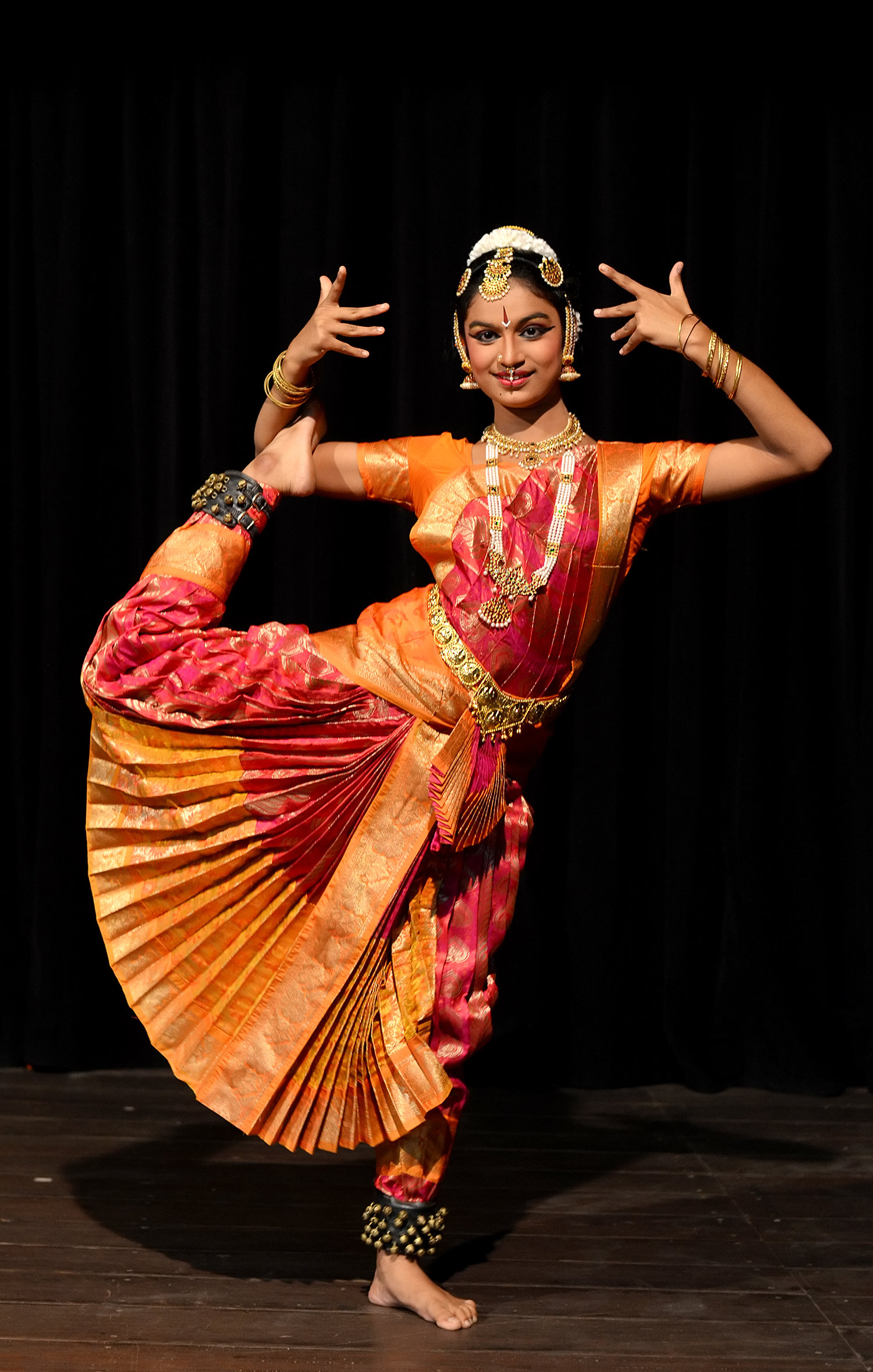
Bharatanatyam

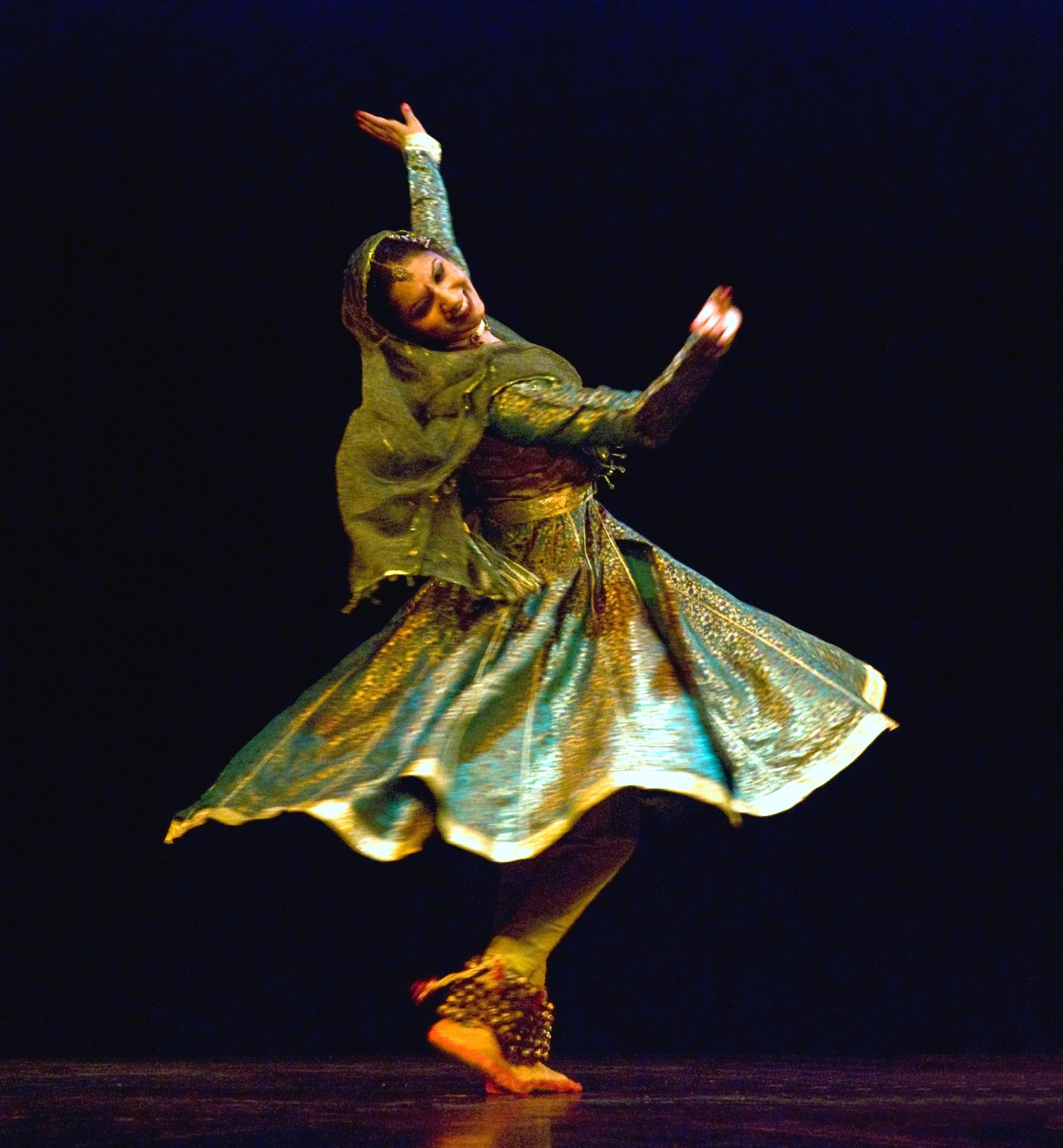
Kathak

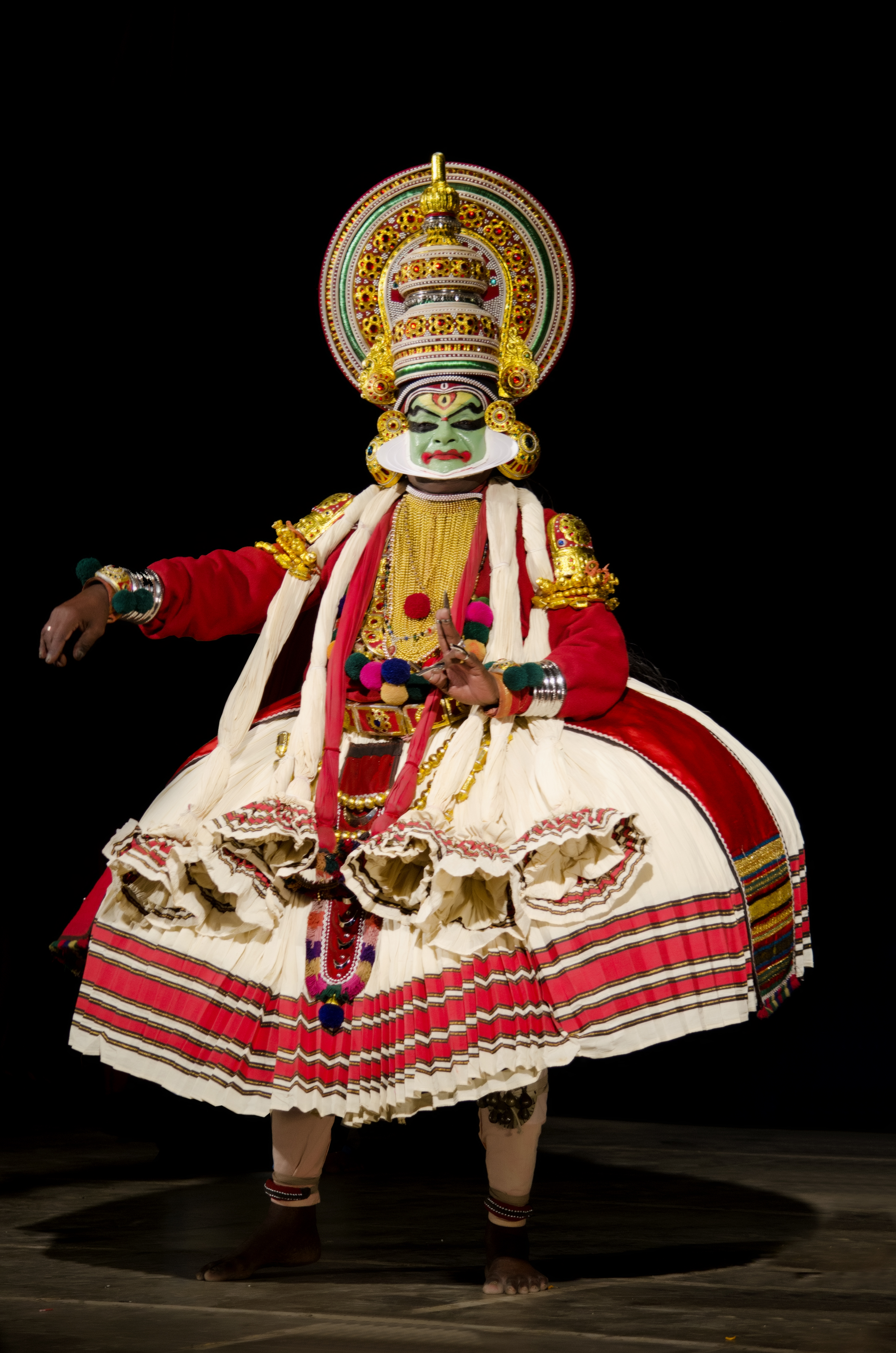
Kathakali

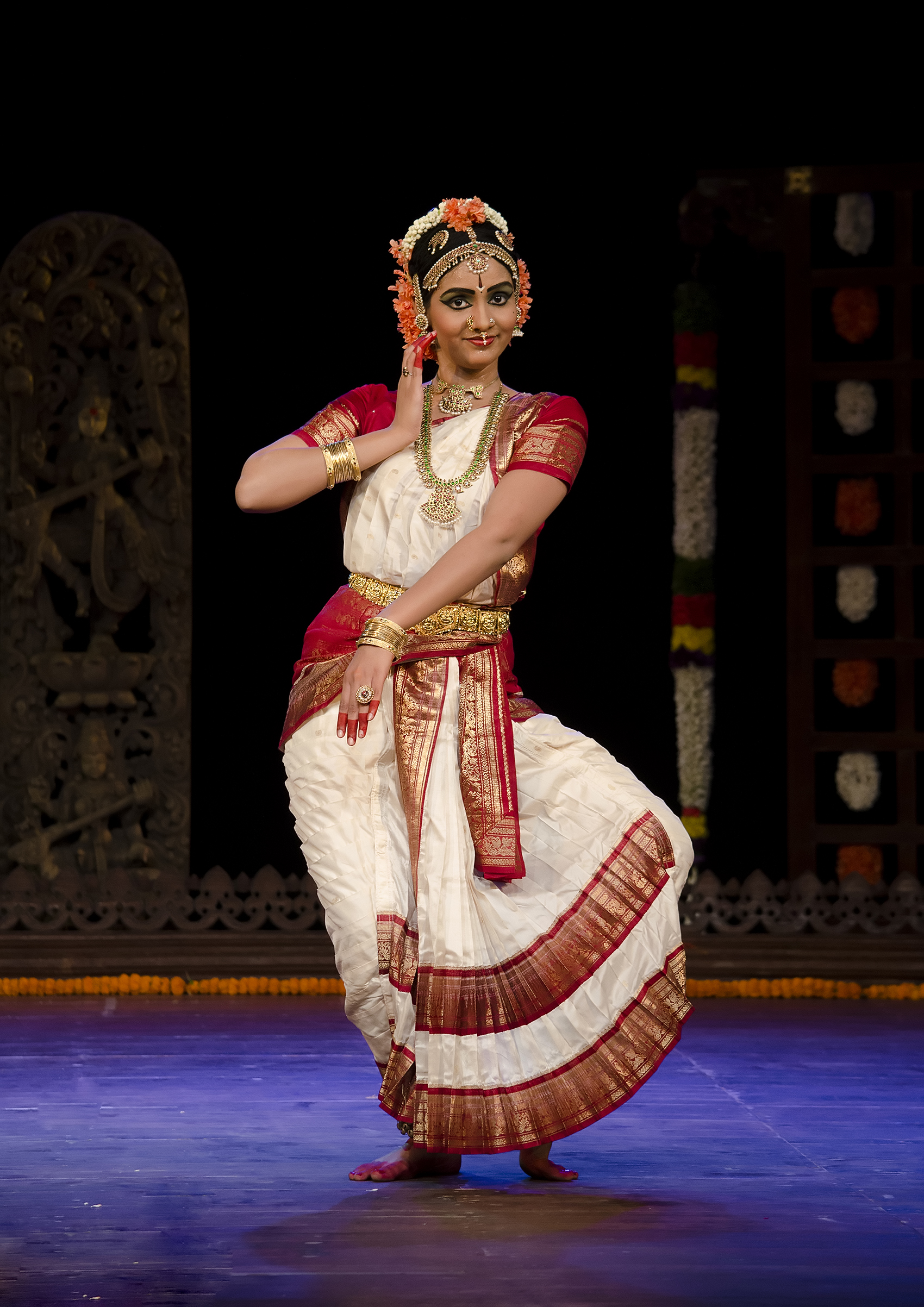
Kuchipudi

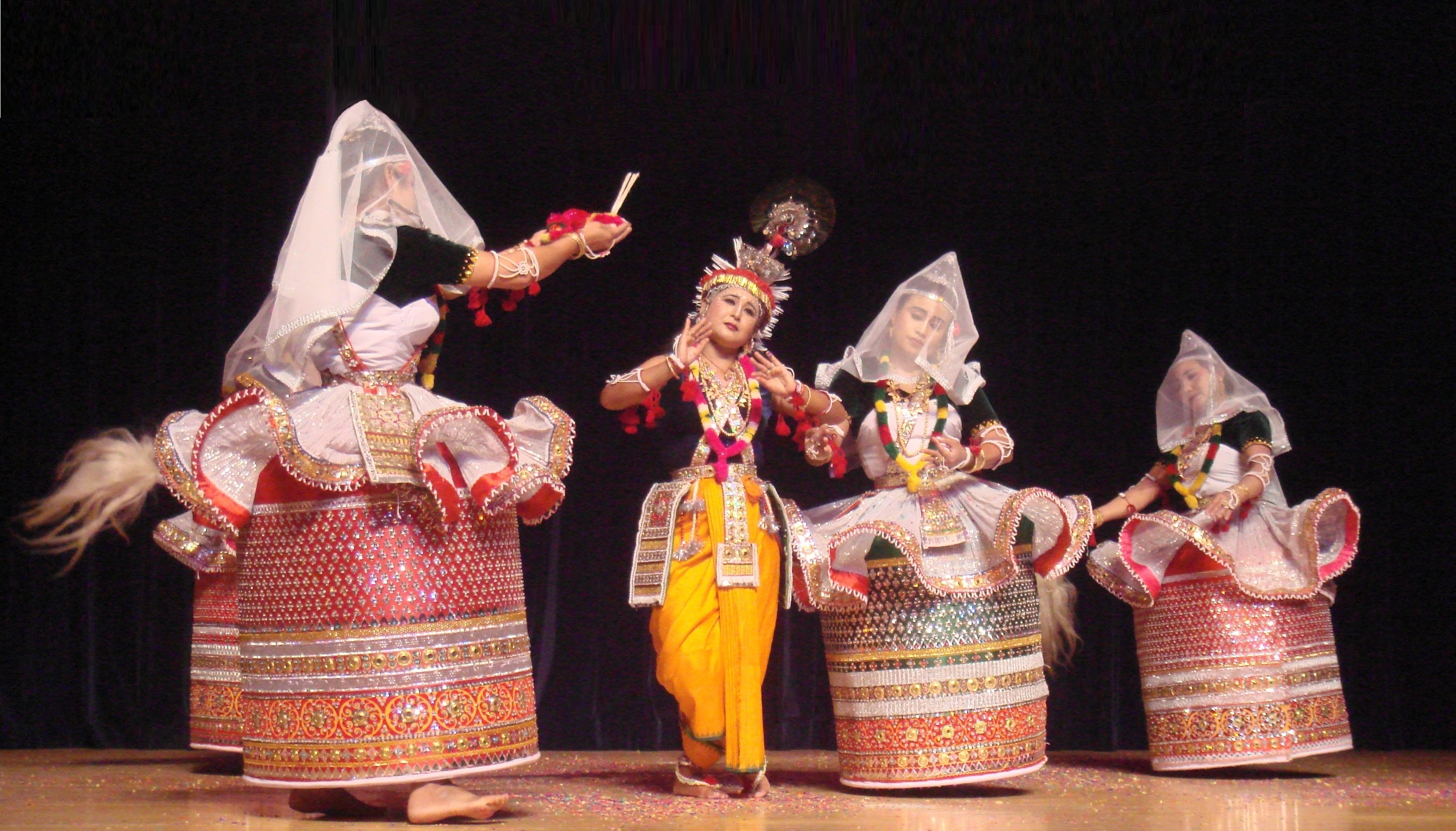
Manipuri

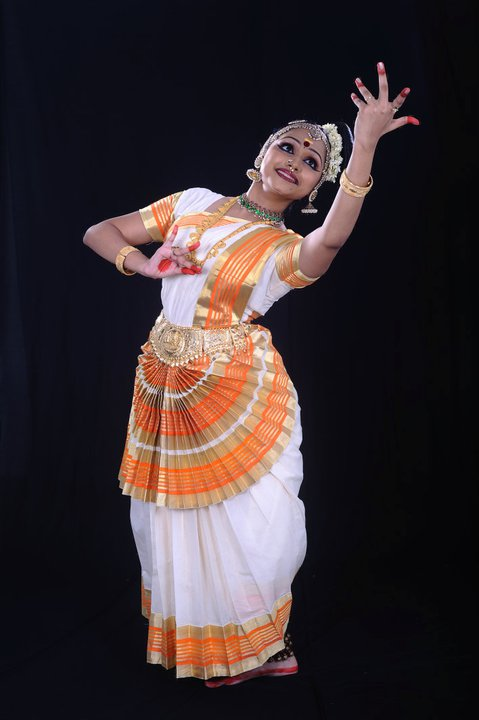
Mohiniyattam

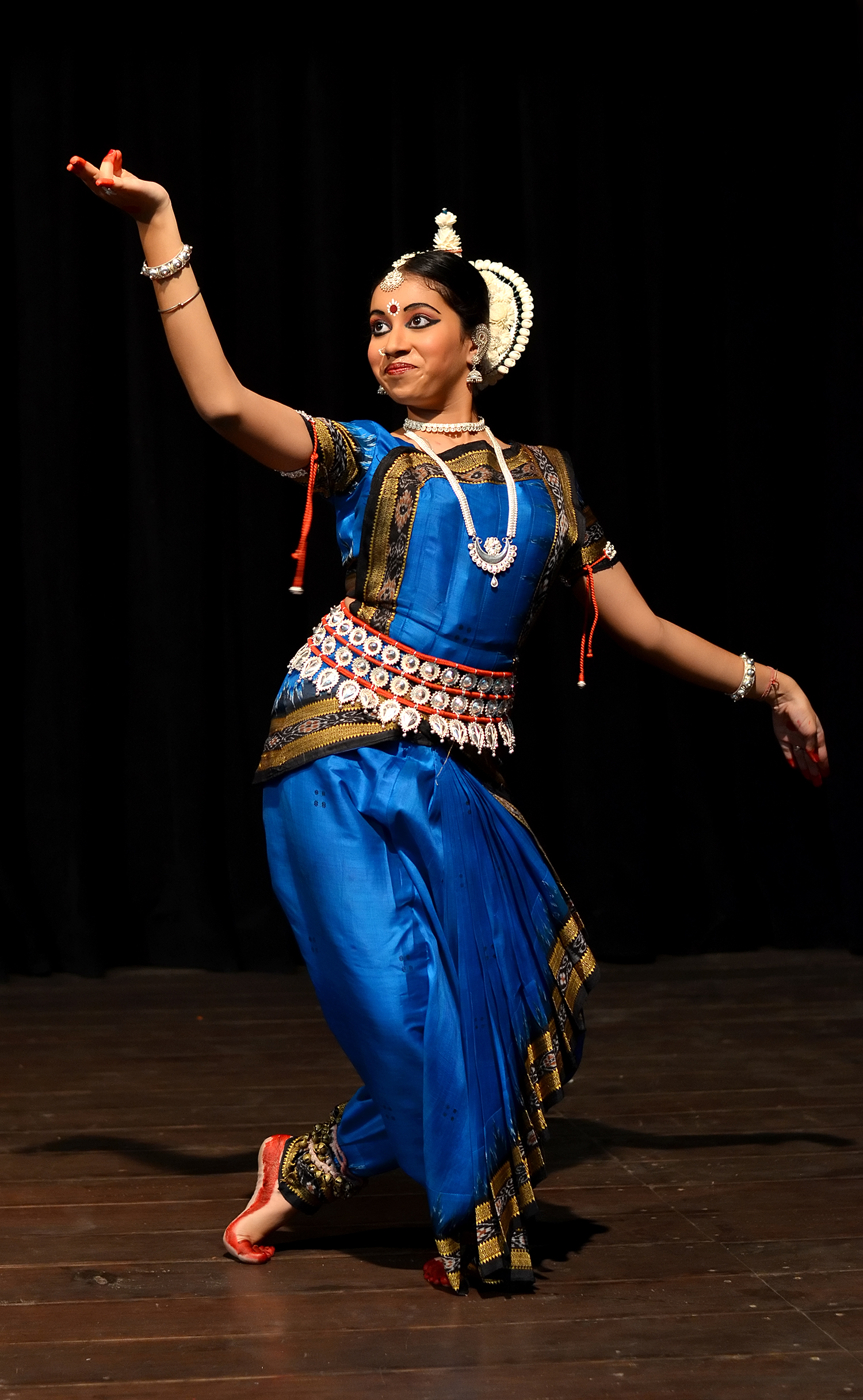
Odissi

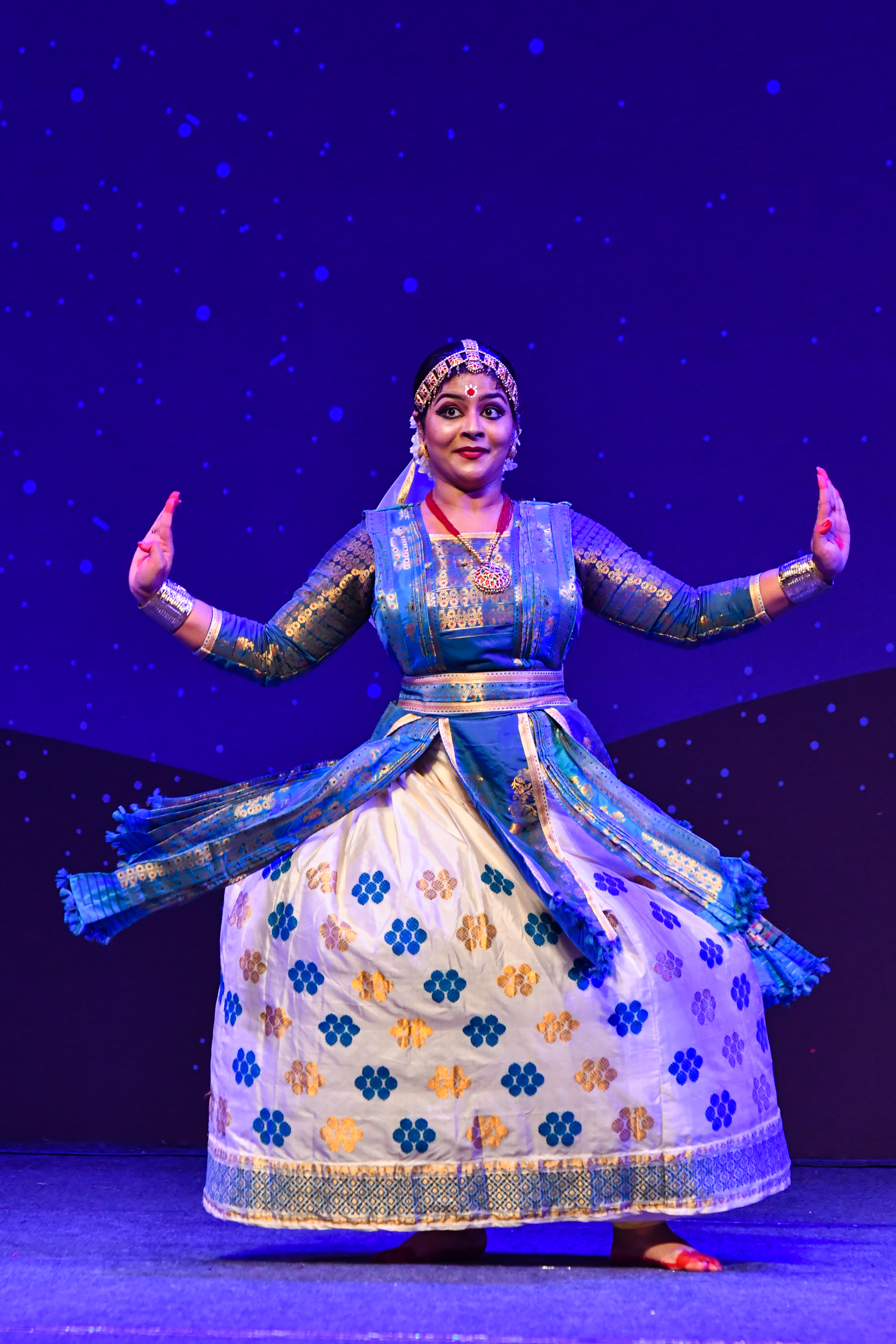
Sattriya

Some famous Indian classical dancers are :

- Bharatanatyam - Rukmini Devi, Padma Subrahmanyam, Vyjayanthimala, Sheema Kermani, Padmini, Pt. Smt. Swati Daithankar (who was awarded the 'Nritya Alankar' by Akhil Bharatiya Gandharva Mahavidyalaya Mandal)
- Kathak - Birju Maharaj, Nahid Siddiqui, Lacchu Maharaj, Gopi Krishna, Saswati Sen, Manjari Chaturvedi
- Kathakali - Kalamandalam Krishnan Nair, Guru Kunchu Kurup, Ramankutty Nair, Guru Gopinath
- Kuchipudi - Mallika Sarabhai, V. Satyanarayana Sarma, Deepa Shashindran,
- Manipuri - Guru Bipin Singh, Darshana Jhaveri, Jhaveri Sisters, Devjani Chaliha, Amala Shankar
- Mohiniyattam - Kalamandalam Kalyanikutty Amma, Shobhana, Sunanda Nair, Kalamandalam Radhika, Thankamani, Kalamandalam Hymavathy
- Odissi - Sujata Mohapatra, Madhavi Mudgal, Kelucharan Mohapatra, Surendra Nath Jena, Shobana Sahajananan, Minati Mishra
- Sattriya - Jatin Goswami, Indira P. P. Bora, Ghanakanta Bora, Sarodi Saikia, Pushpa Bhuyan,

== Shared aspects ==
All major classical Indian dance forms include in repertoire, three categories of performance in the Natya Shastra. These are Nritta, Nritya and Natya:

- The Nritta performance is an abstract, fast and rhythmic aspect of the dance. The viewer is presented with pure movement, wherein the emphasis is the beauty in motion, form, speed, range and pattern. This part of the repertoire has no interpretative aspect, no telling of the story. It is a technical performance, and aims to engage the senses (Prakriti) of the audience.
- The Nritya is slower and expressive aspect of the dance that attempts to communicate feelings, storyline particularly with spiritual themes in Hindu dance traditions. In a Nritya, the dance-acting expands to include silent expression of words through gestures and body motion set to musical notes. The actor articulates a legend or a spiritual message. This part of the repertoire is more than sensory enjoyment, it aims to engage the emotions and mind of the viewer.
- The Natya is a play, typically a team performance, but can be acted out by a solo performer where the dancer uses certain standardized body movements to indicate a new character in the underlying story. A Natya incorporates the elements of a Nritya.

All classical dances of India used similar symbolism and rules of gestures in abhinaya (acting). The roots of abhinaya are found in the Natyashastra text which defines drama in verse 6.10 as that which aesthetically arouses joy in the spectator, through the medium of actor's art of communication, that helps connect and transport the individual into a super sensual inner state of being. A performance art, asserts Natyashastra, connects the artists and the audience through abhinaya (literally, "carrying to the spectators"), that is applying body-speech-mind and scene, wherein the actors communicate to the audience, through song and music. Drama in this ancient Sanskrit text, this is an art to engage every aspect of life, to glorify and gift a state of joyful consciousness.

The communication through symbols is in the form of expressive gestures (mudras or hastas) and pantomime set to music. The gestures and facial expressions convey the ras (sentiment, emotional taste) and bhava (mood) of the underlying story. In Hindu classical dances, the artist successfully expresses the spiritual ideas by paying attention to four aspects of a performance:

- Angika (gestures and body language),
- Vachika (song, recitation, music and rhythm),
- Aharya (stage setting, costume, make up, jewelry),
- Sattvika (artist's mental disposition and emotional connection with the story and audience, wherein the artist's inner and outer state resonates).
- Abhinaya draws out the bhava (mood, psychological states).

== See also ==
- Culture of India
- Hindu texts
- Languages of India
- Puranas
- Vedas
- Yajna

== Bibliography ==
- Ambrose, Kay (1984). Classical Dances and Love of India. Palgrave Macmillan.
- Ragini Devi (1990). Dance Dialects of India. Motilal Banarsidass. ISBN 978-81-208-0674-0.
- Natalia Lidova (2014). "Natyashastra". Oxford University Press. doi:10.1093/obo/9780195399318-0071.
- Natalia Lidova (1994). Drama and Ritual of Early Hinduism. Motilal Banarsidass. ISBN 978-81-208-1234-5.
- Williams, Drid (2004). "In the Shadow of Hollywood Orientalism: Authentic East Indian Dancing" (PDF). Visual Anthropology. 17 (1). Routledge: 69–98. doi:10.1080/08949460490274013. S2CID 29065670. Archived from the original (PDF) on 4 March 2016.
- Tarla Mehta (1995). Sanskrit Play Production in Ancient India. Motilal Banarsidass. ISBN 978-81-208-1057-0.
- Reginald Massey (2004). India's Dances: Their History, Technique, and Repertoire. Abhinav Publications. ISBN 978-81-7017-434-9.
- Emmie Te Nijenhuis (1974). Indian Music: History and Structure. BRILL Academic. ISBN 90-04-03978-3.
- Kapila Vatsyayan (2001). Bharata, the Nāṭyaśāstra. Sahitya Akademi. ISBN 978-81-260-1220-6.
- Kapila Vatsyayan (1977). Classical Indian dance in literature and the arts. Sangeet Natak Akademi. OCLC 233639306., Table of Contents
- Kapila Vatsyayan (1974). Indian classical dance. Sangeet Natak Akademi. OCLC 2238067.
- Kapila Vatsyayan (2008). Aesthetic theories and forms in Indian tradition. Munshiram Manoharlal. ISBN 978-8187586357. OCLC 286469807.
- Kapila Vatsyayan. Dance In Indian Painting. Abhinav Publications. ISBN 978-81-7017-153-9.
- Wallace Dace (1963). "The Concept of "Rasa" in Sanskrit Dramatic Theory". Educational Theatre Journal. 15 (3): 249–254. doi:10.2307/3204783. JSTOR 3204783.
- Farley P. Richmond; Darius L. Swann; Phillip B. Zarrilli (1993). Indian Theatre: Traditions of Performance. Motilal Banarsidass. ISBN 978-81-208-0981-9.
- Revealing the Art of Natyasastra by Narayanan Chittoor Namboodiripad ISBN 9788121512183
- "Andhra Pradesh Portal: Dance". Andhra Pradesh Government. Archived from the original on 4 December 2010.
- Aryan Sing (2021) Guide to Indias History New Forest High School
