= Jatin Goswami =

Indian Sattriya dancer and choreographer

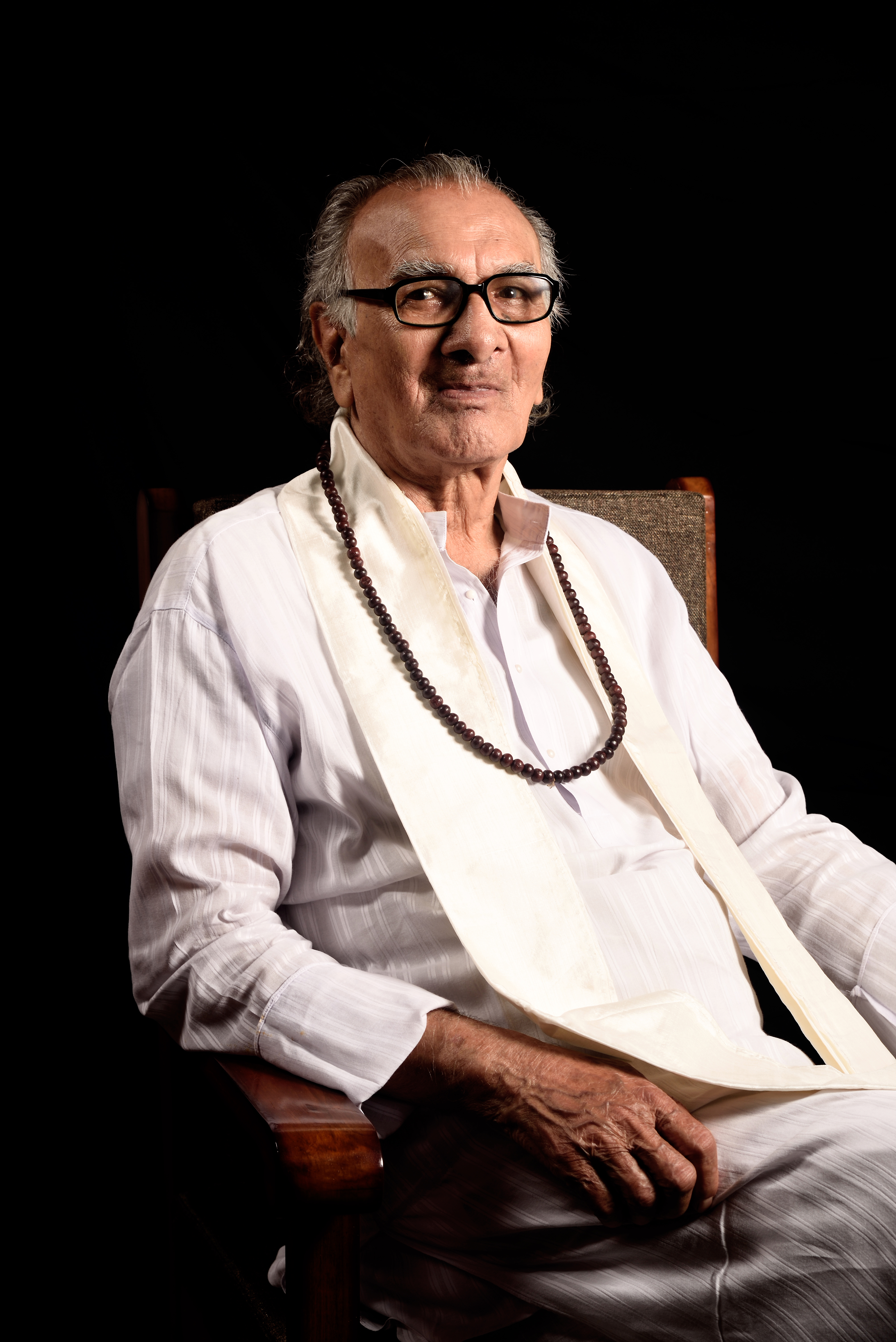
- Jatin Goswami
- Born: 2 August 1933 (age 93); Adhar Sattra, Dergaon, Golaghat district, Assam, India
- Occupations: Classical dancer Stage personality
- Known for: Sattriya
- Parent(s): Dharanidhar Dev Goswami; Chandraprova Devi
- Awards: Padma Bhushan; Padma Shri; Sangeet Natak Akademi Award; Nrityaachaarya; Bharatiyam Samman; Silpi Divas Award; Sangeet Jyoti Award; Assam Natya Sanmilon Award; Best Dance Director Award; Hiraprova-Chandrakanta Award; Nritya Siromoni Award; Leo-Expo Award; Sankaracharya Avatar Award; Anand Mohan Bhagawati Nartan Award; Bhabendra Nath Saikia Mobile Theatre Award (2013); Moghai Ojah Srijan Award,2015.

Jatin Goswami (born 2 August 1933) is an Indian dancer and choreographer, known as one of the most prominent exponents of the classical dance form of Sattriya. He is the founder director of Sattriya Akademi, Guwahati, a member of its Advisory Committee, and a former member of the General Council of the Sangeet Natak Akademi. He is also the founder of Alok Shilpi Sangha, a dance academy, and Pragjyoti Kala Parishad, a cultural organization, and is a recipient of the 2004 Sangeet Natak Akademi Award. The Government of India awarded him the fourth-highest civilian honor, the Padma Shri, in 2008, and the Padma Bhushan in 2025 for his contributions to Sattriya dance.

== Biography ==
Jatin Goswami was born on 2 August 1933 to Dharanidhar Dev Goswami and Chandraprova Devi at Adhar Sattra, a village near Dergaon in Golaghat district, in the Northeast Indian state of Assam. His early training in Sattriya was under his father but later, he trained under Gopiram Bayan and Babula Bayan, two known Sattriya masters, as well as Bishnuprasad Rabha, Dutta Muktiyar and Raseswar Saikia Barbayan at different points of time. In 1953, he established his own dance academy, Alok Shilpi Sangha, at his native place, but continued his dance training, learning Kathak from Ganesh Hiralal and Manipuri dance from Atomba Singh.

Turning his focus back to Sattriya, he founded Pragjyoti Kala Parishad, a cultural organization for promoting dance, in 1962, along with Kalaguru Bishnu Prasad Rabha and Roxeswar Saikia Barbayan. Goswami is known to be the only Sattriya performer to be engaged in conducting workshops and performances in various parts of the country. In 1994, he was nominated as a member of the General Council of the Sangeet Natak Akademi in 1994 and he contributed to the efforts in getting Sattriya declared as a classical dance form by the Akademi in 2000. He has performed in many places in India and abroad and is credited with the publication of five books on Sattriya viz. Maati Akhora, Nritya Paribhasik Sabda and Sangya, Jhumura Nach – Nadu Bhangee Nrityar Sikshya and Nrityar Prathamik Hasta Parichaya. When Sattiya Akademi was started in 2000, in Guwahati, under the aegis of the Sangeet Natak Akademi, he was appointed as the first director of the institution.

Goswami, holder of NrityaCharya title of the Sankari Sangeet Vidyapith, received the Sangeet Natak Akademi Award for Sattriya dance in 2004. Four years later, the Government of India awarded him the civilian honour of the Padma Shri, in 2008. He is also a recipient of honours such as Bharatiyam Samman of the Department of Tourism and Culture, Silpi Divas Award (1994), Sangeet Jyoti Award (2004), Assam Natya Sanmilon Award (1997), Best Dance Director Award of the Government of Assam (1997–98), Hiraprova-Chandrakanta Award (2006), Nritya Siromoni Award of the Asom Sattra Mohasobha, Leo-Expo Award (2010), Sankaracharya Avatar Award (2010), Anand Mohan Bhagawati Nartan Award (2012), Bhabendra Nath Saikia Mobile Theatre Award (2013) and Moghai Ojah Srijan Award (2015)

== See also ==
- Sattriya
- Ghanakanta Bora
