= Indira P. P. Bora =

Indian Satriya dancer

Guru Indira P. P. Bora
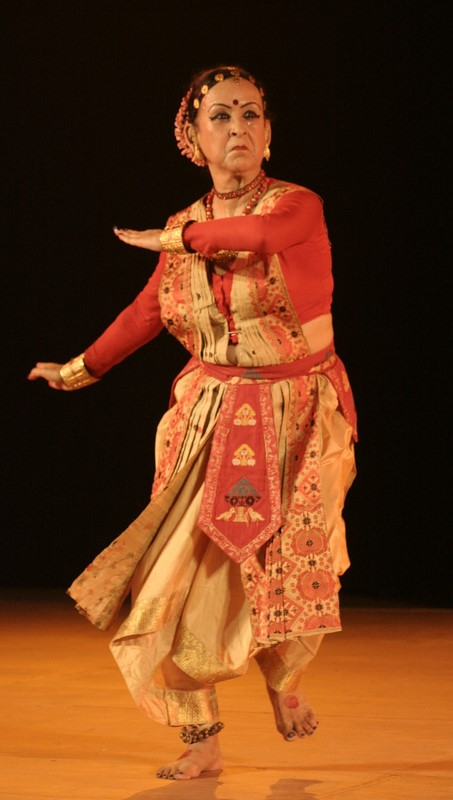
- Born: 1949 (age 76–77); Golaghat, Assam, India
- Citizenship: India
- Education: postgraduate
- Occupation: Satriya Dancer
- Known for: Satriya, Bharatnatyam, Kuchipudi
- Title: Guru
- Children: One
- Awards: Padma Shri (2020), Sangeet Natak Akademi Award (1996)
- Website: http://kalabhumiindia.com

Indira P. P. Bora is a Satriya dancer from Assam, India. Trained in Bharatnatyam for 13 years under Guru Rukmini Devi Arundale and in Kuchipudi under the guidance of Guru Vempati Chinna Satyam. Bora has promoted and performed Satriya in New Zealand, the United States, and Vietnam.

== Awards ==
- Sangeet Natak Akademi Award, 1996
- State Bishnu Rabha Award, 2004
- Jonaki Award as distinguished performing female artist.
- Senior Fellowship from Department of Culture, Government of India (for Satriya dance)
- Padma Shri 2020
