= Pushpa Bhuyan =

Indian dancer

- Born: c. 1946; Jorhat, Assam, India
- Died: 7 October 2015 (aged 69); New Delhi, India
- Occupation: Classical dancer
- Known for: Bharatanatyam and Sattriya
- Awards: Padma Shri; NE TV Lifetime Achievement Award

Pushpa Bhuyan (c. 1946 – 7 October 2015) was an Indian classical dancer who specialized in the Indian classical dance forms of Bharatanatyam and Sattriya. She was from the Northeast Indian state of Assam, and learned sattriya from Bhabananda Barbayan. She later studied bharatanatyam under Guru Mangudi Dorairaja Iyer. She has also tutored other dancers. A recipient of the North East Television Lifetime Achievement Award, Pushpa Bhuyan was honored by the Government of India, in 2002, with the fourth highest Indian civilian award of Padma Shri.

== See also ==
- Bharatanatyam
- Sattriya
