= Ghanakanta Bora =

Indian dancer

Guru Ghanakanta Bora
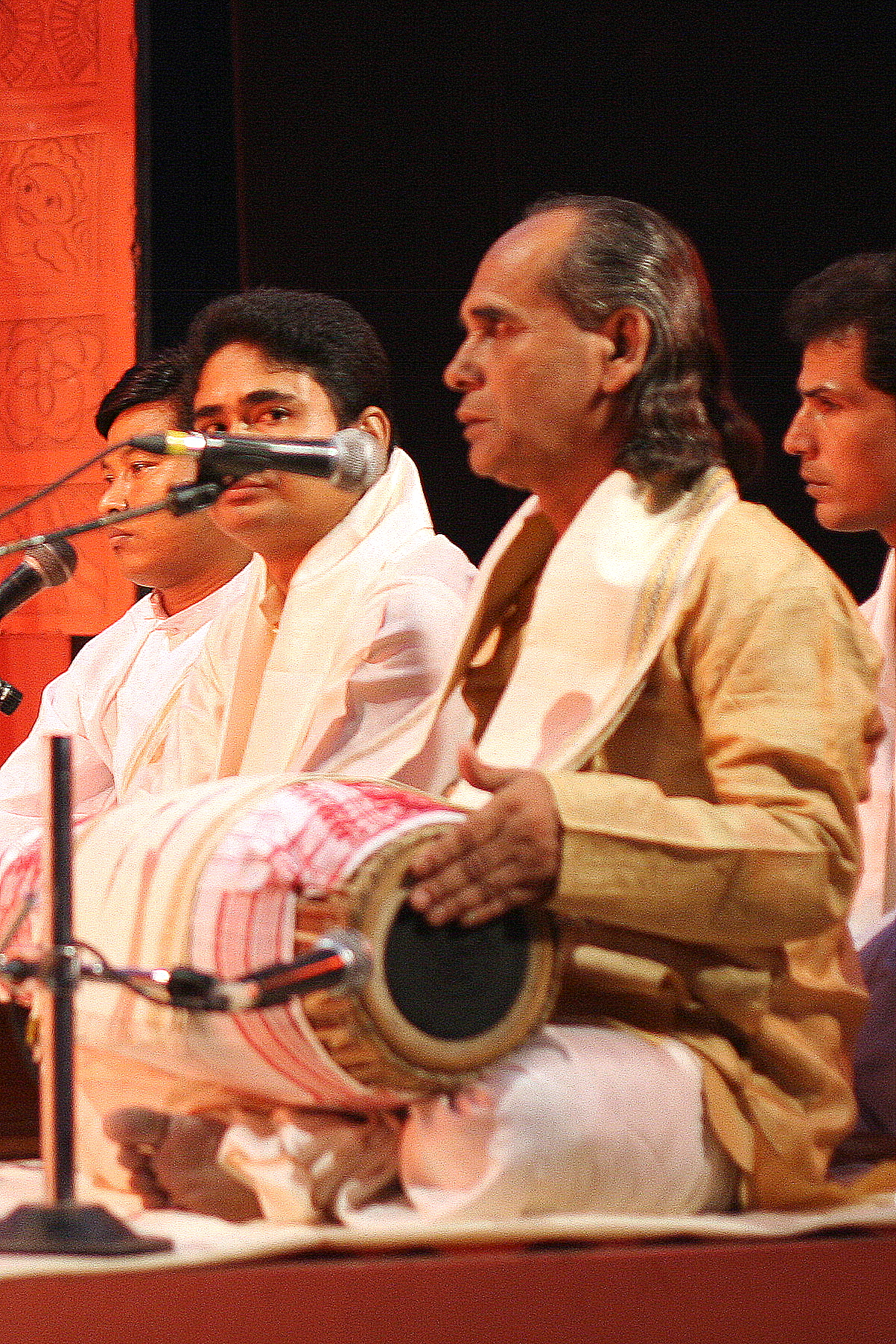
- Born: 1950 (age 75–76); Majuli, Bengal Presidency, British India (present-day Assam, India)
- Known for: Sattriya dance
- Awards: Padma Shri (2013), Sangeet Natak Akademi Award (2001)

Bayanacharya Ghanakanta Bora Muktiyar is a choreographer and guru (mentor) of Sattriya dance, a major Indian classical dance tradition of Assam, India. He is also a renowned instrumentalist and author. He won the prestigious Sangeet Natak Akademi Award in 2001.

== Early life ==
Shri Bora was born in 1950 in Majuli. At the age of four, he was brought to the Kamalabari Sattra in Majuli as a sattra inmate. At the age of six, Ghanakanta Bora began receiving training in Sattriya dance and music from the great exponent of the Vaishnavite tradition, the late Maniram Dutta Muktiyar Barbayan. Another renowned exponent of the tradition, Shri Raseswar Saikia Barbayan, taught him Natya (the art of dancing), Bayan (the art of playing the Khul/Mridanga), and Ojapali (a traditional dance style). Bora completed his training with distinction at an early age and was honored as a Barbayan (one of the principal artists in the sattra) at a young age.

== Career ==
His career began at the Sattra itself when he was selected as an "Adhyapak" (Guru) to coach and train the young pupils in the sattra. When the Kamalabari Sattra was being shifted due to frequent flooding of the Brahmaputra River, Shri Raseswar Saikia Barbayan brought him along to Guwahati to showcase his emerging talent.

In 1971 he was appointed as the teacher of Sattriya dance at the Bishnupur Kala Kendra in Shillong. In 1974 he was appointed as a teacher of Sattriya Dance and Bhaona in Sanakardeva Cultural Institute in New Delhi which was established with the efforts of Late President Fakhruddin Ali Ahmed and Late Jogendra Nath Saikia, then Member of Parliament. He returned to Guwahati in 1975 and joined as a teacher of Sattriya dance when the Sangeet Sattra was established in Guwahati.

In 1980 Shri Bora joined the State Music College, Assam as a teacher of Sattriya Dance and currently is settled in Guwahati. In 1987, he started his own institute called Sattriya Kala Kendra to impart training on Sattriya. The school has produced a group of young and talented performing artists from all over the world. Shri Bora has also established over 25 schools for training on Sattriya all over Assam.

Shri Bora has also performed extensively on various musical platforms, and festivals throughout the country. Shri Bora recently performed Sattriya Dance and played the Khol in 'Bharat Mahatsova' held in South East Asia, including Malaysia, Indonesia and Australia. He has collaborated with the Spic Macay for the past 6–7 years. Shri Ghanakanta Bora has also authored two books on Sattriya Dance: (i) Mati Akhora and (ii) Khol Sikhsa.

== Awards and honours ==
He is currently the Head of the Department of Sattriya Music and Dance of the Government State College of Music, Assam. Apart from his associations with various cultural institutions, he is associated with the Project of Support to Sattriya Dance, and Dance Music, Sangeet Natak Akademi, New Delhi as "Guru" providing advanced training in Sattriya Dance and Khol. Shri Bora is also associated with a national level Sangeet Natak Akademi project called "Onkia Bhaauna – RaamBijoy Naat" in Brajavali dialect.

He has been awarded the Padma Shri in 2013 by the Government of India in recognition of his distinguished contribution to Sattriya Dance. In 2001, he was awarded the prestigious Sangeet Natak Akademi Award for his seminal contribution to Sattriya Dance. He is also the Honorary Director of Maniram Dutta Muktiyar Sattriya Kala Kendra, Guwahati. Shri Bora is also a trustee of Srimanta Foundation for Culture and Society, Guwahati.

At the age of 15, he attained the title of 'Barbayan' at Majuli Sattra (The title of 'Barbayan' given by the Sattras is equivalent to the contemporary degree of Masters of Arts). In 2008, he was honored with the title of "Bayanacharya" which is the highest honor given by a Sattra. Till date only two Sattriya Gurus have been honored with the title of Bayanacharya – Late Maniram Dutta Muktiyar Barbayan and Shri Ghanakanta Bora.
