= Sarodi Saikia =

Assamese classical dancer

Sarodi Saikia (Assamese: শাৰদী শইকীয়া) is an Indian classical dancer, dance teacher, and chetar player from Assam. She is best known for her Sattriya dance. Saikia received the Sangeet Natak Akademi Award in 2015. In 2022, the Department of Cultural Affairs, Government of Assam, awarded the dancer the Bishnu Rabha Award.

== Career ==
Sarodi took formal dance lessons from the age of five. She initially learned Manipuri dance from Rathin Singh. She later learned Kathak dance and Sattriya dance. Raseswar Saikia Barbayan of Kamalabari Satra was a friend of Sarodi's father. He told her mother that he would teach Sarodi Satriya dance. After completing her schooling, Sarodi's father brought her to Guwahati at the age of 16 to learn Sattriya dance from Raseswar Shaikia Barbayan. Sarodi felt that Sattriya dance was complicated and noticed that very few people were learning it at the time. Before she could master this dance, Barbayan allowed her to perform on stage. He wanted Sarodi to popularize Sattriya dance and to give up the practice of Kathak and Manipuri dance and concentrate on Sattriya. Sarodi's parents also wanted her to commit to promoting Satriya dance.

In 2003, Sarodi opened Rangayan, an institute of dance, acting and music in Guwahati.

== Awards ==
- Sangeet Natak Akademi Award (2015)
- Bishnu Rabha Award (2022)
