= Bhagavata Mela =

Type of dance

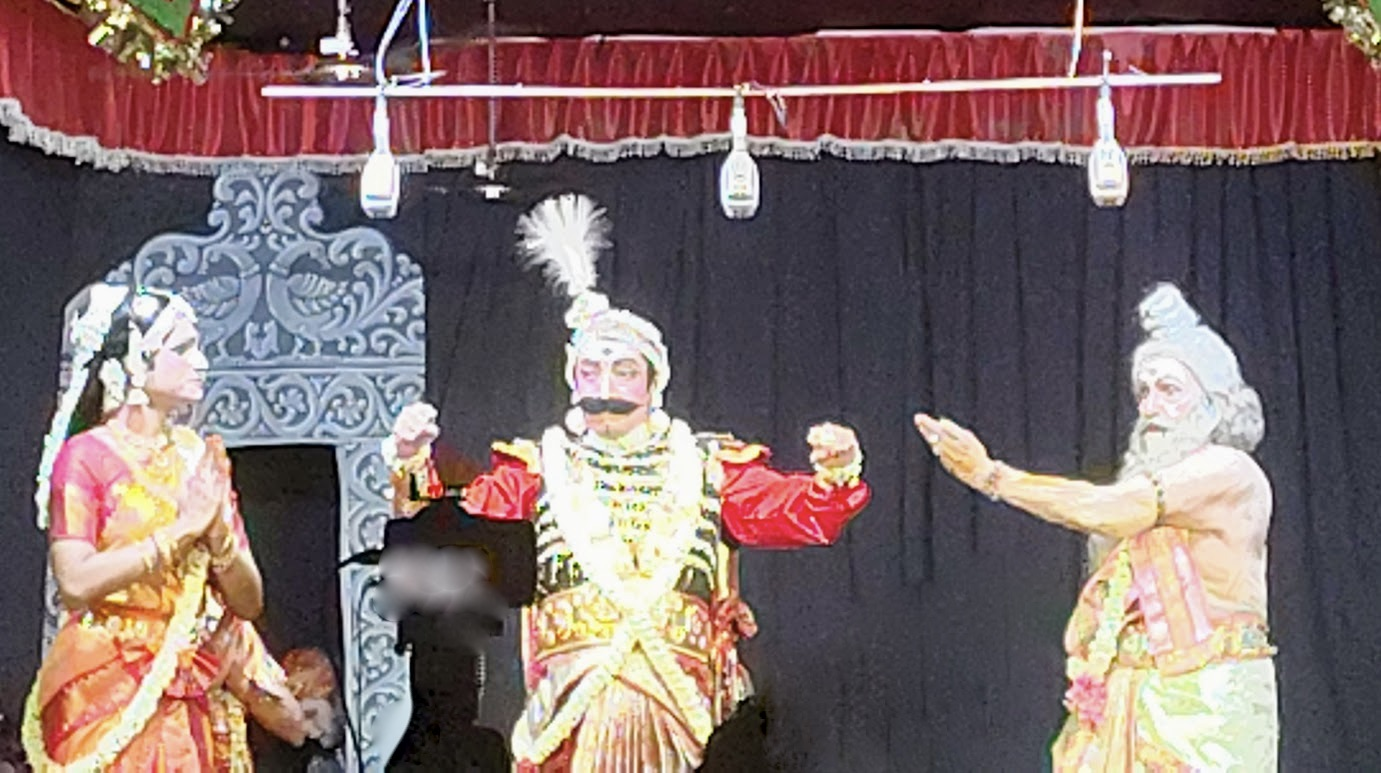
Artistes performing at the Bhagavata Mela Natakam on 'Prahalada Charitam' at Melattur, Tanjore.

Bhagavata Mela is a classical Indian dance that is performed in Tamil Nadu, particularly the Thanjavur area. It is choreographed as an annual Vaishnavism tradition in Melattur and nearby regions, and celebrated as a dance-drama performance art. The dance art has roots in a historic migration of practitioners of Kuchipudi, another Indian classical dance art, from Andhra Pradesh to the kingdom of Tanjavur.

The term Bhagavata, state Brandon and Banham, refers to the Hindu text Bhagavata Purana. Mela is a Sanskrit word that means "gathering, meeting of a group" and connotes a folk festival. The traditional Bhagavata Mela performance acts out the legends of Hinduism, set to the Carnatic style music.

== History ==
The origins of the Bhagavata Mela are in Kuchipudi, another more ancient classical Indian dance, found in Andhra Pradesh. The invasion of the region by Islamic armies led to the fall of a Hindu empire, which triggered the mass migration of Hindu performance artist families to Tamil Nadu in 16th century, where the dance evolved into modern Bhagavata Mela. Prior to its fall, the court records of the Deccan region based Vijayanagara Empire – known for its patronage of the Indian religions and arts – indicate that drama-dance troupes of Bhagavatas from Kuchipudi village performed at the royal court. The region saw wars and political turmoil, ending in the formation of Deccan Sultanates in 16th century. With the fall of Vijayanagara Empire and the destruction of temples and Deccan cities by the Muslim army around 1565, musicians and dance-drama artists migrated south, and Tanjore kingdom records indicate that some 500 such Kuchipudi artist families arrived from Andhra, were welcomed and granted land by the Telugu Hindu king Achuthappa Nayak, a settlement that grew to become modern Melattur near Tanjore (also called Thanjavur). These families maintained their Kuchipudi-inspired dance drama culture, in a form called Bhagavata Mela.

Kuchipudi declined and was a dying art in 17th-century Andhra, but in 1678, the last Shia Muslim Nawab of Golkonda, Abul Hasan Qutb Shah, saw a Kuchipudi performance and was so pleased that he granted the dancers lands around the Kuchipudi village, with the stipulation that they continue the dance-drama. The Shia Sultanate was overthrown in 1687 by the Sunni Mughal Emperor Aurangzeb. In order to regulate public and private morals, as well as end un-Islamic practices, Aurangzeb banned public performances of all music and dance arts, along with ordering the confiscation and destruction of musical instruments in Indian subcontinent under control of his Mughal Empire.

The Deccan region saw wars and political turmoil with Mughal imperial expansion ending the Deccan Sultanates by the end of the 17th century. During this period, more Bhagavatar community families moved south, invited by the newly established Maratha rajas in the Kaveri delta, to settle in and around Kumbakonam. These families maintained their Kuchipudi-inspired dance drama culture, in a form called Bhagavata Mela.

== Repertoire ==
The Bhagavata Mela is traditionally celebrated in Hindu temple grounds or next to a temple, starting after dusk and through the night, and like the original Kuchipudi artists, male Brahmins were the artists who played the role of men and women characters in the underlying story. Modern productions include both male and female artists, and has evolved to show influences of both Kuchipudi and Bharatanatyam – the main classical dance of Tamil Nadu.

Like all classical dances of India, the Bhagavata Mela incorporates sophisticated gestures as sign language combined with intricate footwork and acting (abhinaya) to communicate a religious story with spiritual message. These aspects of the Bhagavata Mela have roots in the Natya Shastra, the ancient Hindu text on performance arts. The performance includes Nritta, Nritya and Natya. The Nritta performance is abstract, fast and rhythmic aspect of pure dance. The Nritya is slower and expressive aspect of the dance that attempts to communicate feelings, storyline particularly with spiritual themes. The Natya is a play performed by a team of artists. The roots of abhinaya are also found in the Natyashastra text which describes basic units of dance, the gestures and movements that connect with the audience and aesthetically arouses joy in the spectator, and transports the individual into a super sensual inner state of being.

The communication in Bhagavata Mela is in the form of expressive gestures (mudras or hastas) synchronized to music. The gestures and facial expressions convey the ras (sentiment, emotional taste) and bhava (mood) of the underlying story. Like other Hindu classical dances, the artist successfully expresses the spiritual ideas by paying attention to four aspects of a performance: Angika (gestures and body language), Vachika (song, recitation, music and rhythm), Aharya (stage setting, costume, make up, jewelry), and Sattvika (artist's mental disposition and emotional connection with the story and audience, wherein the artist's inner and outer state resonates). Abhinaya draws out the bhava (mood, psychological states).

The Bhagavata Mela stories are typically from the Hindu Epics or the Puranas, with Prahlada Charitram being particularly popular. The music is Carnatic style, and most of the underlying story is sung to the rhythm of the music while the dance artists perform. The repertoire is aided by an orchestra of musical instruments, with mridangam (drum) and cymbals providing the beat, and flute, string instruments and harmonium completing the ensemble.
