= Assamese jewellery =

Traditional jewellery of Assam, India

Axomiya Gohona Assamese Jewellery
- Geographical indication
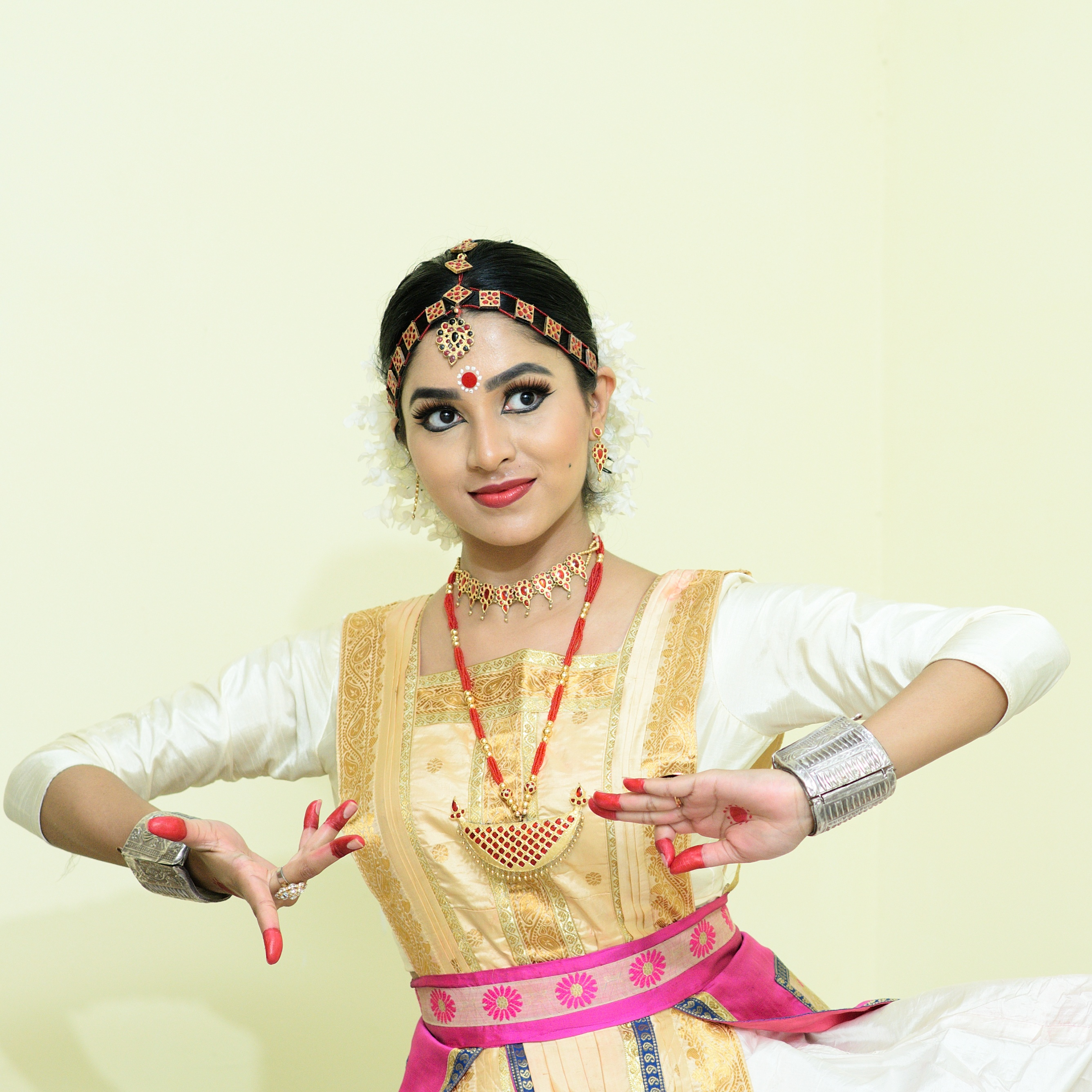
- A Sattriya dancer wearing traditional Assamese jewellery
- Description: Traditional handcrafted jewellery of Assam made primarily from gold and silver
- Type: Handicraft
- Area: Assam
- Country: India
- Registered: 2025
- Material: Gold, Silver, Gemstones, Amber

Assamese jewellery or Axomiya Gohona refers to the traditional handcrafted ornaments of the Indian state of Assam. The jewellery is typically made from pure gold (locally known as Kesa Xoon) or silver with gold plating, often adorned with colourful gemstones, amber and enamel work. It is widely worn during festivals such as Bihu, weddings, and other ceremonial occasions.

== History ==
Jewellery-making traditions in Assam date back to ancient times. The use of gold and ornaments in Assam is attested in early textual sources. The Arthashastra contains an early reference to gold associated with the region, while the Kalika Purana and Yogini Tantra refer to silver ornaments and gold utensils, respectively. Traditional Assamese jewellery designs commonly draw on regional flora and fauna, musical instruments, and objects of everyday life. Jewellery items like Thuria (Note: Thuria is a traditional earring worn by the Bodo-Kachari tribes, especially those in Upper Assam. Similar earplug-type earrings are seen among the tribes of northern Arunachal Pradesh like Mishmis, Nyishis and Adis. The Bodos call the Thuria "Doula". Similar earplug earings worn by Dimasa women are called "Khmaothai", while those worn by Tripuri women are called "Wakhum".), Madoli (Note: "Li" in Deori language means necklace;"Li-Kotung" means necklace and earrings. Madoli, Junbiri, Dugdugi are some of the ornaments the Deori women use while performing ‘Bisu’. Durum-li or Madol-li are alternate names in Deori language for the same Dhol shaped necklace; "Durum" in Deori and "Madol" in general means Dhol.), Junbiri and Gam Kharu (Note: In earlier times, the gam kharu was worn by tribal chiefs in Assam. Historical chronicles use the title gam—said to be a derivative of the word gram—for chiefs or village headmen among communities such as the Misings, Chutias (as in Narai Gam), Daflas (as in Kabakkara Gam), Singphos (as in Bisa Gam), and Mishmis. The ornament is said to have acquired the name gam kharu because it was a bracelet (kharu) worn by a gam. The Tungkhungia Buranji also records the gam kharu as a bracelet worn by men. Although formerly worn by men, the ornament is now primarily associated with women. Gam Kharu is known as Gam Ushung in the Deori language. The Chutia king gifted gold bangles to the Ahom king and his ministers, which could be Gam Kharu, since Gam Kharu was generally worn by men. Similar types of bangles worn by Bodo women are called Muthi Asan.) have origins in Bodo-Kachari people, which include Bodos, Dimasas, Chutias, Deoris, etc.

Buranjis record the wide prevalence of different kinds of jewellery in the Chutia kingdom and later Ahom kingdom. As gold was produced abundantly within the region, rulers and members of the royal families of the kingdoms of Assam wore garments and ornaments made of gold. Kings wore gem-set gold rings, anklets, robes embroidered with gold thread, gamkharu, five-stranded, seven-stranded and nine-stranded necklaces, and pearls suspended from the ears with gold thread. Queens likewise wore mekhelas embroidered with gold-thread motifs, along with various gold ornaments.

The 1428 copperplate inscription of Chutia king Durlabhnarayan mentions a swarnakara or goldsmith named Krishna Sadhu. The last Chutia king Nitipal, in order to establish peace with the invading Ahom army, sent a lot of gifts to the Ahom king and his ministers, which included jewellery items like gold Keru earrings (Note: Other Buranji references include Satsari Buranji, Deodhai Assam Buranji and Purani Assam Buranji), gold bangles (probably Gam Kharu) and gold foot bangles. As per Assam Buranji (SM), after the defeat of the Chutia king, the Ahoms brought in the gold waist ornament Kakali of the Chutia queen and offered it to the shrine at Sadiya. Apart from the jewellery, many artisans including goldsmiths (Sonari), who were experts in making ornaments, were also moved from the Chutia capital Sadiya to the Ahom capital. (Note: As per Buranjis, Nangram, the queen of Ahom king Bhoga Raja was a daughter of a Chutia sonari (goldsmith))

During the reign of Ahom king Pratap Singhaa, the people who came with Sundar Gohain of Koch Behar worked as goldsmiths in the Ahom kingdom. During the reign of Suramphaa (1641–1644), known in the chronicles as Bhoga Raja, the Ahom court introduced sumptuary regulations governing dress, ornaments and other visible markers of social status. Hindus were forbidden from wearing gold beads, rings and thuria, while Ahoms were required to live according to the standards assigned to their rank; an Ahom who attempted to exceed his prescribed position could be put to death. These measures formed part of a wider set of restrictions that also regulated house construction and women's clothing. During the reign of Ahom king Rudra Singha, significant efforts were made to improve the quality and craftsmanship of gold ornaments in Assam. Historical accounts note that goldsmiths from Assam were sent to cities such as Jaipur and Benares to learn advanced techniques of ornament-making. Prior to this period, locally made ornaments were considered less refined. Upon their return, two trained artisans were appointed at Rajshal by the king and were conferred the title of Bardoloi, leading to improvements in craftsmanship. Subsequently, the production of gold-plated ornaments expanded, and the goldsmithing tradition in Assam evolved into a thriving cottage industry.

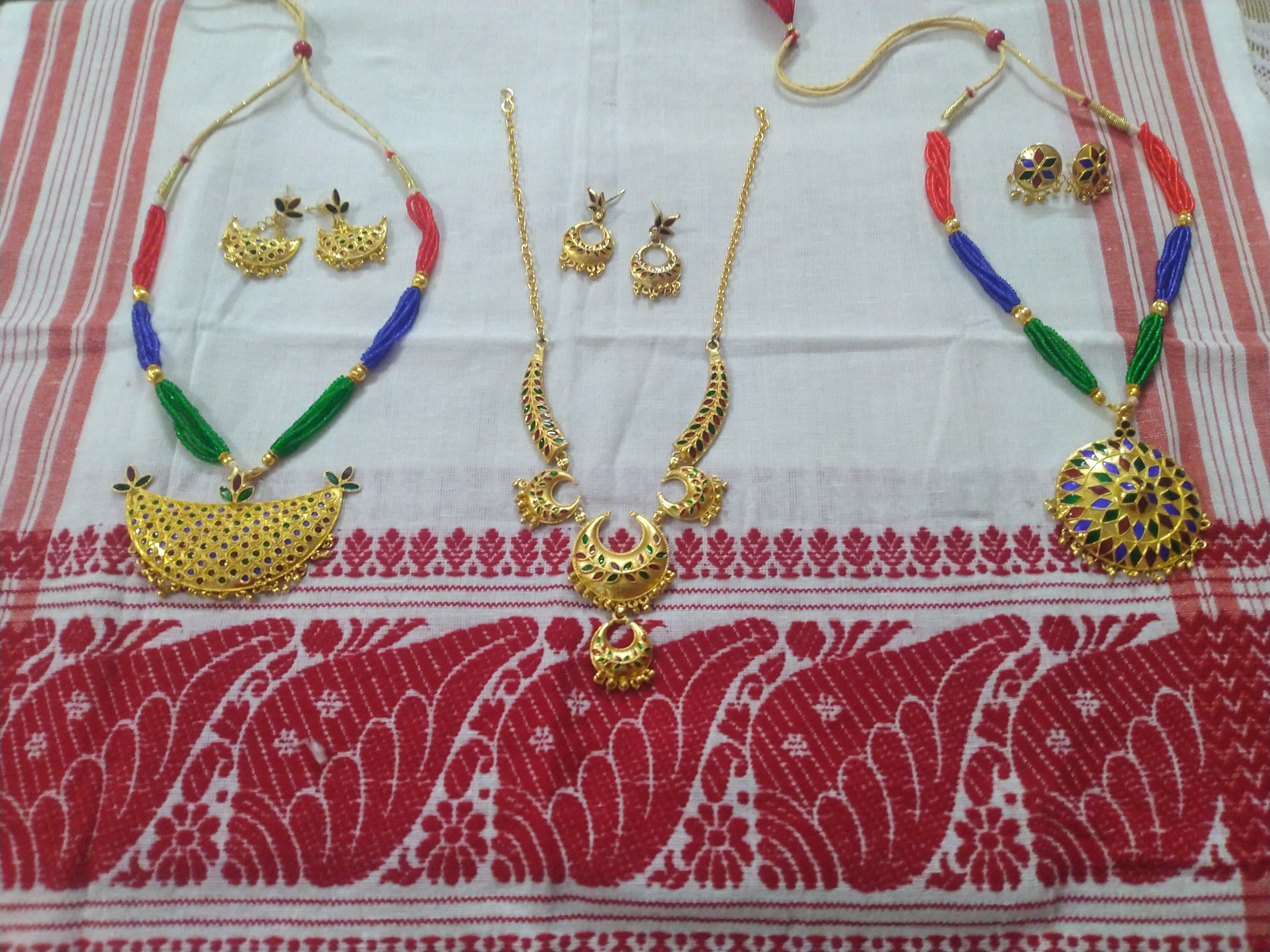
Assamese jwellery

== Material and Types ==
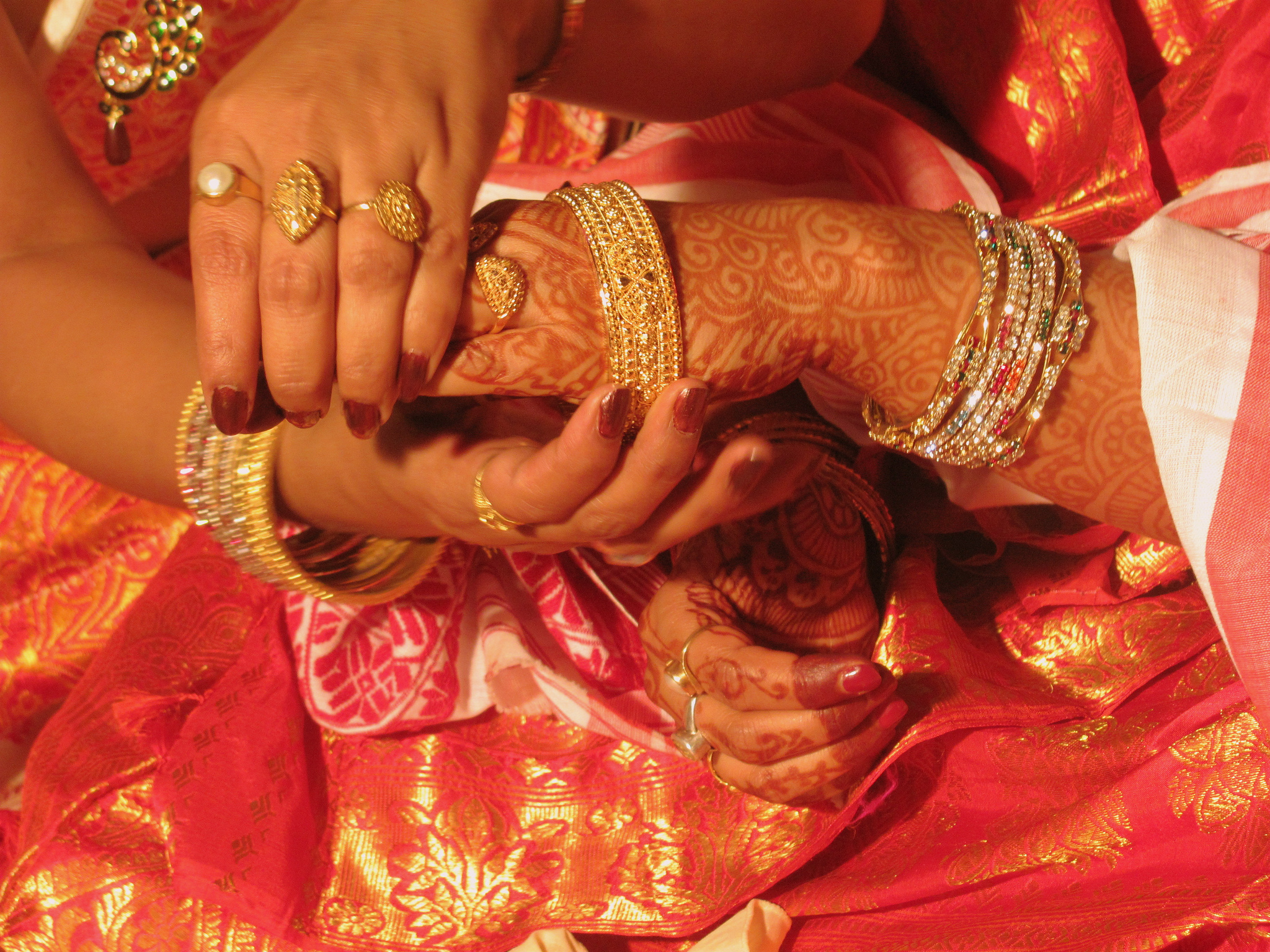
Juroon, A Assamese wedding ceremony where members of the groom's family doles up the bride-to-be with jewellery.

Artisans employ handcrafting techniques passed down through generations, including engraving, filigree work, and enamel decoration. Designs often incorporate motifs of birds, flowers, musical instruments, and cultural symbols. Traditional Assamese jewellery is primarily made using Gold (Kesa Xoon) – often of high purity, Silver – frequently gold-plated, Gemstones and enamel (mina work) – in red, green, blue, black, and white shades and Amber.

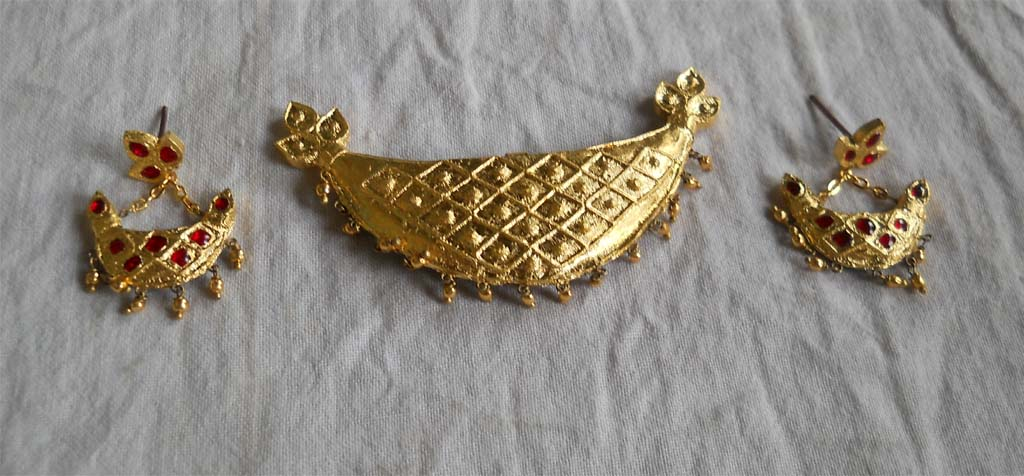
Junbiri

Assamese jewellery types include necklaces, bangles, earrings, rings and other ornaments. Necklace types include Junbiri, Dhulbiri or Madoli and Dugdugi. Junbiri is one of the most well-known Assamese ornaments, characterised by its crescent (moon-like) shape. The term derives from jun (moon). It is widely worn during festivals and weddings. Dholbiri, also known as motabiri or Madoli, is a traditional necklace inspired by the shape of the dhol (drum). It is often adorned with intricate patterns. Historically, the term motabiri was used to refer to a large, drum-shaped ornament made without the use of gemstones. In earlier times, this ornament was worn exclusively by men. In contemporary practice, dhulbiri ornaments are crafted using gemstones as well as enamel work in colours such as black, red, and green. Over time, the usage of the ornament has expanded, and it is now worn by women as well. Dugdugi or Doogdoogi is a gold pendant resembling a small leaf. It is worn hanging from the neck to the chest.

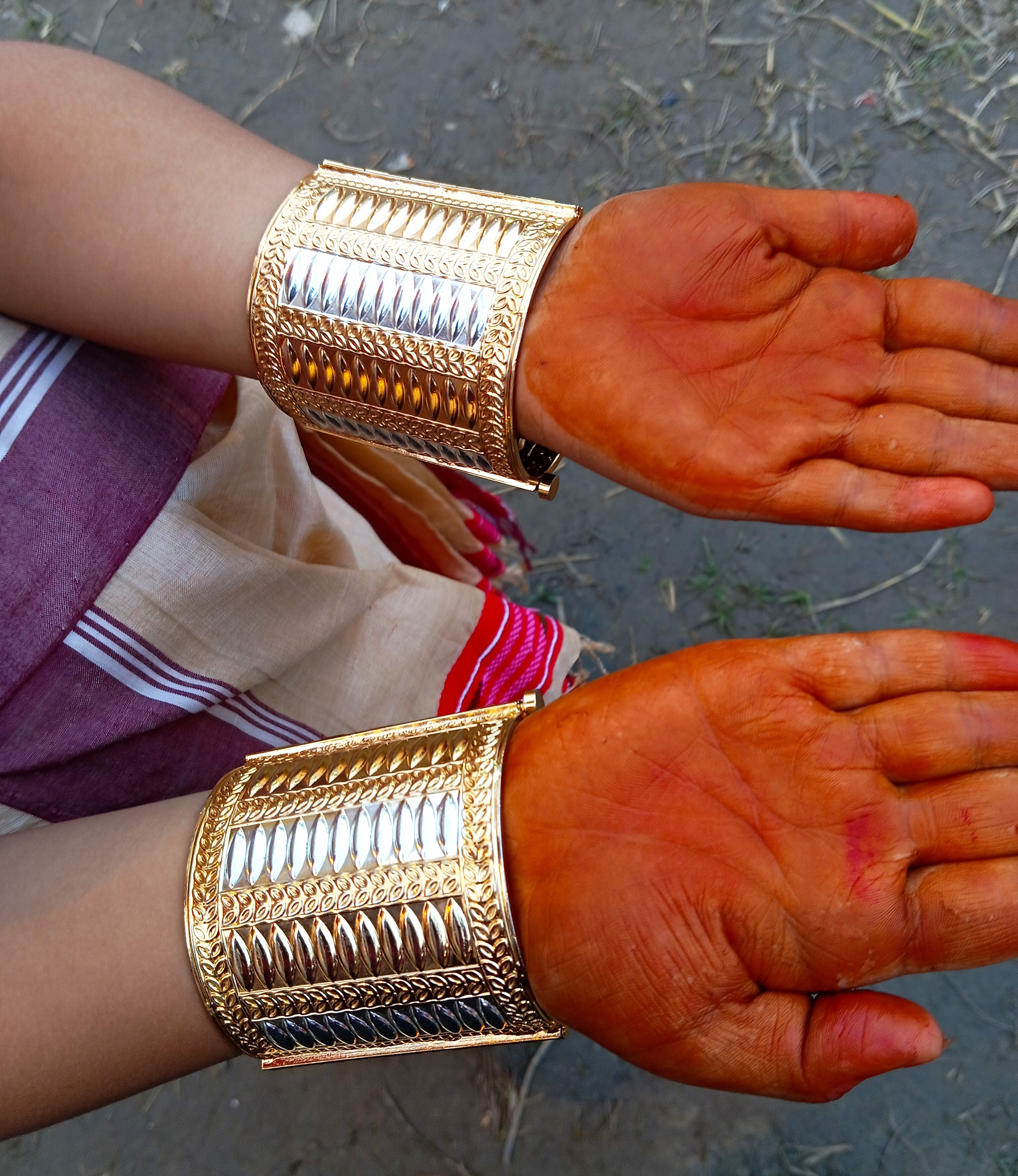
Gamkharu bangle

Gamkharu is a traditional broad bracelet, usually made of gold or silver. It dates back to the pre-Ahom period and symbolizes strength, prosperity, and feminine power. Historically associated with royalty, it later became a common bridal ornament. Earring types include Keru and Lokaparo. Keru are moon-shaped earrings, often decorated with enamel and gemstones. Lokaparo earrings feature two pigeons facing each other, symbolizing love and companionship. Thuria is another type of cylindrical-shaped earring with the end shaped like a flower. Other jewellery types includes rings such as Senpata, Jethinejia, and Bakhorpotiya, along with various bead-based ornaments like Moni necklaces.

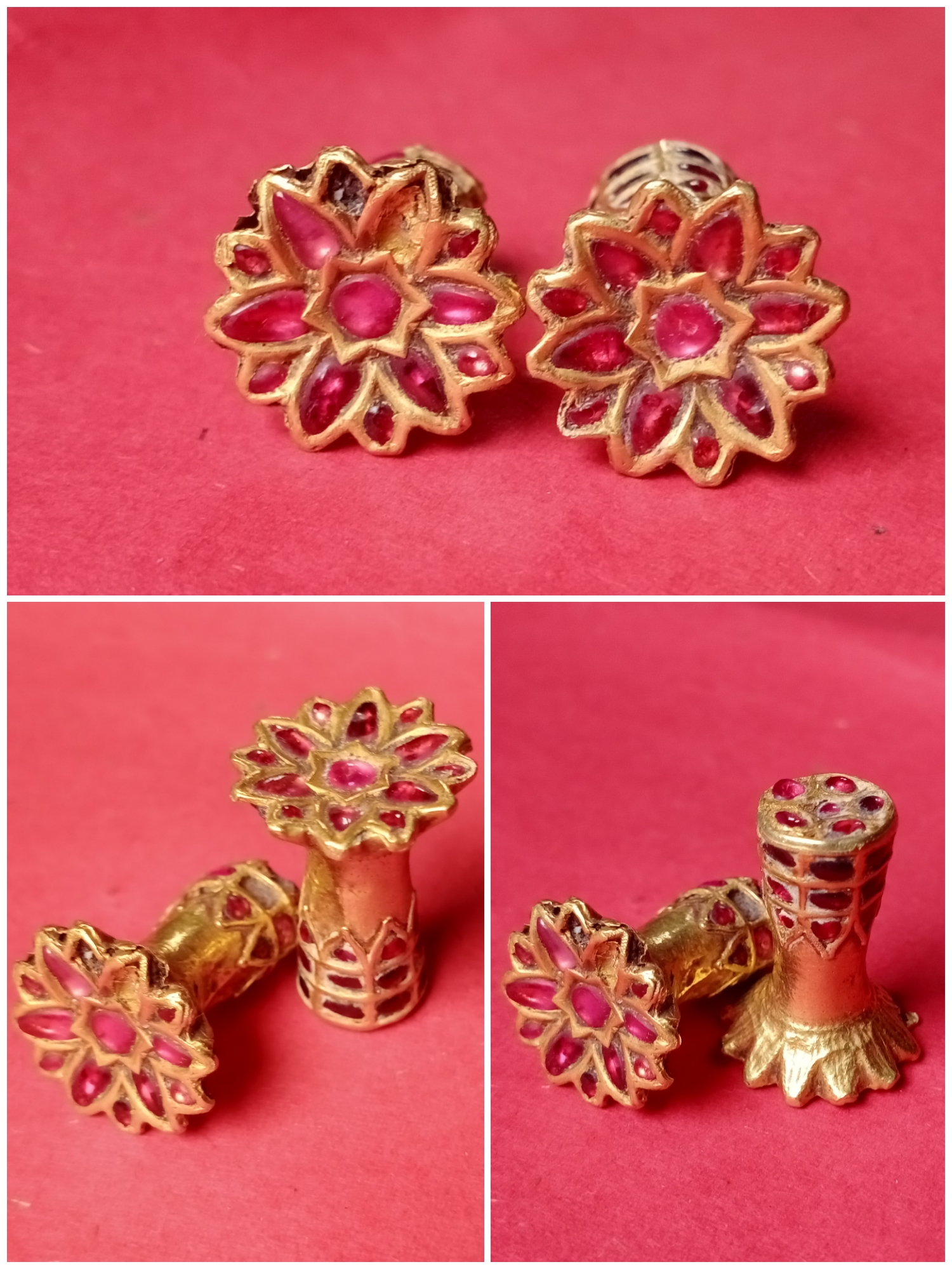
Thuriya, an Assamese style earing

== Bibliography ==
- Jacquesson, Francois, Ahom Buranji Translation : Chutia-Ahom wars
- Barua, G.C (1939), Ahom Buranji
