= Shobana Sahajananan =

Shobana Sahajananan (born 26 April 1987) is a Malaysian Indian classical dancer.

== Biography ==
Sahajananan specializes in the classical dance forms of Odissi, Bharathanatyam and Bollywood. She studied Bharatanatyam under Guru Devi Maheswaran, later pursuing Odissi under guru Ramli Ibrahim. She performed her Arangetram (graduation from Bharathanatyam) in May 2012. She also taught Bollywood dance in Kuala Lumpur Performing Arts Centre (KLPAC).

Sahajananan choreographs, conducts workshops, dance lecture demos and creates new Bharatanatyam, Bollywood, Modern/Classical fusions and experimental dance. In October 2011 she performed in the Short and Sweet Dance festival at KLPAC. She performs on stage extensively.

== See also ==
- Dance in India
