= Sattriya =

One of the classical dances of India

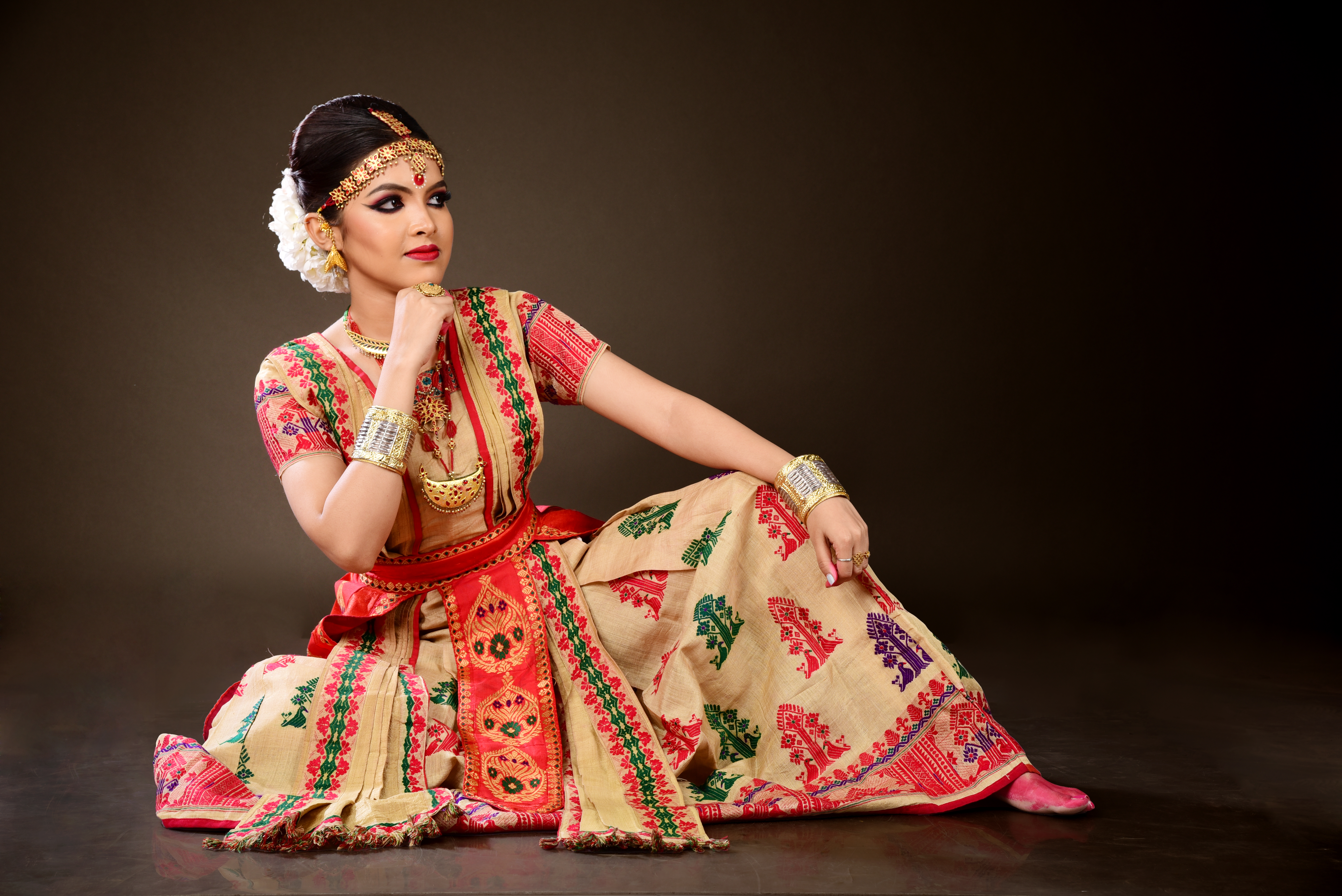
- Performance by Noopur Talukdar
- Genre: Indian classical dance
- Origin: Assam

Sutradhaar Dance (Satriya)

Sattriya Dance performed by Antara Goswami, sung by Jyotishman Moran and their group

Sattriya, or Sattriya Nritya, is a major Indian classical dance. It was initially created as part of Bhaona which are performances of Ankiya Nat, one-act plays, originally created by Sankardev, a 15th-16th century polymath from Assam. These dances are part of the living traditions today of Sattra, which are communities of live-in devotees belonging to the Ekasarana Dharma, a Hindu sect established by Sankardev.

The themes played are related to Krishna, as well as other avatars of Vishnu such as Rama, and stories from the epics Mahabharata and the Ramayana.

On November 15 of the year 2000, the Sangeet Natak Akademi of India recognised Sattriya as one of the eight classical dances of India. Modern Sattriya explores many themes and plays, and its performances are staged worldwide.

== History ==
Sattriya is a classical dance of India, tracing its roots to ancient drama and music texts of India, particularly Bharata Muni's Nātya Śāstra. Its first complete compilation is dated to between 200 BCE and 200 CE, but estimates vary between 500 BCE and 500 CE. The most studied version of the Nātya Śāstra text consists of about 6000 verses structured into 36 chapters. The text describes the theory of Tāṇḍava dance (Shiva), the theory of rasa, of bhāva, expression, gestures, acting techniques, basic steps, standing postures – all of which are part of Indian classical dances.

Dance and performance arts, states this ancient text, are a form of expression of spiritual ideas, virtues, and the essence of scriptures.

The history of dance arts in Assam goes back to antiquity, as evidenced by copper plate inscriptions and sculpture relating to Shaivism and Shaktism traditions. Singing and musical traditions, similarly, have been traced to Assamese chorus singing tradition for the Hindu epics: the Ramayana and the Mahabharata.

The modern form of Sattriya is attributed to the 16th century Sankaradeva, who systematized the dance using the ancient texts, and introduced drama and expressive dancing (nritta and nritya) as a form of a community religious art for emotional devotion to Krishna.

Since the 16th century, the Sattriya art grew as part of the Vaishnava bhakti movement, in Hindu monasteries called Sattra. The art was developed and practiced by monks in the form dance-dramas about legends and mythologies of Krishna, particularly from texts such as the Bhāgavata Purāna. One distinctive part of the Sattriya dance inside temples and monasteries is that the dance is not celebrated before any idol, but is performed before a copy of the Bhagavata Purana placed in eastern (sun rise) corner called Manikut of the dance hall (namghar).

These dance-dramas were, in the early days, written and directed by the Assamese poet-saint Sankaradeva, and by his principal disciple Madhavadeva. They were mostly composed during the 16th century. Once the domain of male monks, it is now performed by male as well as female dancers. In the second half of the 20th century, Sattriya Nritya moved from the sanctum of Assam's sattras / monasteries to the metropolitan stage.

The Sangeet Natak Akademi recognized Sattriya Nritya as an official classical dance of India in 2000. Sattriyas are now performed on world's stages.

== Repertoire ==
Satriya Dance

Like the other schools of Indian Classical dance, Sattriya encompasses the principles required of a classical dance form: the treatises of dance and dramaturgy, like Nātya Śāstra, Abhinaya Darpana, and Śārngadeva's Sangīta Ratnākara; The Sangīta Ratnākara of Śārngadeva complements his Bhakti Ratnakara, which traces the Upanishads, Bhagavad Gita, Yoga and Vedanta themes, the ethical values such as non-violence (ahimsa), truthfulness (satya) and others, thus premising a theological foundation to Sattriya. To Shankaradeva, religious values, ethics, joys of life and performance arts were intimately linked, and he asked the leaders of Hindu monasteries to compose at least one play, during their tenure, before they die.

Sattriya repertoire (mārg) includes nritta (pure dance, solo), nritya (expressive dance, solo), and nātya (dramatic play, group). Like all major classical Indian dance forms, those three categories of performances are:

- The Nritta performance is abstract, fast and rhythmic aspect of the dance. The viewer is presented with pure movement in Nritta, wherein the emphasis is the beauty in motion, form, speed, range and pattern. This part of the repertoire has no interpretive aspect, no telling of story.
- The Nritya is slower and expressive aspect of the dance that attempts to communicate feelings, story line particularly with spiritual themes. In a nritya, the performance expands to include story-telling, the silent expression of words through gestures and body motion set to musical notes. This part of a repertoire is more than sensory enjoyment, it aims to engage the emotions and mind of the viewer.
- The Nātya is a play, typically a team performance, but can be acted out by a solo performer where the dancer uses certain standardized body movements to indicate a new character in the underlying story. A Nātya incorporates the elements of a Nritya. Kuchipudi historically relied on a team of dancer-actors, while in modern times Kuchipudi productions include solo or duo performances.

The hand gestures (mudras), footwork (padas), postures, rhythms, training of artistes and other aspects of the Sattriya dance drama closely follow those described in Nātya Śāstra and other classical Hindu dance texts, and are quite similar to other major classical dances such as Odishi, Kathakali, Bharatanātyam and others found in southern and northern India. Some basic elements and features of Sattriya match those found in the Manipuri dance found in neighboring Manipur state.

Sattriya Nritya is a genre of dance drama that tells mythical and religious stories through hand and face expressions. The basic dance unit and exercise of a Sattriya is called a Mati Akhara, equal 64 just like in Natya Shastra, are the foundational sets dancers learn during their training. The Akharas are subdivided into Ora, Saata, Jhalak, Sitika, Pak, Jap, Lon and Khar. A performance integrates two styles, one masculine (Paurashik Bhangi, energetic and with jumps), and feminine (Stri Bhangi, Lasya or delicate).

Traditionally, Sattriya was performed only by bhokots (male monks) in monasteries as a part of their daily rituals or to mark special festivals. Today, in addition to this practice, Sattriya is also performed on stage by men and women who are not members of the sattras, on themes that go beyond the mythological.

The plays choreographed in a Sattriya are those found in Hindu texts such as the Bhāgavata Purāna, the Epics, and the compositions by Assamese scholars.

=== Dresses ===
The dress of Sattriya dance is primarily of two types: the male dress comprising the dhoti, chadar and the paguri (turban) and the female dress comprising the ghuri, chadar and kanchi (waist cloth). Traditionally the dresses were of white or raw silk color with use of red, blue and yellow for specific dance numbers. In earlier times velvet and satin materials were mostly used for the dresses. With change of time, as this dance form evolved from the sattras onto stage, the design and materials of the dance dresses changed. Pat (also spelled paat) – a silk produced in Assam which is derived from the mulberry plant and muga silk (golden silk of Assam) is also used in preparing the dance dress. Other bright colours are also used in the female dresses. These hand-woven materials normally have intricate local motifs like Kingkhap, Miri Motif, Kolka etc.

Uses of play-specific dress are also seen in Sattriya dance. The dress of Krishna Nritya and Nadubhangi Nritya is of yellow and blue keeping in line with the attire of Lord Krishna. The Sutradhar Nritya also has its specific white dress with a special turban.

Traditional Assamese jewellery is used in Sattriya dance. The jewellery is made by a unique technique in Kesa Sun (raw gold). Artistes wear Kopali on the forehead, Muthi Kharu and Gam Kharu (bracelets), different type of neck pieces like Mata Moni (for male dancers), Golpata, Dhulbiri (shaped like the musical instrument dhol), Bena (pendant shaped like a crescent), Jethipata (lizard shaped), Dugdugi (leaf shaped), Senpata (eagle shaped), Dhansira (strand of rice grain) and Lokaparo (pigeon design). Earrings are made in similar designs and also Thuka Suna and Keru are worn by dancers. Female dancers wear white flowers in the hair.

The dresses of Ankiya Naats (dramas) are colourful and character specific. Use of Mukha (Masks) to depict demons and special characters are also unique of this dance form. The art of mask-making is an integral part of Sattriya culture and originated in the Sattras of Assam. Beautifully decorated turbans and crowns made by the local artisans are used in the Ankiya Naats.

The facial makeup of Sattriya dance resembles other classical dance forms of India. However, in earlier times traditional materials and herbs were used for make up.

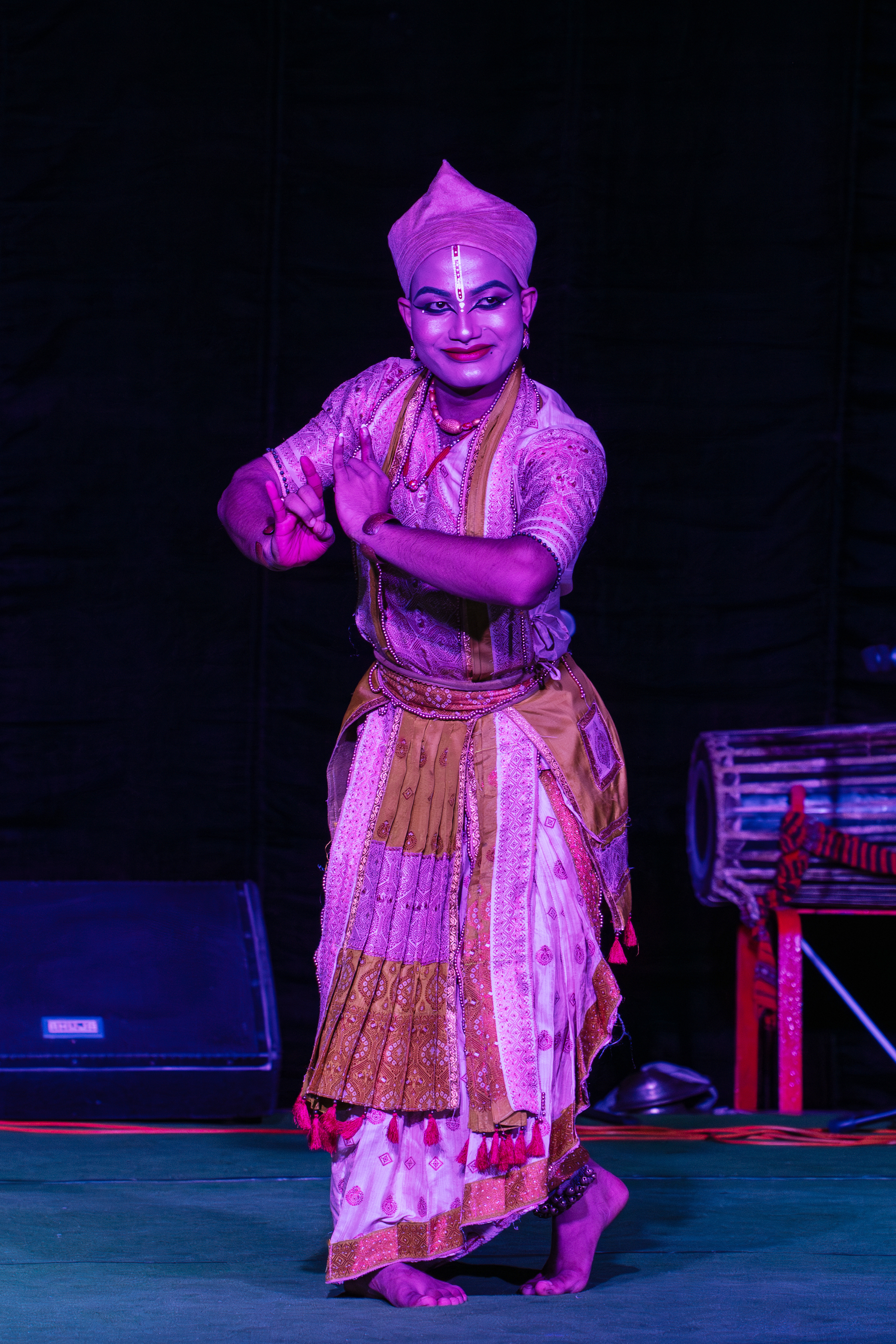
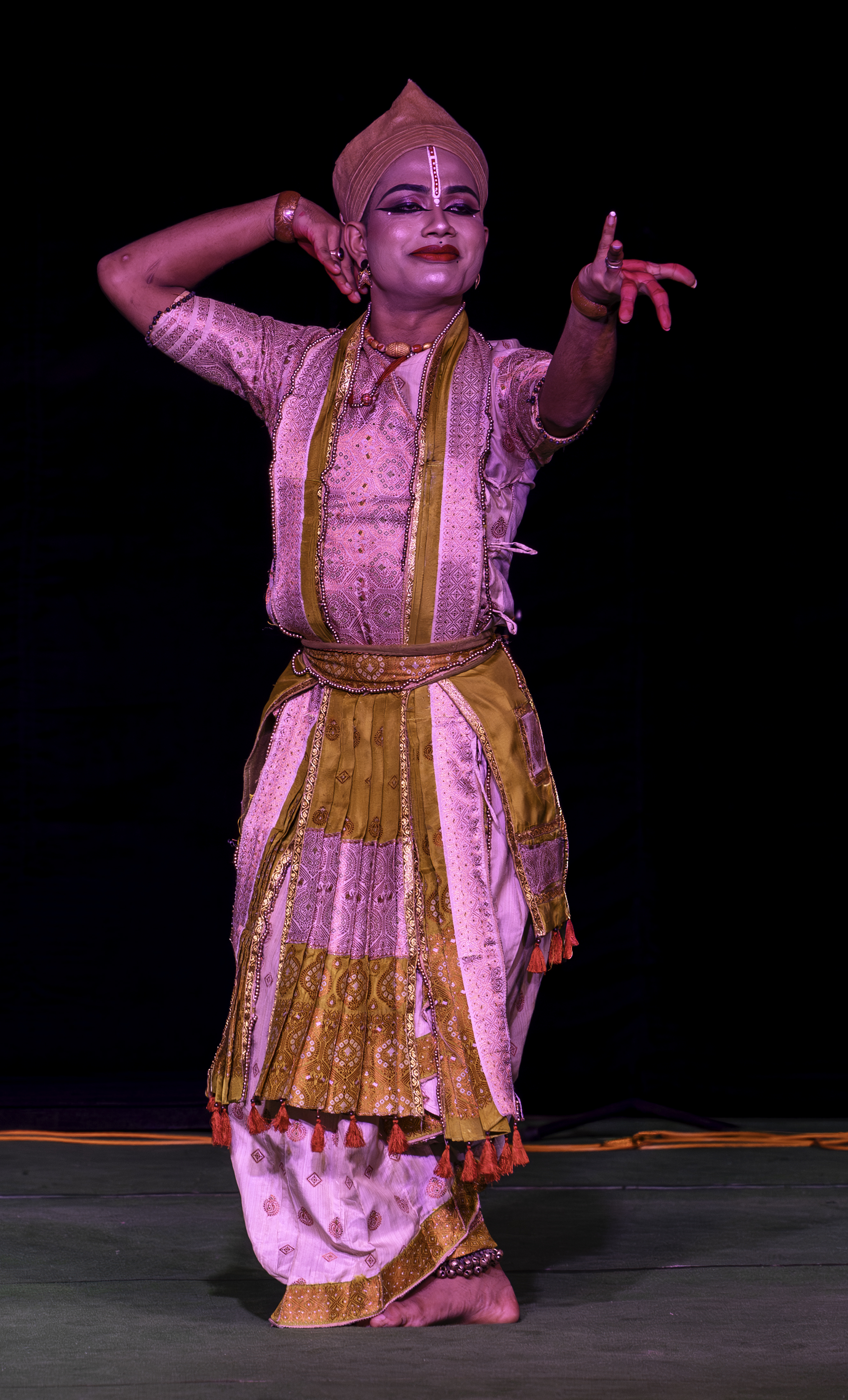
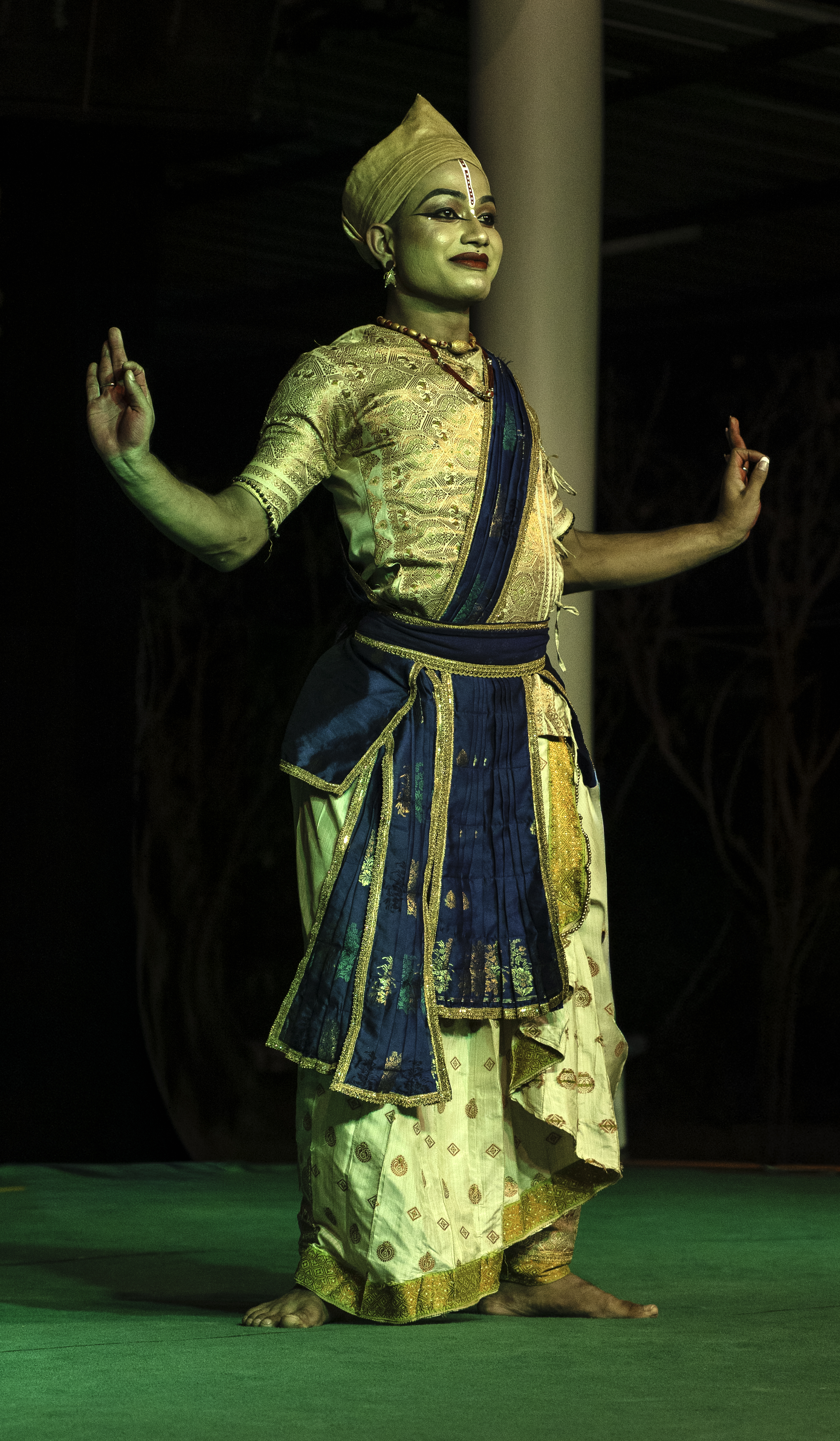

=== Music and instruments ===
Sattriya Nritya is accompanied by musical compositions called bargeets (composed by Sankardeva and Shree Shree Madhavdev, among others) which are based on classical ragas.

A key musical instrument that accompanies a Sattriya performance is the khol (two-faced, asymmetrical drum quite different from the rest of India) played with fingers. The special shape and materials of construction – clay, wood, leather, rice dough, iron filings, rope straps – of Sattriya khol produces a high pitch with the right side (Daina), while producing a deep bass sound on the left (Bewa).

Accompanying the khol are various types of Tālas or cymbals (Manjira, Bhortal, Bihutal, Patital, Khutital) and the flute (bansuri). Other instruments like the violin and the harmonium have been recent additions. (Note: In some compositions, the following additional regional musical instruments, adopted from regional folk dances, complete the orchestra: Bin, Tokari, Dotara, Nagara and different styles of drums (mrdanga, dhol, dambaru, etc).)

=== Styles ===
A Sattriya performance comes in many styles such as the Sutradhara (or Sutra-bhangi), character specific Bhangi, Prabesh, Nritya and Jhumura. The Sutradhara is a style that tells a story and presents the spiritual values of Vaisnavism in a complete classical format: nritta, nritya and natya. One feature of the Sutradhara (or Sutradhari) style is the included commentary for the audience in local language.

Ankiya Nat is a subgenre consisting of one-act plays of Sattriya. These are dedicated compositions but feature a ballad, dance and drama.

The character specific different styles of Sattriya have their own dress variations, and focus on the various life stages and activities of Radha, Krishna and the gopis.
