= Battle of Sualkuchi =

Conflict in Assam, northeastern India

- Part of Ahom–Mughal wars
Date	1636
Location	Sualkuchi, Assam 26.1703°N 91.5703°E
Result	Ahom victory
Territorial changes	Kamarupa is captured by the Ahoms

Belligerents
Ahom Kingdom	Mughal Empire

Commanders and leaders
Pratap Singha	Abdus Salam

Strength
10,000 men 60 ships	Unknown

Casualties and losses
Unknown	300 ships 160 swords 200 hand grenades
- The Ahoms seized hundreds of ships, firearms, and treasures from the Mughals.
- Location within South Asia Battle of Sualkuchi (Assam)

The Battle of Sualkuchi was a crucial conflict in the Ahom-Mughal wars of 1636, marking the resumption of hostilities after a 21-year hiatus. This renewed conflict saw the Ahom kingdom, under King Pratap Singha, intensify efforts to reclaim Kamarupa from Mughal control. Following a decisive naval victory at Srighat, where the Ahoms dealt a crushing blow to the Mughal fleet, the Ahoms shifted their focus to Sualkuchi, a strategic Mughal stronghold.

With a reinforced army of 10,000 archers and matchlock men supported by a fleet of sixty large ships, the Ahoms launched a concerted attack on Sualkuchi. Despite initial resistance, the Mughals suffered heavy losses, including warships, transport boats, and significant casualties. The victory at Sualkuchi allowed the Ahoms to secure substantial spoils, including hundreds of ships, firearms, and valuable treasures.

This triumph set the stage for further Ahom advances, including the capture of Hajo and key fortified outposts along the Brahmaputra. The battle underscored the effectiveness of Ahom military strategy and their ability to reclaim territories from the Mughals, consolidating Ahom sovereignty over Kamarupa.

== Background ==
The conflict between the Ahom kingdom and the Mughal Empire reignited in 1636 after a break of twenty-one years. In the intervening period, the Ahom rulers had extended support to groups opposed to Mughal rule, offering refuge to dissidents and backing rebellious chieftains and hill rulers in Kamrupa. This assistance included military aid, financial backing, and supplies, allowing the Ahoms to influence the ongoing power struggle in the region without engaging in direct confrontation. Hostilities intensified when Mughal subjects were killed within Ahom territory, and Pratap Singha declined to hand over Harikesh, a former Mughal revenue officer who had defected. In response, the Mughals sent troops to apprehend him, but their attempt ended in failure. This setback led Pratap Singha to launch a military campaign into areas under Mughal control.

[[File:Kamarupa-inscriptions-findspots.png|thumb|right|261px|

The findspots of inscriptions associated with the Kamarupa kingdom give an estimate of its geographical location and extent.]]

Seeking to strengthen his position, Pratap Singha aligned himself with frontier leaders from Dimarua, Hojai, and Barduar. Together, they launched assaults on Mughal outposts, including the strategic fort at Hajo. The Ahom forces triumphed in several battles, capturing a considerable amount of weaponry, including 360 cannons and firearms. To counter the Ahom advances, Abdus Salam, the Mughal governor of Hajo, sought reinforcements from Dacca. In response, a contingent arrived consisting of 1,000 cavalry, 1,000 musketeers, and 210 war sloops. With these additional troops, the Mughals managed to push back the Ahoms at Pandu and Srighat, forcing them into a brief withdrawal.

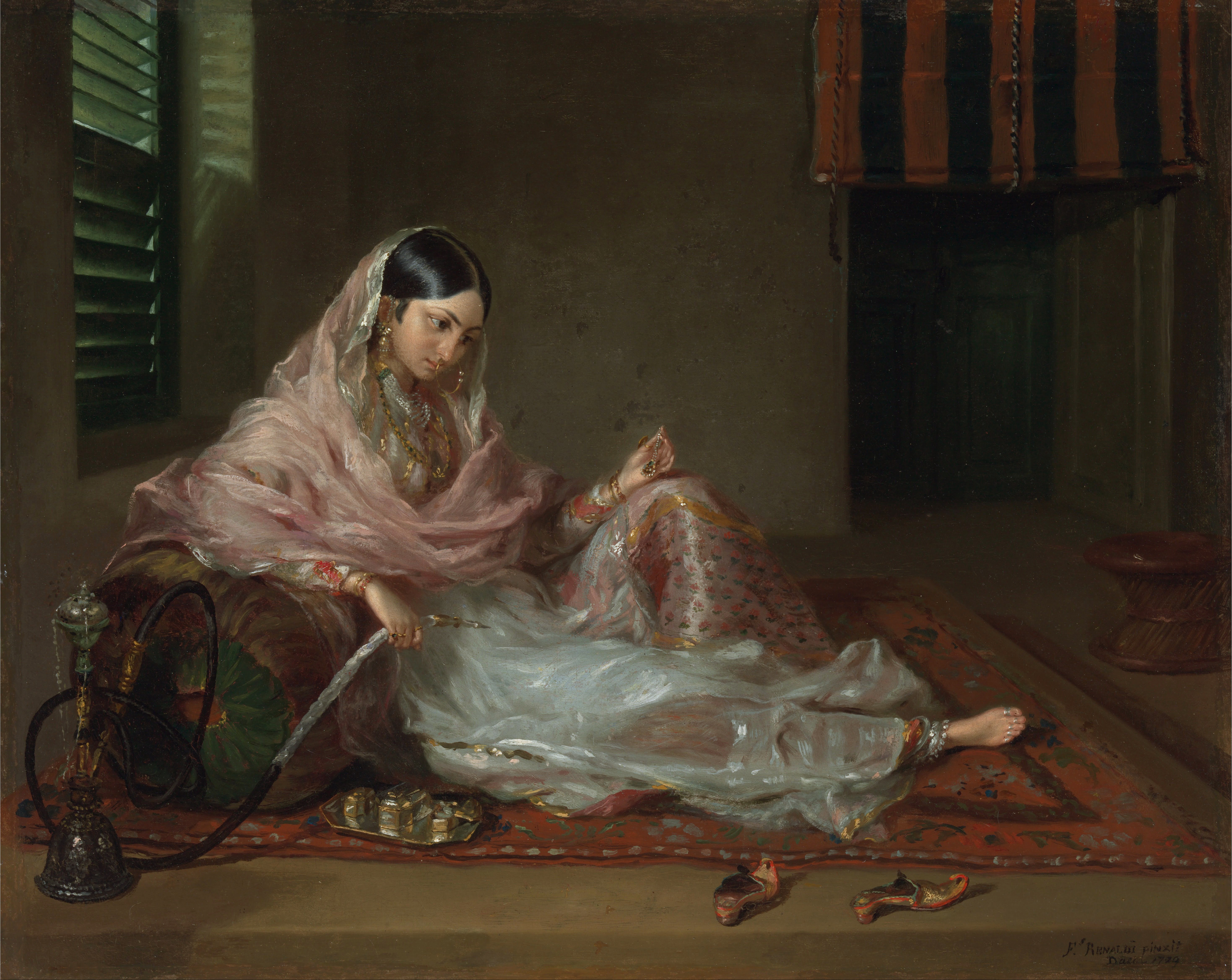
Woman draped in muslin and holding a hookah in Dhaka in 1789.

During the Battle of Srighat, the Ahoms turned the tide by launching an unexpected nighttime assault with a fleet of 500 vessels. The surprise attack caught the Mughal navy off guard, leading to a crushing defeat. The loss of Mughal officer Muhammad Salih and the capture of Majlis Bayazid further weakened the Mughal forces. The Ahoms seized seven ghrabs, thirty bachharis, and extensive war supplies, forcing the Mughals to retreat to Sualkuchi. The victory allowed the Ahoms to reclaim their stronghold at Agiathuti.

== Battle ==
With the Mughal forces weakened after their defeat at Srighat, Ahom ruler Pratap Singha saw an opportunity to reclaim Kamarupa. Setting his focus on Sualkuchi, he gathered a formidable army of 10,000 soldiers skilled in archery and matchlock firearms, supported by a fleet of sixty large warships, to launch the next offensive.

[[File:Weapons and firearms of Ahom kingdom.jpg|thumb|

Weapons of Ahom era.]]

Unable to withstand the Ahom offensive, the Mughals suffered a devastating defeat, losing a large number of warships, transport boats, and troops. The Ahoms claimed an immense haul of war spoils, seizing 300 ships, 160 swords, various firearms, 200 hand grenades, and a substantial amount of gold and silver.

== Aftermath ==
Building on their success at Sualkuchi, the Ahom forces, led by Barphukan and supported by Koch King Bali Narayan, set their sights on Hajo. Surrounding the city, they launched a siege that ultimately compelled Abdus Salam, the governor of Bengal, to surrender. With Hajo under their control, the Ahoms secured a wealth of spoils, including 200 firearms, nearly 5,000 swords, 700 horses, and an array of pearls and exquisite ornaments.

[[File:Map of Bengal, Behar, Orissa 1813.jpg|thumb|

Dhaka was the capital of the Mughal province of Bengal, Bihar and Orissa.]]

Subsequently, Bali Narayan, supported by 300 Koch and Assamese troops, captured Barnagar, a Mughal-aligned vassal state. He proceeded to attack Mughal outposts in the northwestern region of modern Kamarupa district, successfully occupying most of them.

[[File:Sunset in Dibrugarh.jpg|right|160px|thumb|

A view of sunset in the Brahmaputra from Dibrugarh.]]

Between March and December 1636, the Ahoms and Kamarupa rebels engaged in prolonged conflict, securing a series of major victories. While they encountered minor defeats near Pandu and Srighat, they ultimately overran all significant Mughal strongholds along both sides of the Brahmaputra, including Hajo, Pandu, and Srighat. These successes reinforced Ahom control over most of Kamarupa. Their coordination with the Koch kingdom proved instrumental in turning the tide against the Mughals.

== See also ==
- Battle of Bharali
- Battle of Samdhara
