= List of Monuments of National Importance in Assam =

This is a list of Monuments of National Importance (ASI) as officially recognized by and available through the website of the Archaeological Survey of India in the Indian state Assam. The monument identifier is a combination of the abbreviation of the subdivision of the list (state, ASI circle) and the numbering as published on the website of the ASI. 55 Monuments of National Importance have been recognized by the ASI in Assam.

== List of monuments of national importance ==
SL. No.	Description	Location	Address	District	Coordinates	Image
N-AS-1	Bordole temple	Biswanathghat		Biswanath	26°39′35″N 93°10′20″E	Bordole temple More images
N-AS-2	Grave of Lieutenant Lewis Van Sadan	Biswanathghat		Biswanath		Upload Photo
N-AS-3	Grave of Lieutenant Thomas Kennedy	Biswanathghat		Biswanath		Upload Photo
N-AS-4	Rock known as "Bishwanath Sivalinga"	Biswanathghat		Biswanath	26°39′41″N 93°10′30″E	Upload Photo
N-AS-5	Dhandi Temple	Dhandi (Gohpur)		Biswanath	26°51′00″N 93°41′56″E	Dhandi Temple More images
N-AS-6	The rock known as “Sakreswar”	The island “Unatumani” in the neighbourhood of village Bishwanath		Biswanath	26°39′42″N 93°10′36″E	The rock known as “Sakreswar” More images
N-AS-7	Ancient Caves/Tombs	Jogighopa		Bogaigaon	26°13′07″N 90°34′24″E	Upload Photo
N-AS-8	Cachari Ruins: A small unfinished dwelling house; Baradwari; East wall; Singh Darwazam; Temple of Ranahandi and 7&8 two small temples; Shan Mandir	Khaspur		Cachar	24°56′00″N 92°55′53″E	Cachari Ruins * A small unfinished dwelling house * Baradwari * East wall * Singh Darwazam * Temple of Ranahandi and 7&8 two small temples * Shan Mandir More images
N-AS-9	Group of four Maidams	Charaideo		Charaideo	26°56′37″N 94°52′36″E	Group of four Maidams More images
N-AS-10	Idgah on the Rangamati Hill with its enclose Walls and a space of 16’-20’ around there	Panbari (Rangamati Hill)		Dhubri	26°08′21″N 90°02′16″E	Idgah on the Rangamati Hill with its enclose Walls and a space of 16’-20’ around there More images
N-AS-11	Rangamati Mosque and the ablution tank attached thereto	Panbari (Rangamati Hill)		Dhubri	26°09′19″N 90°03′16″E	Rangamati Mosque and the ablution tank attached thereto More images
N-AS-12	The Derebara Group of monoliths	Dubungling		Dima Hasao	25°21′25″N 92°56′51″E	Upload Photo
N-AS-13	The Khartong Group of monoliths	Kartongsip		Dima Hasao	25°15′04″N 92°48′52″E	Upload Photo
N-AS-14	The Kobak Group monoliths	Khobak		Dima Hasao	25°16′45″N 92°48′52″E	The Kobak Group monoliths More images
N-AS-15	Rock-cut temple	Maibang		Dima Hasao	25°19′06″N 93°07′48″E	Rock-cut temple More images
N-AS-16	Two inscribed stones: on the treaty between the Dimasa King (Naranarayan) and the Ahom King.	Maibang		Dima Hasao	25°17′28″N 93°08′48″E	Two inscribed stones: on the treaty between the Dimasa King (Naranarayan) and the Ahom King. More images
N-AS-17	Bolosaon Group monoliths	Nuchubunglo		Dima Hasao		Upload Photo
N-AS-18	Tomb of Lieutenant Cresswell	Goalpara		Goalpara		Upload Photo
N-AS-19	Monument over the grave of Mr. B. J. Stow	Goalpara		Goalpara		Upload Photo
N-AS-20	Sri Suryapahar Ruins	Sri Suryapahar		Goalpara	26°06′24″N 90°42′23″E	Sri Suryapahar Ruins More images
N-AS-21	Monoliths	Kasomari Pathar		Golaghat	26°18′31″N 93°59′16″E	Monoliths More images
N-AS-22	Sivadol, Neghriting	Neghriting		Golaghat	26°44′05″N 94°00′17″E	Sivadol, Neghriting More images
N-AS-23	Stone inscription inside the "Powa Mecca Mosque"	Hajo		Kamrup	26°14′31″N 91°32′25″E	Stone inscription inside the "Powa Mecca Mosque" More images
N-AS-24	Shri Shri Hayagriva Madhava temple	Hajo		Kamrup	26°14′34″N 91°31′36″E	Shri Shri Hayagriva Madhava temple More images
N-AS-25	Shri Shri Kedar temple	Hajo		Kamrup	26°14′30″N 91°32′38″E	Shri Shri Kedar temple More images
N-AS-26	Shri Shri Ganesh temple	Hajo		Kamrup	26°14′10″N 91°32′02″E	Shri Shri Ganesh temple More images
N-AS-27	Shri Shri Kameshwar temple	Hajo		Kamrup	26°14′06″N 91°32′05″E	Shri Shri Kameshwar temple More images
N-AS-28	The Carvings, Inscriptions and pillar on the Urbasi Island	Guwahati		Kamrup (M)	26°11′38″N 91°44′42″E	Upload Photo
N-AS-29	The rock-cut sculpture representing Vishnu (with adjoining figures of Surya, Ganesa, Devi etc locally Known as Vishnu Janardhan	Guwahati		Kamrup (M)	26°11′17″N 91°44′27″E	The rock-cut sculpture representing Vishnu (with adjoining figures of Surya, Ganesa, Devi etc locally Known as Vishnu Janardhan More images
N-AS-30	Daurgarila Rock Inscription, Kamakhya Hill	Kamakhya Hill		Kamrup (M)	26°09′39″N 91°42′33″E	Daurgarila Rock Inscription, Kamakhya Hill More images
N-AS-31	Rock-cut figures and one Stone Gateway	Kamakhya Hill		Kamrup (M)		Rock-cut figures and one Stone Gateway
N-AS-32	Garhgaon Raja’s Palace	Garhgaon		Sivasagar	26°56′11″N 94°44′42″E	Garhgaon Raja’s Palace More images
N-AS-33	Bisnudol	Gaurisagar		Sivasagar	26°56′50″N 94°32′03″E	Bisnudol More images
N-AS-34	Devidol	Gaurisagar		Sivasagar	26°56′51″N 94°32′18″E	Devidol More images
N-AS-35	Gaurisagar Tank	Gaurisagar		Sivasagar	26°56′37″N 94°32′13″E	Gaurisagar Tank More images
N-AS-36	Sivadol	Gaurisagar		Sivasagar	26°56′50″N 94°32′08″E	Sivadol More images
N-AS-37	Bisnudol	Joysagar		Sivasagar	26°57′20″N 94°37′28″E	Bisnudol More images
N-AS-38	Devidol	Joysagar		Sivasagar	26°57′16″N 94°37′08″E	Devidol
N-AS-39	Eight Cannons of the Ahom period on the bank of the Sibsagar tank	Joysagar		Sivasagar	26°57′53″N 94°37′27″E	Eight Cannons of the Ahom period on the bank of the Sibsagar tank More images
N-AS-40	Ghanashyam's house	Joysagar		Sivasagar	26°57′01″N 94°37′05″E	Ghanashyam's house More images
N-AS-41	Gola Ghar or Magazine House	Joysagar		Sivasagar	26°57′51″N 94°37′20″E	Gola Ghar or Magazine House More images
N-AS-42	Rangnath Dol	Joysagar		Sivasagar	26°57′36″N 94°37′21″E	Rangnath Dol More images
N-AS-43	Rang Ghar Ruins	Joysagar		Sivasagar	26°58′01″N 94°37′09″E	Rang Ghar Ruins More images
N-AS-44	Sivadol	Joysagar		Sivasagar	26°57′20″N 94°37′17″E	Sivadol More images
N-AS-45	Kareng Ghar of the Ahom Kings (Talatal ghar)	Joysagar		Sivasagar	26°57′58″N 94°37′29″E	Kareng Ghar of the Ahom Kings (Talatal ghar) More images
N-AS-46	Bishnu dol	Sivasagar		Sivasagar	26°59′20″N 94°38′03″E	Bishnu dol More images
N-AS-47	Devidol	Sivasagar		Sivasagar	26°59′21″N 94°37′57″E	Devidol More images
N-AS-48	Siva dole	Sivasagar		Sivasagar	26°59′19″N 94°37′59″E	Siva dole More images
N-AS-49	Ruins, Singri Hill	Singri Hill		Sonitpur	26°37′30″N 92°29′12″E	Ruins, Singri Hill More images
N-AS-50	Masonry remains on the Bamuni Hills	Tezpur		Sonitpur	26°37′01″N 92°48′59″E	Masonry remains on the Bamuni Hills More images
N-AS-51	Sculptures in the Chummery compound(Chitralekha Udyan)	Tezpur		Sonitpur	26°37′05″N 92°47′38″E	Sculptures in the Chummery compound(Chitralekha Udyan)
N-AS-52	Mound and ruins of the stone temple, Dahparbatia	Dahparbatia		Sonitpur	26°37′53″N 92°45′27″E	Mound and ruins of the stone temple, Dahparbatia More images
N-AS-53	The rock on the bank of the Bharmaputra about 2 miles below Tezpur and the inscription thereon	Tezpur		Sonitpur	26°36′55″N 92°46′11″E	Upload Photo
N-AS-54	The gun of Emperor Sher Shah, Sadiya, Tinsukia	The circuit house of Chapakhowa Sadiya		Tinsukia		Upload Photo
N-AS-55	Two Swivel guns belonging to the Mughal Nawwara	The circuit house of Chapakhowa Sadiya		Tinsukia		Upload Photo

== See also ==
- List of Monuments of National Importance in India for other Monuments of National Importance in India
- List of State Protected Monuments in Assam
