= Battle of Bharali (1615) =

1615 battle of the Ahom-Mughal Wars

- Part of Ahom–Mughal wars
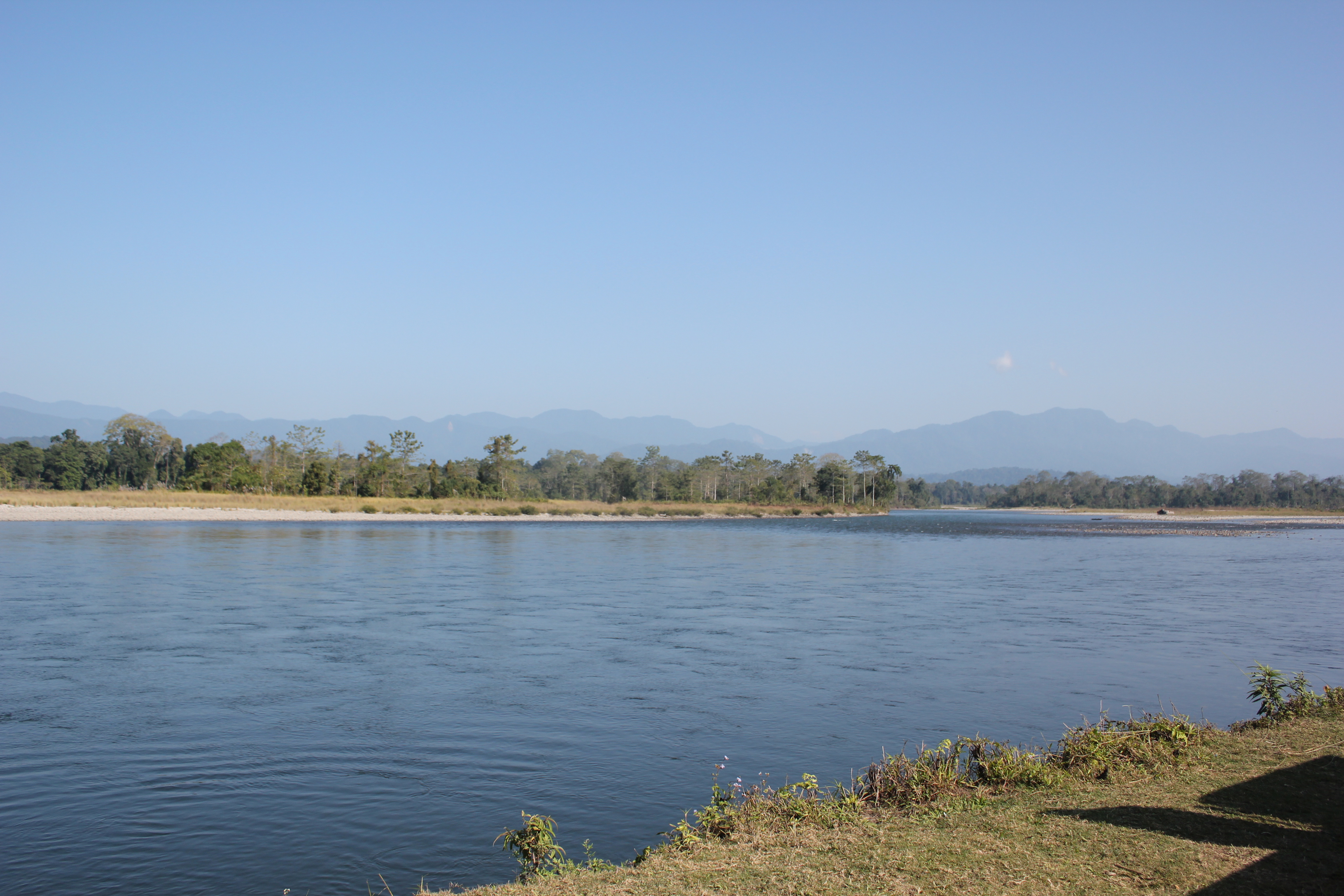
- A view of the Bharali River flowing through Nameri National Park in Assam.
Date	1615
Location	Bharali river, Assam 26.156°N 90.983°E
Result	Ahom victory

Belligerents
Ahom Kingdom	Mughal Empire: Bengal Subah

Commanders and leaders
Pratap Singh; Bali Narayan	Qasim Khan; Sayyid Abu Bakr †; Satrajit; Sayyid Hakim

Strength
Unknown	10,000 cavalry 400 ships Unknown amount of infantry

Casualties and losses
Unknown	5,000 killed 9,000 wounded 3,000 deserted
- Satrajit's son was sacrificed to the Goddess Kamakhya, according to prevalent Ahom rituals.
- Location within South Asia Battle of Bharali (Assam)

The Battle of Bharali, fought in 1615, was a significant conflict of the Ahom–Mughal wars, resulting in a decisive Ahom victory. Following the Mughal defeat, Bali Narayan was installed as the tributary Raja of Darrang, adopting the title Dharma Narayan and establishing his capital on the south bank of the Brahmaputra within the Darrang region. The loss led to the dismissal of Qasim Khan, the Subadar (provincial governor) of Bengal, highlighting the strategic and political repercussions of the battle.

== Background ==
In September 1613, Qasim Khan was appointed the subadar of Bengal, and he assumed the office in Dhaka on May 6, 1614. During Qasim Khan's tenure, a major rebellion broke out led by Shaikh Ibrahim, an imperial official accused of embezzling 7,00,000 rupees. To evade arrest, Ibrahim rebelled with 3,000 followers and sought assistance from the Raja of Assam. The Assamese ruler agreed to support Ibrahim with warboats and soldiers, promising him the territories of Kamarupa and Manchabat as rewards if he fought against the Mughals. The Ahom Kingdom in Assam, undergoing territorial expansion, inevitably clashed with the Mughals over the Assam-Bengal boundary

In 1606, regional powers like Raja Parikshit of the Eastern Koch Kingdom and the Mughal subadar of Bengal played crucial roles in shaping the political landscape. Raja Parikshit, who upheld the amicable ties with the Ahoms that his father, Raghu Dev, had established, continued to follow a policy of peaceful relations. This bond was further reinforced when a Koch princess was married to Pratap Singh. Meanwhile, the aging Ahom king Sukhampha concentrated on strengthening his frontiers, possibly offering support to Raghu Dev in his struggle against enemies along the western and southern borders.

At the same time, the Mughals, led by Mirza Yusuf, were assigned to defend the fort at Pandu, which soon became a key battleground. Baldev, the brother of Raja Parikshit, launched an attack on the fort with a force of 18,000 hillmen. Though Mirza Yusuf Barlas and his Mughal troops put up strong resistance, their defences weakened as they eventually ran out of gunpowder and lead. Baldev's troops pushed their trenches closer to the fort's ditch, forcing Mirza Nathan to request reinforcements. In response, Ghiyas-ud-din was ordered to march without delay, while Admiral Islam Quli of Bengal Subah was directed to offer naval support. Additionally, 200 matchlock men were dispatched to strengthen the garrison. Meanwhile, Baldev's forces intensified their assault, bombarding the fort with cannons and rockets. As Mirza Nathan's reinforcements reached Pandu, the garrison launched a counteroffensive, compelling Baldev to abandon the siege and withdraw. This event underscored the complex regional power struggles and reinforced Assam's strategic significance in the larger Mughal-Ahom conflict.

== Battle ==
Seeking to subdue the Ahoms, Qasim Khan, the Mughal governor of Bengal, organized a military expedition in 1615 as a pre-emptive strike--in response to escalating tensions, including the grant of refuge provided to Bali Narayan, the brother of Raja Parikshit, and the killing of a suspected Mughal spy near Koliabar. The two imperial commanders--Sayyid Hakim and Sayyid Abu Bakr were in charge of the expedition, leading 10,000 horsemen, an unspecified number of foot soldiers, and a group of 400 vessels. Accompanying them was Satrajit, the son of a landowner from the Dhaka region, who had earlier battled Raja Parikshit and aligned himself with the Mughals. He was assured the position of Thanadar (station chief) of Pandu and Guwahati as a reward.

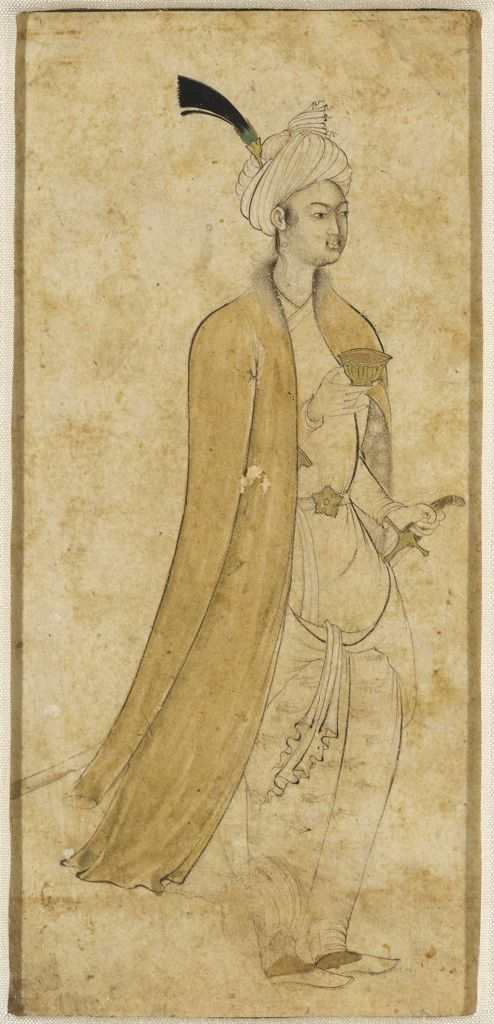
Qasim Khan Chishti

10,000 strong imperial contingent set its march, way to Kolibar by moving continuously through the Kallang River--thereby they came across Ahom army troops positioned surrounding the Bharali River's mouth. Using the thick fog to their benefit, the Mughals managed to get their cavalry across the river, catching the Ahoms off guard and emerging victorious in the first notable clash.

However, the Ahoms regrouped and launched a sudden night attack, a signature tactic of their military strategy. The assault inflicted heavy losses on the Mughals, including the death of their commander, Sayyid Abu Bakr. The Ahoms captured a large amount of booty during this counteroffensive, including elephants, horses, ships, cannons, and firearms. Additionally, Satrajit's son was sacrificed to the Goddess Kamakhya according to prevalent Ahom rituals.

Gait however mentions that the Mughal forces endured heavy losses, with thousands perishing, many more sustaining injuries, and a significant number abandoning their posts. It is said that Mughals sustained around 5,000 fatalities, 9,000 wounded, and 3,000 desertions. Although these estimates possibly include both military personnel and civilians. The engagement demonstrated the resilience and tactical ingenuity of the Ahoms in their conflict with the Mughal Empire. King Pratap Singha celebrated the victory with a triumphant return to the capital, where he performed the Rikkhvan ceremony, marking the culmination of the Ahom triumph.

== Aftermath ==
After the defeat of the Mughal forces, Bali Narayan was appointed as the vassal king of Darrang, where he was given the title Dharma Narayan. Bali Narayan's capital was situated on the southern banks of the Brahmaputra, within Darrang. After this defeat, Qasim Khan was dismissed from his role as the subadar of Bengal.

In November 1617, Pratap Singh, alongside Dharma Narayan, advanced with his army toward Hajo. During this campaign, the raja of Dimaura, a vassal under the Kacharis, and the ruler of Jaintia District, home to around 18,000 people, surrendered to Pratap Singh.

The Ahom army launched an assault and seized control of Pandu, dealing another blow to the Mughals, who suffered yet another defeat at Agiathuti. Forced to withdraw, the Mughals retreated to Hajo. These events marked a crucial triumph for the Ahoms in their ongoing struggle against the Mughal Empire.

== See also ==
- Ahom–Mughal wars
- Susenghphaa
- Battle of Samdhara
