= Balinarayan =

King of the Darrang Kingdom from 1616 to 1638

Balinarayan Dharmanarayan Baldeo
- Raja

1st King of Darrang
- Reign: 1616 CE to 1638
- Predecessor: Kingdom established by Susenphaa
- Successor: Mahendra Narayan
- Born: Koch Hajo
- Died: 1638; Singri
- Father: Raghu Dev
- Religion: Hinduism

Balinarayan alias Dharmanarayan or Baldeo (r. 1616– 1638) of Mughals was the son of Koch King Raghudev and younger brother of King Parikshit who was established as the first king of Darrang Desa (present-day Darrang) as a tributary by Ahom king Pratap Singha. He was the chief conductor of the operations conducted against the Mughals during their occupation of Kamrupa which was annexed to the Mughal domain after the defeat of the Koch Hajo kingdom.

== Career ==
=== Background ===
The Mughal governor of Bengal after subduing Koch Behar, invaded Koch Hajo. In the initial conflicts the King of Hajo, Parikshit got defeated and was captured, and taken to Delhi (1613). Balinarayan, Parikshit's younger brother fled to Ahom Kingdom and took shelter there under then Ahom King Pratap Singha (r. 1601– 1641) for protection. There he convinced Pratap Singha of his honesty by paying his full obeisances.

In 1615, Mughals launched their aggression towards Ahom Kingdom, with some initial success but at last ultimately crushed and pushed back off to Barnadi . Balinarayan was established by the Pratap Singha in the Darrang region as a tributary King.

Balinarayan was called Dharmanarayan by Pratap Singha due to his religious deposition.

=== Conflicts with Mughals ===
Mughal subjugation of Koch Hajo (Kamrupa) was incomplete and the latter could only effectively control the western part. Zealous, he was resolved to drive the Mughals out from Kamrupa and proved to be a noble tenacious fighter in both geographical divisions of Kamrup as Rana Pratap of Chittor.

In 1616, utilizing the weakening of the imperial authority in Kamrup, Balinarayan along the hill-chieftains besieged Pandu but the Mughal defeat was prevented by a Bengal zamindars who came to rescue and the besiegers retreated. In a second attempt, Balinarayan occupied Pandu without any contest due to an internal feud in the Mughal camp. He then called Ahom King for reinforcement for retention, who accordingly sent a large number of troops under his chief commanders, and a grand attack was launched upon Hajo. With initial gains, Mughals were reduced but were eventually compelled to retreat with the Burhagohain dead. Balinarayan escaped capture and took shelter in Ahom Kingdom.

In 1619, Balinarayan with Ahoms besieged Ranihat and captured it. Next year he made an attack on the Minari outpost but counter retaliation under Mirza Nathan, resulted in flight. Balinarayan (1626) seized Luki Duar and overrun the entirety of Dakhinkul (south bank of Brahmaputra ), attempts to subvert him proved abortive In 1636, Balinarayan captured the imperial strongholds of Nowmati. The Mughals after being defeated on several engagements now made their last stand on Hajo, now both Balinarayan and the Borphukan made a combined attack which eventually fell to them.

=== Death ===
The repeated news of reverse in Kamrup reached to Islam Khan II, Subahdar of Bengal and he sent strong reinforcement under Mir Zainuddin along with Allah Yar Khan. The reinforced Mughals now recovered the lost tracts one by one and finally captured Balinarayan at Singri; and killed.

== Legacy ==
Historian Sudhindra Nath Bhattacharya notes about Balinarayan –

"In fact, the history of Mughal Eamrup, subsequent to the year 1616, is one long tale of the persistent attempts made by Bali Narayan to subvert Imperial authority there... Almost every page of the Baharistan-i-Ghaibi attests to his skilful leadership, crafty strategy and military genius."

A life-sized statue of Balinarayan alias Dharamanarayan was unveiled in Mangaldoi, Darrang district.

== See also ==
- Ahom Dynasty
- Battle of Samdhara
- Ahom–Mughal conflicts
- Mughal Empire
- Ahom kingdom
- Koch-Ahom conflicts

== Notes ==
Balinarayan Darrang Kingdom
Regnal titles
Preceded by Position established	Raja	Succeeded by Mahendra Narayan
