= Koch Hajo =

Indian kingdom (1581–1613)

- 1581–1613
- Capital: Hajo; Bijni; Dumuria; Jogighopa; Abhayapuri
- Government
- Maharaja
  - 1581–1603: Raghudev
  - 1603–1613: Parikshit Narayan
- History
  - Established by Raghudev: 1581
  - Mughal conquest of Kamrup: 1613
Succeeded by
Mughal Empire
- Today part of: India

Koch Hajo (1581–1613) was the kingdom under Raghudev and his son Parikshit Narayan of the Koch dynasty that stretched from Sankosh River in the west to the Bhareli River in the east on the north bank of the Brahmaputra River. It was created by dividing the Kamata kingdom then under Nara Narayan in medieval Assam. The Sankosh River divided the two new kingdoms, and it is roughly the boundary between the present-day Indian states of Assam and West Bengal. The western half of the Kamata kingdom emerged as Koch Bihar whereas the eastern half emerged as Koch Hajo. The name Hajo comes from the legendary king Hajo, a Koch tribal chief and an ancestor of the Koch dynasty, who ruled over the Rangpur division in present-day Bangladesh and some regions of present-day Assam.

== Division of Kamata kingdom ==
After the Koch–Ahom conflicts that saw Chilarai briefly occupy Garhgaon, the capital of the Ahom kingdom, Koch rule was consolidated between the Sankosh River in the west and the Subansiri River on the east under the governorship of Chilarai. Chilarai's son, Raghudev, was the heir apparent to the childless Nara Narayan. A son (Lakshmi Narayan) born late to Nara Narayan dashed Raghudev's hopes of becoming the king. Raghudev, accompanied by some trusted state officers, traveled east on a purported hunting trip and declared himself king of the eastern portion at a place called Barnagar near the Manas River. Nara Narayana did not react aggressively, and the kingdom was divided amicably with Raghudev promising to pay an annual tribute. This division occurred in 1581. When Nara Narayan died in 1587, Raghudev stopped paying tribute and declared himself independent.

=== Koch Hajo territory ===
The kingdom under Raghudev included the region between Sankosh and Bhareli rivers on the northern bank of the Brahmaputra River, and on the south the region west of the Kalang-Kopili River that followed the course of the Brahmaputra as it bends south and right up to the forests of Mymensingh region, now in Bangladesh.

== Raghudev Narayan ==
Raghudev's declaration of independence established a Koch Bihar-Koch Hajo conflict that was to result in Koch Bihar losing its independence to the Mughal Empire and Koch Hajo losing its very existence both within three decades. Lakshmi Narayan tried to instigate Parikshit, a son of Raghudev, against his father. The plot was detected and Parikshit managed to escape to Koch Bihar. This led to an armed conflict between the two kingdoms, but which maintained the status quo.

The first major defeat for Raghudev was at the hands of Isa Khan, an Afghan chief from Mymensingh. Raghudev fortified Jangalbari in Mymensingh, but ultimately lost the region south of Rangamati sometime before 1594. After Man Singh became the Subahdar of the Mughal Empire for Bengal in 1594 he led a campaign against Isa Khan and took possession of his territories; and when Isa Khan and others rallied the next year in 1596 they were effectively by Himmat Singh the son of Man Singh, forcing Isa Khan to ally with Raghudev. Raghudev, with the help of Isa Khan, attacked Bahirbandh in Koch Bihar, and Lakshmi Narayan submitted on his own accord to vassalage of the Mughal Empire. Under these circumstances, Raghudev transferred his capital from Barnagar to North Guwahati.

The Koch Bihar-Mughal alliance defeated Raghudev in May 1597, but in the same year Raghudev was able to recoup his losses with the help of Isa Khan. Isa Khan, who was able to rout the Mughal army and kill its commander Durjan Singh, a son of Man Singh I of Amber, released the war prisoners and himself submitted himself to Akbar.

Having lost the alliance of Isa Khan, Raghudev was then forced to forge an alliance with the Ahom kingdom. Raghudev offered his daughter Mangaldoi to Prataap Singha in 1603, and the Ahom king accepted on the possibility of using Raghudev as a buffer against the Mughals. But this did not happen because Raghudev died within the same year after the marriage between Pratap Singha and Mangaldoi.

== Parikshit Narayan ==
Parikshit the eldest son of Raghudev returned to the capital in 1603 to stake his claim to the kingdom. In the war of succession that followed, Man Singha, a son of Raghudev was offered refuge in Namrup by the Ahom king. Though Parikshit had earlier taken shelter with Lakshminarayan against his father Raghudev, he invaded Bahirbandh, a region under Koch Bihar and occupied it sometime between 1603 and 1608; and in the ensuing negotiations, won back the royal insignia that Raghudev had earlier lost to Lakhsminarayan. Lakshmi Narayan saw no recourse but to submit in person to Islam Khan in 1609. Parikshit could ward off the first Mughal expedition under Abdul Wahid.

The second expedition under Mukarram Khan was massive. He tried to enlist the Ahoms into the war but was unsuccessful.

=== Mughal—Koch Hajo War ===
The Mughal army and navy began its expedition from near Dhaka in the July 1612.

== Mughal rule ==
Since the declaration of independence, the rulers of Koch Hajo and the rulers of Koch Bihar have maintained hostilities against each other. The Subahdar of Bengal, Islam Khan I, led an expedition into Hajo alongside the Amil of Sylhet, Muhammad Zaman Karori of Tehran in the early 17th century. In 1602 the Nawab of Dhaka (governor for the Mughals) moved by Lakshmi Narayan (ruler of Koch Bihar) and others attacked Parikshit Narayan, the ruler of Koch Hajo. Parikshit, defeated at Dhubri, sued for peace. But he soon continued with the hostilities and in 1614 was driven up to Pandu, now in Guwahati. Here, Parikshit surrendered and agreed to become a vassal of the Mughal Empire. But before he could take up this assignment he died. The Mughals then appointed Kabisekhar as the Qanungoh and instructed Sheikh Ibrahim Karori to set up a Mughal system of administration. The Mughals appointed Bijit Narayan, son of Parikshit Narayan, as the zamindar of the region between river Sankosh and Manas, and he became the founder of the Bijni branch of the Koch royal family which finally settled in Abhayapuri. In 1657, Lutfullah Shirazi, the faujdar of Shujabad, built the hilltop mosque in Hajo known as Powa-Makkah Barmaqam.

=== Mughal divisions ===
The Mughal divided the kingdom of Koch Hajo into four sarkars. They were:

1. Uttarkol or Dhekeri, north of the Brahmaputra.
2. Dakhinkol, south of Brahmaputra.
3. Kamrup (or Shujabad), containing Guwahati and Hajo.
4. Bangalahbhumi, containing Bahirbund and Bhitarbund.

The four sarkars were further divided into parganas, and traces of this revenue system exists till today.

The Mughal influence in Kamrup ended in 1682. The Mughal political influence on Koch Hajo lasted for eighty years.

== Darrang ==
With the Mughals reaching the doorsteps of the Ahoms, hostilities ensued. These finally led to a large Mughal army attacking the Ahom kingdom from 1615 to 1616. On January 27, 1616, the Ahoms, under the king Pratap Singha, attacked the Mughals before dawn and massacred a major portion of the Mughal army. The Ahoms defeated the Mughals in the Bharali war and re-occupied Darrang from the Mughals. After the region was cleared of the Mughals, Pratap Singha established Balinarayan, the brother of Parikshit Narayan, as the Raja of Darrang. The intention of Pratap Singha in installing Balinarayan as a tributary king of Darrang was to create a buffer state between Ahom kingdom and Mughal Empire. Pratap Singha sent many gifts to the newly installed Koch prince Bali Narayan as well as a new wife and even a new name (Dharmanarayan), implying that the Darrangi King was to remain subservient to the Ahom king.

This Balinarayan had nothing to do with Raghudeva brother of Lakhsminarayan of Koch Bihar. The Ahoms, with the help of Bali Narayan, then moved against the remnant of the Mughals ruling in Hajo. After many battles the Ahoms and Bali Narayan's army finally conquered Hajo and removed their influence from Goalpara. Bali Narayan began his rule from Hajo.

This did not last for long and the Mughals maintained their attack on Koch Hajo. Beginning with 1637 the Ahoms faced a number of reverses, including the death of Balinarayan in Singari battle in 1638. His son ascended the throne and became the king of Darrang (excluding Tezpur). On the other hand, the Ahoms ruled the eastern part of Darrang (the present Sonitpur) through Kalia Bhomora Borphukan, stationed at Kaliabor. In 1639 by the Treaty of Asurar Ali between the Ahom general Momai Tamuli Borbarua and the Mughal commander Allahyar Khan the river Barnadi was fixed as the boundary between the Mughal empire and the Ahom kingdom. Darrang remained with the Ahoms ruled by Mahendra Narayan, son of Bali Narayan. Mahendra Narayan was succeeded by Chandra Narayan and then by Surya Narayan.

== Kamrup ==
Following the war of succession after Shah Jahan in 1657, the Ahoms reoccupied Kamrup. Again, this possession did not last long. In 1662 the Mughal general Mir Jumla marched up to Gargaon, the Ahom capital, and set up camp. But he could not consolidate Mughal rule in the region. Nevertheless, he struck an agreement with the Ahom king that included war indemnities; but he died on his journey back to Dhaka. The Ahoms again captured Kamrup in 1667, and fended off an entrenched Mughal attack led by Ram Singh in 1671 in the celebrated Battle of Saraighat. In March 1679, the Ahom viceroy in Guwahati, Laluksola Borphukan, handed over Kamrup to Nawab Mansur Khan, the deputy of Azam Shah, the son of Aurangzeb and the then governor of Bengal.

Mansur Khan attacked Darrang in 1682, captured Surya Narayan and installed his 5-year-old brother as the ruler of Darrang. But that influence did not last for long. In that year itself, the Ahoms, under the kingship of Gadadhar Singha, attacked Kamrup and removed the Mughals for good. In the meantime, the influence of the Raja of Darrang decreased, and the Ahoms took possession of Kamrup till the end of their rule.

== Bijni ==
The Bijni branch of the Koch dynasty controlled its feudatory from the present-day Bijni town from 1671 till 1864 when it was attacked by Jhawlia Mech, a chieftain from Bhutan. This resulted in the capital moving to Dumuria. The earthquake of 1897 destroyed the royal palaces and the capital moved again, first to Jogighopa and then finally to Abhayapuri in 1901. The control of the Bijni branch ended after the Indian government took direct control of the region in 1956.

== See also ==
- Koch Rajbongshi people
- Kamrup region
