= Singri =

Singri may refer to:

== Places ==
- Singri, village in Assam
- Singirikudi, village in Tamil Nadu
