= Chalantapara =

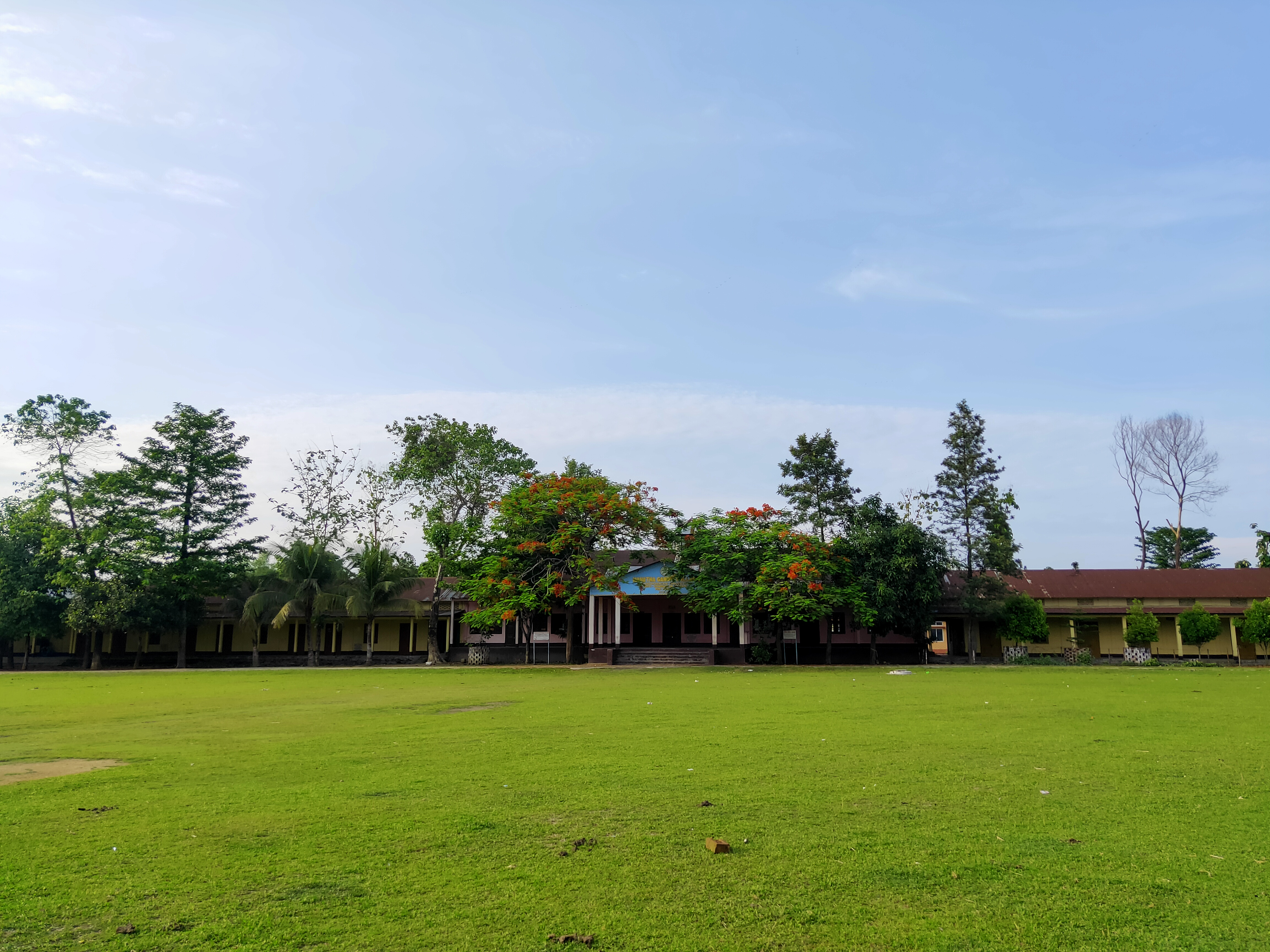
Chalantapara

Chalantapara is a small town in the district of Bongaigaon, sub-division of Abhayapuri, in the state of Assam, India. It is around 30 kilometres (19 mi) from Bongaigaon City and forms a part of Boitamari Development block. The Brahmaputra River is just 4 km away from Chalantapara.

Chalantapara M.V. School is one of the oldest schools situated in Chalantapara. St. Xavier School in Chalantapara provides the primary and secondary education under CBSE board in India. Chalantapara Higher Secondary School is an institute, which provides the secondary and high school education in that locality under Board of Secondary Education, Assam, and Higher Secondary Education under Assam Higher Secondary Education Council. Mahatma Gandhi College is a college that is providing graduation course in arts.

PIN (Postal index Number) for Chalantapara is 783388. Chalantapara MPHC the only health centre in the radius of almost 3 km. There is a veterinary hospital present for the treatment of animals.
