= Rajbari, Abhayapuri =

Rajbari is the royal palace, and capital of the king of Bijni in what is today Assam State, India. The Rajbari palace was the third capital of the Bijni kingdom of Koch Hajo.

The first capital of Bijni Kingdom was at modem Bijni town (1671 to 1864). The capital shifted to Dumuria (now known as Dalan Bhanga) due to an attack by Jhawlia Mech – a local chief under the Bhutan Kingdom. The earthquake of 12 June 1897 severely damaged the royal palaces in Dumuria, necessitating the shifting of the capital temporarily to Jogighopa.

The capital was finally moved to the Deohati forest area, now known as Abhayapuri in 1901. In 1956, the kingdom officially joined the Union of India.
