= Battle of Samdhara =

Battle between Mughals and Ahoms in 1616

- Part of Ahom-Mughal conflicts
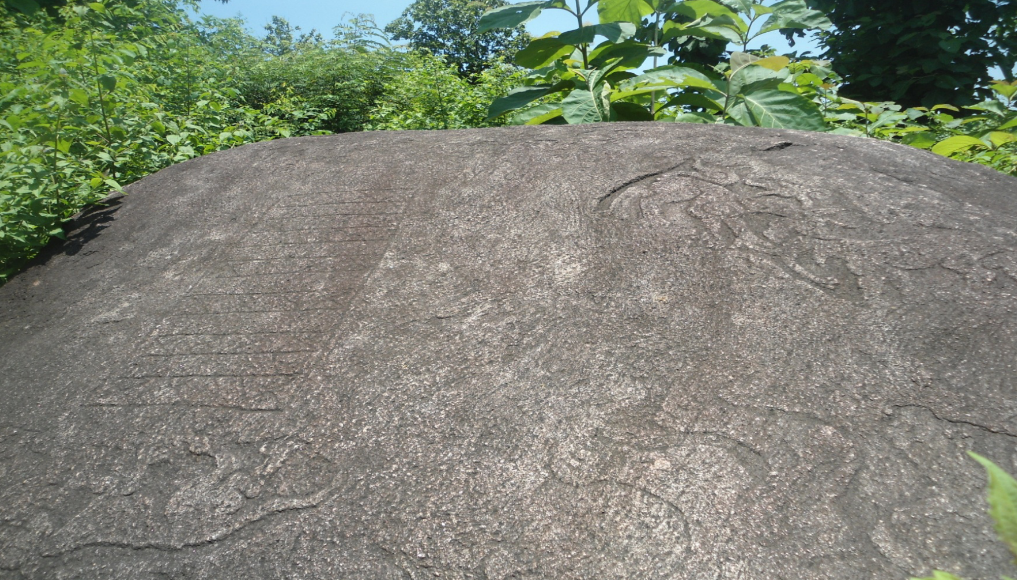
- Bhomoraguri Rock inscription 1616, commemorating the victory of Ahoms over the Mughals in Samdhara
Date	January 1616
Location	Samdhara, Assam
Result	Ahom victory

Belligerents
Ahom kingdom	Mughal Empire: Bengal Subah

Commanders and leaders
Pratap Singha; Shamkula Borgohain; Lasham Charing Gohain; Ailas Gohain; Lama Barua; Chepta Barua; Langu Deoghria; Bharali Barua; Piksai Hazarika	Qasim Khan Chishti; Syed Hakkim khan Syed Aba bakr †; Sattrajit; Raja Jagdeo; Jamal khan kankali †; Gokul Chand †; Miran Sayed Masud (POW); Ilahdad Khan Dakhini (POW); Raja Rai (POW); Karamchand (POW)

Strength
30,000 men 700 war elephants	10,000 troops 10,000 cavalry 400 war boats 2,000 musketeers

Casualties and losses
Light	1,700 killed

Battle of Samdhara was the first naval battle fought between Mughals and the Ahoms in 1616.

== Background ==
The first direct clash of arms between the Ahoms and Mughals was occasioned by an illegal trade-affair carried by a merchant, Ranta or Ratan Shah by name, who was procuring aloes-wood for Jahangir, at Singri, that lay to the east of the Barnadi and within the Ahom kingdom. On detection, his goods were confiscated and he was expelled from the Ahom territory. Shortly afterwards, unauthorised merchants of Bengal were found to the north of Kajali buying pulses, mustard seeds, and other commodities. Two such merchant vessels were seized by the Ahom government and two of the tradesmen killed. The incident of killing the merchants was only a pretext to launch an invasion to Assam, the Mughal viceroy had long preparing for an invasion.

== Expedition ==
This stern action of the Ahom government was taken exception to by the Mughal government in Bengal, which was further dissatisfied with the Ahom king Pratap Singha for sheltering Balinarayan, brother of Parikshit. Seikh Qasim Khan, the governor of Bengal, sent immediately a force consisting of over 10,000 troops, and 300 well-equipped war-boats, under Syed Hakkim and Syed Aba Bakr. Sattrajit, son of the zamindar of Bhusna near Dacca, who had earlier fought successfully against Parikshit and had been rewarded by his appointment as thanadar of Pandu and Guahati, also accompanied the expeditionary force. Beside, some noted officers of the central government like Raja Jagdeo, grandson of Raja Todar Mal, Jamal Khan Mankali accompanied Aba Bakr. The expeditionary force started from Bajrapur in Bengal in March 1616 and reached the mouth of the Kalang river in the midst of rains in May/June of that year. The Ahom fleet stationed at the Kajali Choucki attacked the invading force but suffered defeat and retreated with the loss of some boats. Elated at this victory, Sattrajit entered Sala by way of the Kalang, killed a few men and looted a royal store. After three days, he crossed the Brahmaputra, moved westward and carried away three female dancers from the Siva temple at Biswanath and sailed off.

== Battle ==
Qasim Khan's campaign to extend Mughal control over Assam culminated in a major expedition led by Sayyid Aba Bakr. This force, consisting of 10,000–12,000 cavalry and infantry, 200 musketeers, and 300–400 warboats, was accompanied by 1,500 imperial officers, including prominent figures like Raja Satrajit of Bhusna and Jamal Khan Mankali. The Mughal forces advanced into Ahom territory, capturing key forts at Kajali, Kalang, Kalibar, and Sala, while also looting the Bishwanath Temple and seizing Ahom royal treasures.

In response, the Ahoms fortified Samdhara, a strategically located fort near the confluence of the Bharali and Brahmaputra rivers. The Burhagohain, Bargohain, and Barpatragohain led efforts to reinforce the fort with 14,000 additional troops. Meanwhile, Ahkek Gohain, a former defector who returned to the Ahom side under a promise of pardon, provided critical intelligence about Mughal movements. The Mughals eventually stationed themselves on the Bharali's right bank, opposite Samdhara.

The Ahoms, after consulting astrologers, planned a surprise night attack for January 1616. Exploiting the unpreparedness of the Mughals, the Ahom forces launched a devastating offensive, quickly overpowering their enemy. Key Mughal commanders, including Sayyid Aba Bakr, Jamal Khan Kankali, and Gokul Chand, were slain, along with 1,700 Mughal soldiers. The Mughal fleet initially resisted but collapsed after the death of Aba Bakr. The Ahoms captured almost the entire Mughal flotilla, including its commander Miran Sayed Masud, while Satrajit and Sona Ghazi narrowly escaped with two boats. Many Mughal officers, including Ilahdad Khan Dakhini, Raja Rai, and Karamchand, were taken prisoner.

Ahom spies played a crucial role in the victory by exposing weaknesses in the Mughal defenses, including poorly fortified camps and uncleared jungles. The Ahoms used this intelligence to clear the jungle and prepare for their assault, catching the Mughals by surprise. Following the victory, the Ahoms captured vast war resources, including elephants, horses, guns, and ammunition.

King Pratap Singha, upon hearing of the triumph at Samdhara, ordered that the captured Mughal officers be spared, as he wished to see them personally. However, most of the prisoners were already slain by the time he arrived. Enraged, Pratap Singha ordered the execution of the Ahom officers responsible for killing the captives. To commemorate the victory, Pratap Singha constructed a new fort at Samdhara and inscribed the achievement as Visama Samara Vijayana (Victory in Unequal Battle). This marked a decisive moment in the Ahom-Mughal conflict, showcasing the resilience and military strategy of the Ahoms.

== Aftermath ==
Thus the maiden attempt of the Mughals to expand towards the east was successfully thwarted by the Ahoms. This defeat brought both ignominy and disaster to the Mughals. Qasim Khan was replaced by Ibrahim Khan Fathjang as the governor of Bengal in April 1617 and Lakshmi Narayan, who has been placed in detention for three years, was re-installed in his kingdom on the condition that he would serve the cause of the Mughals in their fight against the Ahoms. On the Ahom side, this victory greatly increased their prestige and solidified their position as the master-power of modern north-east India. It was at this time that they brought under their control the entire tract between the Barnadi and the Bharali. Pratap Singha, the Ahom king, established Balinarayan as the tributary raja of Darrang and renamed him as Dharmanarayan. Many of the captured soldiers and commanders were sacrificed to goddess Kamakhya in Kamakhya Temple, including the captured son of Sattrajit.

== See also ==
- Ahom Dynasty
- Ahom kingdom
- Ahom–Mughal conflicts
- Battle of Saraighat
