= Surampha =

Suramphaa
- Chaopha Swargadeo of Ahom Kingdom

Ahom King
- Reign: 1641 CE to 1644 CE
- Predecessor: Susenghphaa
- Successor: Sutingphaa
- Born: Ahom kingdom
- Died: c. 1644; Ahom kingdom
Names
- Bhoga Roja Jayaditiya Singha
- Dynasty: Ahom dynasty
- Father: Susenghphaa
- Religion: Ahom religion; Hinduism

Surampha (1641–1644) was a king of the Ahom kingdom. Due to his moral disposition, which was severely lacking, he is referred to as the bhoga roja in the Buranjis.

== Accession and decline ==
Surampha, one of the three eligible sons of the previous Ahom king, Susenghpha (Pratap Singha), acceded the Ahom throne in alliance with Sutingpha against Sai, both of whom were his brothers. Due to his scandalous life, as well as the depredations of an adopted son who he announced as heir apparent, the Ahom nobles deposed and poisoned him and installed Sutingpha as the king.
