= Abhayapuri =

- Town
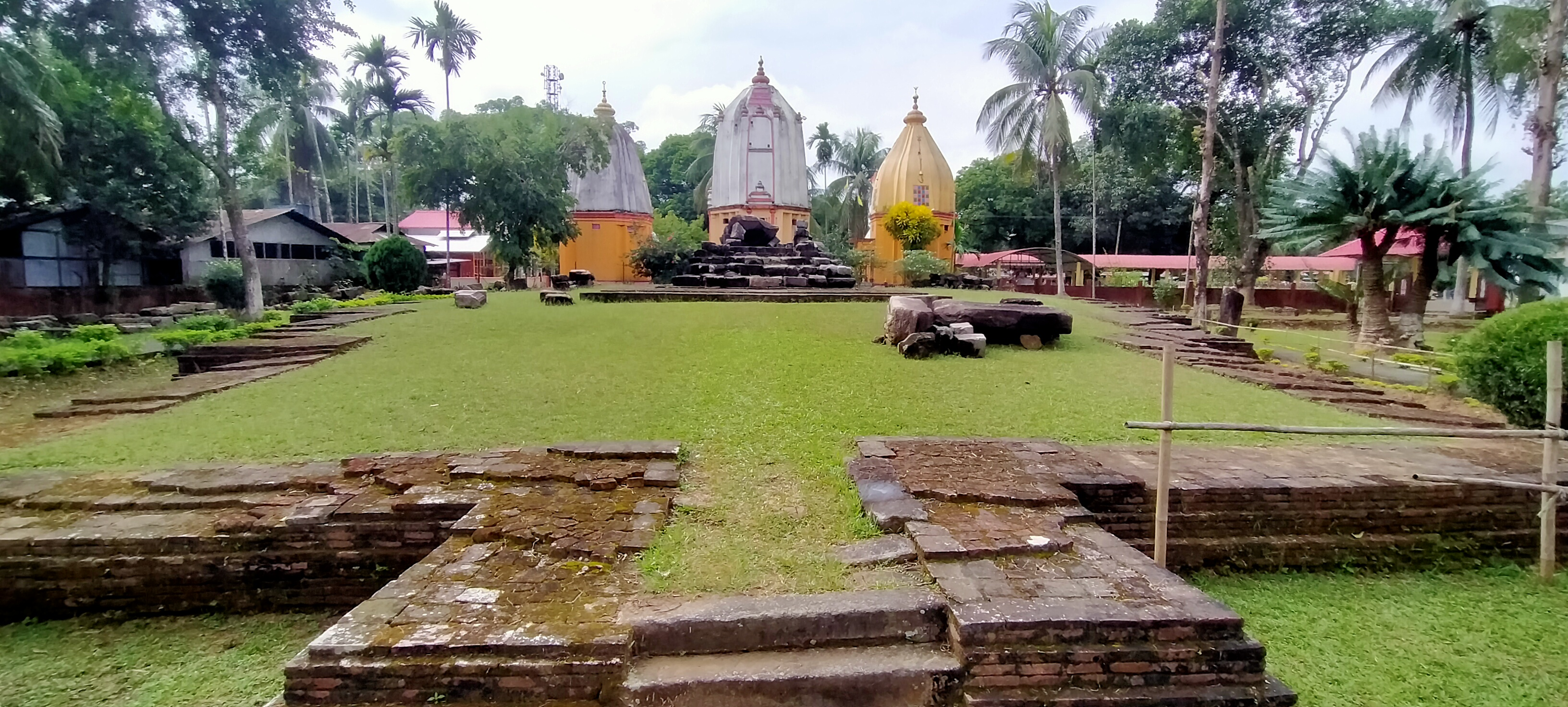
- Ganesh Mandir Abhayapuri
- Nickname: Devadaru Nagari
- Location in Assam, India Abhayapuri (India)
- Coordinates: 26.33°N 90.87°E
- Country: India
- State: Assam
- District: Bongaigaon

Government
  - Type: Mayor-council government
  - Body: Abhayapuri Town Committee
  - Mayor: Ramendra Narayan Banikya (Bharatiya Janata Party)
- Elevation: 36 m (118 ft)

Population (2001)
  - Total: 14,671

Languages
  - Official: Assamese
- Time zone: UTC+5:30 (IST)
- Postal code: 783384
- Vehicle registration: AS 19

Abhayapuri (IPA: /ɔ.bʱɔ.ja.pu.ɹi/ or alternatively /ə.bʱə.jaː.pu.ɾiː/) is a town in the Bongaigaon district and 21 km away from Bongaigaon town. It is the headquarters of the North Salmara sub-division. It is surrounded by natural forests and hills, and is located on National Highway 31, about 200 km west of Guwahati. Its nearest airport is at Azara, Guwahati and Rupsi and its nearest railway station is Abhayapuri Railway Station.

== History ==
Abhayapuri was the third capital (after 1897) of the Bijni kingdom that was established by king Bijit Narayan alias Chandra Narayan in 1671. Bijit Narayan was the son of Parikshit Narayan who was the grandson of Sukladhwaj alias Chilarai, the Koch general and the younger brother of Nara Narayan, the ruler of Koch dynasty of Kamata Kingdom in the 16th century.

The first capital of Bijni kingdom was located at modern Bijni town (1671–1864), but it was later shifted to Dumuria (now known as Dalan Bhanga) when attacked by Jhawlia Mech and (a local chief under Bhutan Kingdom). The Assam earthquake of 1897 disfigured the royal palaces of Dumuria which led to the Queen Abhayeswari Devi (the widow and second queen of Raja Kumud Narayan Bhup Bahadur) who was the then ruler of Bijni to shift the capital to the Deohati forest area which was later renamed as Abhayapuri after Devi Abhoyamata, the family deity of the ruling dynasty. In 1956, during the rule of Raja Bhairabendra Narayan, the kingdom officially joined the Union of India.

=== Bijni Kingdom ===
The Bijni Kingdom was situated between 250 53' and 260 32' N. and 900 85' and 910 85' E. The estate was in possession of the Bijni family, descended from the Koch king Nara Narayan, who reigned over Kamata kingdom from 1534 to 1584. Before his death, Nara Narayana allowed his kingdom to be divided between his son Lakshmi Narayan and his nephew Raghu Rai (son of Chilarai). Raghu Rai established his capital at Barnagar in Barpeta (now a district in Assam), and received as his share the Koch territories lying to the east of Sankosh River.

After the death of Nara Narayan in 1584, Raghu Rai declared independence. The eastern kingdom ruled by Raghu Rai came to be called Koch Hajo and the western Koch Bihar. Soon after the declaration of independence, the two kingdoms started displaying hostilities against each other. Raghu Rai was succeeded by his son Parikshit Narayan and was defeated in 1602 by the army of Nawab of Dhaka (governor for the Mughals) who was moved by Lakshmi Narayan (ruler of Koch Bihar). Parikshit was defeated at Dhubri (now a district in Assam) and sued for peace. But soon, he continued with the hostilities and in 1614 was driven up to Pandu, now in Guwahati. There, Parikshit surrendered and agreed to become a vassal of the Mughal Empire. But before he could take up this assignment he died. The Mughals then appointed Kabisekhar as the kanungo and instructed Sheikh Ibrahim Karori to set up a Mughal system of administration. Parikshit' son Bijit Narayan, was confirmed by the Mughals as 'zamindar' of the area between the Manas River and the Sankosh River and from him the Bijni family descended. The name "Bijni", now a sub-division of Chirang district of Bodoland Territorial Area in Assam, comes from the name of the king Bijit Narayan.

Under the Mughal rule, the Bijni king Bijit Narayan paid a tribute of Rs. 5,998 which was afterward commuted to an annual delivery of 68 elephants. During the last two decades of the 17th century, the Mughals lost their influence on Assam while the East India Company gradually started strengthening their foothold in different parts of India including Bengal.

The East India Company was awarded the 'diwani' or overlordship of Bengal by the empire following the Battle of Buxar in 1764 and the company came to an agreement (known as Permanent Settlement) with Bengali landlords in 1793 to fix revenues to be raised from land. With the Treaty of Yandaboo in 1826, the East India Company finally took control of Upper Assam. However, it was doubtful whether Goalpara was ever included in the Permanent Settlement. According to The Imperial Gazetteer of India, a small assessment from the Bijni kingdom was always accepted in lieu of land revenue, though it has sometimes been argued it was nothing more than a tribute. The Imperial Gazetteer of India, which was published in 1902, states that the Bijni family paid a revenue of Rs. 1,500 and cesses amounting to nearly Rs. 19,000 for an estate which covered an area of 950 square miles (2,500 km^{2}) with an estimated rent-roll of Rs. 2 lakh.

On the conclusion of the Bhutan war (or Duar War) fought between British India and Bhutan in 1864–1865, the Bijni family put forward claims to hold a large tract of land in the Eastern Duar which they alleged that they were in possession under the Bhutan government. The claim was admitted and in 1870 a settlement was effected with the Court of Wards on behalf of the minor Bijni Raja. The present extent of the estate to which they were entitled was still matter of uncertainty, but in 1882 it was ruled by the government of India that the Raja should receive 130,000 acres (530 km^{2}) of land. These estates generally remained under the direct management of the government, who allowed to the Raja 7.5 percent of the collections as his share of profits.

==== Rulers of Abhayapuri (Bijni Kingdom) ====
- Bijit Narayan (alias Chandra Narayan)
- Joy Narayan
- Shiv Narayan
- Bijoy Narayan
- Mukunda Narayan
- Haridev Narayan
- Indra Narayan
- Amrit Narayan
- Kumud Narayan
- Abhayeswari Devi
- Jogendra Narayan
- Bhairabendra Narayan

==== Archaeological Monuments ====
The Lalmati-Duramari Ganesh Temple near Abhayapuri, is one of the oldest temples in Assam. The historical authenticity of the images are yet to be ascertained. Based on the study of the stone carvings and modes related to the carved idols, some archaeologists has opined that the temple and images belong to 8th to 10th century. The existence of ruins in Lalmati-Durgamari area along with temples was brought to the notice of the Historical & Antiquarian Department of the Govt. of Assam in 1974. The department undertook excavation work which resulted the discovery of the temples, images and idols of gods and goddesses.

The Lungai Pahar Shiva Temple is located 10 km away from the main town of Abhayapuri. There are 227 steps on the stairway to the temple. Inside which there are stone carvings of Lord Shiva, Lord Ganesha and Goddess Kali.

Rajbari, Abhayapuri is the palace of the erstwhile king of Abhayapuri Kingdom.

== People and culture ==
Since time immemorial, Koch(belonging to Indo-Mongoloid ethnic group of people) have been living in this area now known as Abhayapuri.

Nath Yogis, Kalitas, Kayasthas and older Muslims of Bihari descent settled in this part of land prior to the advent of East India Company into North East India. All of them settled in this area during the period of Mughal aggression into the region.

Diwali, Holi, Durga Puja, Saraswati Puja, Lakshmi Puja, Kali puja, and Shiva ratri are some of the widely celebrated festivals of the area. Those of Islamic faith celebrate Eid and Muharram. Besides the religious festivals, Bihu, the agricultural festival of Assam is celebrated by all Assamese, irrespective of caste, creed or religion.

The 44th conference of the Asam Sahitya Sabha was held in Abhayapuri in 1977 under the presidency of Syed Abdul Malik, a big name in the history of modern Assamese literature. The area where the conference was held is still known as Sahitya Sabha Path.

== Demographics ==
As of 2001 India census, Abhayapuri had a population of 14,671. Males constitute 52% of the population and females 48%. Abhayapuri has an average literacy rate of 79%, higher than the national average of 59.5%; with 55% of the males and 45% of females literate. 10% of the population is under 6 years of age. According to the census of 2011, the town has a population of 15,847 (Area: 4.74 km^{2} – Density: 3,343.2 inhabitants/km^{2}) that shows an increase of 0.77%.

In the last few years, population of Abhayapuri has increased surprisingly with a large number migrating government workers starting to reside permanently in the town. In addition, people migrating from nearby villages also catapulted the population. This burst in population, combined with lack of development in public infrastructural facilities, has started playing spoilsport on the once-remarkably-peaceful small town in recent years. Also, the increasing number of private and public vehicles, especially small passenger carriers like 'tempos' and vans, and motorcycles has raised serious concern about road traffic safety.

== Educational institutes ==
- Abhayeswari H.S. & M.P. School (established 1904)
- Abhayapuri College (established 1955)
- Little Flower English High School (established 1995)
- The Rajbari School
- Montfort School, Batabari
- Faculty M.P. High School, Rowmari
- Laksminath Bezbaruah Academy, Abhayapuri
- Shankardev Shishu Niketan, Abhayapuri (1997)
- Chilaray Jatia Vidyalya, North Salmara
- Jatia Vidyalaya, Abhayapuri
- SRI SRI RAVISHANKAR VIDYA MANDIR, AMTOLA
- Bapuli High School, Abhayapuri
- JNM Girls High School, Abhayapuri

== Politics ==
Abhayapuri consists of two assembly constituencies: Abhayapuri North and Abhayapuri South, both of which are part of Barpeta (Lok Sabha constituency).

== Places of interest ==
=== Kakoijana reserved forest ===
Kakoijana reserved forest is a reserved forest famous for the Golden Langur.

=== Koya Kujia Eco Park ===
Koya Kujia Eco Park is a natural water-body with its banks choked with human settlements two years back, but is now an eco park with much space devoted to recreation.

=== Astha Nature's Home ===
Astha Nature's Home is an eco resort nestled in the foothills of Bamungaon hill.
