= Gola Ghar =

Historical monument in Sivasagar, Assam, India

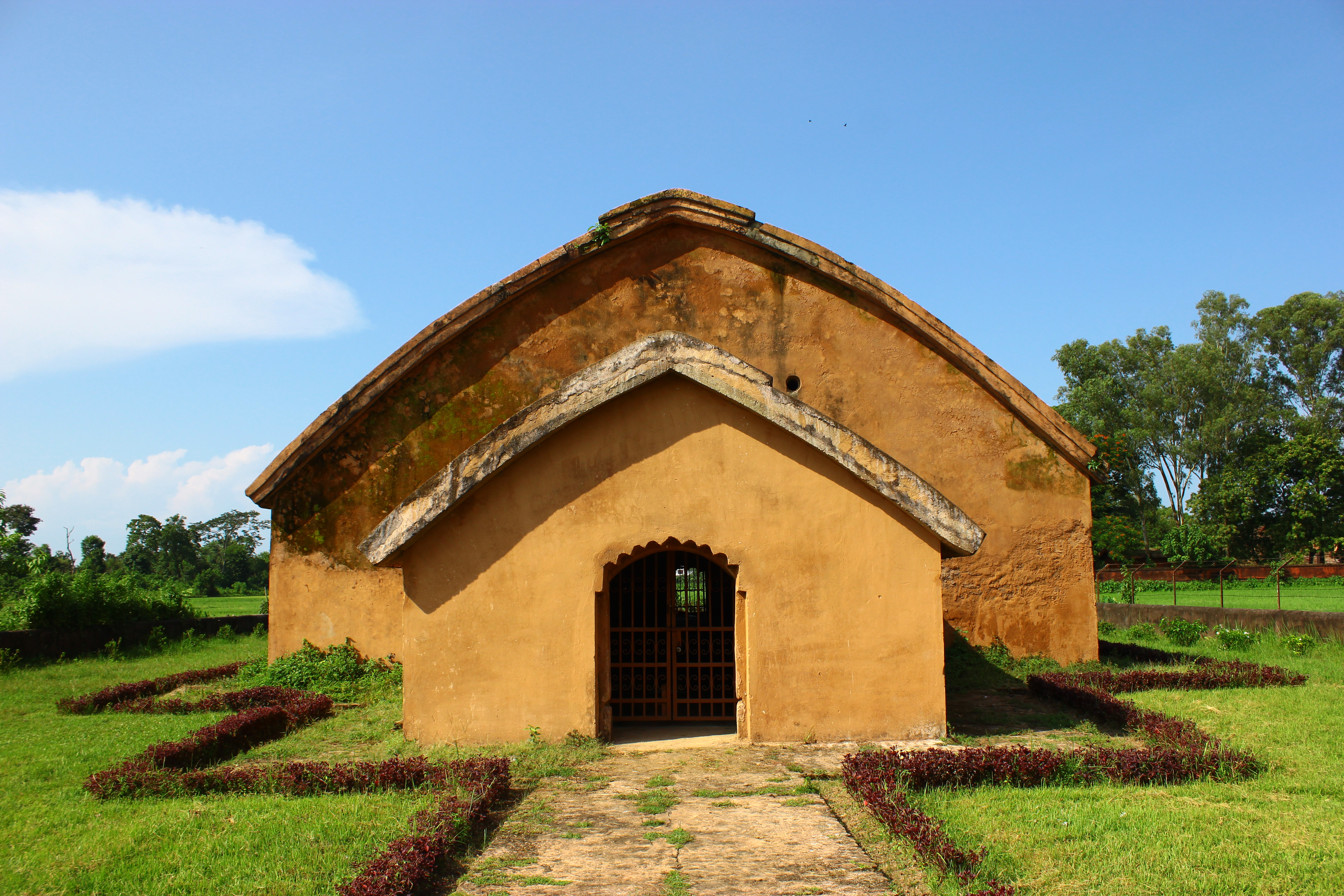
- Front view of Gola Ghar
- Interactive map of the Gola Ghar area

General information
- Location: Sivasagar, Assam, India, Sivasagar, India
- Completed: 1663 - 1669; 357 years ago

The Gola Ghar (Assamese for 'Cannon House') is a historical monument located in Joysagar, 4 km from Sivasagar, Assam. It is an ammunition store house used by the Ahoms and is situated near the Talatal Ghar.

== Structure ==
Architecturally it is a rectangular brick hut with two-layered roof. The Gola Ghar is 22.8 metres long, 11.7 metres wide and the walls are 2.15 metres thick. There are circular holes in front and back and also multiple square holes for ventilation.

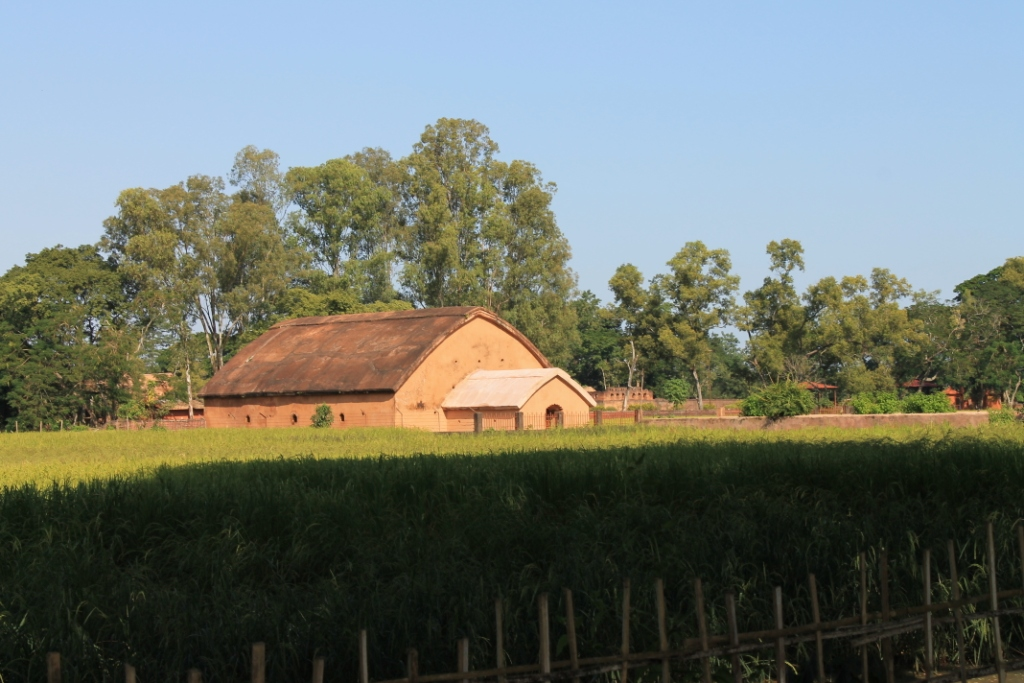
Side view

== See also ==
- Rang Ghar
- Kareng Ghar
