= Gourisagar Pukhuri =

Lake in Assam

- Gaurisagar Tank
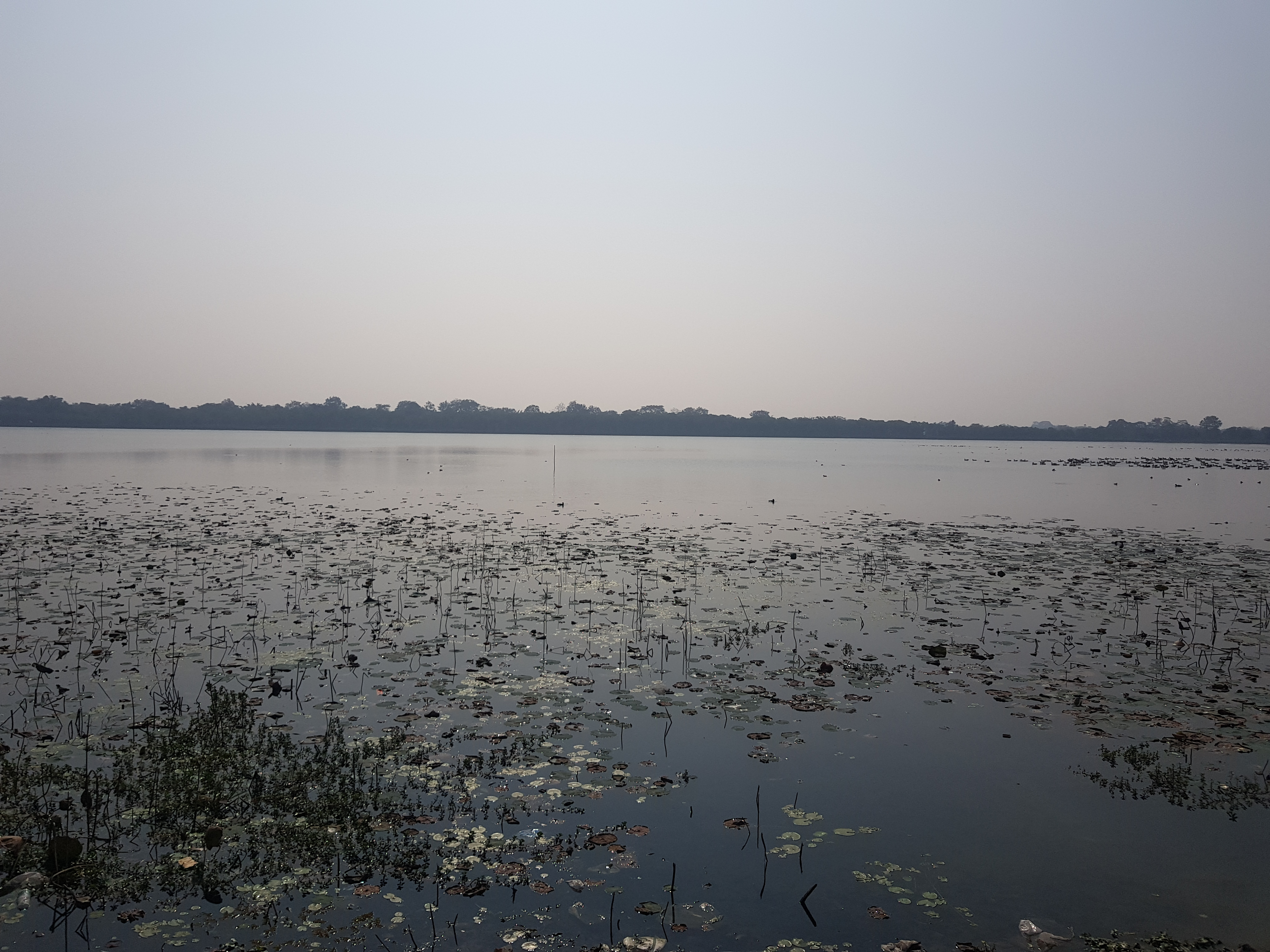
- Gaurisagar Lake
- Interactive map of Gourisagar Pukhuri
- Location: Sivasagar district, Assam, India
- Coordinates: 26°56′37.5″N 94°32′16.45″E
- Type: Tank
- Etymology: Sivasingha
- Built: 1715; 311 years ago

Gourisagar Pukhuri or Gaurisagar Tank is an artificial lake in Sivasagar, Sivasagar district in the state of Assam in India. It is situated 12 km away from Sivasagar.

== Etymology ==
Gourisagar Pukhuri popularly known as Gourisagar Tank, there are three temples on the north bank. DeviDoul, adorned with sandstone sculptures. In winter migratory birds visit the lake in large numbers.

== History ==
Gaurisagar Lake was constructed between 1715 and 1719 by Queen Phuleswari, who was wife of King Siva Singha.

== See also ==
- List of lakes of Assam
