= Dumuria =

- Village
- Location in Assam, India Dumuria (India)
- Coordinates: 26.495771°N 91.1497879°E
- Country: India
- State: Assam
- District: Bajali

Government
  - Body: Gram panchayat

Population (2001)
  - Total: 1,367

Languages
  - Official: Assamese
- Time zone: UTC+5:30 (IST)
- PIN: 781325
- Telephone code: 91-3666
- Vehicle registration: AS-15

Dumuria is a village and a Gaon Panchayat in Bajali district in the Indian state of Assam.

== History ==
Dumuria served as the second capital of the Bijni kingdom, a branch of the Koch dynasty. The capital had been located in a village now known as Bijni until it was attacked in 1864 by Jhawlia Mech, a chieftain from Bhutan. This event was followed by the Assam earthquake of 1897 which severally damaged the royal palaces of Dumuria. In search of a safe haven, the capital was temporarily relocated to Jogighopa before finally settling in the Deohati forest area which was later renamed as Abhayapuri.

== Administration ==
The Bajali district headquarters in Madon Rauta Nagar comes under area jurisdiction of Dumuria village.

== Demographics ==
As of 2001 India census, Dumuria had a population of 1367. Males constitute 50% (683) of the population and females 50% (684).Total number of Household is 251. Dumuria has an average literacy rate of 81%, higher than the national average of 59.5%: male literacy is 85%, and female literacy is 76%. In Dumuria, 10% of the population is under 6 years of age.

100% of the population is ethnic Assamese people and they speak Assamese.

== Boundary ==
It is around 3 km west from Pathsala Town

East	West	North	South
Turkuni Jaan	Denartari Village	31 National Highway	Natun Belana Village

== Education ==
Dumuria has High School, ME School, Primary School

High School Name	ME School Name	Primary SchoolName
Janata High School	Dumria ME School	148 no. Dumuria Primary School
