= Dimaruguri =

- city
- Location in Assam, India Dimaruguri (India)
- Coordinates: 26.7833°N 94.2000°E
- Country: India
- State: Assam
- District: Nagaon

Population (2001)
  - Total: 9,219

Languages
  - Official: Assamese
- Time zone: UTC+5:30 (IST)
- Vehicle registration: AS

Dimaruguri is a census town in Nagaon district in the state of Assam, India.

== Demographics ==
As of 2001 India census, Dimaruguri had a population of around 9,219, with males constituting 52% of the population and females 48%. The average literacy rate of Dimaruguri was 66%, higher than the national average of 59.5% at the time. Male literacy was 71% and, female literacy 61%. 13% of the population was under 6 years of age.
