= Shri Kedar Temple =

Hindu temple in Assam, India

Coordinates: 26°14′30″N 91°32′38″E

Sri Kedar Temple
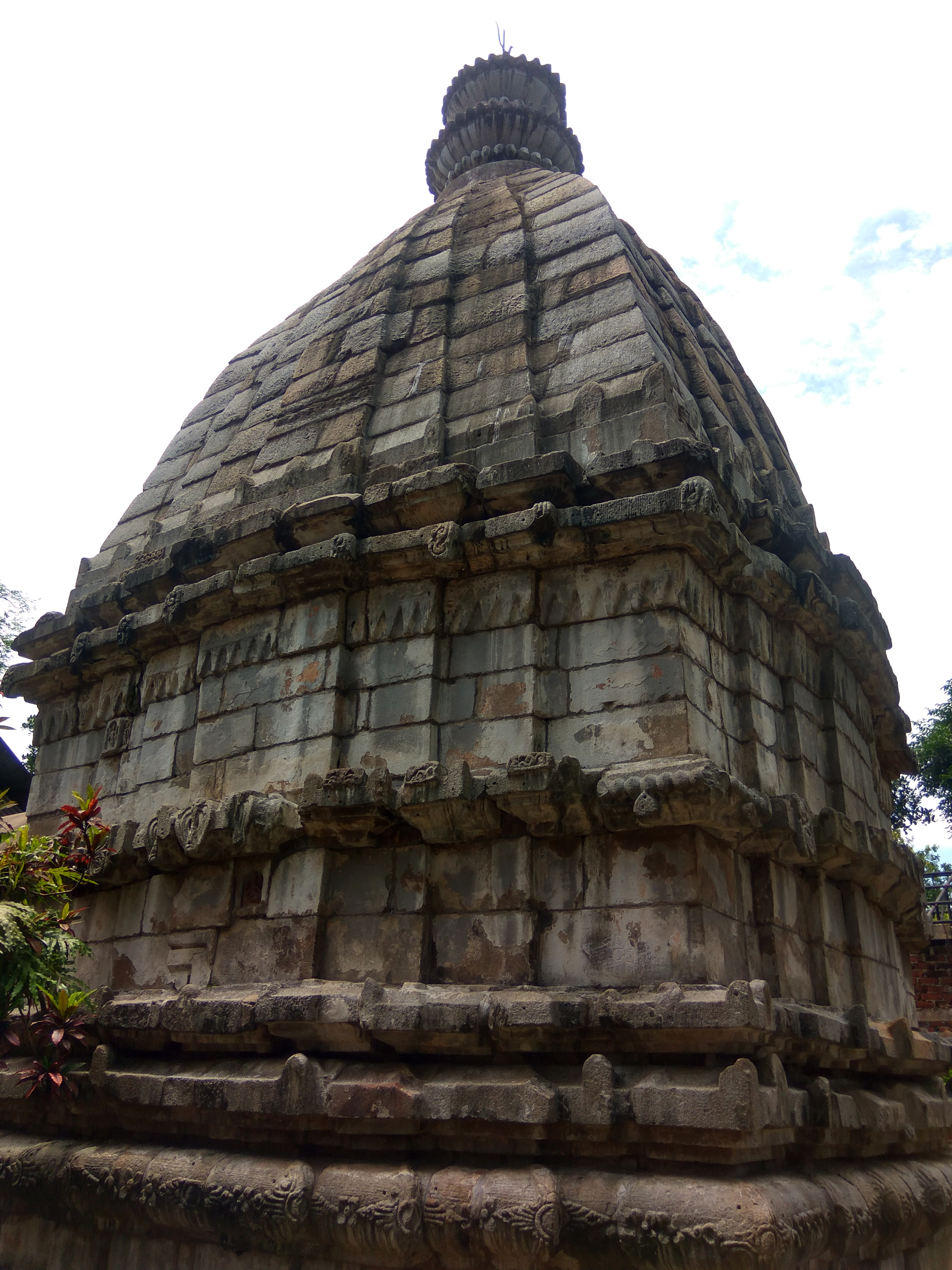
- Sri Sri Kedar Mandir

Religion
- Affiliation: Hinduism
- Deity: Shiva

Location
- Location: Hajo
- State: Assam
- Country: India
- Interactive map of Sri Kedar Temple

Architecture
- Creator: Rajeswar Singha
- Completed: 1753; 273 years ago

Shri Kedar Temple (also known as Kedareswara Temple) is a medieval Hindu temple dedicated to Shiva located at top of Madanachala hill in Hajo, Kamrup, Assam. The central chamber has a linga. The temple, along with the two walls adjacent, build by Ahom King Rajeswara Singha in 1753. The linga in this temple is considered as Swayambhu - the one that originates itself and is not crafted or made.
