= Bishyanath Temple =

Coordinates: 24.7517°N 90.4174°E

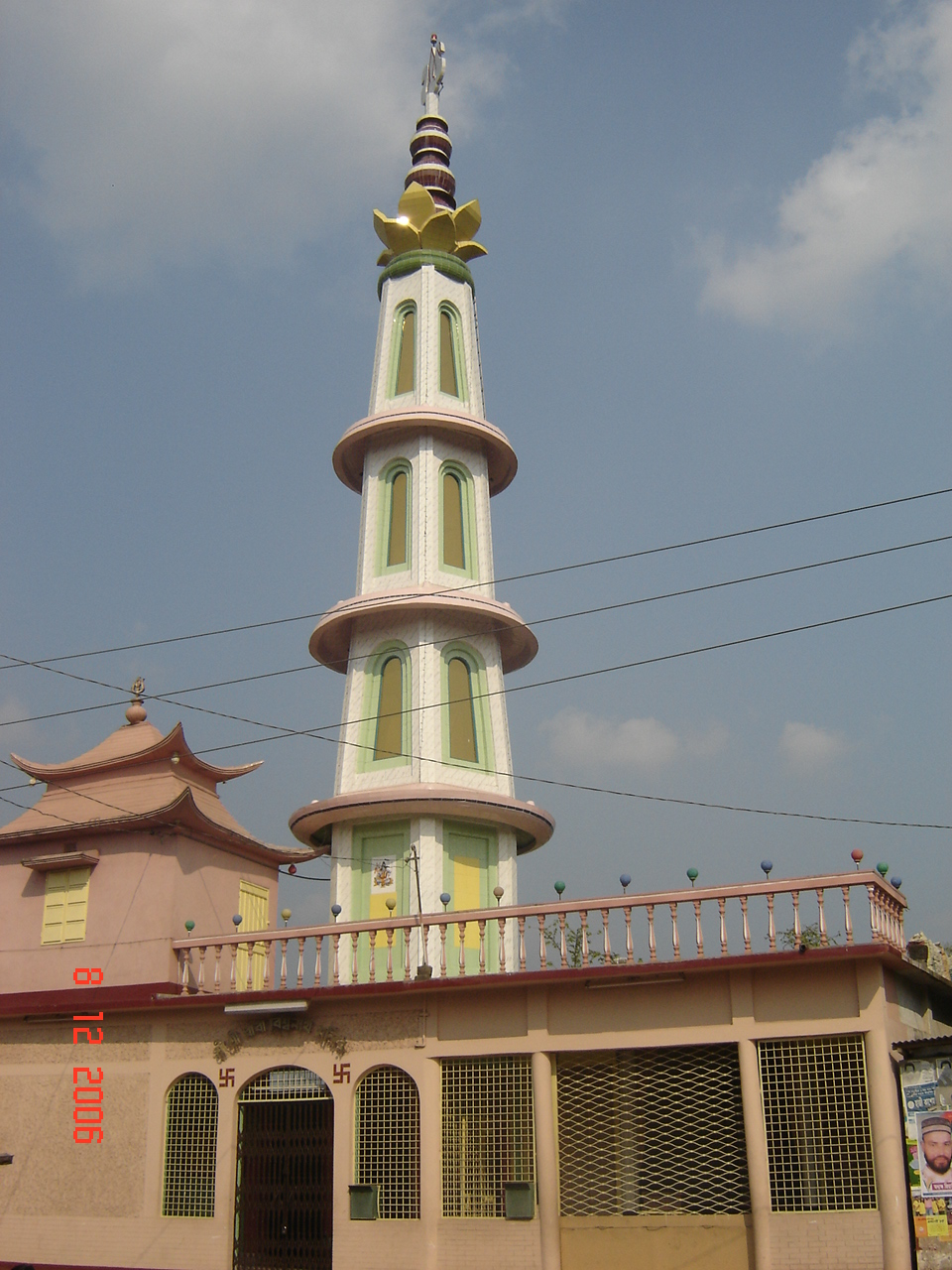
Bishyanath Temple

Bishyanath Temple is a Hindu temple, dedicated to the Hindu God Shiva, in the Mymensingh district of Bangladesh. It is one of the notable temples in the district.

The temple is unique because of its pagoda-like architecture.
