= Bharali River =

River in India

Location
- State: Assam
- District: Sonitpur

Physical characteristics
- Source: Arunachal Hills
  - location: Arunachal
- Mouth: Brahmaputra River

Basin features
- Progression: Bharali – Brahmaputra

The Bharali or Jia Bharali (also known as Kameng) is a tributary of the Brahmaputra River in the Indian state of Assam. The Bharali river originates in the hills of Arunachal Pradesh and flows through the heart of Tezpur before its confluence with the Brahmaputra river.

== Etymology ==
The name Bharali or Bharalu originate from Boro name – Bhollobri.
