= Kareng Ghar =

Royal palace in Garhgaon, India

Kareng
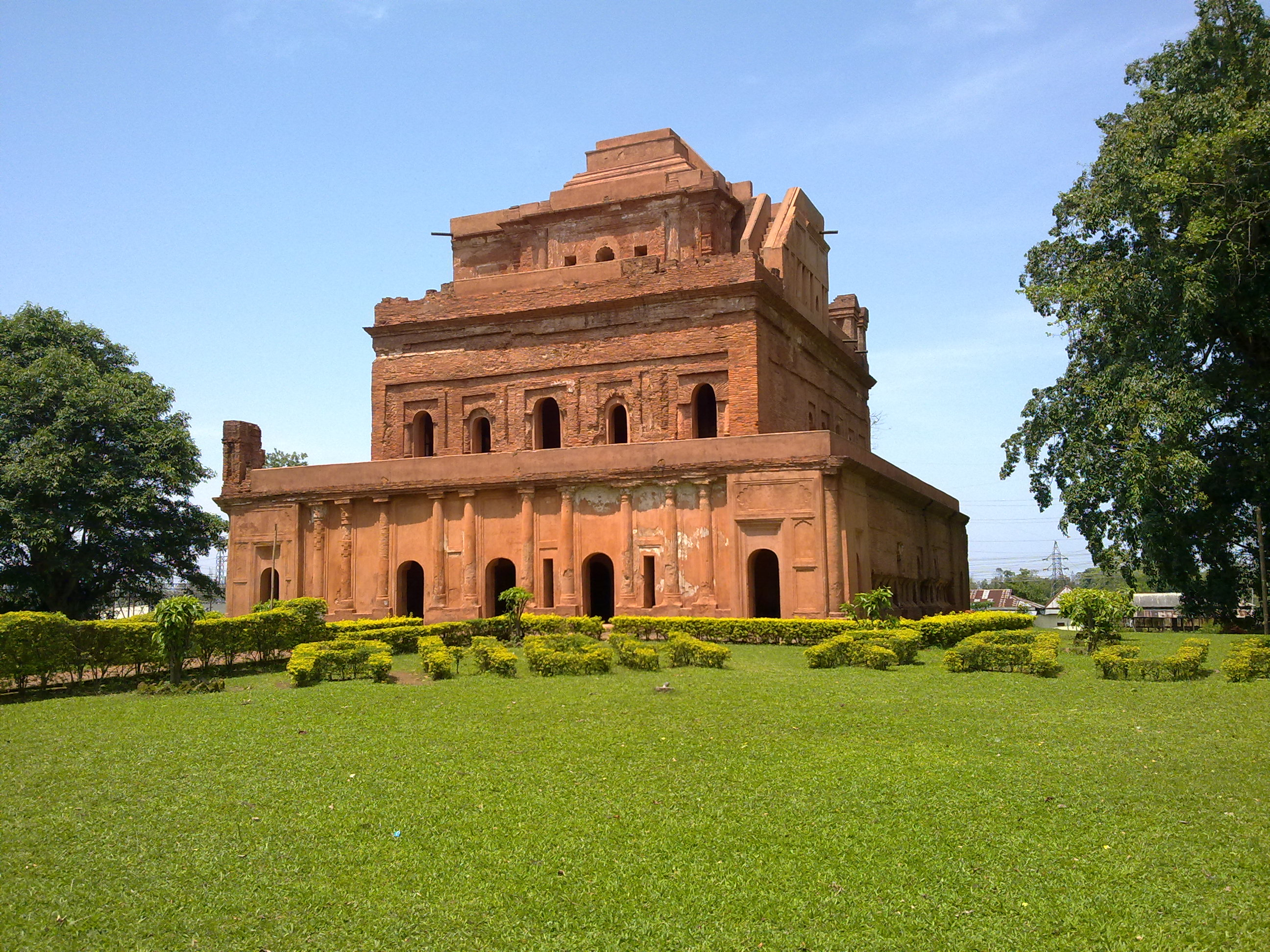
- View of Kareng situated at Garhgaon
- Interactive map of the Kareng area

General information
- Architectural style: Indian architecture Ahom Kingdom Architecture
- Location: Gurgaon, Assam, India
- Coordinates: 26.9366000°N 94.7452083°E
- Construction started: 1758; 268 years ago
- Client: Suremphaa or Rajeswar Singha
- Owner: Ahom Kingdom (1228-1826); British East India Company (1826-1858); British Empire (1858-1947); India (1947-present)

Technical details
- Structural system: Bricks and indigenous type of cement

Kareng (Assamese: [kɑ:ɹɛŋ ˈgɑ:], "royal palace"), also known as The Garhgaon Palace, is located in Garhgaon 15 kilometres (9.3 mi) from Sivasagar, Assam, India. The palace structures were made of wood and stone. In 1751 Sunenphaa, son of Sukhrungphaa, constructed the brick wall of about 5 kilometres (3.1 mi) in length surrounding the Garhgaon Palace and the masonry gate leading to it.

After the destruction of the old palace it was rebuilt around 1752 as the present seven-storied structure by Suremphaa (1751–1769).

The earliest constructions were commissioned by Sukhrungphaa in 1698 AD. Rangpur was the capital of the Ahom Kingdom and served as its military station.

== Gallery ==
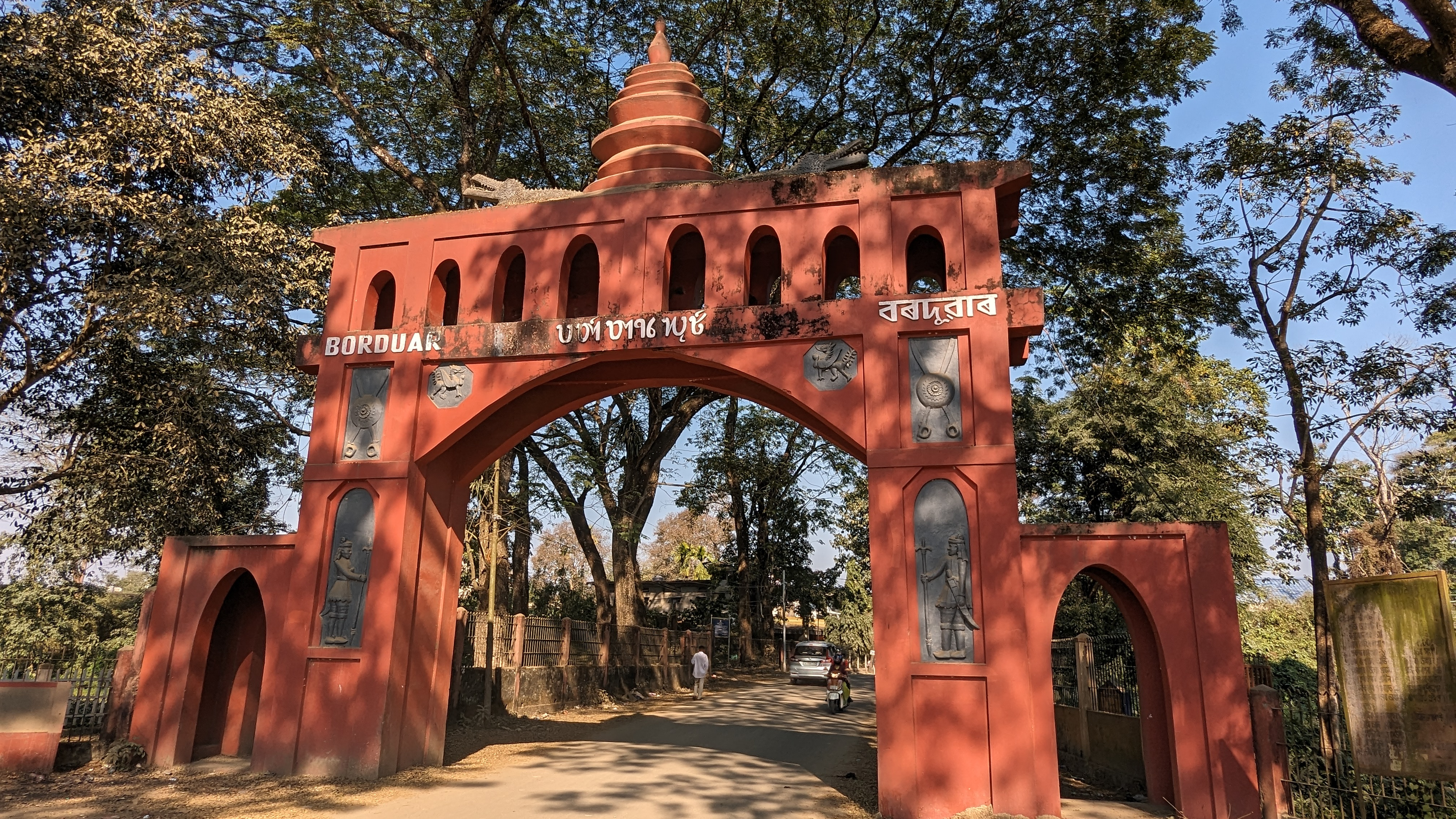
The Entrance gate

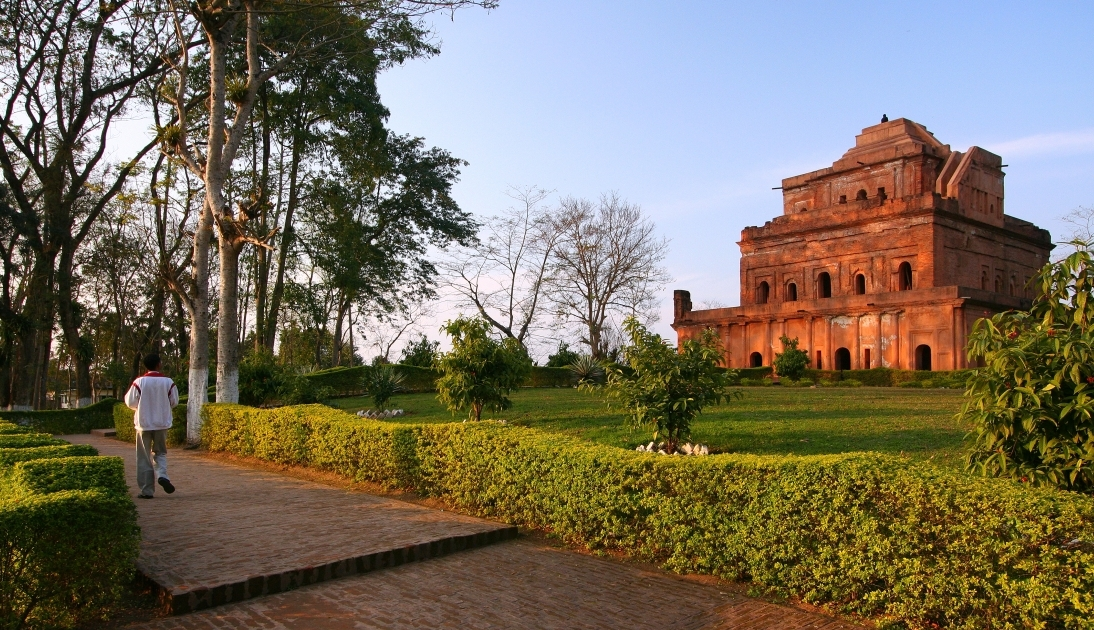

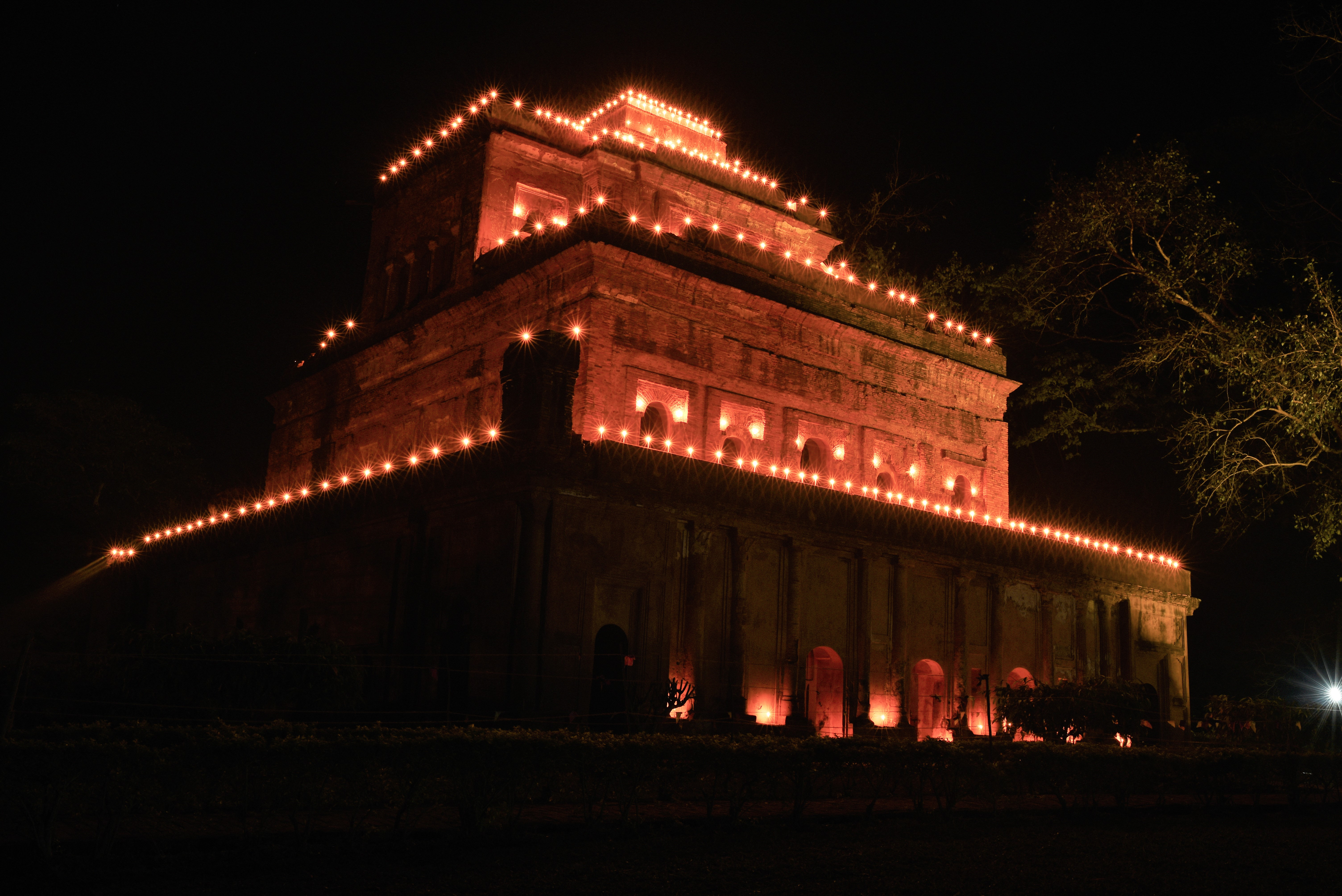

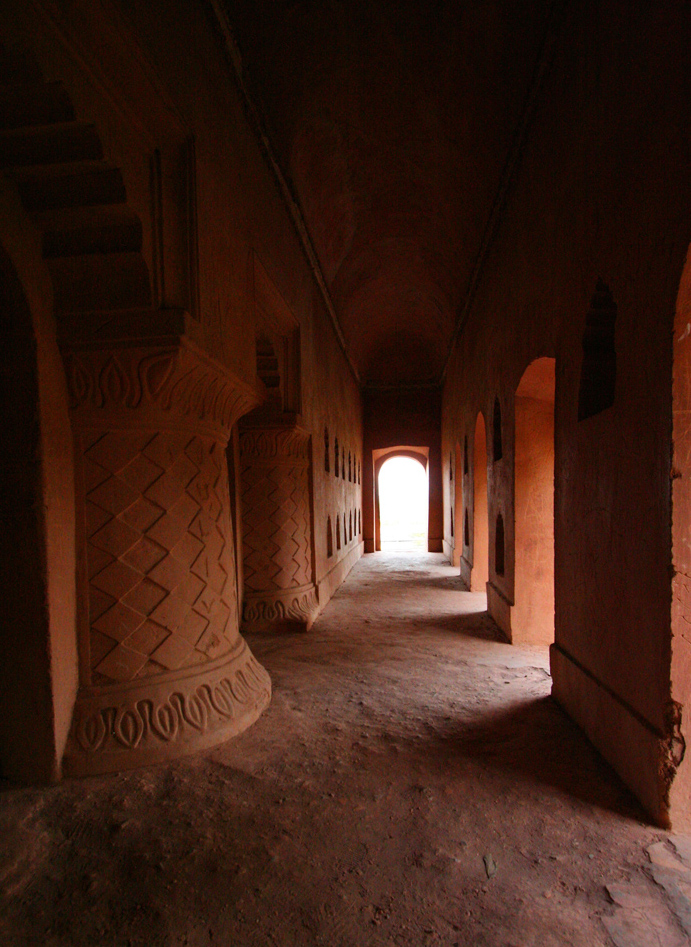

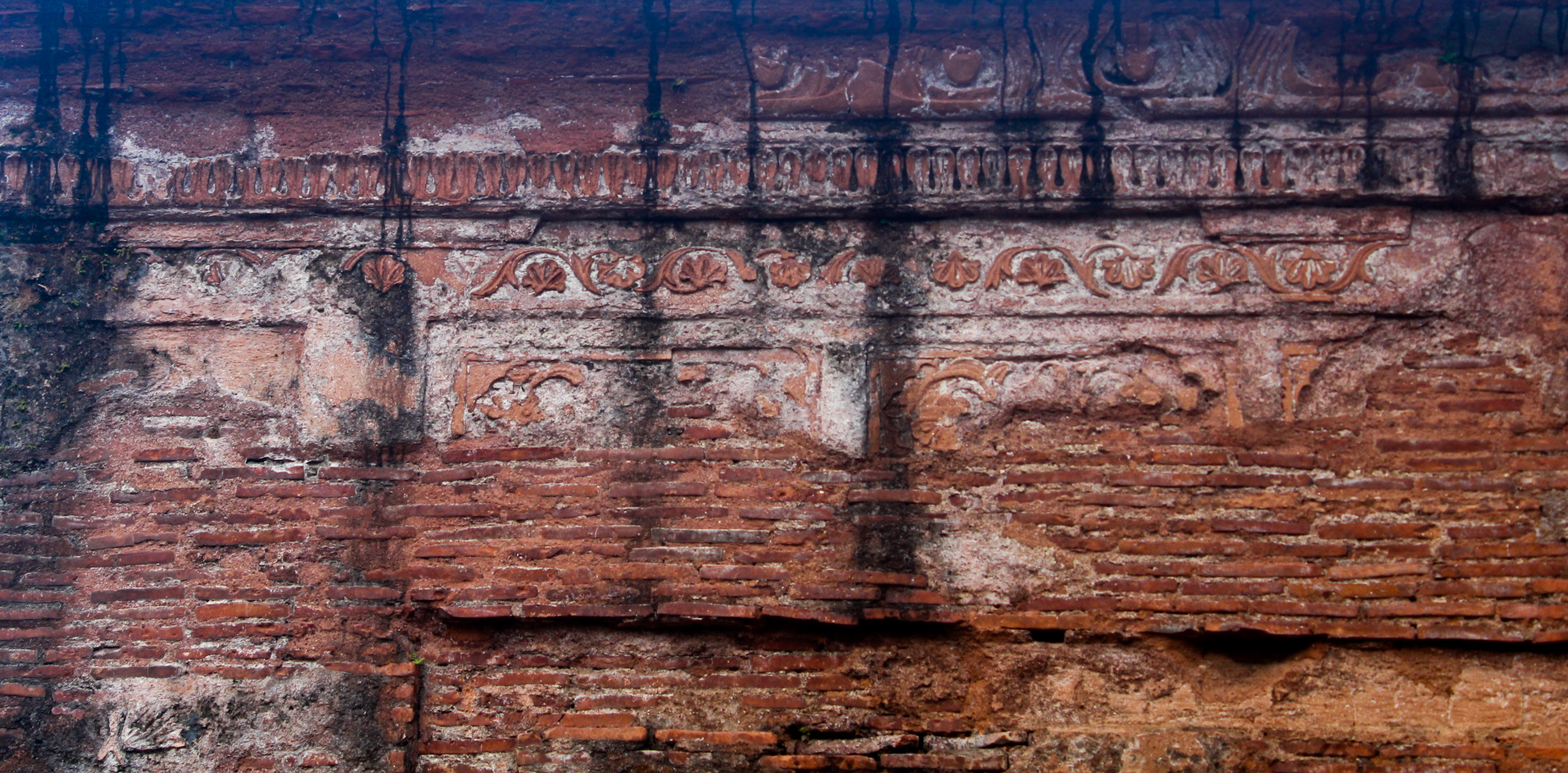
Surviving design at karengghar

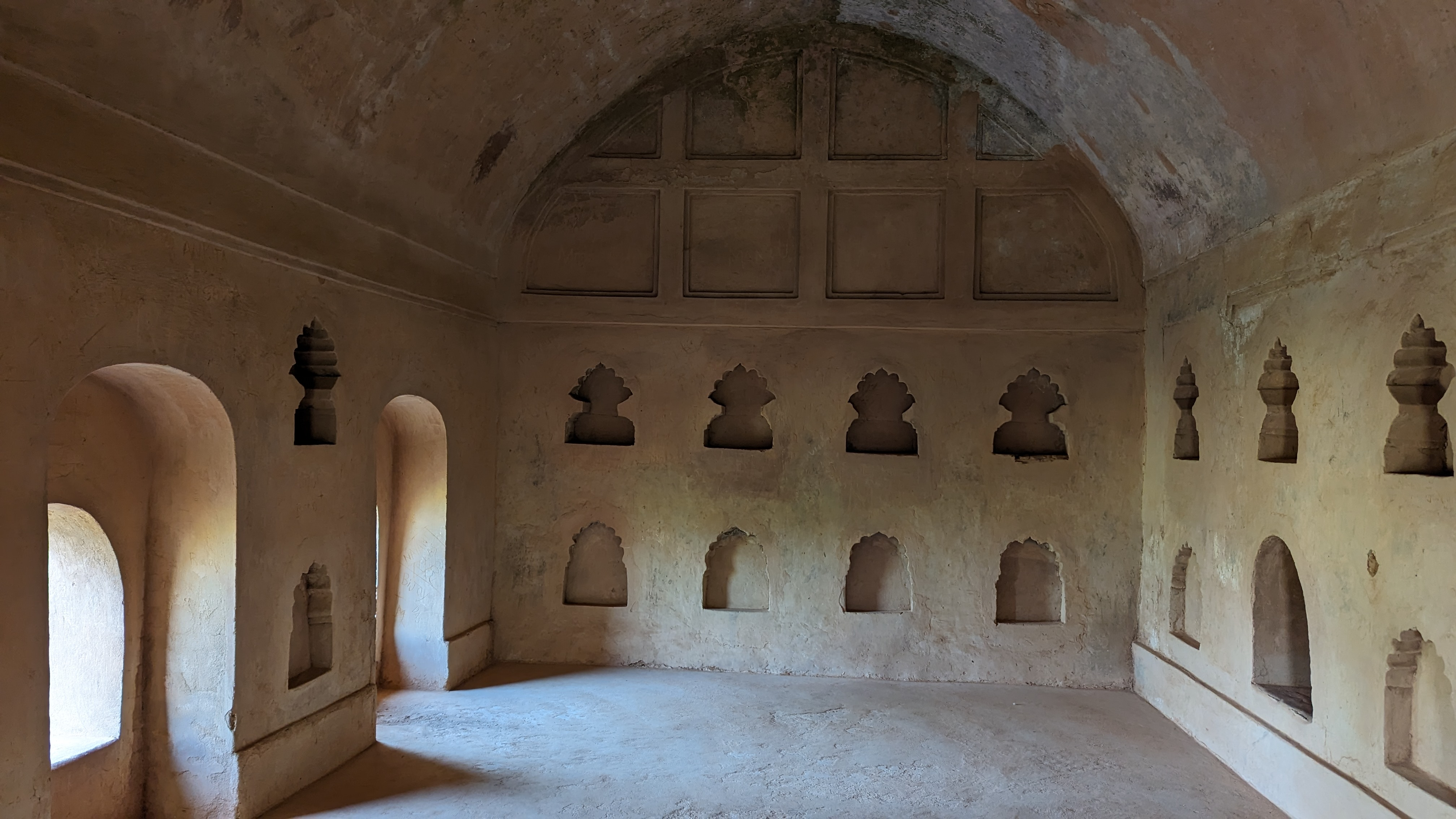
A chamber in Kareng Ghor

== See also ==
- Ahom Kingdom
- Charaideo
- Rang Ghar
- Sibsagar
- Talatal Ghar
- Tai people
- Ahom people
