= Singri (Assam) =

Village in Assam, India

- Interactive map of Singri

Singri is a village in Dhekiajuli, Sonitpur district in the Indian state of Assam. It is situated in the bank of the Brahmaputra river. It is known for Singri Tea Estate and Gupteshwar Temple as well as the ancient ruins of Vishwakarma Temple.

== History ==
Singri has been a pilgrimage site for Tibetans, Monpas, Shajalongs and Bhutanese since the 14th century, as mentioned by Jigme Lingpa in the 18th century. Thangtong Gyalpo, or Lama Chag Zhampa (Tibetan Yogi), visited the site in the 13th century and mentioned that there was a stupa. Monpa H.E. 12th and 13th Thegtse Rinpoche Namgye Tsering and Yeshe Zangpo also visited the site annually in the 18th and 19th centuries as part of their pilgrimage.

Gopteswar temple of Singari Hill is held in high veneration by the Tibetan Buddhist and Bhutanese since very early times. The Ahom chronicles inform us that, during the Ahom-Mughal war (1615-- 1638 C. E.), the silver cap of the idol of Gopeswar temple, earlier endowed by the Bhutanese, was damaged and looted by the Mughals. Ahoms established a military station and also a market under the supervision of a Duaria Baruah near this temple.

Swargadeo Siva Singha Sutanphaa repaired the ancient Gopeswar temple belonging to the 7th-10th centuries A. D. Besides Gopeswar, ruins of three temples were seen: Bhaga Mandir, Bangla basti and Biswakarma mandir. The extensive ruins of temples of Singari belong to Buddhist, Shiva and Durga shrines of about the 9th century A. D.

== Demographics ==
The tea estate and its adjacent settlements are inhabited mostly by tea-garden workers. According to data of Census of India, 2011, Singri has a population of 3,722 including 1,897 males and 1,825 females. 1,172 are workers, including 1,032 males and 140 females.

== Singri Tea Estate ==
Singri Tea Estate is run by Bokahola Tea Co Pvt Ltd and provides the bulk of jobs in the area. A factory and an adjacent office are present.

== Gupteswar temple ==
Gupteshwar Temple is located along the bank of river Brahmaputra. People from around Assam and abroad come to Gupteshwar Temple during Maha Shivratri. It is a prehistoric temple of lord Shiva. While the Sringhi Rishi was meditating in the Singri hills, the rakshasas became jealous and chased him. He entered a pool to hide. Tinali Center lies downhill of guptshwar.

A large fair with attractions and a circus takes place during the temple's annual festival.

== Vishwakarma temple (ruins) ==
Various sculptures and carvings of the walls are present in the temple ruins. A fair takes place during the annual festival of Vishwakarma.
