= Pratap Singha =

Ahom king from 1603 to 1641

- Chaopha Swargadeo of Ahom Kingdom

Ahom king
- Reign: 1603–1641
- Predecessor: Sukhaamphaa
- Successor: Suramphaa
- Born: Langi Gohain c. 1545; Ahom kingdom
- Died: 1641 (aged 95–96); Ahom kingdom
- Spouse: Jaintia Princess; Mangaldahi
- Issue: Suramphaa; Sutingphaa
Names
- Burha Roja Buddhi Swarganarayan Pratap Singha
- Dynasty: Ahom dynasty
- Father: Sukhaamphaa
- Religion: Ahom religion; Hinduism

Pratap Singha (c. 1545 – 1641), also known as Susengpha, was the 17th and one of the most prominent kings of the Ahom kingdom. As he was advanced in years when he became king, he is also called the burha Raja (Old king). His reign saw an expansion of the Ahom kingdom to the west, the beginning of the Ahom-Mughal conflicts, and a reorganization of the kingdom with an expanded Paik system and reoriented village economy designed by Momai Tamuli Borbarua. His expansion to the west is underlined by the two new offices that he created: that of the Borbarua and the Borphukan. The alliances he formed with the rulers of Koch Hajo resulted in formation that successfully thwarted Mughal expansion. The administrative structure that he created survived until the end of the Ahom kingdom in 1826.

== Reign ==
After the death of Sukhampha in 1603, his son Langi Gohain, was installed as the Swargadeo by the ministers Tonkham Borgohain, Chaopet Burhagohain and Banjangi Borpatrogohain. At his coronation he was 58 and he assumed the name Susengpha accorded to him by the Tai priests. He accepted an offer of marriage to the Jaintia princess and the subsequent events brought him into conflict with the Kachari kingdom. He also established alliance with the Koch Hajo rulers by marrying Mangaldahi, the daughter of Parikshit Narayan, in 1608.

According to historian Late Benudhar Sarma, the present form of worship of Durga with earthen idol in upper Assam was started during the reign of King Susengpha or Pratap Singha. The King heard about the festivity, the pomp and grandeur with which the King Naranarayan of Koch Bihar celebrated Durga Puja from one Sondar Gohain, who was held captive by the Koch Raja. King Pratap Singha sent artisans to Koch Bihar to learn the art of idol making. The King organised the first such Durga Puja celebration in Bhatiapara near Sibsagar. This was the first time Durga Puja with earthen idols in upper Assam was held for the masses, in addition to the worship in Durga temples.

=== Conflict with Mughals ===
The conflict between Koch Bihar and Koch Hajo drew the Mughals and finally the Ahoms into the conflict in 1615, which finally ended in 1682 with Supatpha a later Ahom Swargadeo removing Mughal influence for ever from Assam. An interim truce (Treaty of Asurar Ali) was signed during Susengpha's reign. A necessary outcome of the Ahom-Mughal conflicts was cessation of Ahom-Kachari hostilities and restoration of peace, to confront a common enemy.

=== Administration ===
As the Mughal attacks weakened Koch Hajo state powers and Ahom influence spread west, Susengpha appointed Langi Panisiya the first Borphukan as his western viceroy, based at Kajali, and in charge of all Ahom territories west of Kaliabor. The three classes of ministers Burhagohain, Borgohain and Borpatrogohain had their well defined areas to rule and function, and those part of the kingdom which did not fall under their jurisdiction were brought under the control of the Borbarua, a new office that was also created during the rule of Pratap Singha. Under him Momai Tamuli Borbarua, the first Borbarua, made extensive changes to the Paik system and village economy.

He redistributed populations to consolidate his rule. He moved the Bhuyans, the remnant of the Bhuyan chieftains, from the north to the south bank of the Brahmaputra, decreasing their power considerably. He moved eight thousand families to the sparsely populated Marangi area which was originally recovered from the Kachari kingdom by Suhungmung.

Creation of other posts like Rohiyal Barua, Jagiyal Gohain, Kajalimukhiya Gohain is also credited to him. For his organizational capability, political acumen and his wisdom, he was also known as Buddhi Swarganarayan.

Pratap Sinha died in the year 1641 after a long reign of 38 years. Although a great part of his reign was distracted by wars with the Kacharis and the Mughals, he was still able to devote much attention to the internal organisation of his kingdom, development of backward tracts and construction of roads, bridges, embankments and tanks. He also built a number of towns

== See also ==
- Ahom Dynasty
- Battle of Samdhara
- Momai Tamuli Borbarua
