= Pandu, Guwahati =

- Suburb
- Interactive map of Pandu, Guwahati
- Coordinates: 26°09′49″N 91°40′50″E
- Country: India
- State: Assam
- Region: Western Assam
- District: Kamrup Metropolitan

Area
  - Total: 2.53 km^{2} (0.98 sq mi)

Dimensions
  - Length: 2.19 km (1.36 mi)
  - Width: 1.90 km (1.18 mi)
- Time zone: UTC+5:30 (IST)
- Area code: 781028
- Vehicle registration: AS - 01
- Website: gmc.assam.gov.in

Pandu is a locality in Guwahati, India. Its nearest airport is Guwahati Airport and nearest railway station is the Kamakhya station. It was named after the Pandunath Temple which is located in the Tilla hills part of the locality. It is situated north of Maligaon locality and have Brahmaputra River to north. Due to its location on the shores of the Brahmaputra River, the Pandu Port is a major hub of river transport facilities, managed by Inland Waterways Authority of India.

== See also ==
- Dharapur
- Beltola
- Bhetapara
- Chandmari
- Ganeshguri
