= Hajo =

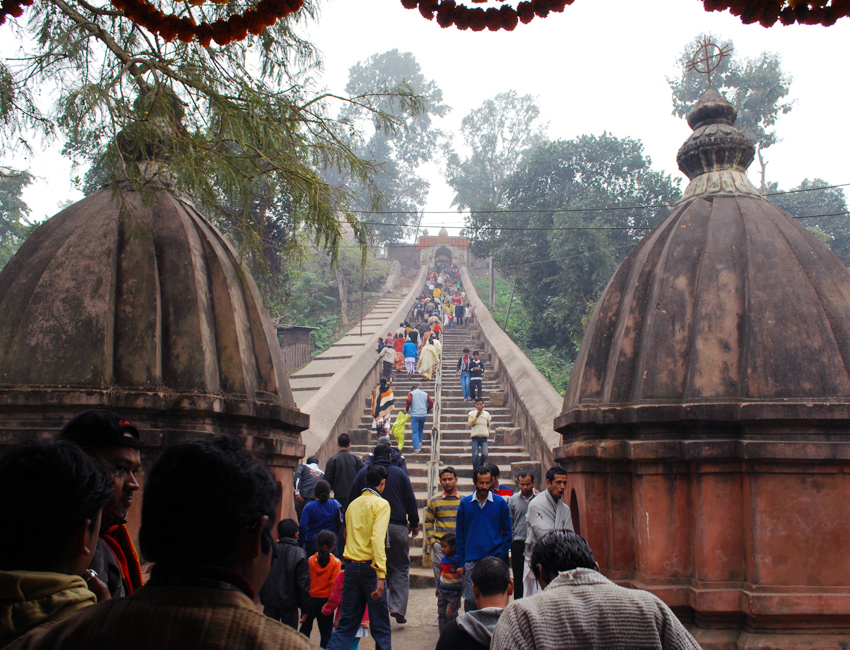
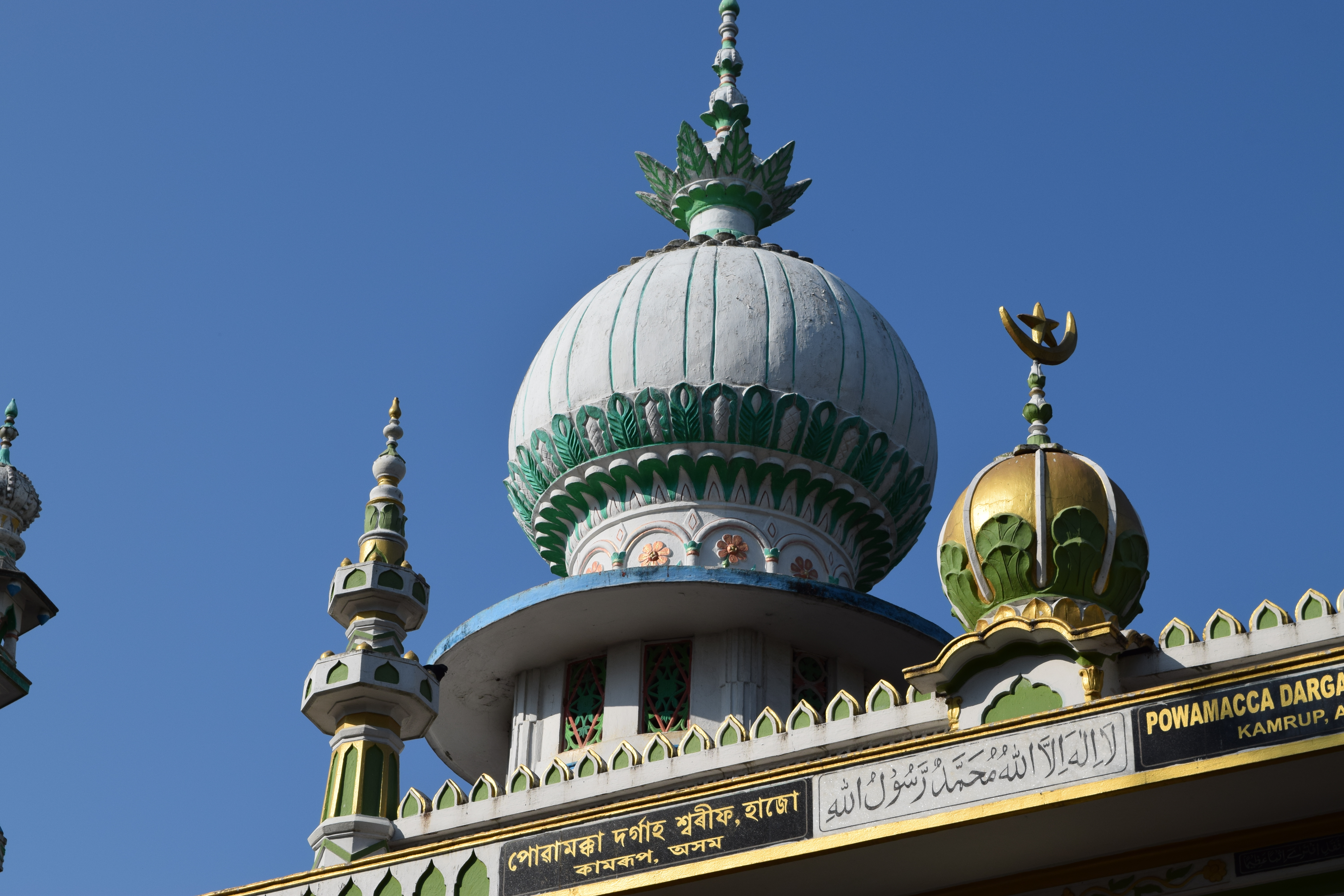
- Entrance of Hayagriva Madhab mandir, Hajo Powa Mecca (Poa Mecca)

- Location of Hajo Hajo (India)
- 26°14′55″N 91°31′32″E
- Location: Hajo, Assam, India
- Nearest city: Guwahati

History
- Built: 10th–18th century CE

Site notes
- Architectural styles: Hindu, Buddhist and Indo-Islamic-Mughal architecture
- Governing body: Archaeological Survey of India

Hajo is a historic town set in the hills northwest of Guwahati, Assam, India. It is a meeting point of Buddhists, Hindus and Muslims due to the various pilgrimage sites on the different hills of Hajo. To the Hindus, the Manikut Parbat of Hajo is the site of the 10th-century temple ruins and the 11th- to 16th-century temples complex for Vaishnavism as well as shrines of Shaivism and Shaktism. To the Buddhists, particularly from Bhutan and Tibet, Assam is where the Buddha died and the Hayagriva temple in Hajo is a part of the sacred geography of the Buddha. To the regional Muslims, the Mughal era Poa-Mecca shrine on another hill of Hajo has the tomb of Giyasuddin Aulia built in the 17th century.

Hajo is one of the important historical and archaeological sites in northeast India as it preserves the history, inscriptions and architecture in a range of temples and monuments over about 1200 years. It is also a site known for its tradition of preserving rare species of tortoises, with Hindus believing that they are a form of Kurma avatar of Vishnu.

== Location ==
Hajo is on the banks of the Brahmaputra River, 25 kilometres (16 mi) northwest from the city of Guwahati in the Kamrup district of Assam, India.

== Etymology ==
The word Hajo is derived from the Boro word 'Hajw' (Bodo: हाजो) which means hill. It is named after Koch Hajo, a Koch tribal chief of the early 16th century.

== Monuments ==
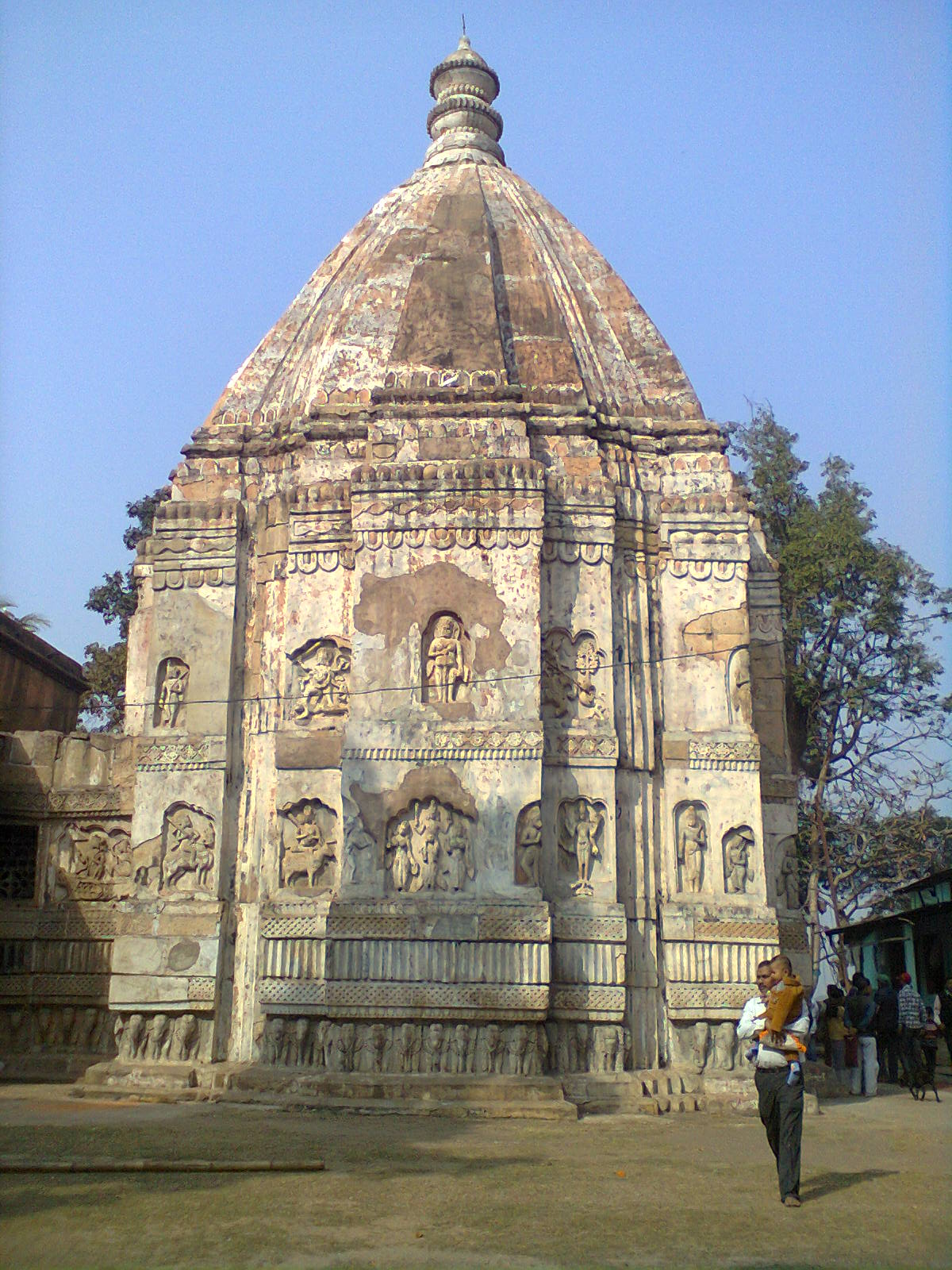
Hayagriva Madhava Temple, Hajo

=== Ancient to 16th century ===
- The Hajo pillar fragments are found within the premises of the temples complex called the Hayagriva Madhava Temple. It is a large monolithic pillar that likely broke in a historic earthquake, along with any monuments that may have existed near it. Four pieces of this pillar are known, three significant and retained by later restoration efforts of the temple, and one smaller piece of the same stone found after 1950. The locals now refer to it as the "Ashoka pillar". The pillar lacks any inscription, but has marks on it that appear to be of water erosion and not a script of any language. However, marks are on the side where the erosion marks would normally not be expected, given that Brahmaputra flows from east-northeastern to west-southwestern direction in Assam. Talukder in 1959 conjectured that this Hajo pillar was a Buddhist pillar, installed in 400 BCE (2400 years ago), created before Ashoka built "84000 stupas at a cost of 100 crores of rupees", and that the marks may have been caused by reverse flow of a small turbulent Brahmaputra stream in Hajo. If Talukder's conjecture is true, this would be the oldest known monolithic pillar and Buddhist monument in Asia. However, states the historian D.D. Kosambi, Talukder does not offer any evidence or arguments to support his conjecture. There is no evidence of any Buddhist stupa or vihara was ever built in Hajo. The Hajo pillar may be of much later date and may belong to either Buddhism, Hinduism or another tradition. The pillar's existence does suggest Hajo is a very old historic site where its people had mastered building methods long ago.
- Hayagriva Madhava Temple is situated on the Monikut hill (Manikuta Parvata). The present temple structure was constructed by the King Raghudeva Narayan in 1583. The earliest ruins suggest and the local tradition believes that the original temple was built during the Pala dynasty in the 10th century. It is a stone temple dedicated to Vishnu, and the best known, most frequented monument in Hajo. The temple enshrines an image of Hayagriva Madhava (Vishnu as part-man-part-horse avatar). Some regional Buddhists have long believed that the Hayagriva Madhava temple is a part of their sacred Tsmach'og-gron geography because it is where the Buddha died. According to Lavoni, the Tibetan Lamas believe that the Hayagriva image inside the Madhava temple is of "Mahamuni" (the Buddha) because near the statue is the inscription "Om Mani Padme Hum". The image is of four-armed Vishnu. This combination of a Buddhist mantra and Hindu iconography has made this temple sacred to both traditions. The 7th-century Chinese pilgrim Xuanzang visited Assam, and describes it to be a country with no Buddhists and only Deva-worshippers (Hindu). According to Spooner, this temple was repaired and plastered over in 1903–1904 to help preserve it.

The rows of elephants at the plinth of the Hayagriva Mahadeva temple are likely the oldest part here, about 10th century. They are fine specimens of Assamese art. The Hayagriva temple is a Nagara architecture temple, with a mandapa, antarala and garbhagriya. It has artwork from Vaishnavism, Shaivism and Shaktism.

- Kedareswara Temple: This is a Shiva temple on the Madanachal hill in Hajo with inscriptions showing land grants made during the Rajeswar Singha period. According to a field visit and survey completed by Spooner for ASI in 1912, the alternate name for this temple is Kedarnatha temple. He observed that the temple was likely rebuilt with stone during the Singha period, since it shows molding to be of a different stone and an attempt to fit the reconstructed temple over the remains of an older temple.
- Kamaleswara Temple: A Shiva temple from the Ahom-period also on the Madanachal hill, east of the Ganga-pushkarini.

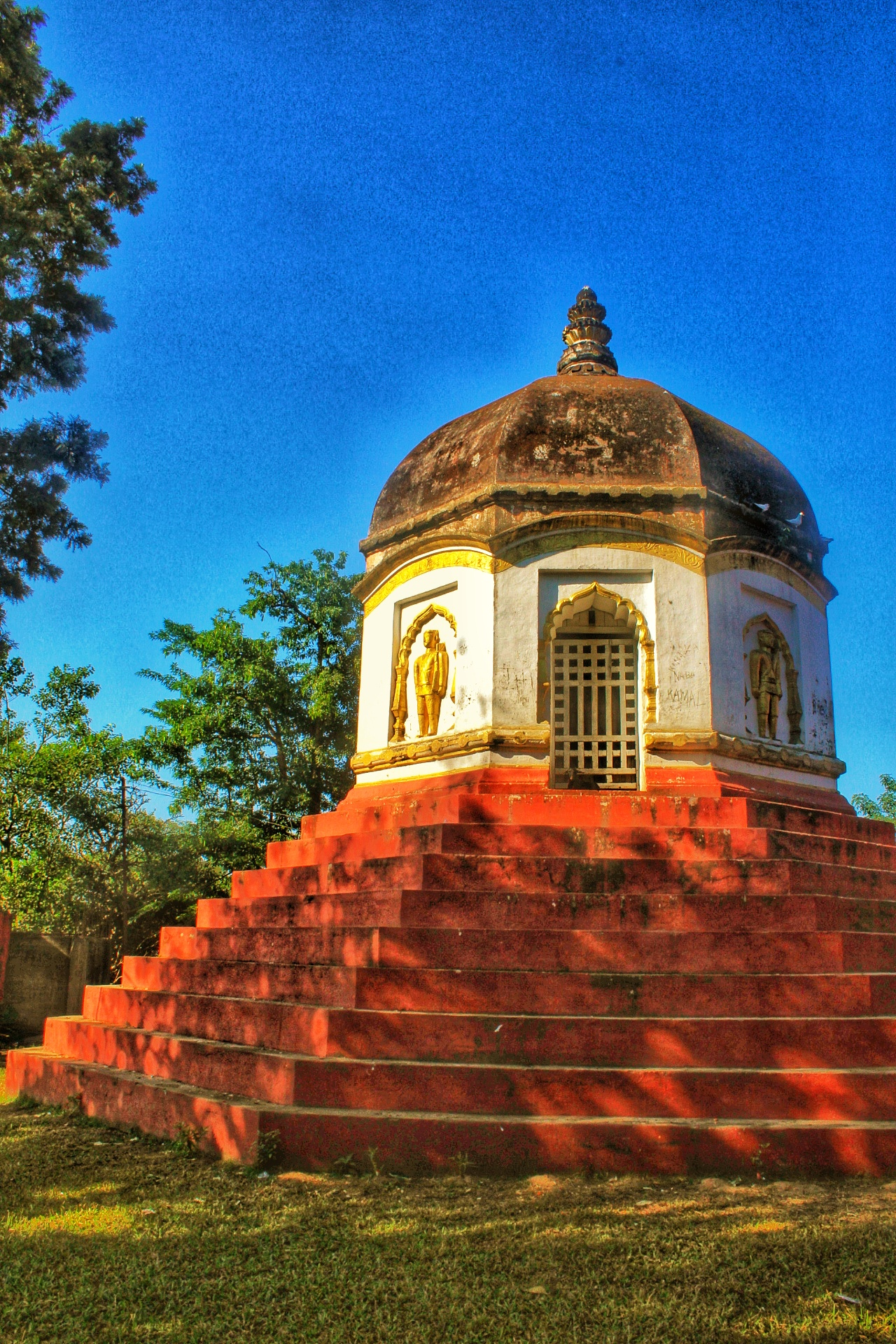
The Fakuwa Dol near the Madhava temple.

- Kameswara Temple
- Ganesha Temple: at the foot of the Madanachal hill. A boulder here looked like a Ganesha, per the local legend, and it has been carved to reveal the full image of Ganesha.
- Fakuwa Dol: near the Hayagriva Mahadeva temple, this Hindu shrine has an octagonal plan and domical top.

=== 17th century ===
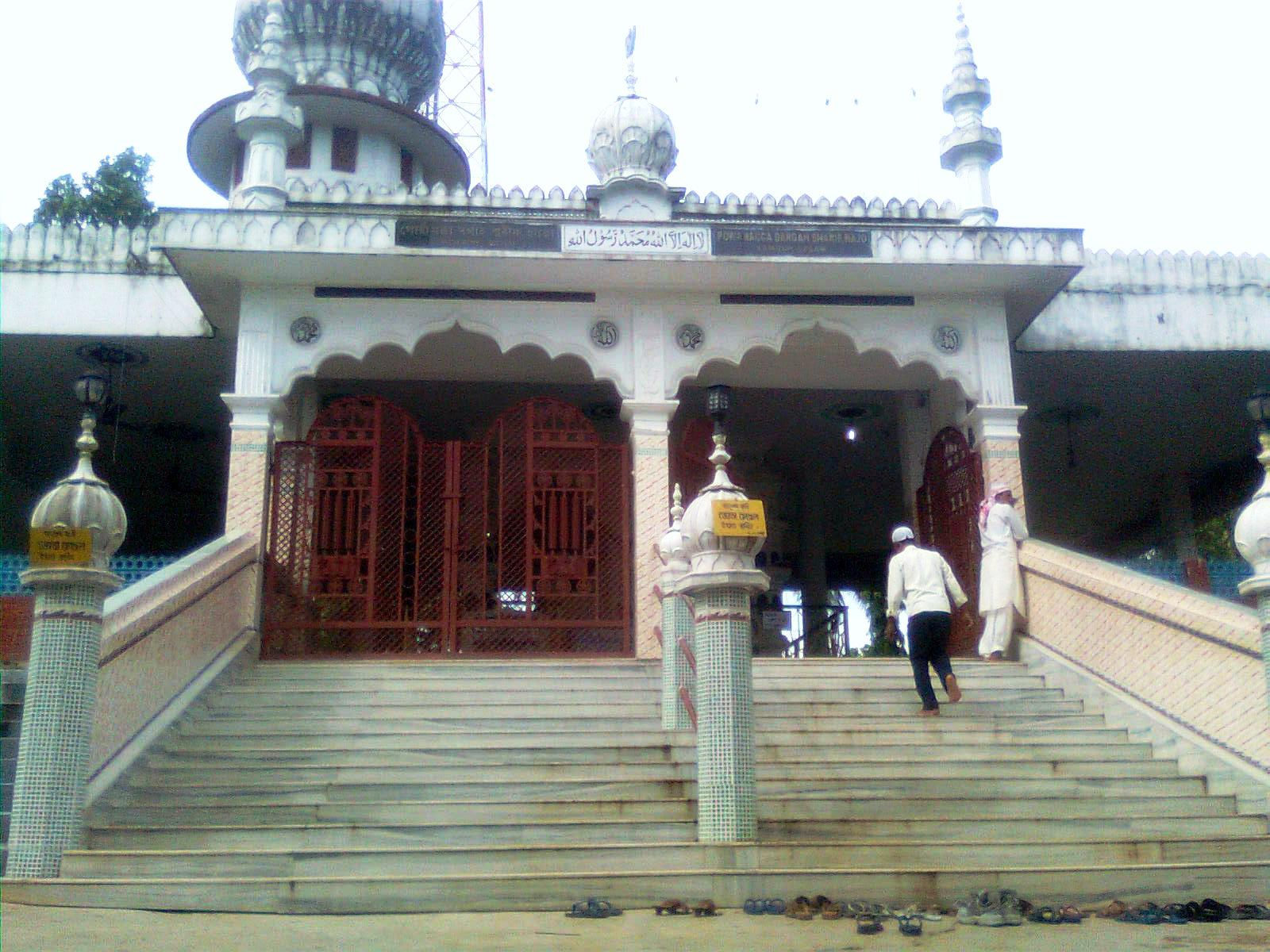
Hajo Barmaqam Powa Makkah

- Powa Makkah: The Garurachal hill in Hajo is the site of a Muslim tomb and mosque – Powa Makkah (Poa Mecca, a quarter of Makkah). It is a place of pilgrimage for the Muslims. Near it is now a renovated mosque, with an old Persian inscription from the 17th century. It mentions the Mughal prince Muhammad Shujauddin – one of the sons of Shah Jahan. The shrine has the tomb of Giyasuddin Aulia. The mosque and Aulia's tomb were visited by Spooner in 1912. His report states that the mosque was in a ruined state and the local Muslims have asked the British government to repair it with public funds. He mentions that the ruined "Poa Mecca" mosque was made from bricks that had collapsed in several places, and has an inscribed granite inside (5 feet by 1.75 feet) which states that it was built in 1657 CE. It is likely that the ruined mosque was restored with bricks again after the 17th century. It was covered with "jungle" and had not been used in a while. He also mentions that the Giyasuddin Aulia's tomb in front of it is just a grave and there is no shrine over it. The tomb, states Spooner, is of a Muslim governor who ruled over Kamrup district and nearby area. The inscription found inside this Hajo mosque said that it was built by an Iranian named Lutfullah Shirazi. Instead of calling the location as Hajo, the inscription renames it "Shuja'abad".

== Cultural relation with Bhutan ==
A large number of Bhutias used to visit Hajo as devotees. The Bhutias perform the ritual as their own faith, but not allowed to enter the main place of worship. The belief among the Bhutias that the image of Hayagriva-Madhava was earlier in a monastery in Lhasa from where a Brahmin brought it to Hajo.

=== Others ===
There is a big pond known as Madhab Pukhuri near the temple. Doul, Bihu and Janmastami festivals are celebrated every year in the temple.

Sayani, the first wife of Kalia Bhomora Borphukan of the Ahom kingdom donated a plot of land and other gifts to the Hayagriva Madhava temple during the reign of Ahom king Kamaleswar Singha.

== Politics ==
Hajo is part of Barpeta (Lok Sabha constituency). BJP's Suman Haripriya is the current MLA of Hajo (Vidhan Sabha constituency).

== Notable people ==
- Bishnuram Medhi, former Chief minister of Assam

== See also ==
- Hajong
- List of Hindu temples
