= Bhairabi Temple =

Hindu temple in India

Shri Shri Bhairabi Temple
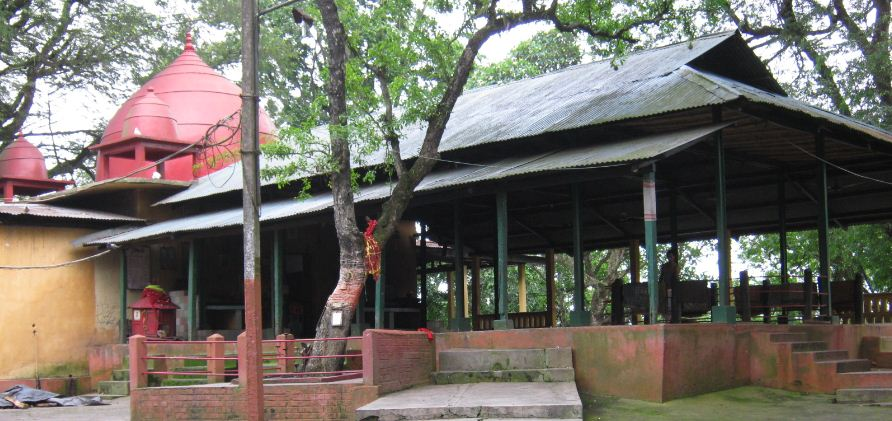
- A view of Bhairabi Temple

Religion
- Affiliation: Hinduism
- District: Sonitpur
- Deity: Bhairabi
- Festival: Durga Puja

Location
- Location: Kolibari, Tezpur
- State: Assam
- Country: India
- Interactive map of Shri Shri Bhairabi Temple
- Coordinates: 26.6185°N 92.8190°E

Architecture
- Creator: Banasura
- Temple: One
- Inscriptions: Sanskrit

The Bhairabi Temple is located on the outskirts of Tezpur of Sonitpur District in Assam, India.

== History ==
The Goddess Bhairavi is worshipped here as she is one of the Mahavidyas of Maa Durga Devi. The backdrop of the temple is a view looking towards the Kolia Bhomora Setu across the Brahmaputra River. The temple site is also locally known Bhairabi Devalaya. Legend has it that Usha (daughter of mighty Asura King Banasura) regularly came here for the worshipping of the Goddess. About a couple of kilometres away lie the Bamuni Hills where one can view the ruins of the palace that stood many centuries ago. The art work on stone carvings that were used within the structure are from the 9th century. Likewise, the 400-year-old Bhairabi temple has tilted slightly and a nearby building suffered damage to the west and south sides of the second and third stories and cracked the pillars and an unhinged roof due to an earthquake. Following the damage, religious ceremonies or daily prayers have come to a halt.

== Geography ==
Bhairabi temple is situated close to Bharali river.

== Management ==
The temple is managed by the government through the office of the District Deputy Commissioner and the temple belongs to the family of the Borthakur's of Tezpur (Shri Dilip Borthakur, Shri Barenya Ranjan Barthakur, and Shri Aditya Prakash Barthakur). There are sacrificial offerings of goats, ducks, pigeons, etc. that still occur regularly here. The Durga Puja celebration is performed within this temple.

The entrance to the temple is through a long staircase that leads up from the approach road to the temple itself. There are numerous facilities for the purchase of ghee lamps, sweets, fruits, and etc, that are offered during prayers for blessings. The temple is a sidhapitha where people offer prayers and fulfill their wants with the blessings of Maa Bhairabi.

== See also ==
- Mahabhairav Temple
- Category:Hindu temples in Assam
- Tezpur
- Agnigarh
- Dah Parvatiya
