= Tourism in Assam =

Assam, shaped like a soaring bird with wings

Assam is the main and oldest state in the North-East Region of India and as the gateway to the rest of the Seven Sister States. The land of red river and blue hills, Assam comprises three main geographical areas: the Brahmaputra Valley which stretching along the length of the Brahmaputra river, the Barak Valley extending like a tail, and the intervening Karbi Plateau and North Cachar Hills. Assam shares its border with Meghalaya, Arunachal Pradesh, Nagaland, Manipur, Tripura, Mizoram and West Bengal; and there are National Highways leading to their capital cities. It also shares international borders with Bhutan and Bangladesh and is very close to Myanmar. In ancient times Assam was known as Pragjyotisha or Pragjyotishpura, and Kamarupa. The potential for cultural tourism in Assam to bring economic and social benefits to local communities is significant. By providing a platform for intercultural exchange, it not only boosts the state’s tourism industry but also contributes to the preservation and promotion of its indigenous languages and customs.

6th International Tourism Mart 2017 began in Guwahati on 5 December 2017.

== Major attractions ==
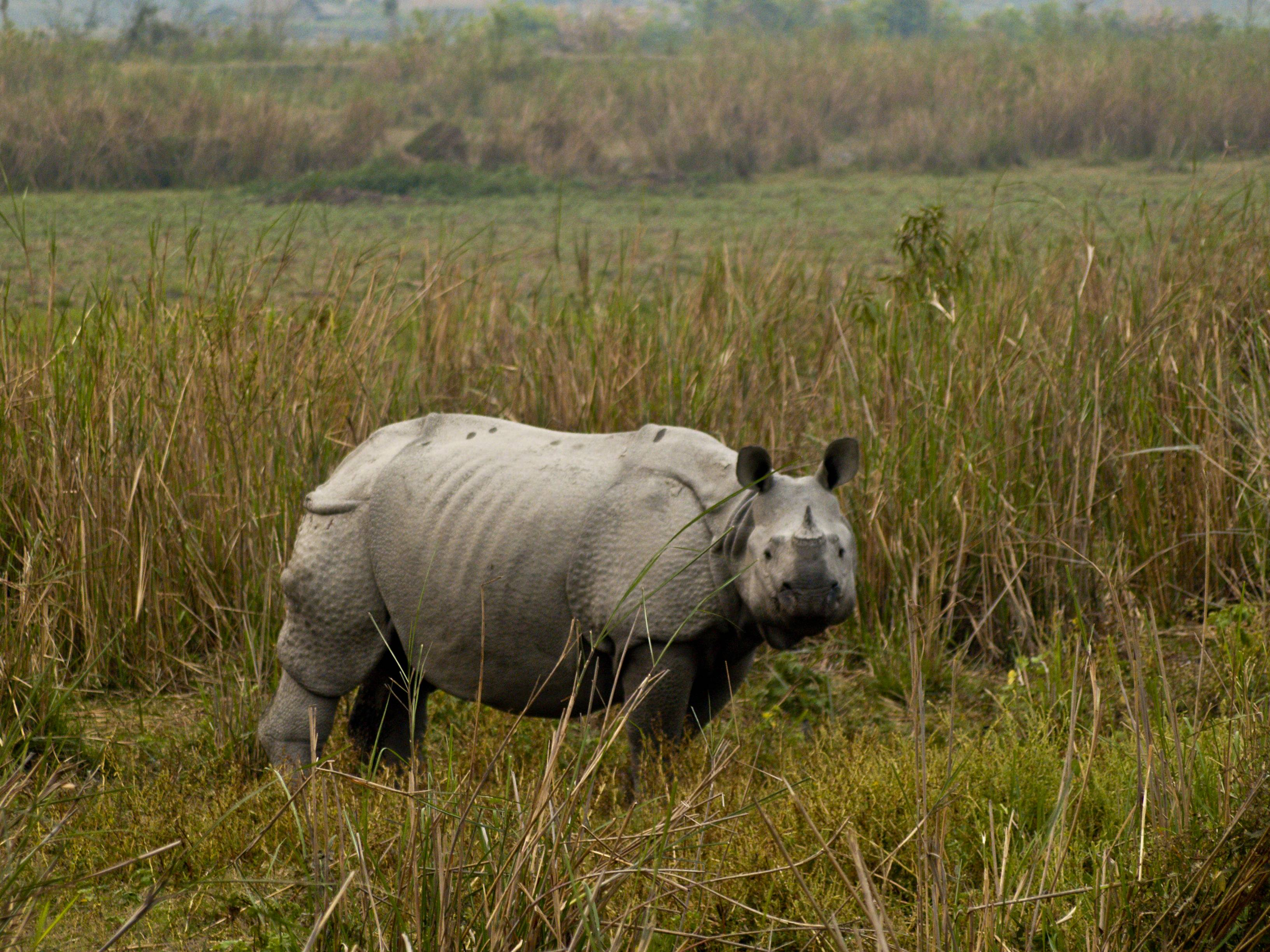
A rhino in Kaziranga National Park. The park is home to two-thirds of the world's great one-horned rhinoceroses.

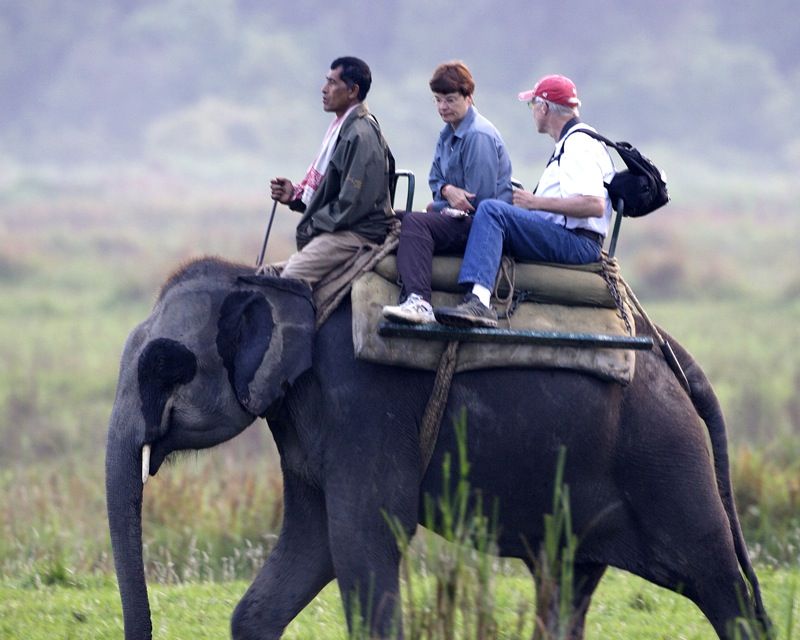
Elephant safari in Kaziranga National Park

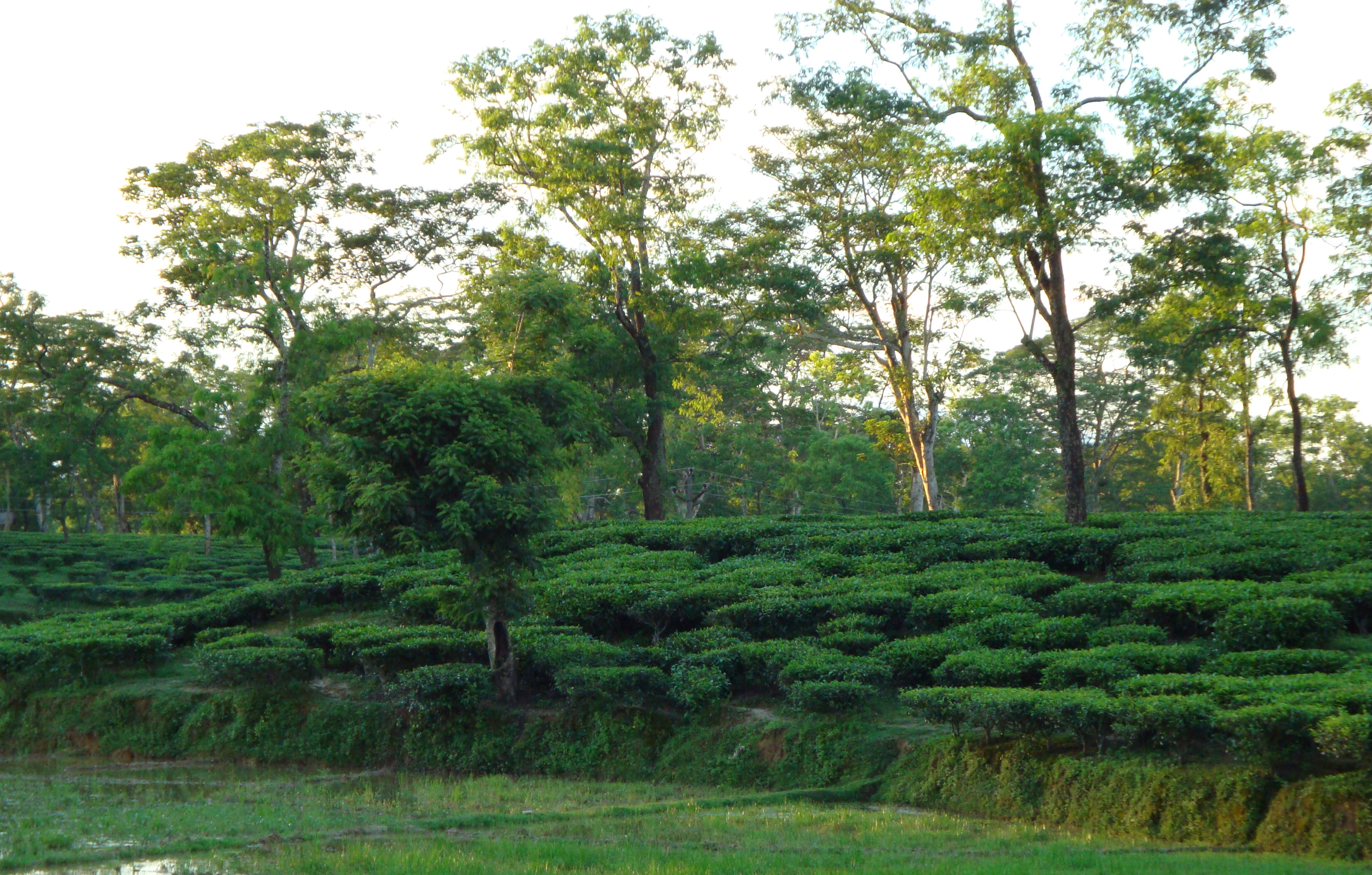
A scenic tea estate of Assam

For the purposes of tourism there are wildlife reserves like the Kaziranga National Park, Manas National Park, Pobitora Wildlife Sanctuary, Nameri National Park, Dibru-Saikhowa National Park etc.

Assam has a rich cultural heritage going back to the Ahom Dynasty which governed the region for many centuries before the British occupation.

Notable tourist destinations are listed below:

=== Guwahati ===
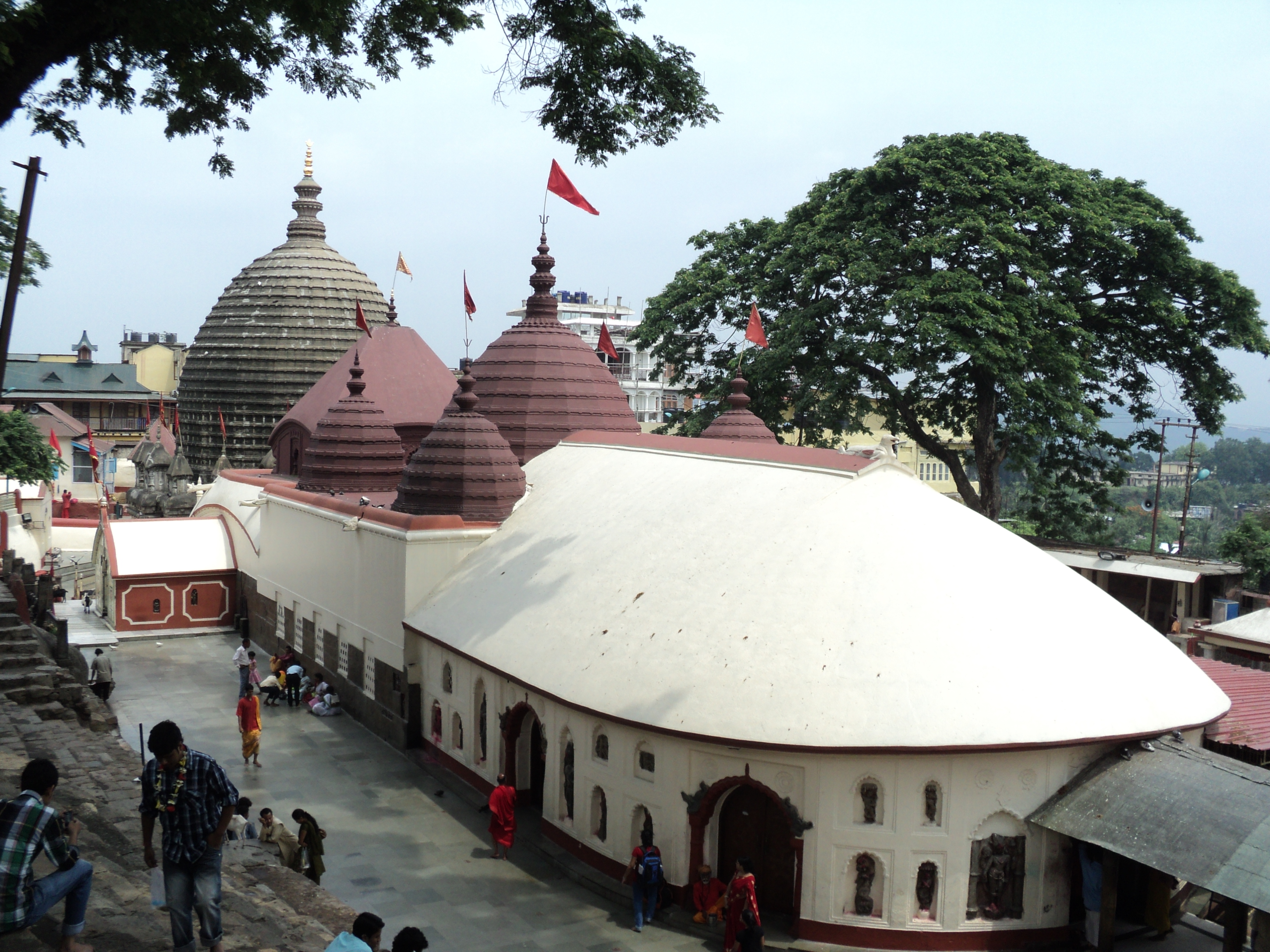
Kamakhya Temple

One of the key urban centres of Assam and the biggest city in North-East India, Brahmaputra, Shankardev Kalakshetra, Umananda Temple, Assam State Zoo, Shilpagram etc. Chandubi Lake, Sonapur, Madan Kamdev, Chandrapur and Pobitora Wildlife Sanctuary are other famous spots outskirts the city. While visiting Madan Kamdev, tourists also visit the ancient temple Gopeswar Mandir situated in the village Deuduar.

=== Majuli ===
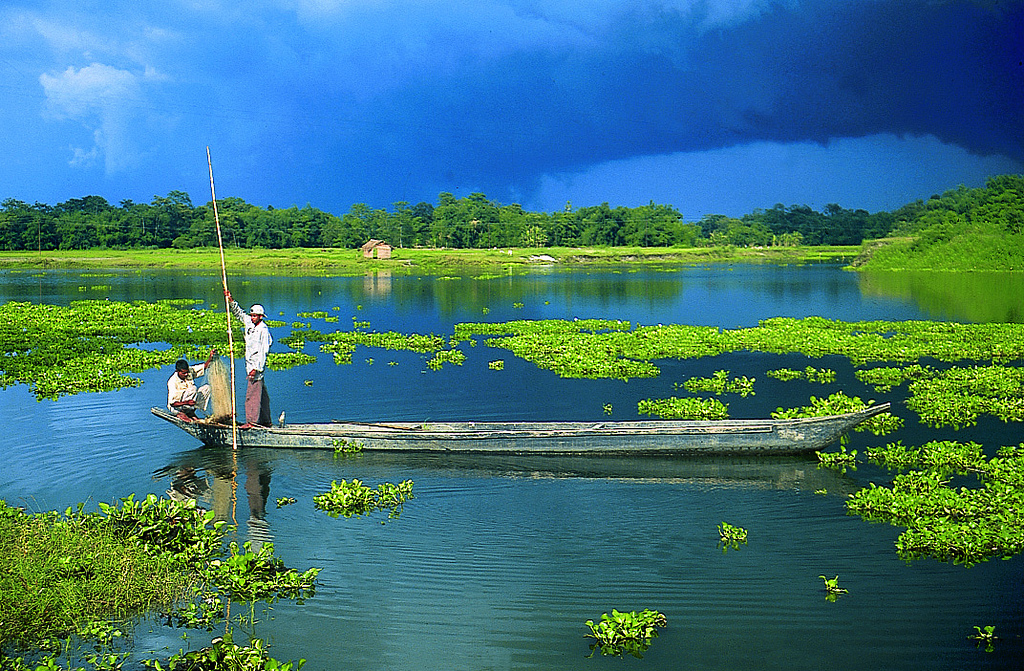
A view of Majuli

The largest freshwater island in South Asia on the Brahmaputra River. Majuli is famous for its Vaishnavite Satras such as Kamalabari Satra, Dakhinpat Satra, Garamurh Satra, Auniati Satra, Bengenaati Satra and Samaguri Satra.

=== Kaziranga National Park ===
This protected area is a UNESCO World Heritage Site and serves as one of the last remaining habitat of the Great Indian One-horned Rhinoceros. Also check out Manas National Park and Orang National Park.

=== Dima Hasao ===
Dima Hasao is a hill station district in Indian state of Assam, known or its hilly terrain natural landscapes & scenic beauty. Haflong is a hill town and often referred as the only hill station of Assam. The village of Jatinga is famous for phenomenon involving of birds that attracts scientific interest & visitors.Other notable tourist destinations in district are Umrangso, Panimur Falls, Maibang, Tumjang Trek at Selkal Peak etc.

=== Sonitpur ===
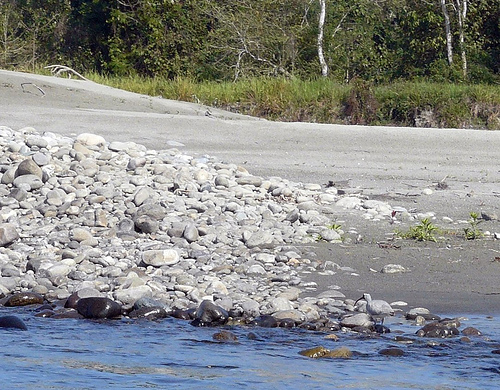
View of Nameri National Park of Sonitpur District.

Protected areas to see in the district are Nameri National Park, Bura-Chapori Wildlife Sanctuary, Sonai-Rupai Wildlife Sanctuary and a part of Orang National Park. Bhalukpong is also an important tourist place. Tezpur is a small town steeped in history and culture. Some of these are Agnigarh, Mahabhairav Temple, Chitralekha Udyan, Bamuni Hills, Usha Pahar etc. Biswanath Chariali town is 75 km away from Tezpur, is famous for the Biswanath Ghat, also called popularly as "Gupta Kashi".

=== Jorhat ===
A quickly growing urban centre, the last capital of Ahom kingdom and the cultural capital of Assam, Jorhat known for many historical monuments of Ahom era and heritage places built in and around the city during British Raj like Raja Maidam, Lachit Borphukon Maidam, Jorhat Gymkhana Club, Bura Sahib's Bungalow of Kaziranga Golf Resort, Thengal Bhawan etc. Pilgrimage sites like Dhekiakhowa Bornamghar, which was built by saint Madhavdeva and Borbheti are also the places to visit. Hoollongapar Gibbon Sanctuary (home of Hoolock gibbon), man-made Molai forest, Sui-ka-pha Samanway Kshetra, Jorhat Science Centre and Planetarium, Tocklai Tea Research Institute are the other attractions here.

=== Sivasagar ===
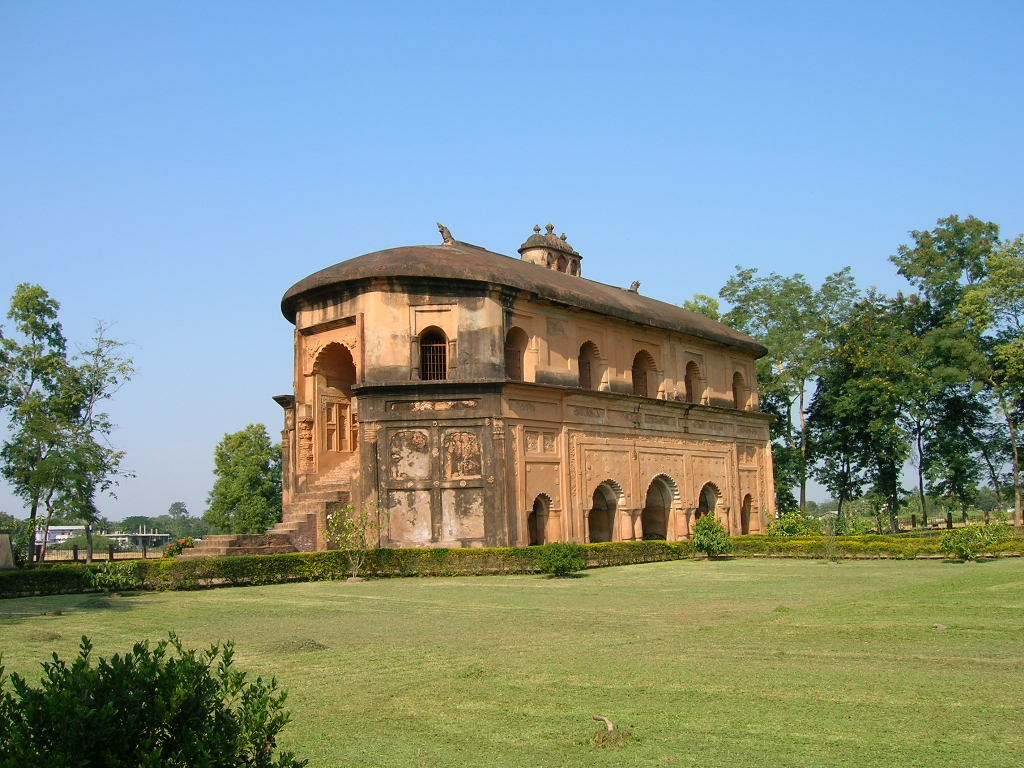
Rang Ghar

As Sivasagar was the seat of the Ahom Kingdom, it is surrounded by many ancient monuments of Ahom era. Those are Rang Ghar, Talatal Ghar, Sivadol, Gola Ghar, Kareng Ghar of Garhgaon, Joy Dol, Sivasagar Tank (Borpukhuri), Joysagar Lake, Gourisagar Lake, Joymati Maydam, Vishnu Dol, Devi Dol, Gourisagar Dol, Charaideo, Namdang Stone Bridge etc. Tai Museum and Uttaran Museum which exhibits the history of Ahom. Panidihing Bird Sanctuary, the abode of more than 250 species of birds.

=== Hajo ===
Hajo is an ancient pilgrimage centre for the religions Hinduism and Buddhism. Some of famous temples in hajo are Shree Hayagriv Madhavdev temple, Shree Kedar nath temple, Shree Kameshwar temple, Shree Ganesh temple & Shree Kamaleswar temple.Hajo

=== Tinsukia ===
Many prominent shopping malls are there in Tinsukia. Dibru-Saikhowa National Park, one of the biggest national parks in India are situated in Tinsukia. This national park is considered to be a biological hotspot. The Tilinga Mandir (Bell Temple) is a well-known temple situated in the outskirts of Tinsukia city. Digboi Refinery, Asia's oldest refinery is situated here. A railway park is recent addition to the city. Dehing Patkai Festival are annual festival held at Lekhapani in Tinsukia district. India's only coal museum is situated at Margherita town in Tinsukia district. Tribal communities in Tinsukia district have taken initiatives to promote ecotourism in the region. The Singpho Eco Tourist lodge in Margherita-Pengari road and the Faneng Village at Lekhapani are two such initiatives by the local tribal communities.

=== Dibrugarh ===
Dibrugarh is called the tea capital of the world. The town is situated on the edge of the Brahmaputra River. Set amidst extensive tea estates, Dibrugarh offers tourists the opportunity to experience a life in a tea estate. Recently, tea tourism has started becoming popular, with travel companies such as Greener Pastures and Purvi Discovery offering tea tours. Tipam is a famous tourist spot of Dibrugarh. Tipam is an ethnic village which is famous for its historical places. Besides Tipam, Dehing Patkai National Park is the other attraction. Presently the city has the biggest railway station in Assam with 18 Lines opened in 2009. Rajdhani Express Train Originate from Dibrugarh and Dibrugarh Town.

=== Udalguri ===
Other than the multitude of culture and tradition of the various ethnic communities, the district has several tourist places. Some of the important ones are Bathou Temple and Research centre, Namghars, Hanuman Temple, Bhairabkunda Picnic Spot, Gethsemane Man-made Forest (Bhairabkunda) and Bogamati.

=== Morigaon ===
Tourist destination of middle Assam in Morigaon district near Raha, Assam 4.5 km away near NH-37/AH National Highway 37 is Jungal Balahu named after the legendary Tiwa King. It is 6.5 km away from Chaparmukh Junction railway station, 130 km away from Lokpriya Gopinath Bordoloi International Airport. Near Nagaon town 27 km away.

== Practical Information ==
=== Weather & Rainfall ===
Assam has temperate weather with maximum of 35-38 °C in summer and a minimum of 6-8 °C in winter in low-lying areas, particularly the Brahmaputra Valley and Barak Valley. As one ascends towards the hilly areas, however, the mercury falls considerably in winters. Assam experiences high rainfall and humidity – afternoon thunder showers are a common occurrence during monsoons – and early morning fog in winter is also common.

=== Transportation ===
Arriving by Air: Guwahati's Lokapriya Gopinath Bordoloi International Airport is well-connected to the major cities in India. Taxi service, including prepaid services, is available at airports for transfers to the city. There are also airports in Silchar, Dibrugarh, Jorhat and Tezpur that run flights to Kolkata and other parts of the northeastern region.

Arriving by Rail: The three major routes of the North East Frontier Railway connected Assam to nodal stations in the rest of the country. Guwahati, Assam's largest railway station, is served by direct trains to New Delhi, Kolkata, Mumbai, Bengaluruuwahati.

Road: The Assam State Transport Corporation along with several private companies operates buses connecting Guwahati with Tezpur, Jorhat, Dibrugarh, Tinsukia, Silchar, Dimapur, Kohima, Imphal, Aizawal and Itnagar.

== See also ==
- Majuli Conservation by Jadav Payeng
- Tourist attractions in Manipur
- Tourism in North East India
- Assam – Attractive Destinations
- Protected areas of Assam
- List of Satras
- Dhola-Sadia bridge
- Deopahar
