= Mahaquizzer =

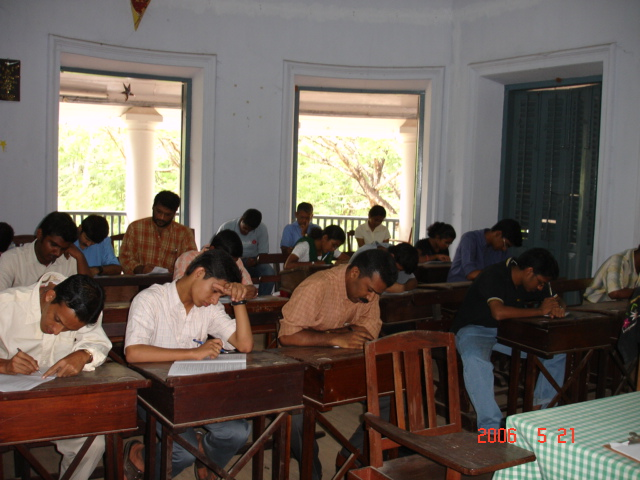
Mahaquizzer 2006 in Trivandrum

MahaQuizzer is an annual solo quiz contest held simultaneously across several Indian cities. It was instituted in 2005 by the Karnataka Quiz Association. The event is now held in Bangalore, Chandigarh, Chennai, Hyderabad, Thiruvananthapuram, Mumbai, Pune, Kolkata, New Delhi, Thrissur, Guwahati, Tezpur, Panjim, Bhubaneshwar, Mysore and Coimbatore. It is now a collaborative effort between KQA (which provides content and administrators) and other quizzing organisations such as Quiz Foundation of India, Chennai, K-Circle, Hyderabad, The Hyderabad Quiz Club, Bombay Quiz Club, The Boat Club Quiz Club, Pune, Grey Cells Kerala, Bhubaneshwar Quiz Club, Kutub Quizzers, New Delhi, Trivia Bytes Creations and Oo Aa Ka Kha, Guwahati, Sunday Evening Quiz Club, Goa, and Coimbatore Quiz Circle, Coimbatore and has thus evolved into being the national quizzing championships.

== The Contest ==
MahaQuizzer was envisaged as a quiz that would test the contestant's ability to make informed guesses rather than his/her memory. It typically features 150 text-questions, which must be answered in 90 minutes. The questions normally run into several sentences and may contain clues as well as misdirections. Participants fill in their answers, and no negative marking is applied. The quiz is normally set by a team of four senior quiz-masters.

Prizes are awarded to the best contestant in the School, college, Ladies and Open categories in each venue. The overall winner takes the title of Mahaquizzer and is awarded the Wing Commander G.R. Mulky Memorial Trophy for Quizzing Excellence. A list of the top 100 contestants is published.

== 2005 ==
The inaugural edition was held on 12 June 2005 at Bangalore, Chennai, Hyderabad, Thiruvananthapuram and Mumbai. 335 contestants attempted the quiz. Anustup Datta, a quizzer from Bangalore, took the title in a closely fought contest.

== See also ==
- Quizzing in India
