= Usha (princess) =

Daughter of Banasura and wife of Aniruddha in Hinduism

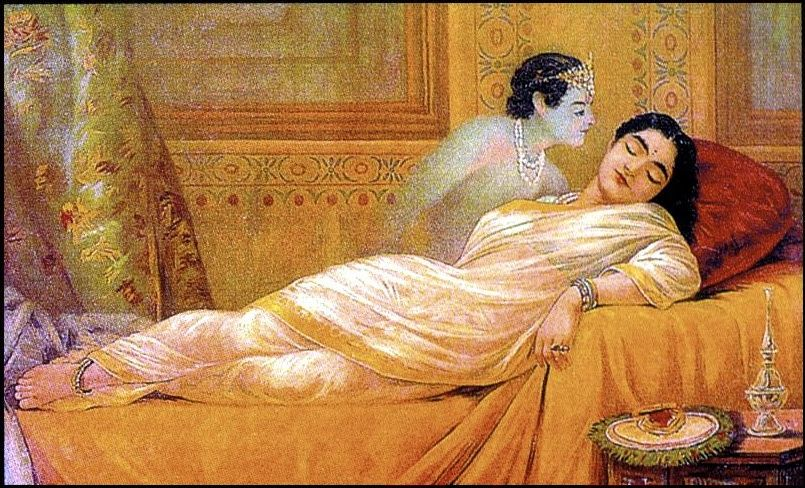
- Usha dreaming of Aniruddha by Raja Ravi Varma
- Texts: Bhagavata Purana, Vishnu Purana, Shiva Purana, Mahabharata

Genealogy
- Born: Shonitapura
- Parents: Banasura (father); Ambavati (mother)
- Spouse: Aniruddha
- Children: Vajra
- Dynasty: Yaduvamsha (by marriage)

Usha (Sanskrit: उषा, IAST: Uṣā) is a character in Hindu history. She is the daughter of the asura king Banasura and the wife of Aniruddha, the grandson of Krishna. Her story of falling in love with Aniruddha and wedding him is described in the Bhagavata Purana.

== Legend ==
Banasura, ruling his kingdom from the city of Sonitapura, was the son of Bali and the grandson of Prahlada. Banasura was a great devotee of Shiva and as a result of a boon granted to him from the deity, had gained 1000 arms. Intoxicated by his prowess, he observed to Shiva that he was the latter's equal, and that he had attempted to fight elephants, but the creatures had grown terrified of him. Shiva, enraged by his words, spoke thus: 'Your flag will be broken, oh fool, when your pride is vanquished in a battle you have with someone like me.'

One day, Usha saw a young man in her dream, had sex with him, and fell in love with him. Chitralekha, a friend of Usha a talented artist, helped Usha to identify the young man seen in her dream by sketching various portraits of the Vrishnis. Usha realised that she had dreamt of Aniruddha, the grandson of Krishna. Chitralekha, through her yogic powers, shrunk Aniruddha to the size of a doll, abducted him from the palace of Krishna and brought him to Shonitapura.

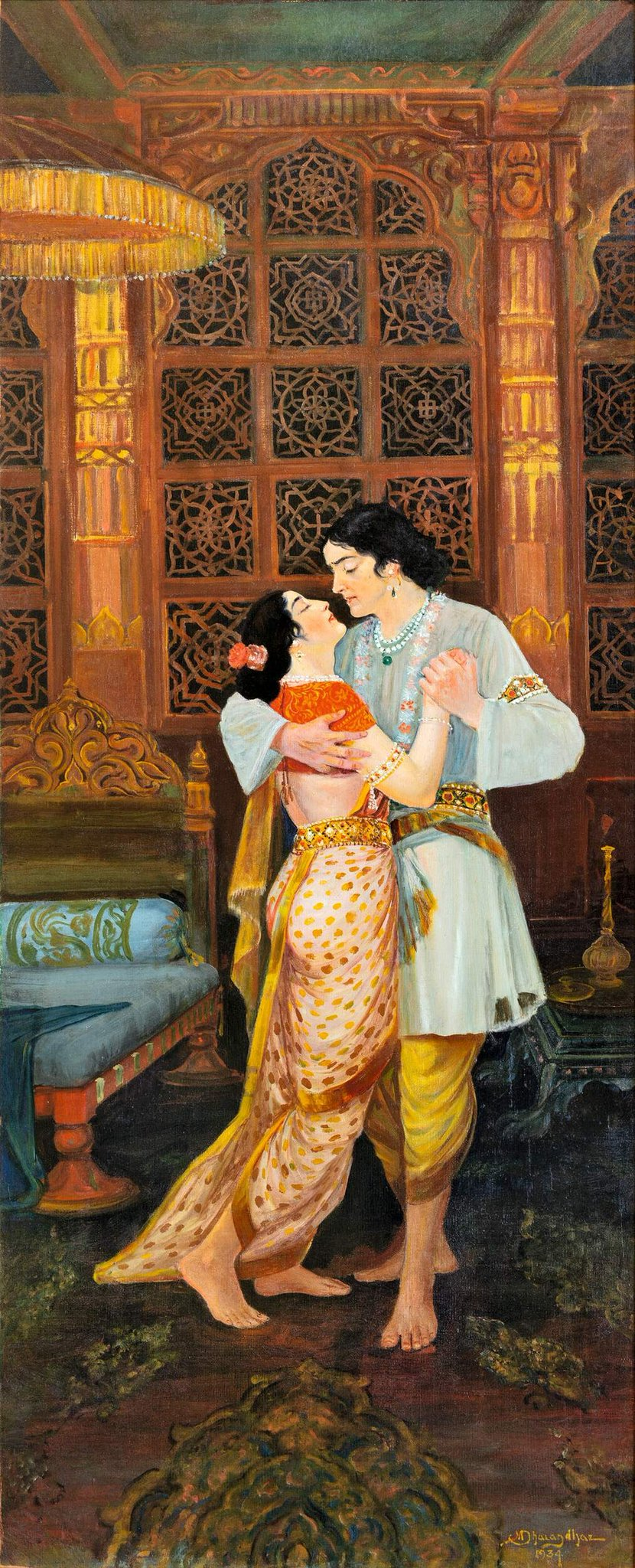
Union of Usha and Aniruddha by M. V. Dhurandhar, c. 1934

Usha worshipped her lover and furnished him with priceless garments, garlands, fragrances, lamps, and with beverages, dishes, and words. Breaking her vow of chastity with him, she kept him hidden in her maiden quarters, and the lovers lost track of the days. Catching wind of his daughter's activities, Banasura rushed to her chambers to find her playing dice with doll sized Aniruddha. Even as the prince fended off the guards, Banasura subdued him with the mystical ropes of Varuna due to Aniruddha's shrunken state. Usha was overwhelmed with sorrow due to this incident. Aniruddha was held captive by Banasura for a month, until Narada informed the Yadus in Dvaraka, who were searching for Aniruddha.

The Yadus' army attacked Banasura in a great battle. When the Yadu princes and their army besieged his kingdom with 12 akshauhinis, surrounding it completely. Banasura staged a fierce counterattack. During the war, Shiva appeared on the battlefield, riding on Nandi, to protect his devotee, Banasura. Balarama fought against Banasura's commander, while Samba fought against Banasura's son. To bear witness, the leaders of the godly souls headed by Brahma came in their celestial vehicles, as also the sages, the perfected souls, and the venerable personalities, the singers and apsaras of heaven, and the yakshinis. Krishna and Shiva faced each other. Krishna used a brahmastra against Shiva's brahmastra, a mountain weapon against a wind weapon, a rain weapon against a fire weapon, and his narayanastra against Shiva's pasupatiastra. Kartikeya, assaulted by Pradyumna's arrows, fled the battlefield on his peacock. After duelling with Satyaki, Bana took up arms against Krishna. However, Krishna blew his conch and instantly, Banasura's charioteer was killed and his chariot broken and shattered. In a desperate attempt to save Banasura, Kothara, his mother, stood naked before Krishna with her hair dishevelled. When the deity looked away, the asura fled to the city. When Shiva's forces had been defeated, Jvara, the embodiment of Shiva's fever, bearing three heads and three feet, attacked Krishna with scorching heat. Krishna produced his own Jvara of frigid coldness, and the two fought each other. Overwhelmed by Vishnu's fever, Shiva's Jvara offered its surrender and obeisance to Krishna and departed.

Meanwhile, Balarama defeated Banasura's commander. Bana rode forth upon his chariot to fight with Krishna, and the latter fought back with his Sudarshana Chakra. When Krishna started chopping Banasura's arms, Shiva returned to his senses and extolled the glories of Krishna, not to kill Banasura, whom he had bestowed with fearlessness. Obliging, Krishna replied that he had never intended to kill Banasura, since he was the son of Bali and the grandson of the devout Prahlada. Vishnu had promised Bali not to kill any member of his family, and therefore would not slay him. However, Krishna severed Banasura's extra arms to destroy the latter's pride, leaving Banasura with only four arms.

Banasura realised his mistake and bowed his head before Krishna, arranging for a chariot to seat Aniruddha and Usha for their wedding in Dvaraka.

=== Rebirth ===
According to the Bengali text Manasamangala Kavya, Usha and Aniruddha were reborn as Behula and Lakshmindara in the next life and married each other again.

== In popular culture ==
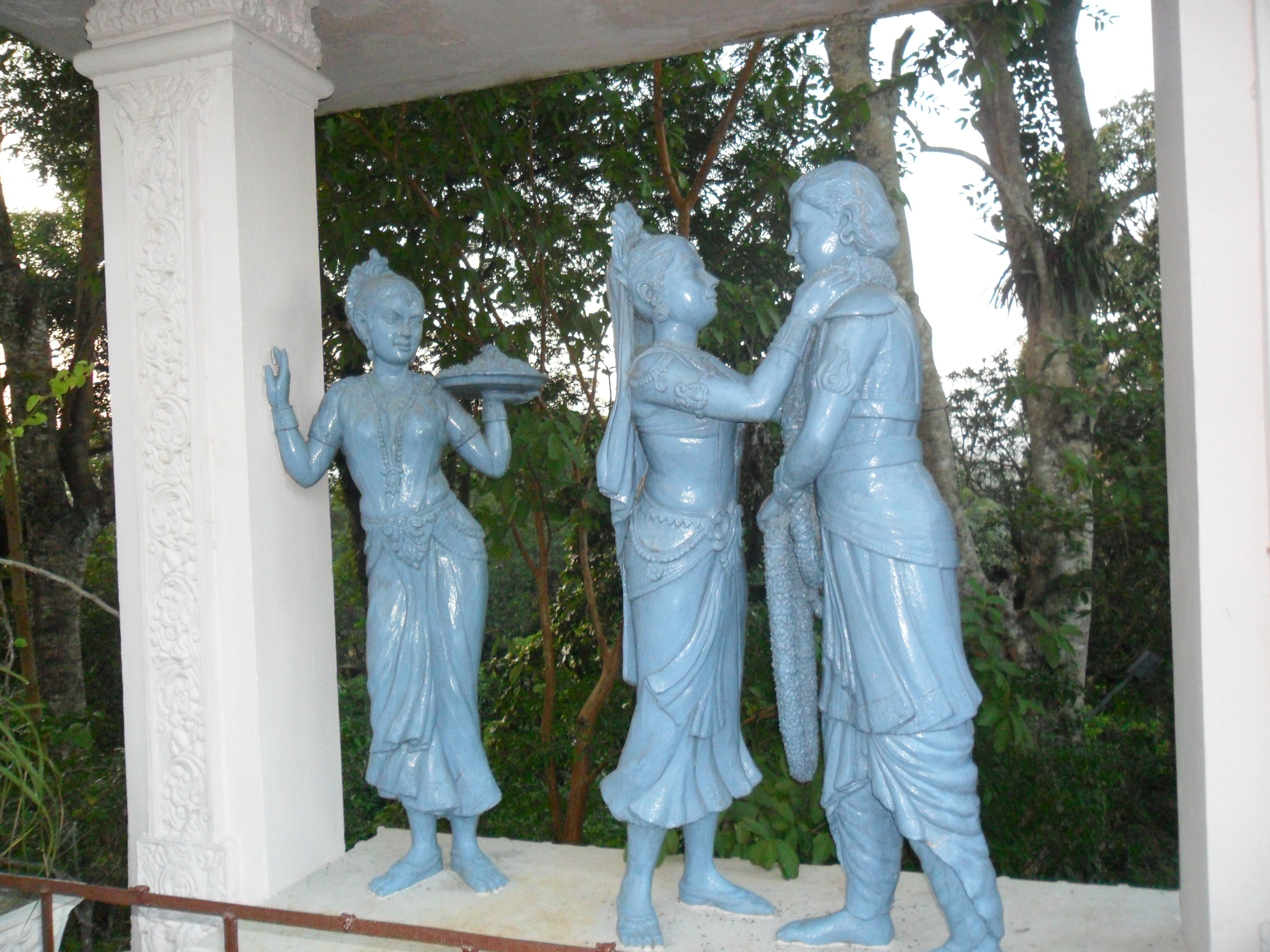
Sculpture of Usha-Aniruddha Wedding on Agnigarh hillock

The story of and Usha (as Okha in Gujarati) is depicted in the 18th century Gujarati Akhyana entitled Okhaharan by Premanand Bhatt.

A 1901 Telugu language play titled Usha Parinayam written by Vedam Venkataraya Sastry was based on story of Usha. The play was also taken as a Telugu film in 1961 by Kadaru Nagabhushanam under Rajarajeswari films.

Usha Kalyanam is a 1936 Tamil-language film directed by K. Subramaniam.
