= National Highway 715 (India) =

National highway in India

National Highway 715
- Map of National Highway 715 in red
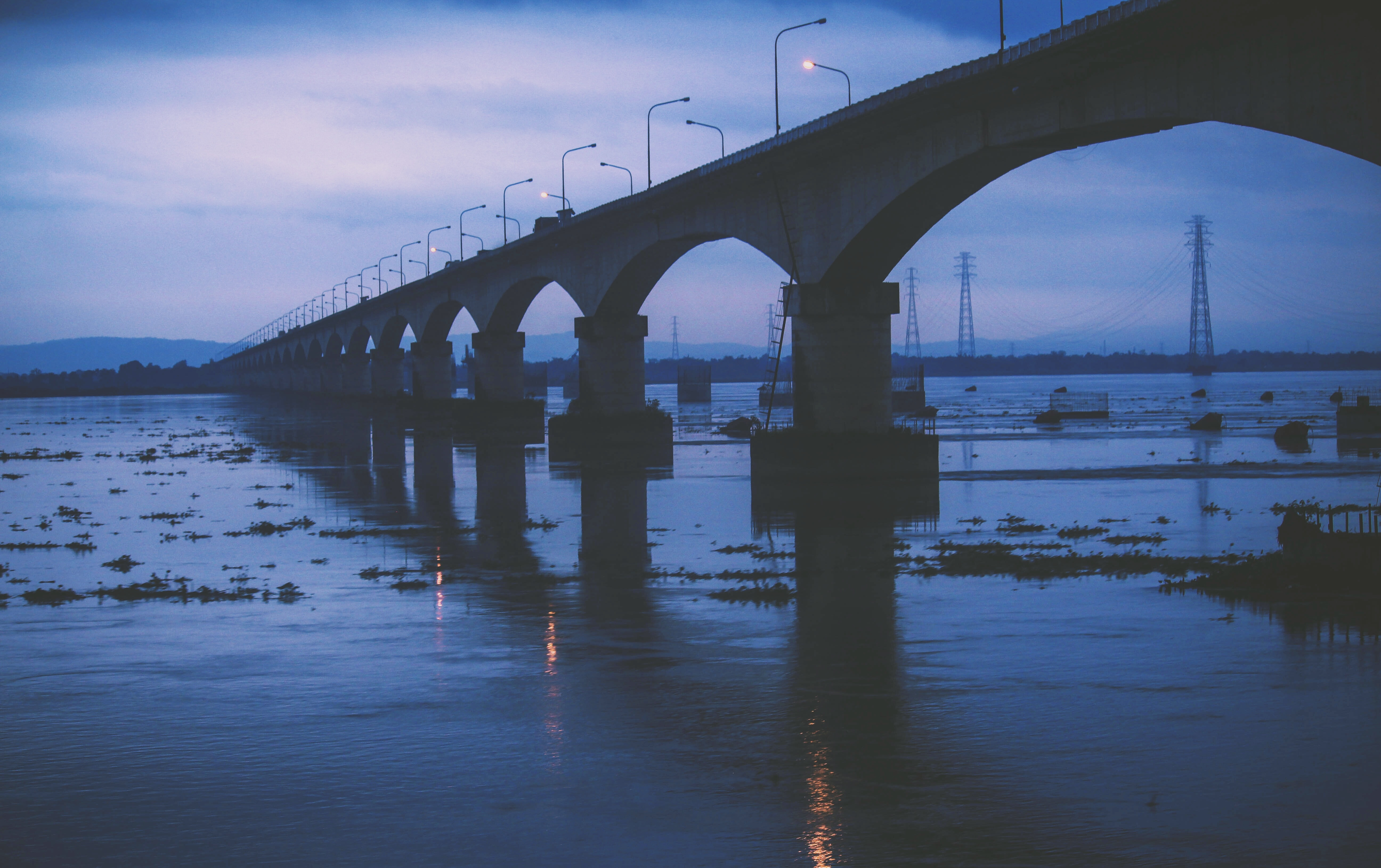
- NH 715 traverses the Kolia Bhomora Setu bridge

Route information
- Length: 197 km (122 mi)

Major junctions
- From: Tezpur
- To: Jhanji

Location
- Country: India
- States: Assam
- Primary destinations: Kaliabor – Jakhalabandha – Bokakhat – Jorhat

Highway system
- Roads in India; Expressways; National; State; Asian

National Highway 715 (NH 715) is a National Highway in India. It connects Tezpur and Jhanji in Assam.
