= Tezpur Municipal Board =

Type
- Type: Municipal Board
- Term limits: 5 years

Structure
- Seats: 19 Ward Commissioners
- Political groups: Government (11): BJP

Elections
- Last election: March 2023
- Next election: 2027

Meeting place
- Tezpur, Assam

The Tezpur Municipal Board is the municipal body which governs and maintains the town of Tezpur in the Indian state of Assam. Tezpur is the fourth populous urban settlement in the state after the cities of Guwahati, Dibrugarh, Silchar

== History ==
The Tezpur Municipal Board was established in 1894 under the Municipal Act, marking the formal recognition of the town as a municipal entity. Initially, the board covered an area of 2.75 square kilometers, which has since expanded to 7.10 square kilometers. The board has a council of 19 elected ward commissioners.

== Chairpersons and Deputy Chairpersons ==
=== List of Chairpersons ===
Year	Chairperson	Party	Remarks
	Padmanath Gohain Baruah		1st Non-European Chairperson of TMB
2022	Pragyano Bhattacharya	BJP	Incumbent

=== List of Deputy Chairpersons ===
Year	Deputy Chairperson	Party	Remarks
2022	Sangeeta Ghosh	BJP	Incumbent

== Ward Commissioners ==
2022 Assam Municipal Elections
Ward No.	Councillor	Party	Votes	Margin
1.	Late Sher Alam	Ind		
2.	Prof.Joy Sankar Hazarika	BJP		
3.	Amarendra Sarma	Ind		
4.	Ishan Borah	BJP		
5.	Dibyajyoti Das	AGP		
6.	Suman Das	INC		
7.	Ramen Tamuli	BJP		
8.	Priyalata Devi	BJP		
9.	Joshi Nath Saha	BJP		
10.	Paras Nath Ray	AGP		
11.	Rumi Bhagawaty	BJP		
12.	Sangeeta Ghosh Bose	BJP		
13.	Debasree Bhowmick	BJP		
14.	Sanjay Ghosh	BJP		
15.	Pragyano Bhattacharya	BJP		
16.	Santana Biswas	BJP		
17.	Madhushmita Hazarika Deka	BJP		
18.	Dipa Mani Saikia	BJP		
19.	Rinku Mani Lahkar	BJP		

== See also ==
Tezpur Assembly constituency
