= Baptist Christian Hospital Tezpur =

- Emmanuel Hospital Association, New Delhi

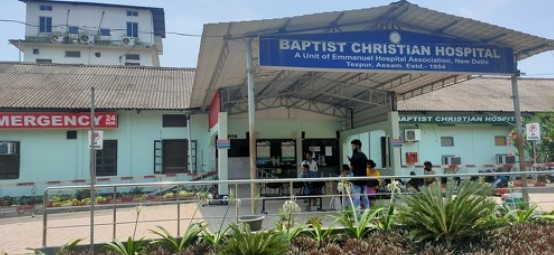
- Fellowship for transformation through caring.

Geography
- Location: Tezpur, Sonitpur district, Assam, India

Organisation
- Care system: Private
- Type: Secondary Care Hospital

History
- Founded: 1954; 72 years ago

Links
- Website: www.bchtezpur.org

Baptist Christian Hospital Tezpur
- Founder: Dr. Charles Merchant
- Director: Dr. Asolie Chase
- Campus: Suburban

Baptist Christian Hospital (BCH) is a multi-specialty healthcare institution located in Tezpur, Assam, India. It offers a wide range of specialties, including emergency medicine, critical care, pediatrics, obstetrics and gynecology, general surgery, internal medicine, orthopedics, and community health. It is also home to the School of Nursing, Baptist Christian Hospital, which has been training nursing professionals since 1954.

== History ==
In the early 1950s, Baptist Christian Hospital (BCH) began as a small dispensary run by Dr. Charles C. Merchant, a Christian missionary from the Baptist General Conference USA. Working with local leaders and the conference board, Dr. Merchant developed land purchased for a hospital. A 30-bed hospital was opened to serve the population in 1954. In April 1954, a School of Nursing was opened. In 2024, it had a capacity of 130 beds. Baptist Christian Hospital was founded with the mission of delivering quality healthcare services to rural and underserved populations in Assam. Since its inception, the hospital has played a pivotal role in improving healthcare accessibility in the region.

Over the years, BCH has expanded its medical facilities, infrastructure, and educational programs to meet the growing healthcare needs of the community. The School of Nursing, established in 1954, continues to train professional nurses.

== Services ==
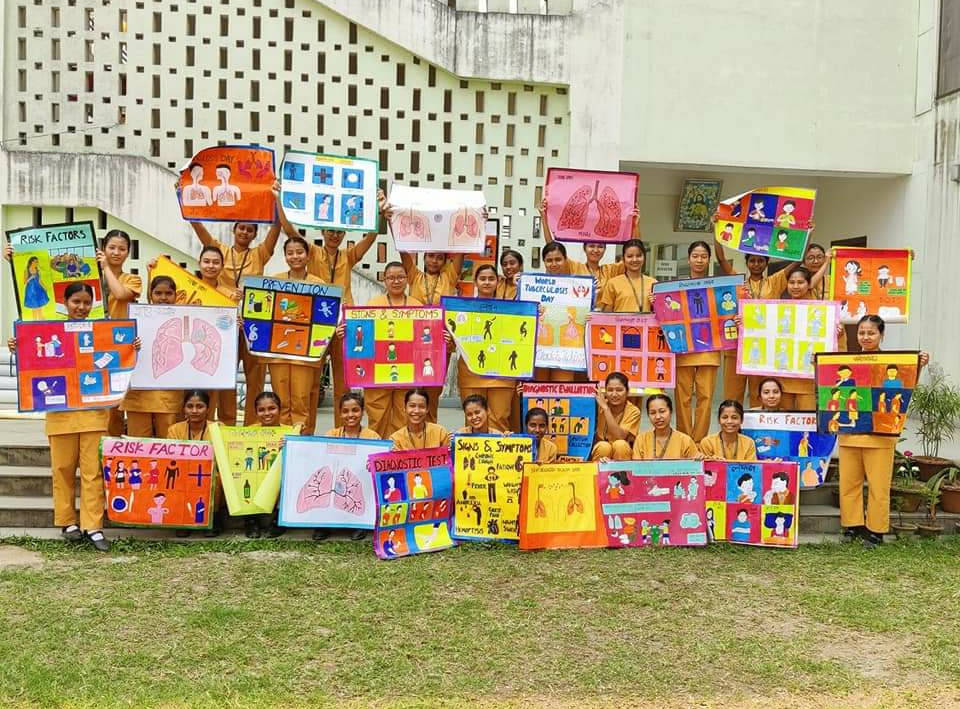
Student activities

The Baptist Christian Hospital offers a variety of services, including:

i- Clinical Services

- General Surgery
- Open & Laparoscopic
- General Medicine
- Orthopedics
- Obstetrics/Gynecology
- Dermatology
- Pediatrics
- Anesthesia
- Dentistry
- Physiotherapy
- Accident and Emergency Services- 24-Hour Service
- Outreach Services/Camps
- Immunization Services
- Dedicated Stoke Unit
- Mobile Stroke Unit
- High Dependency Unit (HDU)
- Pediatric Intensive Care Unit (PICU)
- Palliative Care Services
- Digital Dispensary (At Udalguri)

ii- Diagnostic Services

- Pathology
- Microbiology
- Biochemistry
- Virology
- Radiology
- Automated Laboratory – 24-Hour Service
- Digital X-Ray Services – 24-Hour Service
- Ultrasonography
- CT scan
- Endoscopy
- ECG

iii- Other Services

- Pharmacy (24-Hour Service)
- Community Health Department
- Research
- Hospital Dietary Services to Inpatients
- Back Up Electricity Supply – 24 Hours
- Canteen

== School of Nursing ==
The School of Nursing, Baptist Christian Hospital, was established in April 1954 by Ms. Arlene Jenson and Ms. Betty Pierson, Christian Missionaries from the Baptist General Conference (BGC) USA. The school's main objective was to train nurses who could contribute to improving healthcare delivery in the region. The founding of the school marked an important milestone in the field of nursing education. In its inaugural year, the School of Nursing admitted its first batch of six students. The General Nursing and Midwifery (GNM) program offered by the school is recognized by the Assam Nursing Council and the Indian Nursing Council.

During the training period, students are posted in the parent hospital (Baptist Christian Hospital). However, they also get opportunities to gain clinical experience outside of their parent hospital, including clinical postings/exposure at institutions like LGBRIMH (Lokopriya Gopinath Bordoloi Regional Institute of Mental Health), the Tezpur Cancer Centre and Makunda Christian Leprosy & General Hospital.
