= Agnigarh =

Legendary hillock

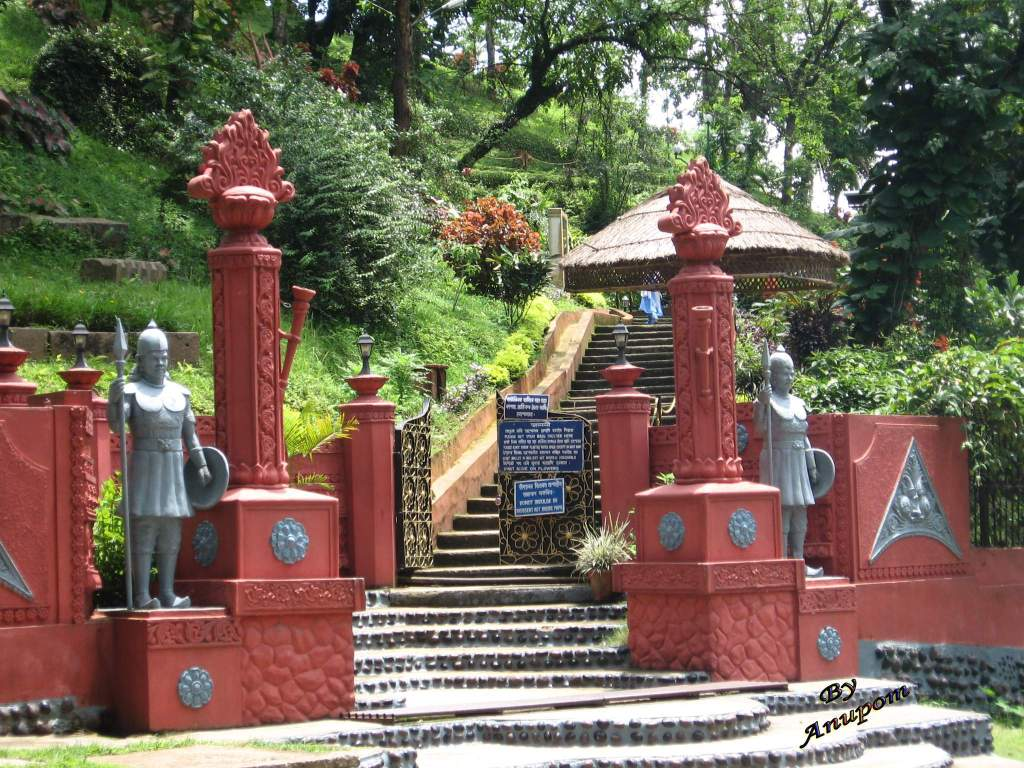
- Entrance of the Agnigarh hill
- Interactive map of Agnigarh
- 26°37′02″N 92°48′08″E
- Location: Tezpur, Sonitpur district, Assam, India
- Part of: Assam

History
- Built by: Unknown

Site notes
- Management: Government of Assam

Agnigarh (Pron:/ægɪˈgɑː/) is a hillock located in Tezpur, Assam, India. In Hindu scriptures, it is the site of the fortress which was built by Banasura to keep his daughter Usha in isolation. The name itself is derived from the words 'Agni' (meaning fire) and 'garh' (meaning fortress or wall) in Sanskrit.

== Legend ==
Legend has it that this fortress was surrounded by fire at all times so that nobody could go in or out of the perimeter without permission. Usha fell in love with Aniruddha in her dreams, not knowing that he was the grandson of Krishna. Her companion Chitralekha identified him by painting his portrait from Usha's description. Chitralekha Udyan in Tezpur also known as 'Cole Park,' the biggest park in Tezpur, is named after her. Chitralekha was not only an artist but one possessing mystical powers. Anirudddha was Krishna's grandson and Usha, the daughter of an Asura king, therefore was no way any side would consent to their love. She fled one night and brought Aniruddha to Usha's place while he was still sleeping, using her powers. When Aniruddha opened his eyes and saw Usha, he fell in love immediately. However, Banasura was furious on knowing this, and tied him with snakes and imprisoned him. Krishna, however had agreed for their marriage and had wanted for Banasura to consent for the same. Banasura was a great devotee of Shiva, and as a boon had asked him and his entire family to guard the gates of his city, Tezpur. He was not afraid of Krishna's wrath. A war ensued between the Hari (Krishna and his followers) and the Hars (Shiva and his followers), rivers of blood flowed and the city was named Tezpur (City of Blood). Both sides were nearly wiped out and a final battle followed between Shiva and Krishna; eventually, Brahma requested both of them to stop the war by putting him between them. A discussion followed in which Krishna made Shiva see that Banasura was acting wrongly in imprisoning his grandson, and had even disrespected Shiva himself in asking him and his family to be his gatekeepers. Shiva agreed, and Banasura was brought. Fearing his life he immediately agreed to the marriage.

Sculptures depicting the battle between Krishna and Shiva

The stone sculptures on the Agnigarh hill portray this story of love and great war.

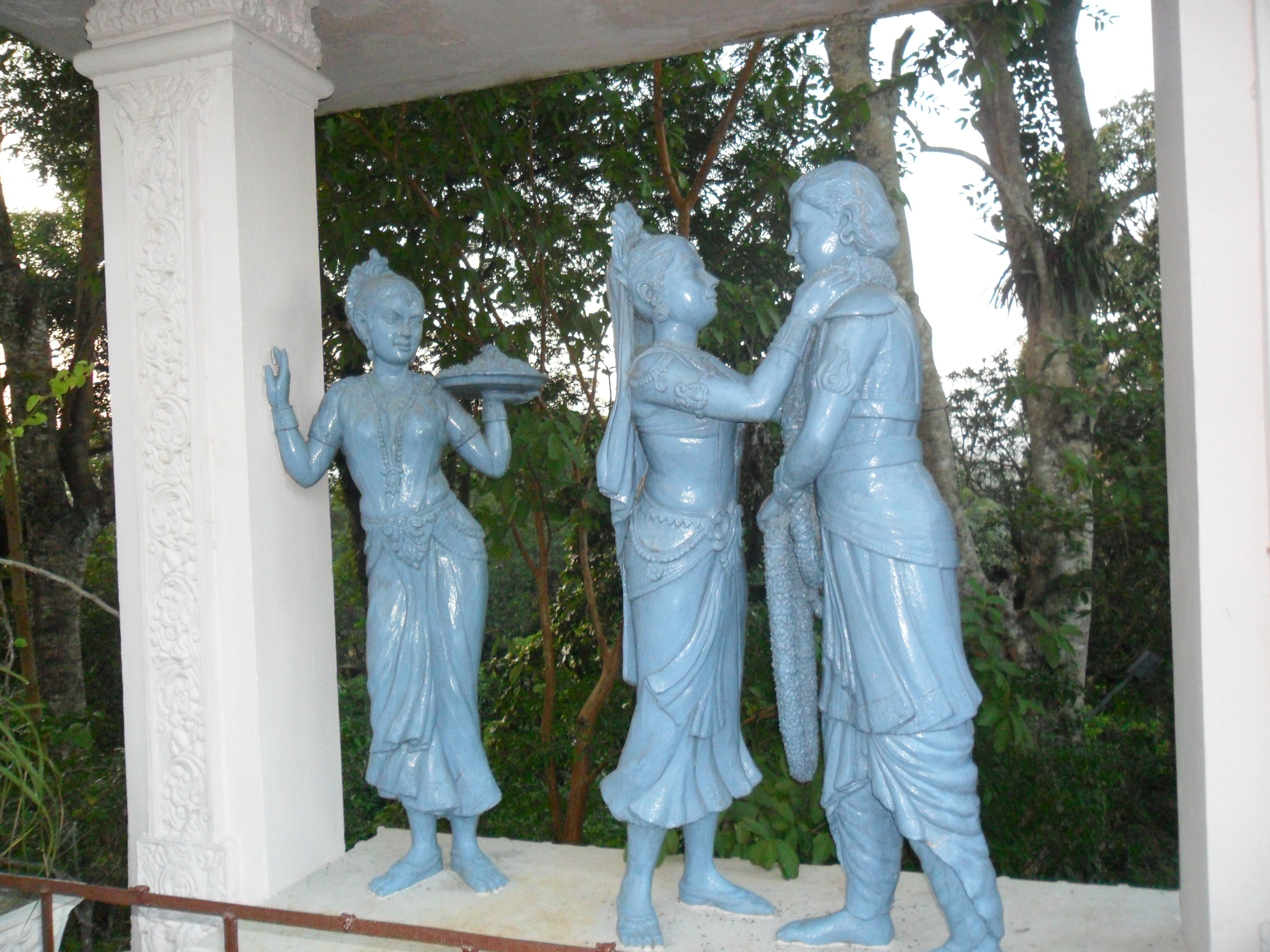
Sculpture of Usha-Aniruddha Wedding

== Current state ==
Present day Agnigarh is a hill on the banks of the Brahmaputra which is one of the big tourist attractions in Tezpur. There is a circular stairway leading up to the crest of the hill where there are now sculptures depicting Usha's abduction of Aniruddha, the grandson of Krishna and the ensuing battle by Krishna to free them. There is a tall viewing platform from where the entire Tezpur town can be seen.

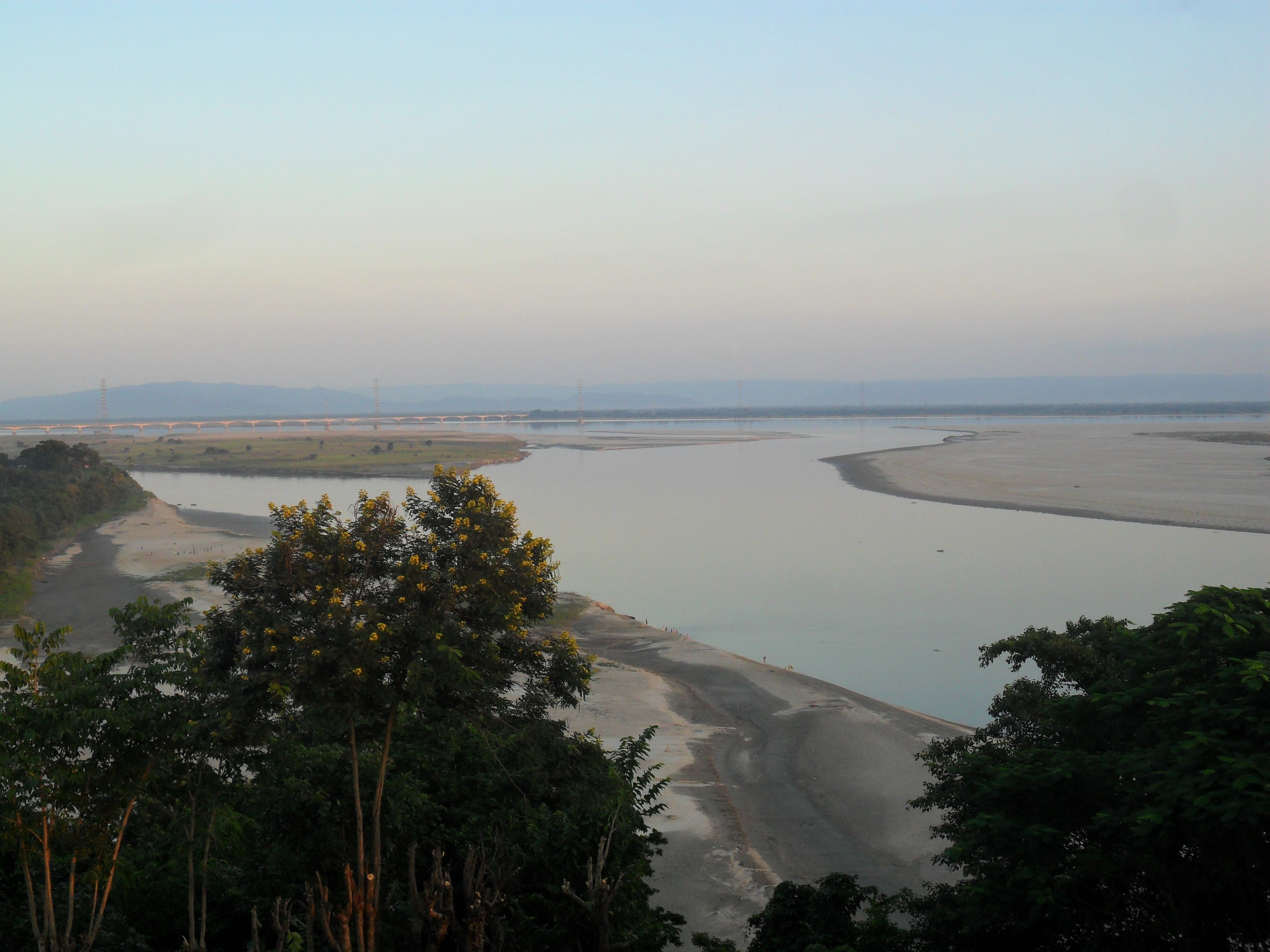
View of Brahmaputra from Top of Agnigarh

== Gallery ==
Lord Shiva- Lord Krishna War, Sculpture on Agnigarh (Tezpur)

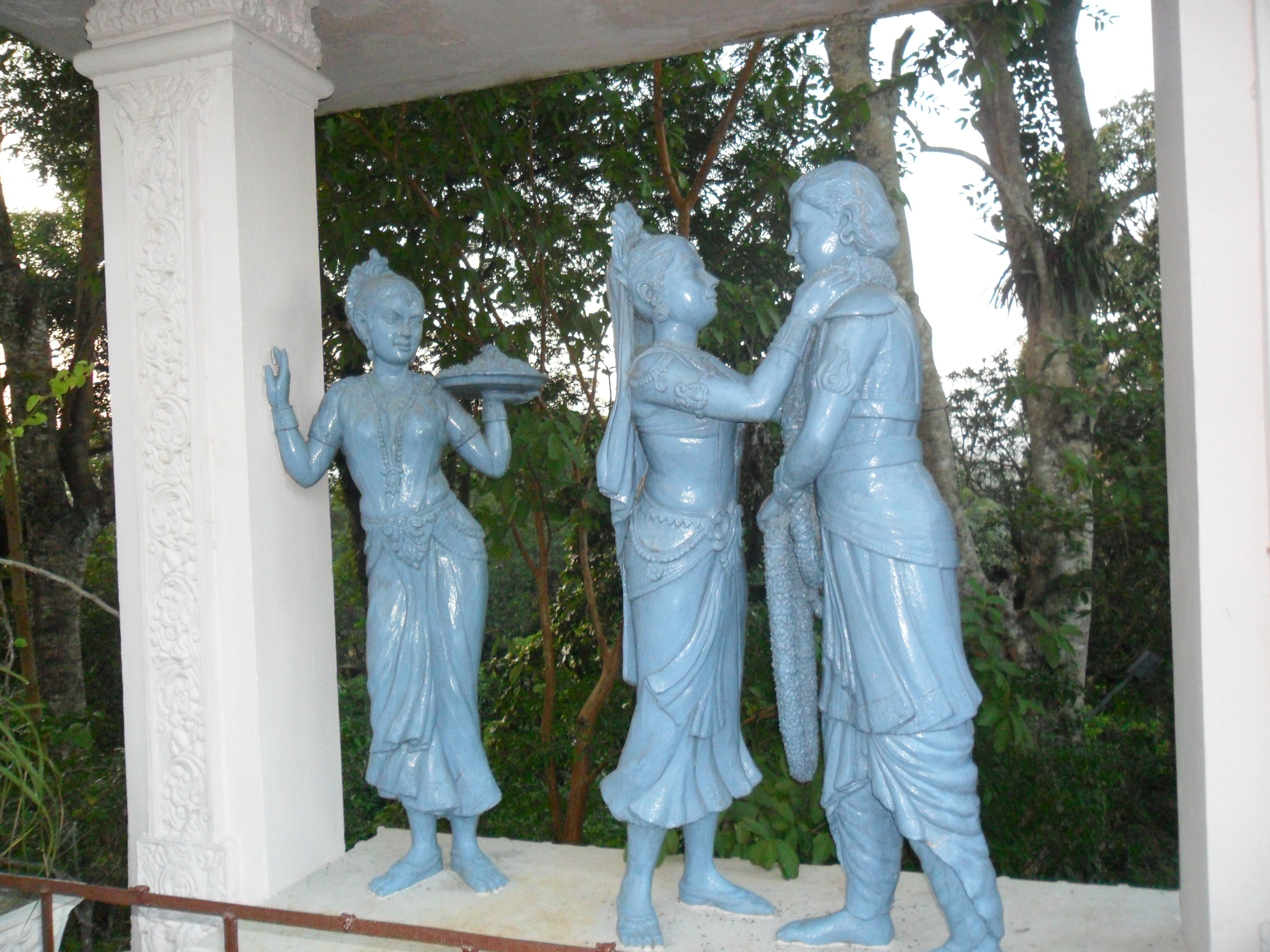
Sculpture of Usha-Aniruddha Wedding

== See also ==
- Banasura
- Chitralekha
- Usha
