= Chitralekha Udyan =

Park in India

- Interactive map of Chitralekha Udyan
- Type: Picturesque park
- Location: Tezpur, Sonitpur, Assam, India
- Opened: 1906; 120 years ago

Cole Park, Tezpur is a very picturesque park near the centre of Tezpur. Later it was renamed Chitralekha Udyan although both names are synonymous. The name is after a famous character in Aniruddha- Usha love story.

== History ==
The park was built in 1906 by a British commissioner of Assam named Mr. Cole, and was later reconstructed by M.G.V.K Bhanu in 1996. Later Park was renamed as Chitralekha Udayan, after the famous mythological character Chitralekha who was known for her painting skills.

It has had a long tradition of hosting painting/drawing competitions for the nearby schools due to the various features it possesses. A replica of the famous Bhomoraguri inscription which recorded the ancient plans to build a bridge across the Brahmaputra where the current Kolia Bhomora Setu exists has been created in this park for public viewing. The park has facilities for paddle boating on the pond. It recently has added 'Bumping Cars' to its list of amusements. Primary viewing attractions for children are a jet-fighter model Valiant MIG 21 the first supersonic aircraft for the Indian Air Force capable of travelling at Mach 2 (with engines removed and fixed) and a large concrete-made map of India (states as before the year 2000).

There is a water feature in the form of a lake where small rowing and paddle boats are allowed.

== Gallery ==
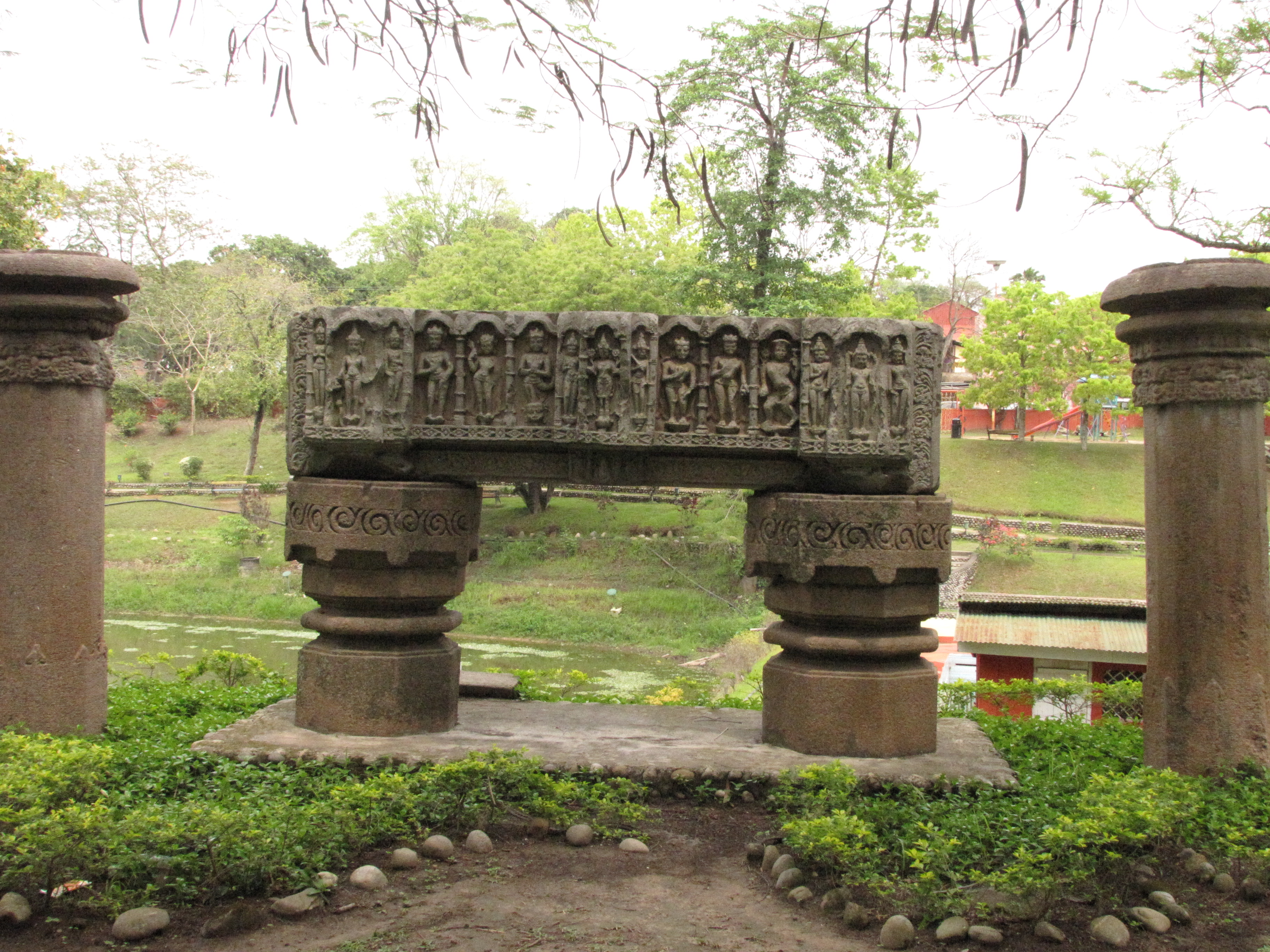
Ancient Stone pillars in chitra lekha udyan showing various deities

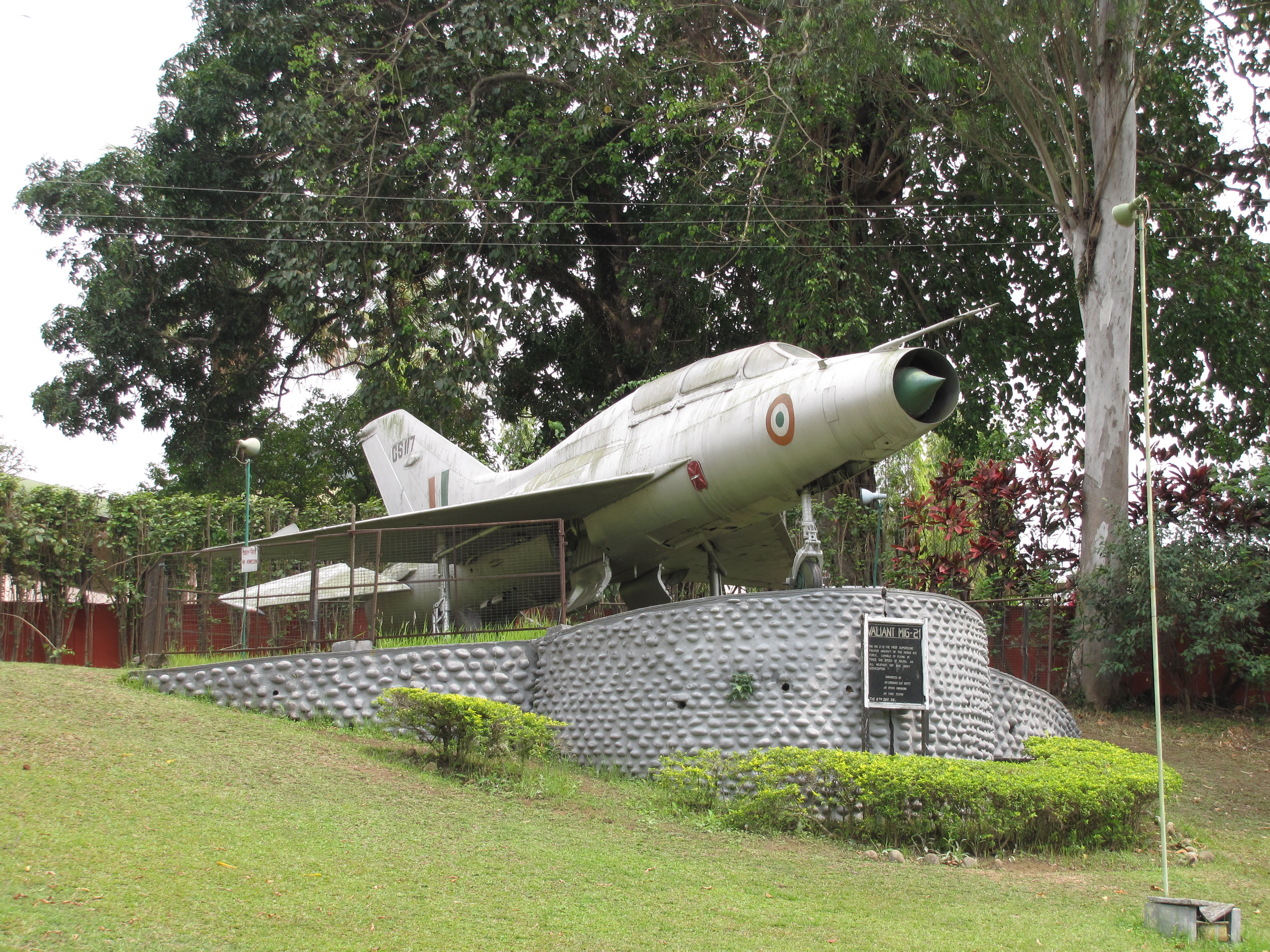
The jet fighter at Cole Park

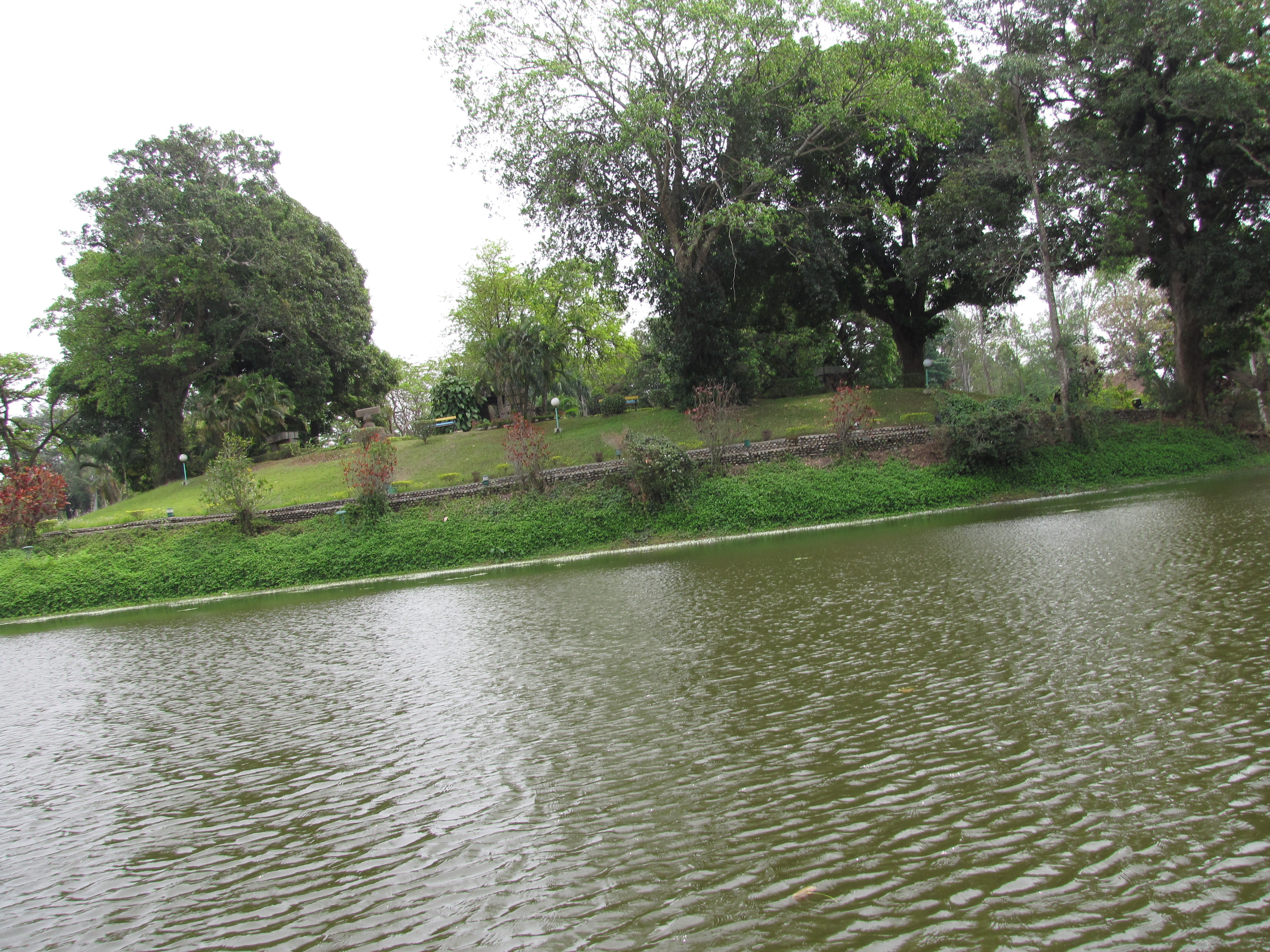
A large pond at Cole Park for paddle boating
