= Dah Parvatiya =

Da Parbatia
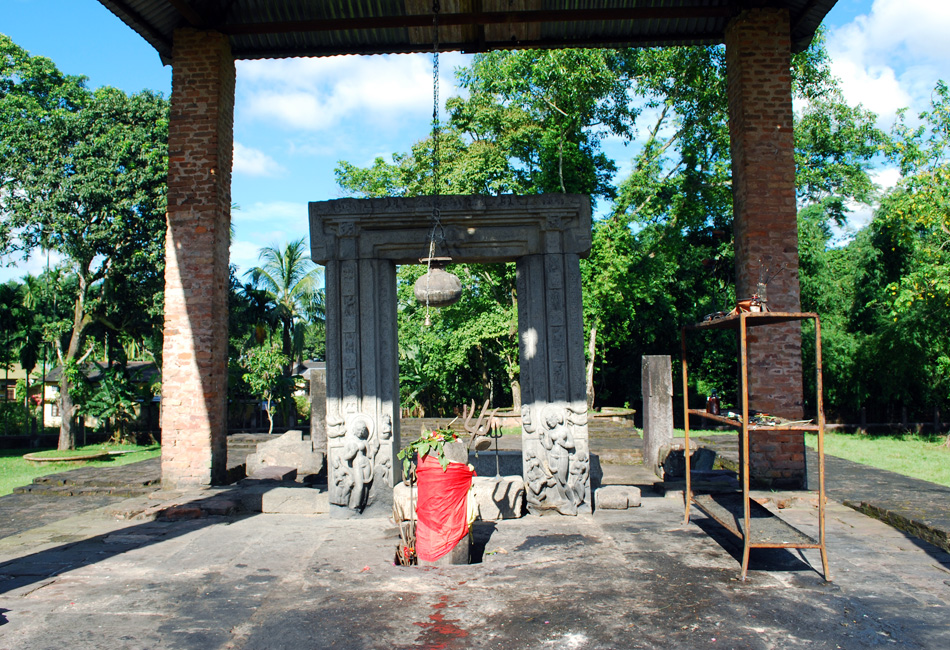
- The door frame of the Shiva temple at Dah Parvatiya village

Religion
- Affiliation: Hinduism
- District: Sonitpur
- Deity: Shiva and Vishnu

Location
- Location: Dah Parvatiya village, Tezpur
- State: Assam
- Country: India
- Interactive map of Da Parbatia
- Coordinates: 26.63°N 92.8°E

Architecture
- Monument: Two

Da Parbatia is a small village very close to west Tezpur, in the Indian State of Assam. In the village there are significant architectural remnants of an ancient temple of the 6th century overlying the ruins of another Shiva temple built of bricks during the Ahom period. Archaeological excavations done here in 1924 have unearthed a sixth-century antiquity in the form of a stone door frame with extensive carvings. The ruins of the temple built during the Ahom period are built over the ancient temple's foundations and are in the form of a stone paved layout plan of the sanctum sanctorum and a mandapa. This complex is under the jurisdiction of the Archaeological Survey of India and its importance and notability is recorded under the Ancient Monuments and Archaeological Sites and Remains Act 1958.

== Archaeological excavations ==
The Dah Parvatiya village, located to the west of Tezpur, was subject to archaeological excavations by the Archaeological Survey of India in 1924, and also during 1989–90. The excavations of many mounds have revealed structural features built of brick and stone; these are in various stages of decay. The excavations revealed many terracotta plaques in which human figures were shown in a sitting position.

== History ==
The antiquities found at the Dah Parvatiya are inferred to have been from a temple complex built during the 5th or 6th century, prior to the Bhaskaravarman period. On the basis of the mouldings and its architectural style it is inferred that the terracotta plaques are definitely not later than the 6th century; the altered form of motifs noted in Assam confirms this assessment. This type of architectural feature, particularly in the stylistics of figurines of the ruins, is seen in North India, in the temples of the Bhumra and Nachha Kuthara which belonged to the Gupta period. Further confirmation of the dating is provided by the carvings of the river Goddesses Ganga and Yamuna, which are also akin to the Greek architecture with striking similarity to the Hellenistic art. The decorative elements of the ruins also have close similarity with those seen in the temples of Orissa.

During the Ahom period, a Shiva temple was built with bricks over the ruins of an ancient Gupta period temple. When the Ahom period temple was destroyed during the Assam Earthquake of 1897, the remains of Gupta period temple were exposed but only in the form of a door frame made of stone. Epigraphic evidence and ancient literature found here, supplemented by the ruins seen scattered around the area, also confirms that in the pre-Ahom period Gupta art extended into the early Medieval period.

== Features ==
The excavated foundation of the temple of the Gupta period revealed the base of the garbhagriha (sanctum sanctorum) in a roughly square form measuring 8.925 feet (2.720 m) x 8.33 feet (2.54 m), which is enclosed by a circumambulatory passage leading to a colonnaded hall of rectangular shape, which is interpreted as a mantapa or outdoor pavilion. To the east of the mantapa is a mukhamantapa (front hall), which is of smaller size. In the open space of the garbhagriha there is a "stone kunda" or Vedi (altar) of 2.418 feet (0.737 m) x 2.66 feet (0.81 m) size with a depth of 5 inches (130 mm). It is also inferred from the exposed ruins that the original temple was built of bricks (of size 15 inches (380 mm) x 11.5 inches (290 mm) x 2.5 feet (0.76 m)) which were in use in the 5th century, with door frames and sill made of stone.

The door frame made of stone, which stands in front of a large block of stone with a square cavity that held the original linga, is the most important find here that has carvings which attest to the Gupta period art form. The architectural depictions on this door frame are akin to the Gupta architectural features in Northern India, deciphered in the archaeological excavations done by Sir John Marshall.

=== Doorjambs ===
The door jambs or posts (the vertical part of the door frame), which measure 5.25 feet (1.60 m) in height and 1.25 feet (0.38 m) in width, have high relief carvings in their lower parts while the upper parts have four vertical bands or strips carved in different patterns. The human figures carved at the base of the door posts are of the river goddesses Ganga and Yamuna, which belong to the Gupta period art traditions, and also depict carvings of flying geese. This architectural depiction is stated to be the "finest and oldest specimen of sculptural art in Assam". The goddesses carved in an elegant standing posture are shown with divine halos over their heads with each figure holding a garland in its hands. This type of depiction of goddesses on the door frames was prevalent in the medieval temples. Many smaller figurines are also carved as if in attendance to the main goddess. On the right door post, there are two female attendants, one is in a standing posture holding up a chamara or an umbrella while the second attendant is shown on bent knees and holding a flat tray filled with flowers. The carvings on the right door post are better preserved than those on the left. On the left door post, the two figurines standing in attendance flanking the goddess are not distinct. Here, there is also a carving of a naga in a kneeling posture carved to the right of the halo of the goddess; to the left of this depiction there are carvings of two geese.

Vertical bands

The vertical strips in each of the upper part of the door posts extend up to the lintel. The first strip, starting from the head of the naga or the nagi, is carved in the wavy pattern of a creeper and is filled with decorations of leaves pattern. The second band is like a lotus stem, out of which lotus leaves and different flowers emerge; the stem is supported at the base by two pygmy shaped figures. The third strip has embossed panels of human figures fronting ornamental leaves. This band is crowned by a vase with drooping decorative foliage. The vase is also decorated with a square shaped pilaster that terminates in a capital, which has a cruciform. The capital has carvings of a gana (attendant of Shiva). Decorative rosettes form the fourth strip.

=== Lintel ===
The lintel spanning over the door posts is 3.75 feet (1.14 m) in length and 1.25 feet (0.38 m) in breadth. The lintel is larger in size than the door-frame, extending a little on each side of the jambs. It is richly decorated with architectural carvings which are placed in a symmetrical form, similar to the architectural features seen in the fifth and sixth century temples in Pataliputra and Benares. Five Chaitya-windows (horse-shoe shaped) are carved in the front face of the lintel – three large and two small – with the figurine of a male with four arms carved in the extreme right window seated on a throne; two of its arms are damaged while one arm is seen holding Shiva's damaru. At the base of this throne there is a carving in the form of sea waves. The central window has a Shiva carving known as "Lakulisa", meaning Lord with the staff, a rope tied to its leg and is flanked by two mythical deities, called "suparna", anthropomorphic figures of a bird and man. Also seen in this window are two females figures. In another window is a depiction of man playing the flute, and with a hooded snake feature above his head. The window to the extreme right has carving of Surya, the Sun god, in a cross-legged posture holding a lotus flower. Two attendants are seen next to this figure, one is offering betel leaves (pan) while holding an ink pot in the other hand, and the second attendant is carrying a stick.

== Bibliography ==
- Banerji, R.D; Blakiston, J.F. (1925). "Annual Report Of The Archaeological Survey Of India". Dah Parbatiyapublisher= Government Of India.
- Barkataki, S. (1 January 1969). Assam. National Book Trust, India.
- Goswami, Kali Prasad (2000). Devadāsī: Dancing Damsel. APH Publishing. ISBN 978-81-7648-130-4.
- Prakash, Col Ved (1 January 2007). Encyclopaedia of North-East India. Atlantic Publishers & Dist. ISBN 978-81-269-0703-8.
- Ray, Asok Kumar; Chakraborty, Satyabrata (2008). Society, Politics, and Development in North East India: Essays in Memory of Dr. Basudeb Datta Ray. Concept Publishing Company. ISBN 978-81-8069-572-8.
