= Chitralekha (Hinduism) =

Painter and companion of Uṣā in Hinduism

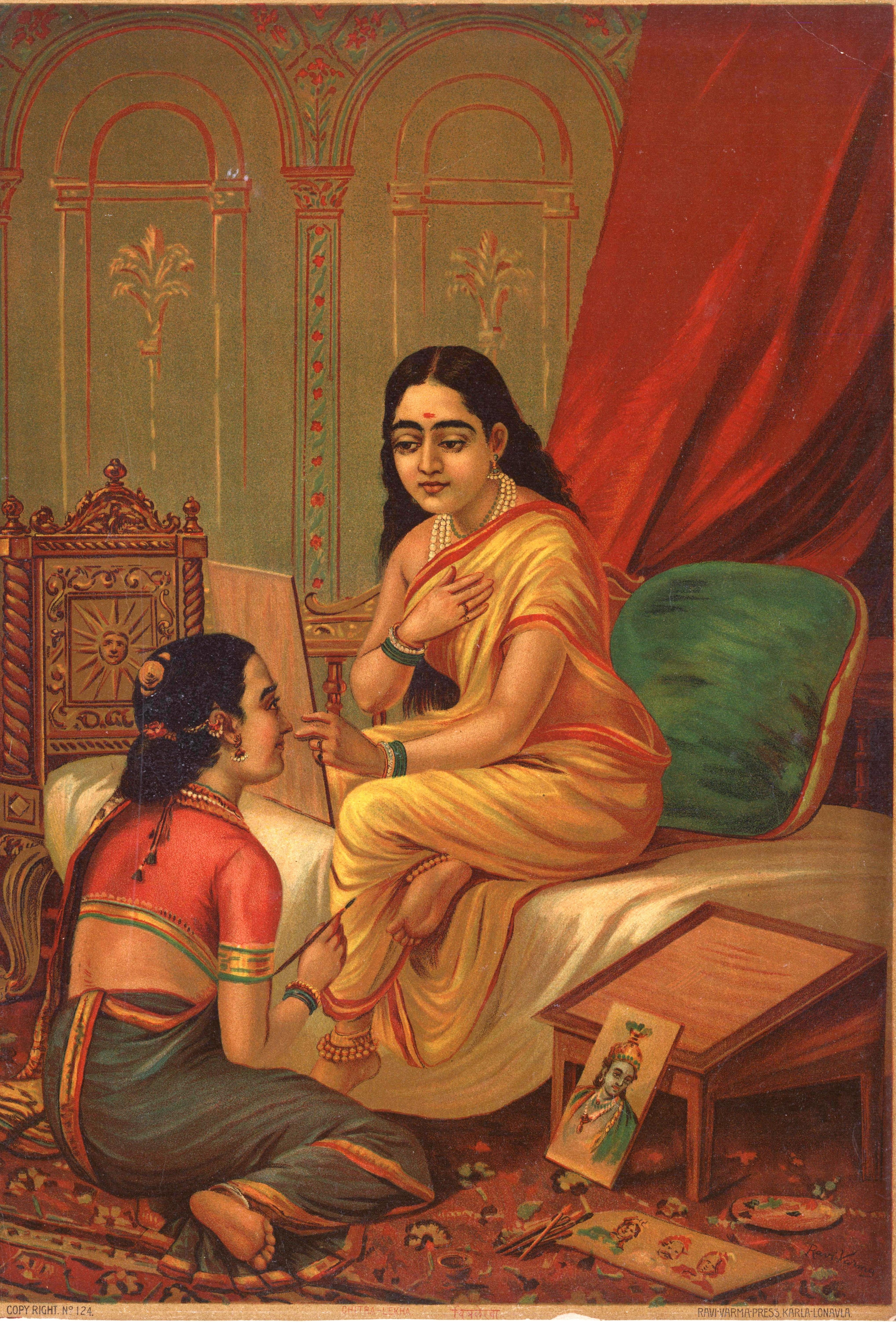
- Painting of Chitralekha, by Raja Ravi Varma
- Texts: Bhagavata Purana, Mahabharata (Harivamsa), Brahmavaivarta Purana

Genealogy
- Parents: Kumbhananda (father)

Chitralekha (Sanskrit: चित्रलेखा, romanized: Citralekhā) is a friend of Uṣā, and the daughter of a minister of Banasura, who ruled from his capital of Śoṇitapura. She employs her magical powers to unite Uṣā with her lover, Aniruddha.

== Legend ==
The daughter of Banasura, Uṣā, once dreamt of Aniruddha, the grandson of Krishna. Uṣā fell in love with the youth, despite not knowing his identity. The following morning, after hearing her friend's tale and observing her gloom, Chitralekha made portraits of many known charming princes, but Uṣā was unable to identify them as the youth of her dream. She then drew a portrait of Aniruddha, much to Uṣā's delight. Using her illusory powers, Chitralekha sought the protection of Narada, and then travelled by air to Dvārakā. After describing her friend's dream to the youth, she carried Aniruddha to Ūṣā's room, unnoticed by anyone in Śoṇitapura.
