= Mahabhairav Temple =

Hindu temple in India

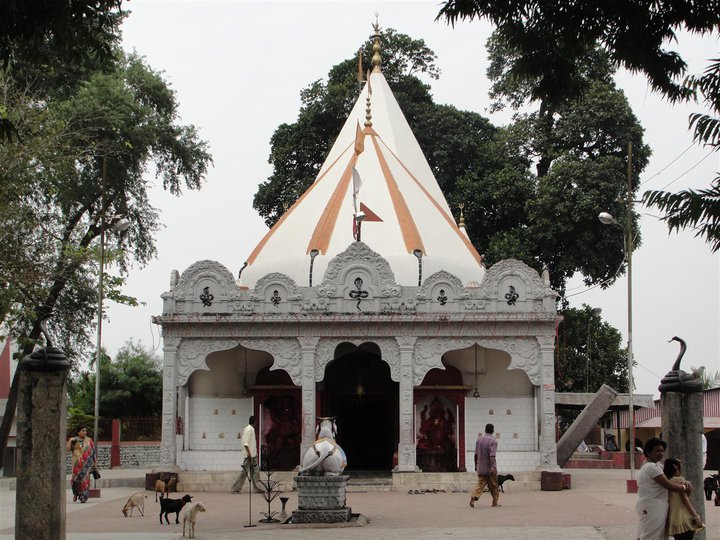
- Mahabhairab Temple, Tezpur.

Religion
- Affiliation: Hinduism
- District: Sonitpur

Location
- State: Assam
- Country: India
- Interactive map of Mahabhairav Temple
- Coordinates: 26°38′3″N 92°47′47″E

Architecture
- Established: 18th century
- Elevation: 80 m (262 ft)

Website
- www.mahabhairab.org

Mahabhairav Temple is a Hindu temple dedicated to Lord Shiva. It is located at a hillock on the northern part of Tezpur town in Assam, India. It is said that king Bana built this Shiva temple and originally it was built of stone but the present one was renovated and built with concrete.

The temple is now managed by the Government of Assam through a managing committee headed by the Deputy Commissioner, Sonitpur. Maha Shivaratri the annual festival of Shaivite branch of Hinduism is celebrated in the temple complex with devotees coming from far and wide. Laddu laced with Bhang, an edible preparation of cannabis and also mixed with milk and spices, are offered as prasad to Lord Shiva as per the rituals. Various puja are also conducted at this temple, pigeons are also freed that symbolises that spirit of ancestors are being liberated.

== Legend ==
The temple is dedicated to Lord Shiva and built by King Banasura. The Shiva linga of this temple is said to be made of 'Living Stone' which grows over slowly by the years. Some people believe that Bana attained prosperity by worshipping Lord Shiva in this temple.
