= Kolia Bhomora Setu =

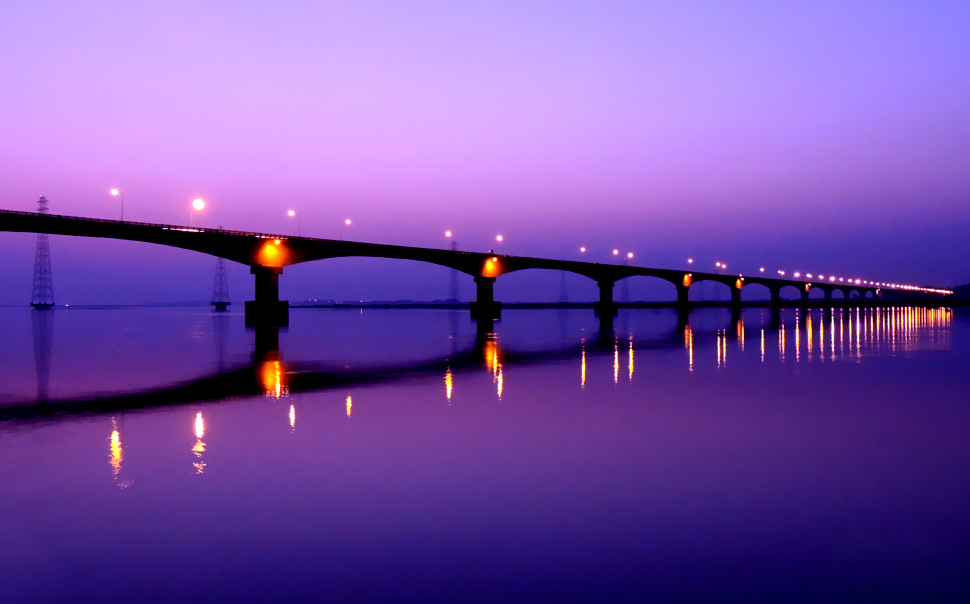
- View of the bridge just after sunset
- Coordinates: 26°35′55″N 92°51′30″E
- Locale: Between Tezpur, Assam, India and Kaliabor, Assam, India
- Official name: Kolia Bhomora Setu
- Maintained by: Government of Assam

Characteristics
- Material: Pre-stressed concrete
- Total length: 3,015 metres (9,892 ft)
- Longest span: 120 metres (390 ft)
- No. of spans: 24

History
- Construction start: 1981
- Construction end: 1987
- Opened: 1987

Location
- Interactive map of Kolia Bhomora Setu

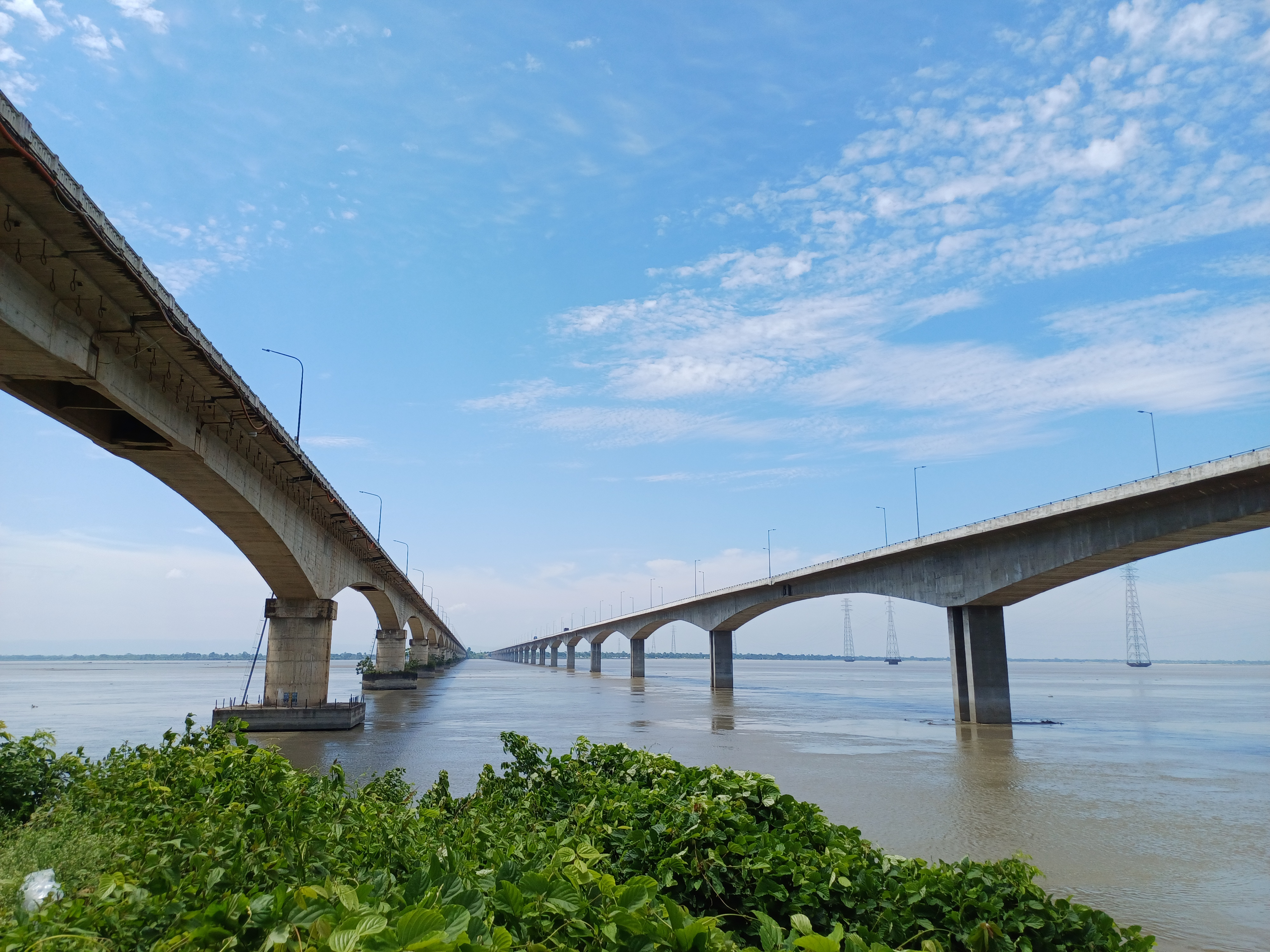
Kolia Bhomora Setu With the newly constructed second Bridge

Kolia Bhomora Setu is a 3.015 km long pre-stressed concrete road bridge on NH-715 over the Brahmaputra River in Tezpur Assam state of India. Completed in 1987, the bridge connects Tezpur in Sonitpur district on the northern bank with Kaliabor in Nagaon District on the south bank. It is named after the Ahom general Kolia Bhomora Phukan. A new Bhomoraguri-Tezpur Bridge 3.040 km long, few meters parallel to the existing Kolia Bhomora Setu, is opened in 2022.

== History ==
This bridge is named after Ahom General Kalia Bhomora Borphukan, who planned to construct a bridge over Brahmaputra river in the reign of Kamaleswar Singha, while this was going at progress, his sudden death caused its abandonment.

In 1987, it was inaugurated by the then PM of India, Rajiv Gandhi, after completing its construction from 1981 to 1987. On 14 April 1987, India Post issued an INR2 commemorative stamp of this. In 1988, American Concrete Institute awarded Hindustan Construction Company the Certificate of Merit for the Most Outstanding Concrete Structure.

In 2016, the collection of toll was stopped due to complaints that the bridge construction cost was Rs. 80 crore which was below tollable ceiling of Rs. 100 crores.

== Accidents & Incidents ==
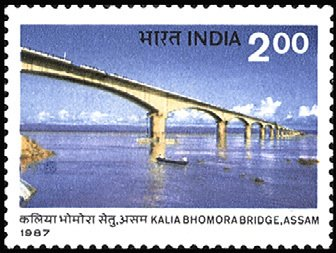
Stamp of India 1987 Inauguration of Kalia Bhomora Bridge Assam

- On 23 January 2021, an 18-wheeler truck lost its controlled and crashed into the bridge's railing leaving the front of the truck hanging out of the bridge. However, no fatalities or injuries have been reported.
- In 2020, an oil tanker reportedly fell of the bridge. There were 3 people on board when the incident took place, but only one survived the crash. The tanker was empty preventing the risk of fire. It was headed to Lumding.
- On 7 March 2020, a fully loaded truck lost its control and fell off the bridge. The truck landed on the bank of the Brahmaputra River. The driver was seriously injured and was rushed to a nearby hospital.
- On 21 June 2019, a truck with a trailer loaded with cars fell off the bridge. The truck was arriving from Punjab. The truck driver succumbed to his injuries.
- On 8 November 2018, a passenger vehicle carrying 16 people crashed into a truck. Three people died on the spot while thirteen were injured.

== See also ==
- List of bridges on Brahmaputra River
- List of longest bridges in the world
- List of longest bridges above water in India

== Gallery ==
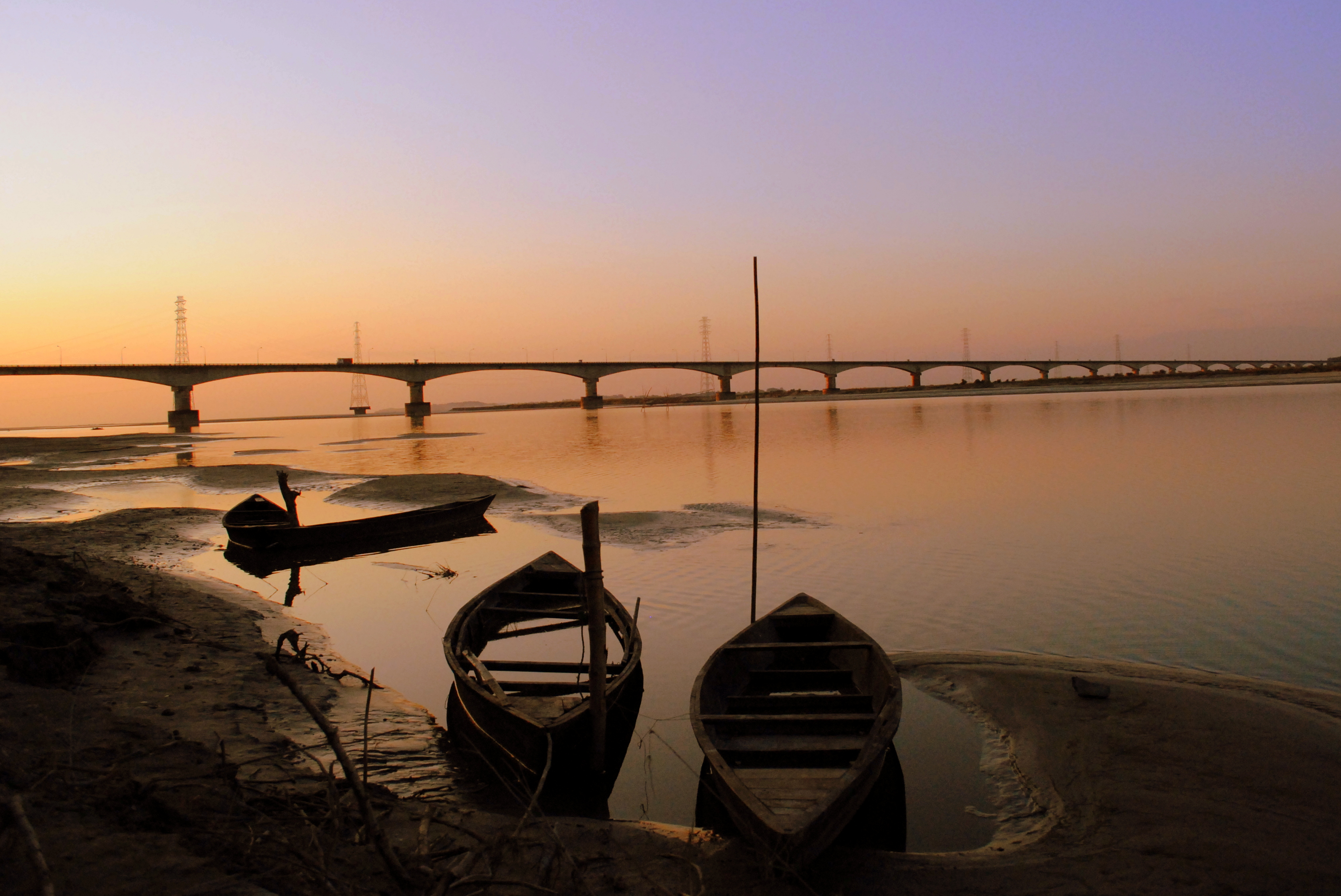
Kolia Bhomora Setu

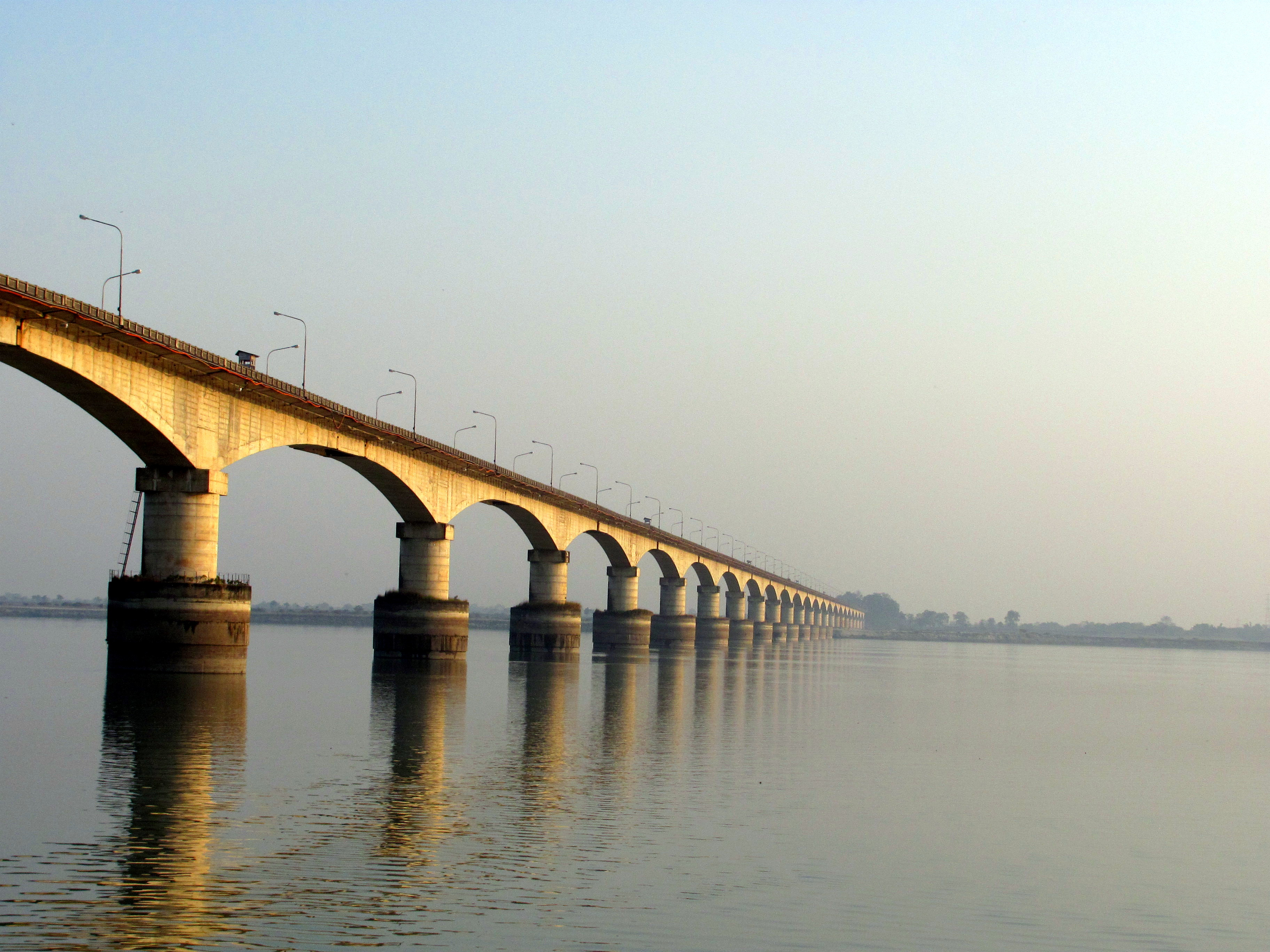

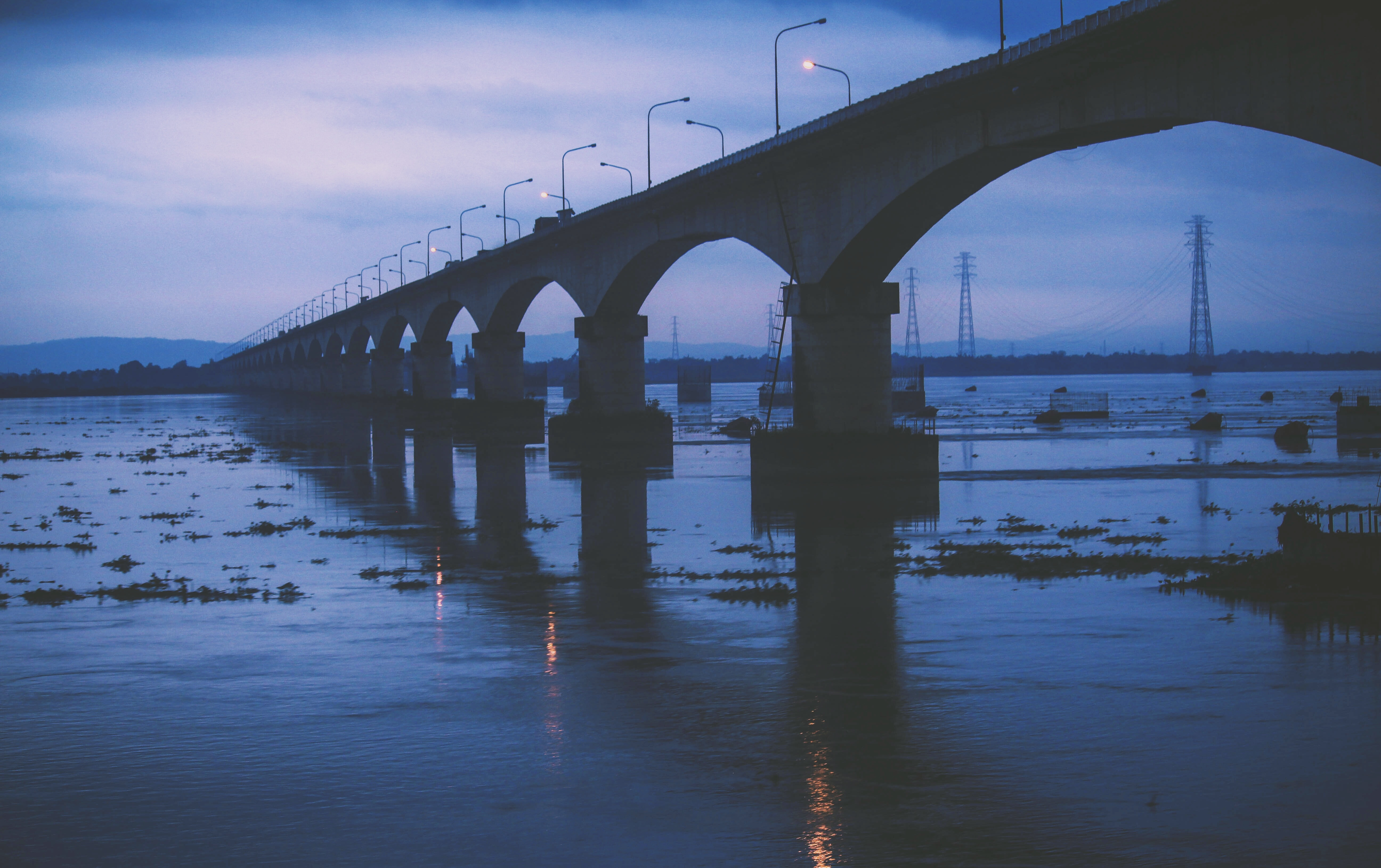

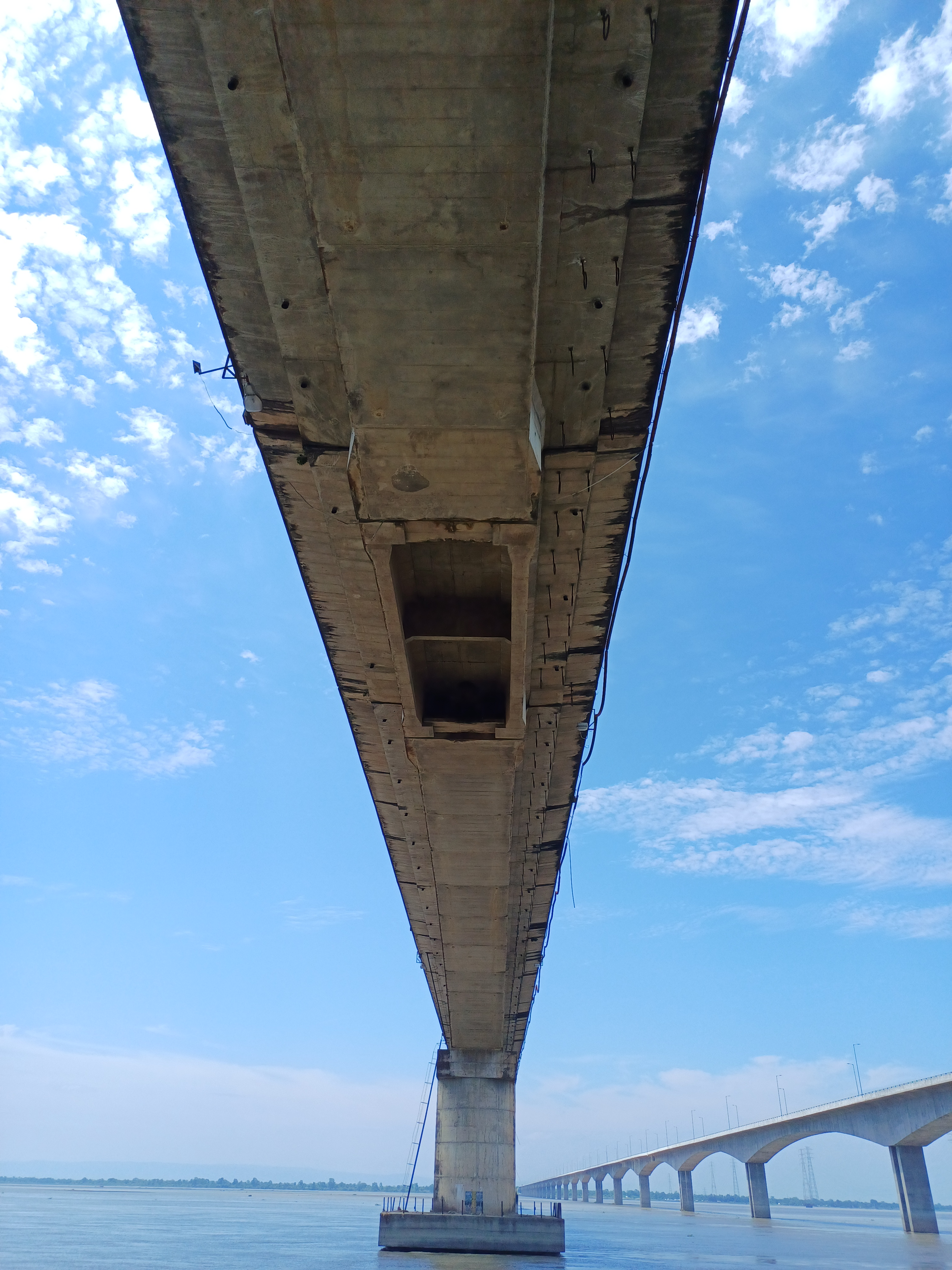
Bottom view of the bridge
