= Tezpur =

- City
- Tezpur City
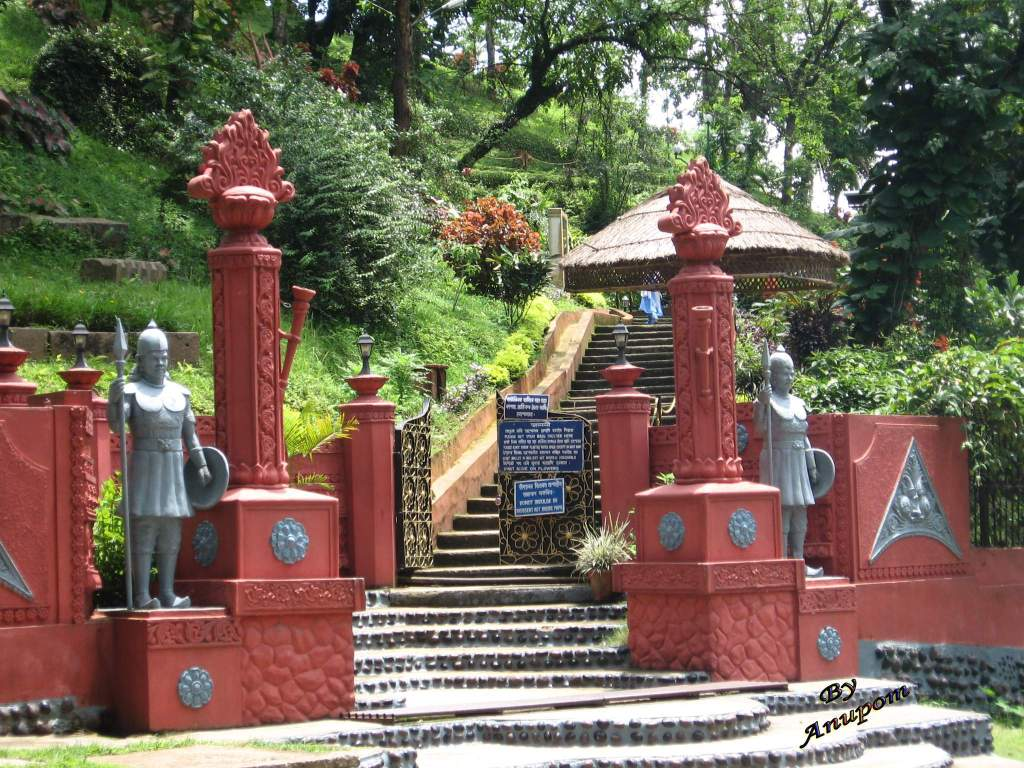
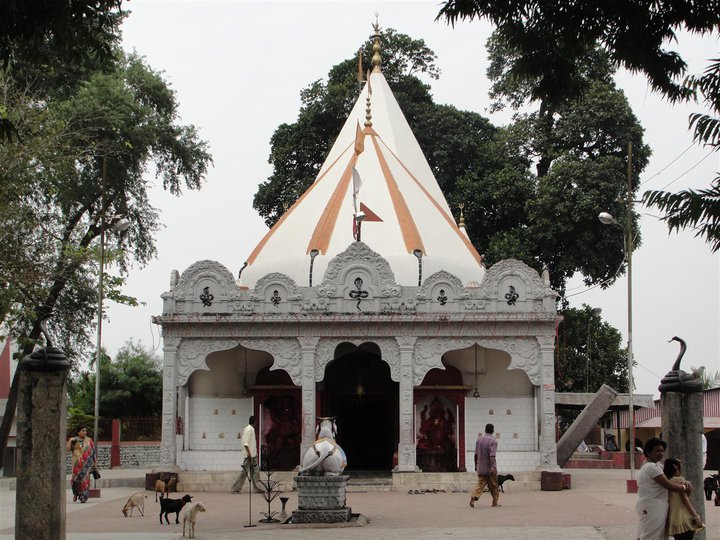
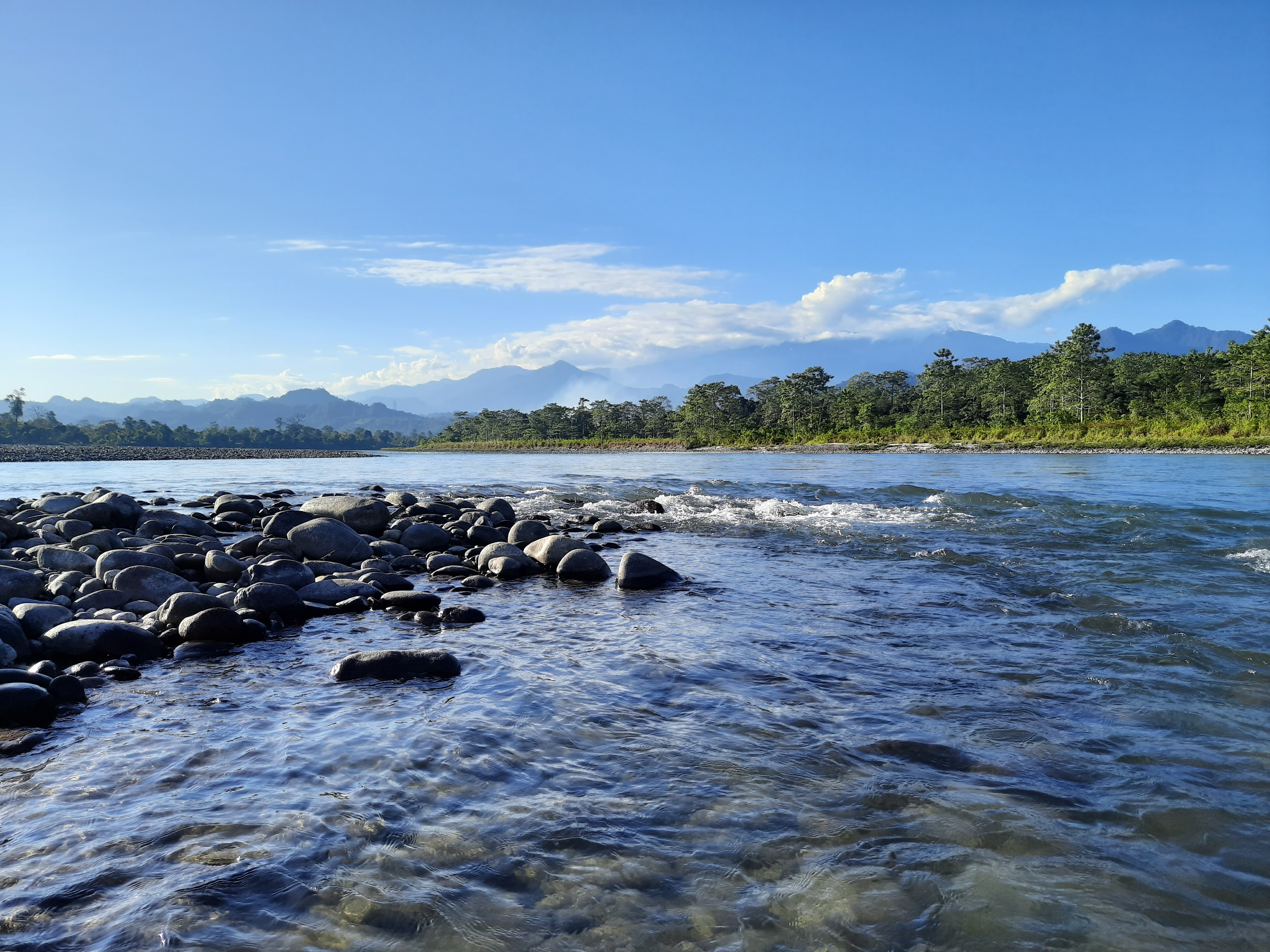
- Agnigarh Hill (top), Mahabhairav Temple and Harihara War Sculpture (middle), Nameri National Park (bottom)

- Location in Assam, India Tezpur (India)
- Coordinates: 26°37′42″N 92°47′59″E
- Country: India
- State: Assam
- District: Sonitpur

Government
  - Type: Municipality
  - Body: Tezpur Municipality Board

Area
  - Total: 40 km^{2} (15 sq mi)
- Elevation: 80–142 m (262–466 ft)

Population (2011)
  - Total: 102,505
  - Rank: 6th
  - Density: 2,600/km^{2} (6,600/sq mi)

Languages
  - Official: Assamese
- Time zone: UTC+5:30 (IST)
- Postal code: 784001
- ISO 3166 code: IN-AS
- Vehicle registration: AS-12
- Website: sonitpur.assam.gov.in

Tezpur (Assamese: [tɛz.pʊɹ]) is a city in Sonitpur district, Assam state, India. Tezpur is located on the banks of the river Brahmaputra, 175 kilometres (109 mi) northeast of Guwahati, and is the largest of the north bank cities.

== History ==
Tezpur was under the rule of the Koch dynasty and later became a part of the Ahom kingdom in the 16th century. The Ahoms, known for their administrative prowess and patronage of art and culture, played a vital role in shaping Tezpur's heritage. The city witnessed several battles and conflicts during the medieval period.

Modern Tezpur is a medieval trading town and cultural and educational hub, home to several archaeological sites, temples, and monuments.

== Climate ==
The average high temperature in summer is around 31 °C (88 °F) while the average winter low temperature is around 13 °C (55 °F).

Climate data for Tezpur (1991–2020, extremes 1901–present)
Month	Jan	Feb	Mar	Apr	May	Jun	Jul	Aug	Sep	Oct	Nov	Dec	Year
Record high °C (°F)	29.5 (85.1)	33.2 (91.8)	38.2 (100.8)	38.7 (101.7)	39.5 (103.1)	39.4 (102.9)	39.5 (103.1)	39.5 (103.1)	38.9 (102.0)	37.9 (100.2)	34.3 (93.7)	33.9 (93.0)	39.5 (103.1)
Mean daily maximum °C (°F)	23.7 (74.7)	25.3 (77.5)	29.3 (84.7)	29.7 (85.5)	30.7 (87.3)	31.6 (88.9)	31.9 (89.4)	32.3 (90.1)	32.0 (89.6)	31.0 (87.8)	28.3 (82.9)	25.0 (77.0)	29.3 (84.7)
Daily mean °C (°F)	17.3 (63.1)	20.0 (68.0)	23.3 (73.9)	25.0 (77.0)	26.7 (80.1)	28.3 (82.9)	28.6 (83.5)	29.0 (84.2)	28.3 (82.9)	26.2 (79.2)	22.4 (72.3)	18.7 (65.7)	24.5 (76.1)
Mean daily minimum °C (°F)	11.3 (52.3)	13.9 (57.0)	17.2 (63.0)	20.0 (68.0)	22.4 (72.3)	24.7 (76.5)	25.3 (77.5)	25.5 (77.9)	24.7 (76.5)	21.8 (71.2)	16.8 (62.2)	12.7 (54.9)	19.7 (67.5)
Record low °C (°F)	5.6 (42.1)	6.1 (43.0)	10.0 (50.0)	12.2 (54.0)	14.4 (57.9)	17.6 (63.7)	21.2 (70.2)	20.3 (68.5)	19.9 (67.8)	13.7 (56.7)	10.6 (51.1)	6.1 (43.0)	5.6 (42.1)
Average rainfall mm (inches)	12.0 (0.47)	22.3 (0.88)	49.7 (1.96)	167.2 (6.58)	268.2 (10.56)	315.5 (12.42)	289.3 (11.39)	281.8 (11.09)	210.2 (8.28)	104.2 (4.10)	21.7 (0.85)	7.1 (0.28)	1,749 (68.86)
Average rainy days	1.1	2.0	4.2	11.4	14.3	15.3	15.4	13.3	11.8	5.3	1.4	0.6	96.1
Average relative humidity (%) (at 17:30 IST)	73	64	58	68	74	79	80	80	82	81	78	77	74
Source 1: India Meteorological Department
Source 2: Tokyo Climate Center (mean temperatures 1991–2020)

== Demography ==
Languages spoken in Tezpur city (2011)
1. Assamese (39.8%)
2. Bengali (18.2%)
3. Hindi (10.8%)
4. Others (31.1%)

At the 2011 census, the population of the Tezpur city Municipal Corporation area was 102,505. Of these, 40,837 people spoke Assamese, 18,696 spoke Bengali, 11,050 spoke Hindi, and 31,920 spoke other languages.

== Education ==
=== Universities ===
- Tezpur University

=== Colleges ===
- Baptist Christian Hospital Tezpur
- Darrang College
- Girijananda Chowdhury Institute of Management and Technology, Tezpur
- Tezpur Law College
- Tezpur Medical College and Hospital

== Tourism ==
Tezpur has several tourist attractions:

- Bhairabi Temple: The Bhairabi Temple is located on the outskirts of Tezpur. The Goddess Bhairavi is worshipped here as she is one of the Mahavidyas of Maa Durga Devi. It is a very important Shakta pitha of Assam. The backdrop of the temple is a view looking towards the Kolia Bhomora Setu across the Brahmaputra River. The temple site is also locally known Bhairabi Devalaya. Legend has it that Usha (daughter of mighty Asura King Banasura) regularly came here for the worshipping of the Goddess.
- Mahabhairav Temple: An ancient Mahabhairav Temple is located north of the city of Tezpur. According to legend, it was established by King Bana and originally contained a Siva lingam. The temple was originally constructed of stone, but the current structure is made of concrete. The Ahom kings of the era donated land and appointed priests and attendants to maintain the temple.
- Rudrapada Temple: Located on the east side of Tezpur and on the bank of the Brahmaputra river, the Rudrapada Temple is believed to be the site where Rudra (Lord Shiva) left the print of his left foot on a stone. According to legend, Mahadeva revealed his true self to King Bana at this location. The temple was built in 1730 by Siva Singha, but the main temple was later destroyed due to erosion by the Brahmaputra river.
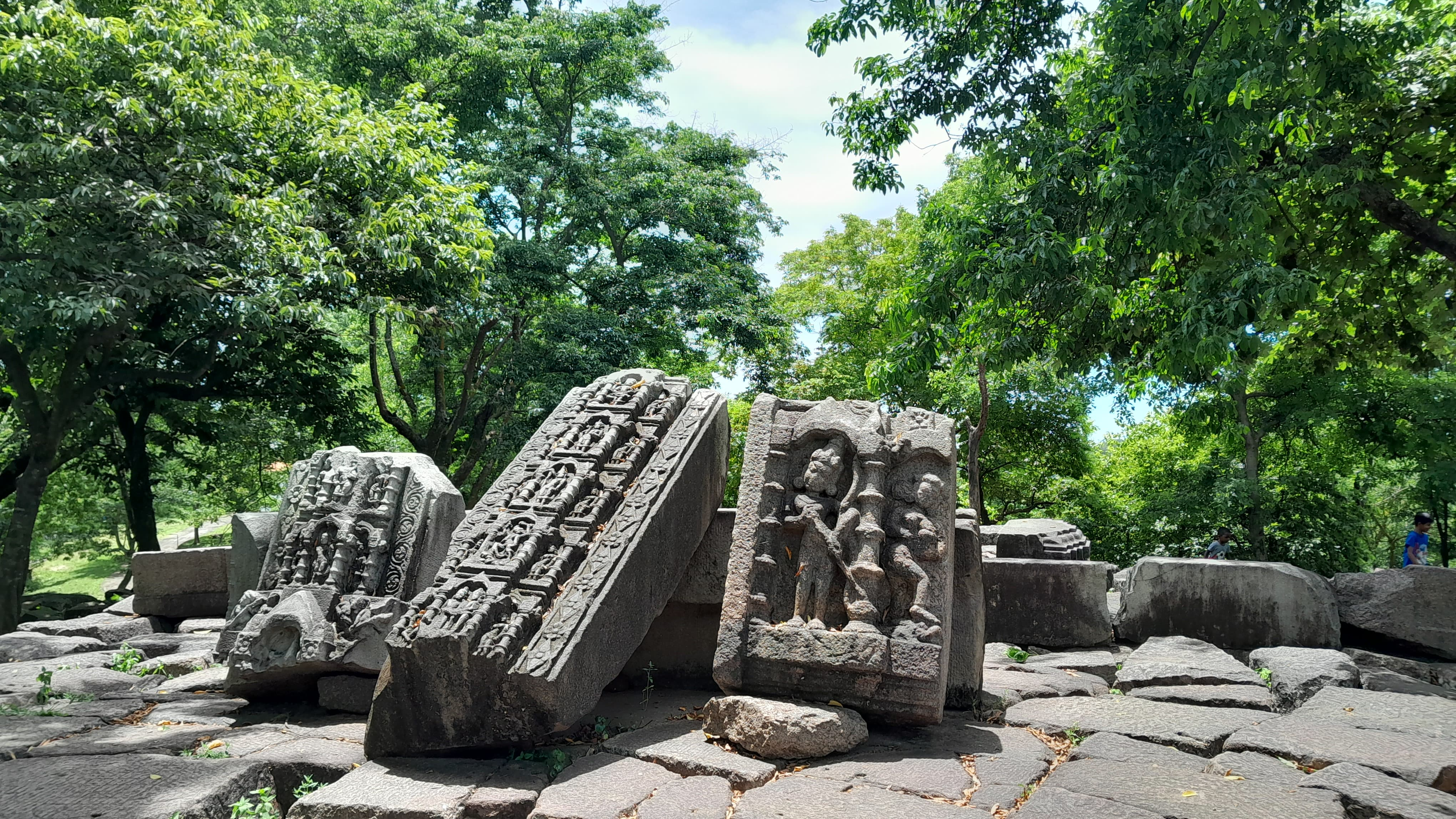
  Archaeological ruins at Bamuni Pahar.
- Bhomoraguri: A stone inscription made by the Ahom General Kalia Bhomora Borphukan, who planned to construct a bridge over Brahmaputra. Almost two centuries later, a bridge at the same site now stands completed. The 3.015 km bridge, named after the great Ahom general, connects Silghat of Nagaon district with Tezpur.
- Da Parbatia is a small village close to west Tezpur, in the Indian State of Assam. In the village there are significant architectural remnants of an ancient temple of the 6th century overlying the ruins of another Shiva temple built of bricks during the Ahom period. Archaeological excavations done here in 1924 have unearthed a sixth-century antiquity in the form of a stone door frame with extensive carvings. The ruins of the temple built during the Ahom period are built over the ancient temple's foundations and are in the form of a stone paved layout plan of the sanctum sanctorum and a mandapa. This complex is under the jurisdiction of the Archaeological Survey of India and its importance and notability is recorded under the Ancient Monuments and Archaeological Sites and Remains Act 1958.
- Trimurty Udyan: Located along Borpukhuri, this park is named after three important figures in Assamese culture: Rupkowar Jyoti Prasad Agarwalla, Kalaguru Bishnu Prasad Rabha, and Natasurjya Phani Sarmah.
- Agnigarh: This hillock located on the bank of the Brahmaputra river is said to be the site of the legendary romance between Princess Usha, the only daughter of King Banasura, and Aniruddha, the grandson of Krishna, a deity in Hinduism. According to legend, Usha was kept on this hillock and was surrounded by fire, hence the name "Agnigarh," which means "hill of fire" in Sanskrit.
- Chitralekha Udyan (Cole Park): Chitralekha Udyan is a park established in 1906 by British Deputy Commissioner Cole. It features two massive ornamented stone pillars and other sculptural remnants, and was renovated in 1996 by Deputy Commissioner M.G.V.K.Bhanu. The park has water sports facilities, walkways, a restaurant, and an open-air stage.
- Harjara Pukhuri: A large artificial lake named after Harjara Varmana of the Mleccha dynasty, excavated in the early 9th century.
- Padum Pukhuri: A lake featuring an island, that has been developed into a park with a musical fountain. The island is accessible via an iron bridge, and visitors can also go boating on the lake.
- Bamuni Hills: The Bamuni Hills contain ruins that feature sculptural remains dating back to the 9th and 10th centuries CE.

== Government ==
Tezpur is part of Tezpur (Lok Sabha constituency). Ranjit Dutta from Bharatiya Janata Party is the current member of parliament for the Tezpur constituency.

== Notable people ==
- Ananda Chandra Agarwala
- Jyoti Prasad Agarwala
- Iqbal Ahmed Ansari, former Chief Justice of Patna High Court.
- George Baker, former M.P. of Lok Sabha
- Padmanath Gohain Baruah
- Hem Barua
- Bijoy Chandra Bhagavati
- Rajesh Borah
- Charles Alexander Bruce
- Somnath Chatterjee, former Speaker of Lok Sabha
- Bipinpal Das, former Union Deputy Foreign Minister of India.
- Chetana Das
- Tapan Deka, IPS and Director of the Intelligence Bureau
- Brindaban Goswami, former Education Minister of Assam
- Nipon Goswami
- Dipak Jain, former Director (Dean) of Sasin Graduate Institute of Business Administration of Chulalongkorn University in Bangkok, Thailand and INSEAD Chaired Professor of Marketing.
- Rishi Kaushik, actor
- Kayadu Lohar, Indian actor and model
- Bishnu Prasad Rabha
- Baneswar Saikia, former MLA
- Phani Sarma

== See also ==
- Jamugurihat
- Ministry for Development of North Eastern Region
- Northeast India
- North Eastern Council
- Tezpur Assembly constituency
- Tezpur Lok Sabha constituency
- Sonitpur Lok Sabha constituency
- Tezpur Municipal Board
