= Akkiraju Umakantham =

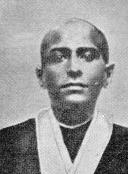
Akkiraju Umakantham

Akkiraju Umakantham (1889–1942) was a scholar of the Telugu, Sanskrit and English languages. He was an influential author of literary criticism in Telugu.

He was the editor of the magazine Trilinga, which was started in 1914 by Vavilikolanu Subbarao. He worked as the president of Telugu branch of Presidency College, Chennai from 1920 to 1936.
