= Suryaraya Andhra Nighantuvu =

Telugu dictionary

Sri Suryaraya Andhra Nighantuvu శ్రీ సూర్యరాయాంధ్ర నిఘంటువు
- Language: Telugu
- Subject: Dictionary
- Publication date: 1936–1974
- Publication place: India
- Media type: 8 volumes

Sri Suryaraya Andhra Nighantuvu is a Telugu language dictionary. It is the most comprehensive monolingual Telugu dictionary. It was published in eight volumes between 1936 and 1974. It was named after Rao Venkata Kumara Mahipati Surya Rau, the zamindar of Pitapuram Estate who sponsored the first four volumes of the dictionary.

The dictionary features over 1.1 lakh words with information about each entry like word origin, meaning, synonyms and historical usage in literature. A team of 40 scholars contributed to the dictionary over a period of six decades from 1911 to 1974. The first four volumes were published by Andhra Sahitya Parishad, Kakinada.

== History ==
Rao Venkata Kumara Mahipati Surya Rau, the Maharajah of Pitapuram was interested in the promotion of Telugu language and literary development. Surya Rau, Mokkapati Subbrayudu, his Dewan and Jayanti Ramaiah Pantulu, a magistrate in the Madras Presidency were crucial in initiating the dictionary. The three of them met at Dunmore House in Madras on 26 March 1911 and arranged a meeting of scholars. The meeting was attended by eminent scholars like Kandukuri Veeresalingam, Vedam Venkataraya Sastry, Chennapragada Bhanumurthy, Goteti Kanakaraju, Vavilikolanu Subba Rao and Komarraju Venkata Lakshmana Rao. Veeresalingam proposed the necessity to have a comprehensive dictionary for Telugu language and Surya Rau, the Maharajah of Pithapuram, came forward to sponsor such a dictionary.

On 12 May 1911, Surya Rau constituted Saraswata Parishad and fixed the objectives of the dictionary to incorporate etymology and other such information. A dictionary compilation committee was constituted with Vedam Venkataraya Sastry as the editor and Jayanti Ramayya (Jayanti Ramaiah) as the executive. Work did not progress much even after two years of formation of the committee. The office of the dictionary compilation was shifted to Pitapuram from Madras and Jayanti Ramayya was made the editor of the dictionary. After that, the compilation work progressed.

The first volume of the dictionary was released in April 1936. Apart from Surya Rau, Sarvepalli Radhakrishnan, Kasinathuni Nageswara Rao, Korada Ramakrishnaiya, Nelaturi Venkata Ramanaiah among others took part in the release function. The second, third, and fourth volumes released in 1939, 1942, and 1944. The expenditure incurred for compiling the first four volumes was estimated to be around ₹20 lakh, a princely sum at the time.

After Indian independence in 1947, the princely states were merged into the Indian Union and the Pitapuram Maharajah suffered heavy loss as a result. Therefore, he could not extend financial support to the compilation work. As a result, the fifth volume of the dictionary was delayed. However, with the support from the composite Madras State the fifth, sixth and seventh volumes were completed. The eighth edition saw light because of the efforts of Diwakarla Venkatavadhani and Patibanda Madhava Sarma.

== Content ==
The dictionary features over 1.1 lakh words with information about each entry like word origin, meaning, synonyms and historical usage in literature. It even incorporated legislative terminology.

== Volumes ==
The compilation of the dictionary began in 1911 and concluded in 1972. During this period, the project faced several hurdles and four editors were changed. The first volume was released in 1936, the second one in 1939, the third one in 1942, and the fourth volume in 1944. The fifth, sixth and seventh volumes were released in 1958, and the last volume was released in 1974.

Publication year	Volume number
1936	I
1939	II
1942	III
1944	IV
1958	V
1958	VI
1958	VII
1974	VIII

== Reception ==
According to scholars, Suryarayandhra dictionary is much better in comparison to other works like Andhra Vachaspatyam, Lakshminarayaneeyam, Sabdhardha Chandrika, Andhrapada Parijatam and Sabda Ratnakaram. However, it also received criticism by scholars. The primary criticism was the lack of space for colloquial language in the dictionary. Noted scholars Gidugu Ramamurthy and Vadlamudi Venkata Ratnam termed it not comprehensive and full of errors. They wrote many articles criticising the dictionary.

== Contributors ==
Jayanti Ramayya edited the first and second volumes between 1936 and 1939. Third and fourth volumes were edited by Kasibhatta Subbayya Sastri between 1942 and 1944. A team of over 40 scholars contributed to the dictionary. Some of them include:

- Tanjanagaram Tevapperumallaiah
- Puranapanda Mallayya Sastry
- Kuchi Narasimham
- Charla Narayana Sastry
- Pisupati Chidambara Sastry
- Vemparala Suryanarayana Sastry
- Darbha Sarveswara Sastry
- Samavedam Sriramamurthy Sastry
- Pannala Venkatadribhatta Sarma
- Chilukuri Veerabhadra Sastry
- Akundi Venkata Sastry
- Prayaga Venkatarama Sastry
