= Aqua omnium florum =

All-flower water

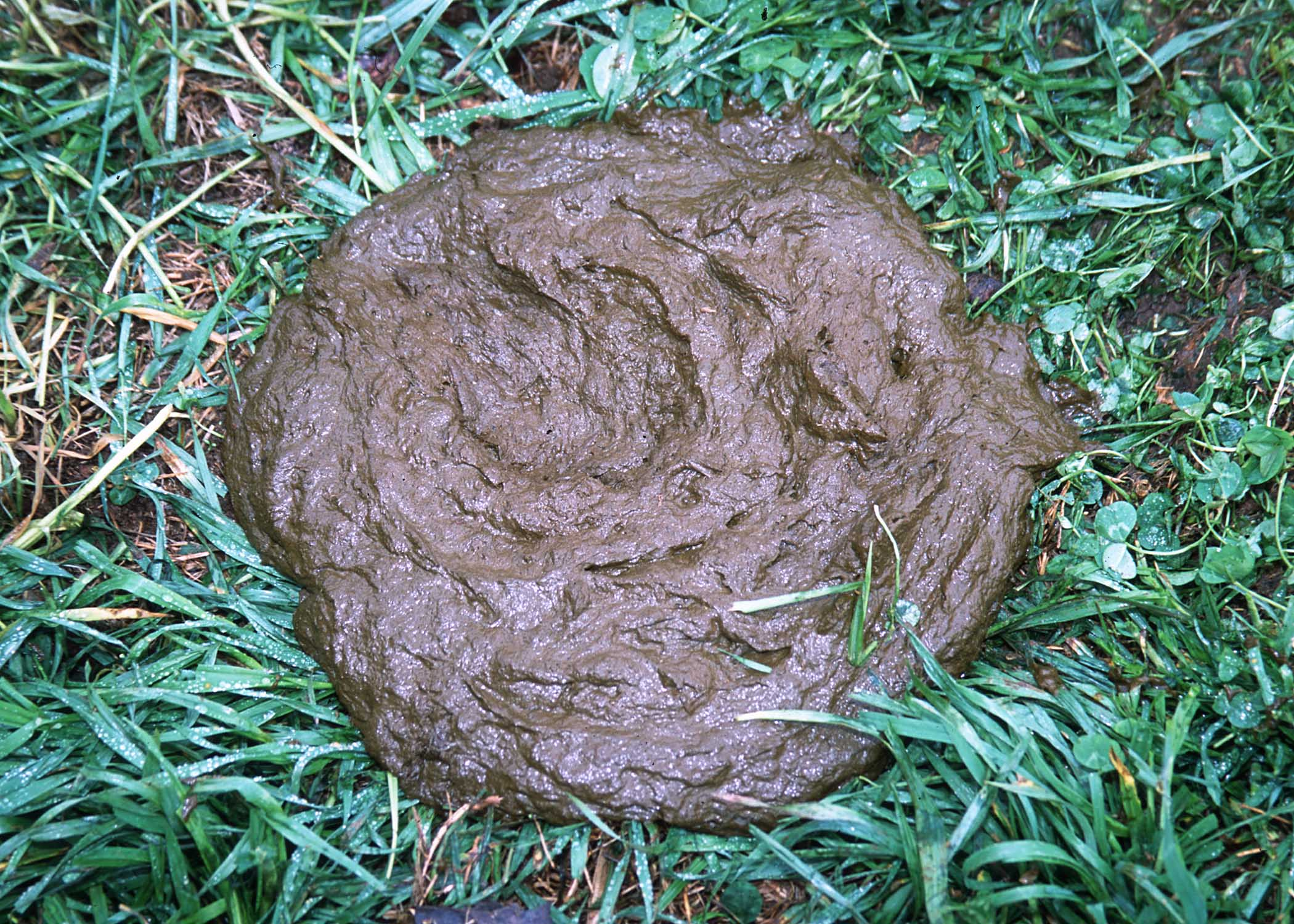
A cow pat.

Aqua omnium florum or all-flower water was water distilled from cow-dung in May, when the cows ate fresh grass with meadow flowers. It was also known less euphemistically as aqua stercoris vaccini stillatitia (distilled water of cow dung). This was used as a medicine to treat a variety of ailments including gout, rheumatism and tuberculosis.

The 17th century court physician George Bate favoured it and it appeared in the Pharmacopœia Bateana — Bate's Dispensatory. Recipes included:

cow dung, gathered in May, adding to it a third of white wine and then distilled

fresh cow-dung and snails with their shells bruised equal parts, mix and distill in a common still

Rx Fresh cow dung gathered in the morning; spring or rain water; mix and digest twenty-four hours, let it settle, and then decant the clear brown tincture.

The latter prescription was used as a panacea by a female doctor in Bate's time. Many incurable cases were brought to her which she treated in this way and she made a great fortune of £20,000 from this practice.

== Urina vaccina ==
Cow tea or urina vaccina (cow's urine) was sometimes called aqua omnium florum too. This was used as a purgative for which the dosage would be "half a pint drank warm from the cow". It was drunk by women in May to clear their complexion.

== Indian traditional medicine ==
Cow dung, urine and other bovine products are still used extensively in the traditional Hindu medicine, Ayurveda.

== Cattle urine drinking in Islam ==
Similarly, in Islam the drinking of camel urine as the Islamic Prophetic medicine by Muhammad, has no medicinal scientific evidence according to the World Health Organization.

== See also ==
- Compost tea
- Beef tea
- Mycobacterium vaccae
- Stool transplant
