= Madhunapantula Satyanarayana Sastry =

- Born: 5 March 1920; Andhra Pradesh
- Died: 7 November 1992 (aged 72)
- Occupation: Poet
- Writing career
- Period: 1920–1992

Madhunapantula Satyanarayana Sastry (b: 5 March 1920 - d: 7 November 1992) is one of the most eminent personalities in pure Telugu literature of recent times. He lived in Rajahmundry in East Godavari District of Andhra Pradesh of South India. His magnum opus is Andhra Puranam. He was awarded the Andhra Pradesh Sahitya Akademi Award for this work.

== Brief life sketch ==
Madhunapantula was born in 1920 at Island Polavaram in Amalapuram taluq to scholarly Brahmin family of Satyanarayana Murthy. Oleti Venkata Rama Sastry was his guru. He studied in Sanskrit school at Injaram and Vizianagaram. After studying Sanskrit and Telugu dramas, epics and grammar, he passed Vidvan examination of Madras University in 1940.

In 1939, he founded a literary organization called 'Andhra Kutiram' at Pallipalem. He started monthly literary magazine Andhri at the age of 19 years and maintained it more than a decade with high standards. There used to be comprehensive editorial comments about the published articles which was appreciated by Vikramadev Varma and C. R.Reddy. His first literary work was Thoranamu in 1938.

He worked on the ambitious lexicon project of Suryaraya Andhra Nighantuvu of Surya Rau Bahadur of Pithapuram between 1940 and 1944. He wrote Parivabhyudaya Kavyam, Ratna Panchalika, Shaddarsana Sangrahamu, Surya Saptati and published them with the financial assistance from the Maharajah.

He worked as Senior Telugu pandit from 1946 in Rajahmundry in Viresalingam Theistic High School and worked for three decades till his retirement in 1977. He wrote biographical details of about 100 Telugu writers named Andhra Rachayitalu in 1950. His magnum opus was Andhra Puranamu in 1954 which was recognized by great writers of that era like Viswanatha, Malladi etc. It procured him Andhra Pradesh Sahitya Akademi Award in 1966. Some of his works are translated to Hindi. During the World Telugu Conference in 1975, A.P.Sahitya Akademi published his Telugulo Ramayanalu

He died on 7 November 1992 at Rajahmundry.

== Literary works ==
- Toranam (1938)
- Saddarsana Sangraham (1942): six darsanas in condensed form.
- Ratna Panchalika (1943)
- Surya Saptati (1943): seventy poems in praise of Sun.
- Dhanvantari Charitra (1945): The history of Dhanvantari.
- Ratnavali (1947)
- Andhra Racayitalu (1950): biographical sketches of reputed poets of first of half of 20th century.
- Bodhi Vrkshamu (1951): glorifies the principle of non-violence.
- Andhra Puranamu (1954): acknowledged as one of the modern Panchakavyas.
- Charitra Dhanyulu (1955): the blessed in history.
- Kalyana Tara (1956)
- Swapna Vasavadatta (1956)
- Shri Khandamu (1968): piece of Wealth.
- Telugulo Ramayanalu (1975): book on the analysis of Ramayanas in Telugu.
- Chaitra Radhamu (1976): the chariot of Spring.
- Sadashiva Panchasika (1977): 500 poems in praise of Lord Shiva.
- Kelakuli
- Jeevana Lekhalu Sahiti Rekhalu
- Madhu Jeevanamu
- Madhu Kosamu
- Madhunapantula Sahitya Vyasalu
- Prasanga Tarangini (1987): Collection of his radio talks.

andhra rachayitalu third publication 2013 sragdhara un published work

== Awards ==
- He was awarded the Sahitya Akademi Award by the Government of Andhra Pradesh for his classical work Andhra Puranamu in 1968.
- He was awarded Kalaprapoorna (Ph.D. honoris causa) by Andhra University in 1982.
- He was given the titles of "Andhra Kalhana" and "Sahiti Samrat" in Rajahmundry in 1975.

== See also ==
- Aaraama Dravidulu
