= Madhunapantula =

Madhunapantula (Telugu: మధునాపంతుల) is a Telugu surname. Bearers of the name:

- Madhunapantula Satyanarayana Sastry, one of the eminent personalities in Telugu literature
- Madhunapantula Suryanarayana Murty, an eminent applied mathematician
