= Cow urine =

Liquid by-product of bovine metabolism

Cow urine is a liquid by-product of metabolism in cows. It has a sacred role in Zoroastrianism and Hinduism.

Urophagia, the consumption of urine, was used in several ancient cultures for various health, healing, and cosmetic purposes; urine drinking is still practiced today. Cow urine is used as medicine in some places of India, Myanmar, and Nigeria. Proponents' claims about its curing diseases and cancer have no scientific backing.

== Hinduism ==
Cow urine is considered sacred in Hinduism. Cow urine is used in the making of pancha-gavya, for use in Hindu rituals. The Mahabharata narrates a story about how Lakshmi, the goddess of prosperity, came to reside in cow dung. In the legend, Lakshmi asks cows to let her live in their bodies because they are pure and sinless. The cows refuse, describing her as unstable and fickle. Lakshmi begs them to accept her request, saying that others would ridicule her for being rejected by the cows, and agreeing to live in the most despised part of their body. The cows then allow her to live in their dung and urine.

== Usage ==
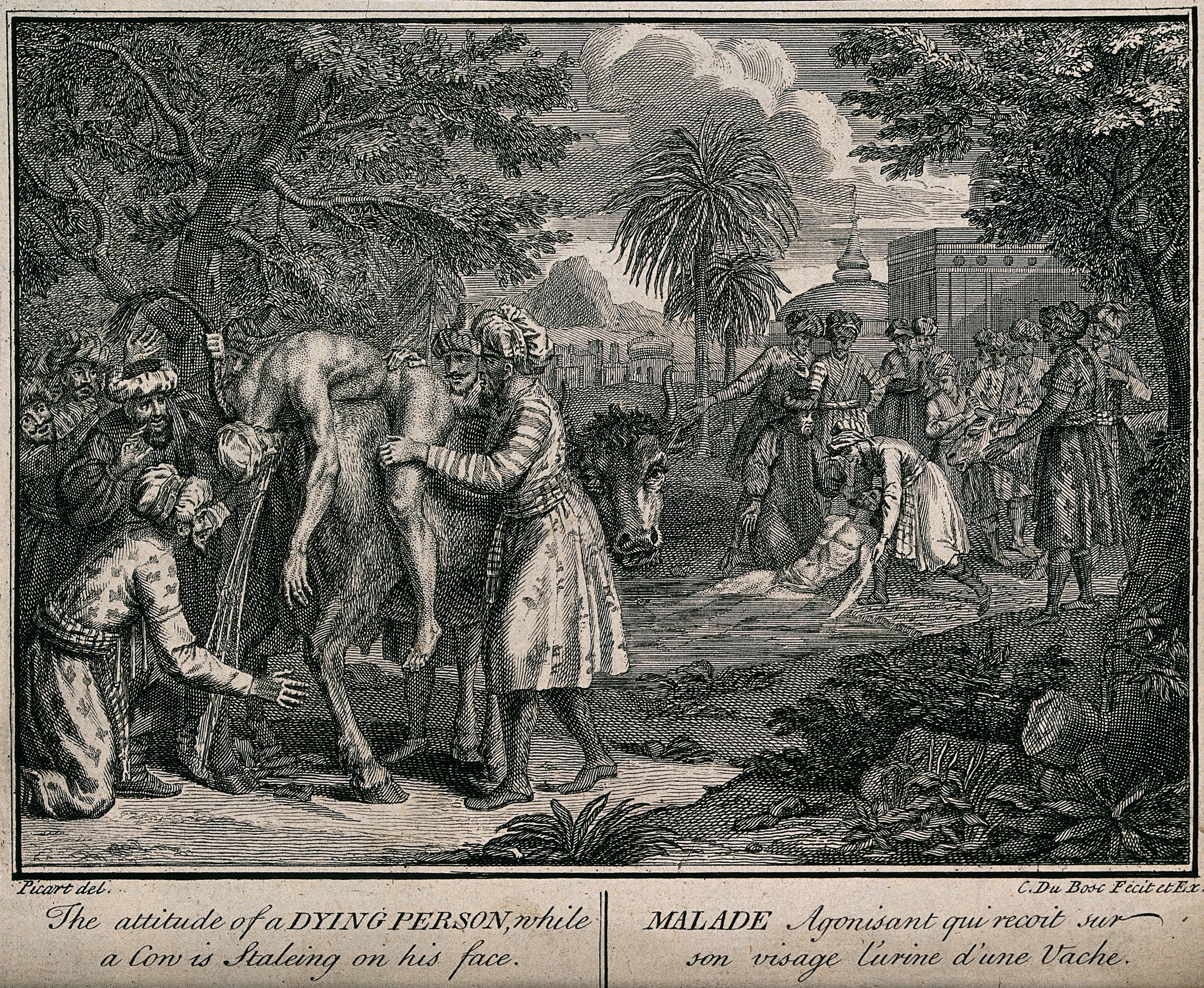
Cow's urine historically used as a treatment in Indian Ayurvedic medicine. A sick man is held over a cow's hindquarters so that the cow's urine streams onto his face.

=== Folk medicine ===
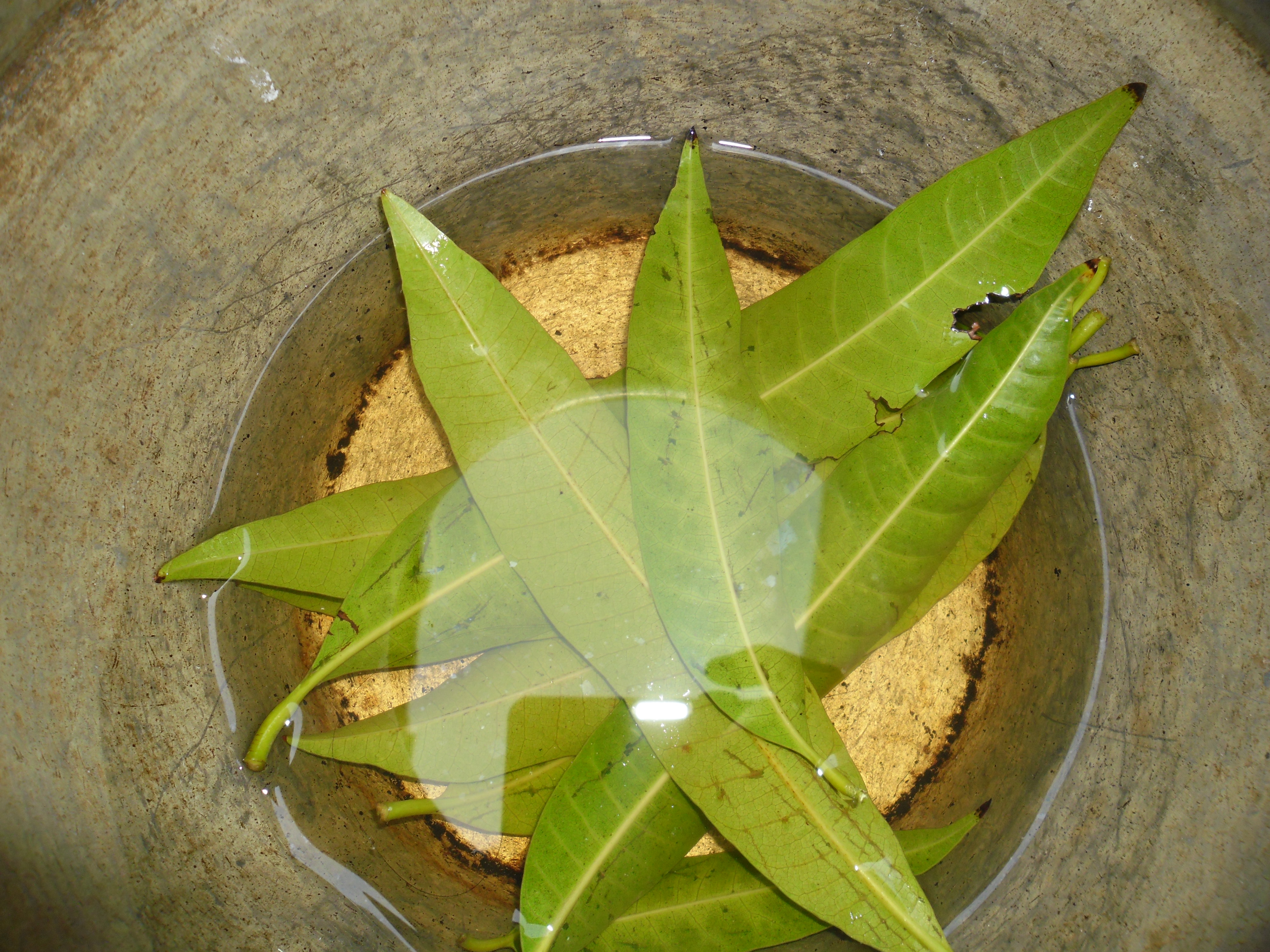
Cow urine

Consuming cow urine is used as folk medicine in some cultures. The purported medicinal benefits of cow urine lack scientific substantiation and rigorous empirical evidence. Claims suggesting that cow urine can cure various ailments or possess unique therapeutic properties are not supported by robust clinical trials or research.

Some Hindus claim that cow urine has a special significance as a medicinal drink. Among other usage, urine therapy is used for the medicinal purposes as a system of alternative medicine popularized by British naturopath John W. Armstrong in the early 20th century based on the metaphorical misreading of the Hebrew Biblical Proverb 5:15. His widely sold book inspired the writing of Manav mootra (Gujarati: Urine therapy; 1959) by Gandhian social reformer Raojibhai Manibhai Patel, and many later works, which often reference Shivambu Kalpa, a treatise on the pharmaceutical value of urine. However, according to medical anthropologist Joseph Alter, the practices of sivambu (drinking one's own urine) and amaroli recommended by modern Indian practitioners of urine therapy are closer to the ones propounded by Armstrong than traditional ayurveda or yoga, or even the practices described in Shivambu Kalpa.

Cow urine is also used in Myanmar and Nigeria as a folk medicine. In Nigeria, a concoction of leaves of tobacco, garlic and lemon basil juice, rock salt and cow urine is used in an attempt to treat convulsions in children. This has resulted in the death of several children from respiratory depression.

==== COVID-19 ====
Cow urine and dung is believed by some in India to protect against COVID-19. There is however no scientific evidence that cow dung or urine improves immunity against COVID‐19, but consuming these products does increase the risk of animal-to-human disease transmission, such as E. coli and Mycobacterium paratuberculosis. Exposure also increases the risk of fungal infections such as mucormycosis in those with COVID-19.

On 14 March 2020, a Akhil Bharat Hindu Mahasabha hosted a cow urine drinking party with over 200 people in attendance to ward off COVID-19. This urine drinking party was held weeks after a leader from Assam, India told state lawmakers during an assembly that "cow urine and cow dung can be used to treat the coronavirus". Leaders from BJP had previously called for the use of cow urine as medicine and a cure for cancer.

In May 2021, two men in Manipur, India, Erendro Leichombam and Kishorechandra Wangkhem, were jailed for stating that cow dung and cow urine were not cures for COVID-19. They had criticized the BJP on Facebook for recommending cow dung and cow urine and were arrested under India's National Security Act. They were jailed for 45 days. In July 2021, the Supreme Court of India ordered that Leichombam be released, saying that the "continued detention of the petitioner would be a violation of the right to life and personal liberty under Article 21 of the Constitution." The Manipur High Court also ordered the release of Wangkhem after two months in jail, citing parity with the Supreme Court decision in Leichombam's case.

=== As a floor cleaner ===
A floor-cleaning fluid called Gaunyle is marketed by an organisation called Holy Cow Foundation. Maneka Gandhi, Women and Child Development Minister, has proposed that Gaunyle be used instead of Phenyl in government offices. In May 2015, Rajendra Singh Rathore, Medical and Health Minister of Rajasthan, inaugurated a ₹40 million (US$420,000) cow urine refinery in Jalore.

=== In farming ===
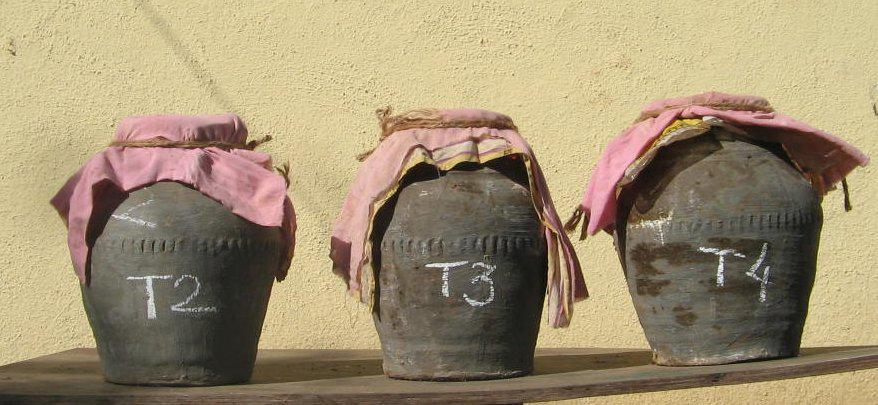
Jeevamrutha storage cans

Cow urine has been used as a fertilizer, such as jeevamrutha that adds cow dung, jaggery, pulse flour and rhizosphere soil to the mixture.

== See also ==
- Cattle in religion and mythology
  - Camel urine
  - Insect tea, from the droppings of insects used in Southeast Asia as the scientifically-unproven traditional medicine
  - Kopi luwak (civet coffee), expensive coffee from the partially digested coffee cherries from the dung of civet animal
  - Panchagavya, Sanskrit word for the five cow-derivatives
  - Prophetic medicine, drinking of camel urine by Mohammad as medicine
- Alternative medicine
  - Alternative cancer treatments
  - Aqua omnium florum, use of water distilled from cow-dung as medicine in the Western World
  - Cow-hugging therapy
- Stool transplant, from one person to other as therapy in modern medicine
