= Rao Venkata Kumara Mahipati Surya Rau =

Maharajah of Pithapuram

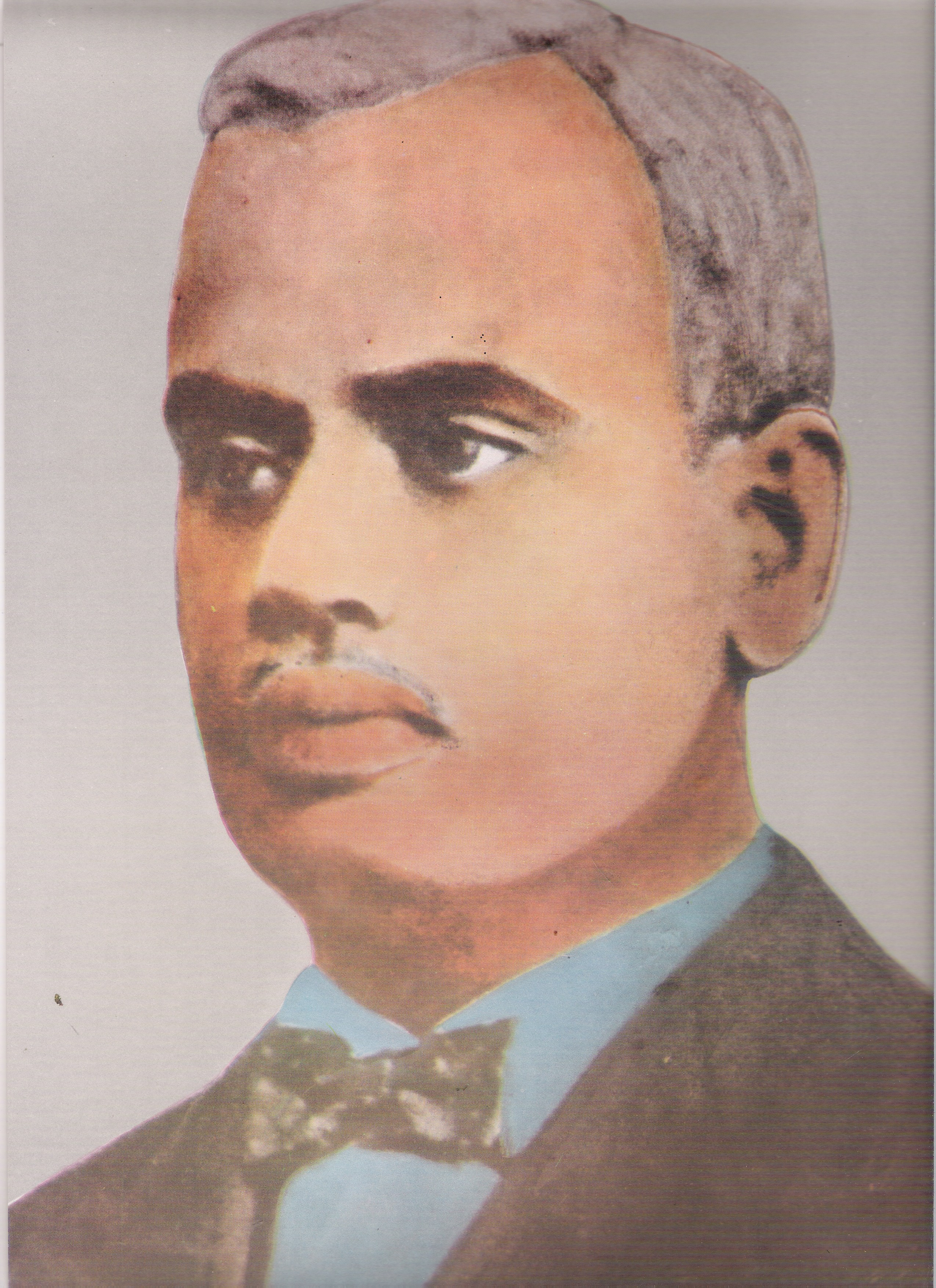
Portrait of Rao Venkata Kumara Maheepati SuryaRao

Rao Venkata Kumara Mahipati Surya Rau CBE (1885–1964) was Maharajah of Pithapuram. He was called by Telugu people "Abhinava Krishnadevaraya". Maharani Sita Devi of Baroda was his daughter.

== Early life ==
Surya Rau was born to Raja Gangadhara Rao and Maharani Mangamamba Devi on 5 October 1885 in the Pithapuram Fort and was named 'Suryaraya'. Gangadhar Rao married seven wives, but did not bear any children for sometime. Before his birth, Maharajah adopted a boy from the Venkatagiri royal family. This late birth and adoption led to endless litigation between 1891 and 1899. Finally the Privy Council decided in favour of the new-born prince. According to the will written by his father, Gollaprolu Estate was given to the adopted son.

His childhood was passed by the sad experience of the death of his father at the age of 5 years and mother at the age of 9 years. However he was looked after by his stepmother Chittada Rani.

He was placed under the care of the Court of Wards and admitted in Newington College, Madras. The Principal Morrison allowed the young prince to come under the influence of Indian Culture through study of Sanskrit and Telugu languages. His tutor, who became later his mentor, was Mokkapati Subbarayudu, a great scholar and a noble soul. Mokkapati was equally proficient in English and Telugu and devoted to the ideal of 'plain living and high thinking'. Mokkapati was to be Maharajah what Aristotle was to Alexander - teacher, friend, philosopher and counsellor.

His teacher introduced his own teacher Raghupathi Venkataratnam, who in due course his spiritual master and inspirer of noble deeds. He also came in contact with another great soul Kandukuri Veeresalingam.

He married Chinnamamba Devi in 1905. She was the eldest daughter of Raja Meka Venkata Rangayya Apparao Bahadur, Zamindar of Kapileswarapuram

== Contribution to Telugu Language ==
The zamindar of Pithapuram sponsored the monumental classical Telugu dictionary, Suryarayandhranighantuvu, and even commissioned the first typewriter in Telugu.

== Publications ==
Surya Rau garu from the early age devoted his time and energy to the development of literature, patronage of authors and many other philanthropic activities. The following is list of books dedicated to him:

- Adipudi Somanatha Kavi - Vijayendra Vijayamu
- Allamraju Subrahmanyam - Subhadra Parinayamu
- Chavali Rama Sudhi - Sahitya Chintamani
- Chintalapudi Ellana - Vishnumaya Natakam
- Dasari Lakshmana Swami - Amruta Kalasamu, Bhaktajana Manoranjanamu, Varnanaratnakaramu
- Devaguptapu Bharadwajam - Sri Suryarat Satakamu
- Devulapalli Subbaraya Sastri - Mahendra Vijayamu
- Devulapalli Venkata Krishna Sastri - Krishna Paksham, Nayanollasamu, Yatiraja Vijayamu
- K. Rajamannar - Sri Suryarat Prabhu Darsanamu
- Kandala Sathagopacharyulu - Peethapuri Vijayamu
- Kasibhatla Subbaraya Sastri - Sri Ramottareti Vruttamu
- Kilambi Gopala Krishnamacharyulu - Pithapura Maharaja Charitam
- Kotikalapudi Sitamma - Geetasaram, Viresalinga Charitra
- Kurumella Venkata Rao - Ma Maharajuto Doora Teeralu
- Madhunapantula Satyanarayana Sastri - Parivabhyudaya Kavyam, Ratna Panchalika,

Shad darsana Sangrahamu, Surya Saptati

- Malladi Suryanarayana Sastri - Kalapoornodayam, Uttara Hari Vamsam
- Nadakuduti Viirraju - Vibhrama Tarangini
- Padala Rama Reddi - Andhra Pradesh Vidya Vishayaka Saasanamulu
- Pasupuleti Venkanna - Seeta Vijayamu
- Puranapanda Mallaya Sastri - Andhrasutra Bhashyam, Sukraneeti Saaramu
- Ramakrishna Kavulu - Andhra Katha saritsaagaramu, Damayanti Kalyanamu, Madalasa, Suvritti Tilakamu, Viswagunaadarsamu,Vyaasabhyudayamu
- Sarvajna Singa Bhoopala - Ratnapaanchaalika
- Sri Tarakam, M.R.Appa Rao, Venkata Parvatiiswara Kavulu - Brahmarshi Venkata Ratnam Jeevita Sangrahamu-Upadesalu-Kathalu
- Sripada Krishnamurti Sastri - Brahmaanandamu
- T. Achyuta Rao - Vijayanagara Samrajyam - Andhra Vangmaya Charitam, Life of Pingali Surana
- Taallapaka Tiruvengala natha - Paramayogi Vilasamu
- Uppalapu Subbaraja Kavi - Sri Suryaraya Vijayamu
- Varanasi Venkateswara Kavi - Ramachandropakhyanam
- Vavilakolanu Subbaraya Kavi - Valmiki Ramayanam
- Vedam Venkataraya Sastri - Andhra Naishada Vyakhya
- Oleti Bhaskara Rama murti - Srirama Jananamu
- Oleti Parvateesam - Suvarnamala

== Honours ==
- Andhra University awarded him Kala Prapoorna in 1953.
