= Vedam Venkataraya Sastry =

Indian writer (1853–1929)

- Portrait from his drama Bobbili Yuddham
- Born: 21 December 1853; Madras, Madras Presidency, India
- Died: 18 June 1929 (aged 75); Madras
- Education: B.A.
- Alma mater: Madras Christian College
- Occupation: Sanskrit Pandit
- Writing career
- Genres: Playwright, Poet, Critic
- Notable work: Prataparudriyam play
- Notable awards: Mahamahopadhyaya; Kalaprapoorna

Vedam Venkataraya Sastry (21 December 1853 – 18 June 1929) was an Indian poet, critic, dramatist, and scholar known for his contributions to Telugu literature and theatre. He is best known for his original plays, translations of Sanskrit classics, and his role in promoting Telugu theatre. His acclaimed works include Prataparudriya Natakam (1897), a historical drama, and Usha Parinayam (1901), among others. He also edited the Suryarayandhra Nighantuvu in 1916, a notable Telugu dictionary.

== Life ==
Vedam Venkataraya Sastry was born on 21 December 1853 in Madras (now Chennai), to Venkataramana Sastry and Lakshmamma. He graduated with a Bachelor of Arts degree in 1887 and went on to serve as a Sanskrit Pandit at Madras Christian College for 25 years.

Sastry was a prolific writer and dramatist who contributed significantly to Telugu theatre and literature. He wrote original dramas and translated Sanskrit works by Kalidasa and Harsha into Telugu. In 1899, he established the Andhra Bhashabhimani Nataka Samajam, a dramatic association that played a pivotal role in promoting Telugu theatre.

Among his original works, Prataparudriya Natakam (1897) and Usha Parinayam (1901) are notable. Prataparudriya Natakam, a historical drama, earned acclaim for its portrayal of the Kakatiya king Prataparudra and his minister Yugandhara, a character inspired by the cunning of Chanakya. The play also introduced memorable characters such as Vidyanatha, the poet; Chekumuki Sastry, the courtier; and the rustic duo Perigadu and Yelli, who became iconic for their humour in Telugu theatre.

Sastry contributed to Telugu lexicography by serving as the chief editor of Suryarayandhra Nighantuvu in 1916, a significant milestone in the compilation of Telugu dictionaries.

He died on 18 June 1929 in Madras.

== Literary works ==
- Naganandamu (1891)
- Sakuntalamu (1896)
- Prataparudriya Natakam (1897)
- Usha Parinayam (1901)
- Vikramorvasiyam (1901)
- Nannechoduni Kavitvamu
- Pushpabana Vilasa
- Visandhi Vivekamu (1912)
- Bobbili Yuddham (1916)
- Malavikagnimitramu (1919)
- Tikkana Somayaji Vijayamu (1919)
- Uttararama Charitra (1920)
- Andhra Sahitya Darpanamu
- Vyāmōhamu
- Tānāṣā, Akkanna Mādannalu
- Telun̐guvārevaru - Parisodhana vyasamu
- Mayasabha (Duryodhana)
- Vēdamu Vēṅkaṭarāyaśāstrulavāri Jīvitacaritra Saṅgrahamu
- Rasamanjari (1950)

== Honors ==
- 1920 : Mahamahopadhyaya award by Andhra Mahasabha.
- 1922 : Sarvatantra Svatantra, Mahamahopadhyaya and Vidyadanavrata Mahoradhi facilitations by Sankara of Dwaraka Peetham.
- 1927 : Kalaprapoorna by Andhra Viswakala Parishad. He was the first recipient of that honour.
- 1958 : Andhra Pradesh Sahitya Akademi award for his critical analysis on Nanne Choda's prabandha poetry in 1958.
