= Cow-hugging therapy =

Animal Therapy

Cow-hugging therapy or cow cuddling is a form of animal-assisted therapy involving hugging cows for healing. People have claimed that it has mental health benefits. As of late 2023, it was reported to be becoming popular around the world. Cow therapy also includes spending time with cows, especially in farm settings, beyond just cow cuddling. Centers with cow therapy can be included within a broader mental health program.

== Origins ==
Cow-hugging therapy originated in the Netherlands. In Australia, the National Disability Insurance Scheme has plans which include cow therapy.

The history of domesticated animals serving as emotional support is not new. The mental health benefits of pet companions along with other animals is well documented. Cows have their own particular personalities which make them a unique alternative to more conventional companions such as dogs or cats. They are also suited to more rural settings which also supports mental health for people experiencing psychological difficulties.

Cattle have a higher body temperature and slower heart rate than humans, making some people believe they are ideal therapy animals. Two Reasons Cattle Make Excellent Therapy Animals.

== See also ==
- Cattle in religion and mythology
- Cow urine
- Equine-assisted therapy
- Swimming with dolphins
- Therapy dog
