= Usha Parinayam =

1901 play written by Vedam Venkataraya Sastry

Usha Parinayam ఉషా పరిణయము
- Original language: Telugu
- Written by: Vedam Venkataraya Sastry
- Characters: Usha; Anirudha; Banasura; Lord Shiva
- Subject: Marriage of Usha
- Genre: Romance

Premiere
- Date: 1901
- Place: Sonapuri

Usha Parinayam (Telugu: ఉషా పరిణయము; English: Marriage of Usha) is one of the famous Indian dramas. It is also a popular Yakshagana. The play was written in 1901 by Vedam Venkataraya Sastry.

== Plot ==
Banasura, the king of demons undertakes a severe penance to solicit the blessings of Lord Shiva. Lord Shiva appears to Banasura and asks him to reveal his desire. Banasura asks for Shiva, Parvati and their entire family to guard the entrance to his city Sonapuri. Shiva goes to Sonapuri with his entire family including the Pramadhaganas to guard the city. This provides the arrogant Banasura with overconfidence and he wages war against the Devas. The Devas are no match for the mighty Banasura, who is under the protection of Shiva and are defeated in the ensuing battle. He further challenges Shiva, the very power under whose allegiance he defeated the Devas. Angered with Banasura’s arrogance, Shiva curses him that when the flag of his chariot falls without a reason, Sri Krishna will fight him and humble his pride.

Usha, the beautiful daughter of Banasura, prays to Lord Shiva and Parvati who are posted at the entrance to her father’s fort and learns the art of dance from Parvati. One day, Usha falls asleep and in her dreams she experiences an intimate and romantic love play with a handsome young man. She is unable to discern if it was a dream or reality. She is scared and confused by all this. She recollects her experience with the young man of her dreams and unable to bear the ensuing erotic pain, she faints.

Usha’s companions call upon her dearest friend Chitralekha for help. Chitralekha understands the situation through a conversation with Usha and persuades Usha to draw a picture of the young man from her dreams. Chitralekha sees the picture and immediately identifies him as Aniruddha, the grandson of Lord Krishna.

Chitralekha brings a sleeping Aniruddha to Usha’s chambers. Usha is overjoyed to see him. When Aniruddha wakes up and finds himself in a strange place with beautiful Usha. Usha expresses her love and tells him that he had been brought to her chambers by Chitralekha. Anirudhha is initially infuriated, but eventually he understands her love for him and agrees to marry her.

The story of Usha Parinayam ends with the marriage between Aniruddha and Usha.

== Main characters ==
- Usha, daughter of Banasura
- Aniruddha, an Yadav prince and grandson of Sri krishna
- Banasura, demon king
- Sri Krishna, Yadava king of Dwaraka
- Narada
- Chitralekha, dearest sakhi of Usha
- Lord Shiva
- Goddess Parvathi

== Film adaptations ==
It was made into Hindi movie Harihar Bhakti in 1956, starring Trilok Kapoor, Shahu Modak, Durga Khote. it was remade into Gujarati movie Okha Haran in 1990, the story was also included in Balram Shri Krishna movie.

Usha Parinayam was taken as a Telugu film in 1961 by Kadaru Nagabhushanam under Rajarajeswari films.
