= Panchagavya =

Mixture used in Hindu rituals

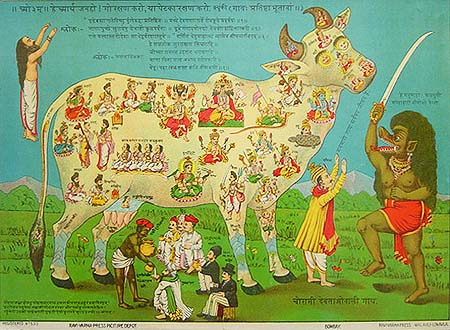
The cow is considered very sacred in Hindu mythology. Inside the cow are drawn images of the major Hindu gods and goddesses. By Raja Ravi Varma in 1897

Panchagavya or panchakavyam is a mixture used in traditional Hindu rituals that is prepared by mixing five ingredients. The three direct constituents are cow dung, cow urine, and milk; the two derived products are curd and ghee. These are mixed and then allowed to ferment. The Sanskrit word panchagavya means "five cow-derivatives". When used in Ayurvedic medicine, it is also called cowpathy.

== Risks ==
Proponents claim that cow urine therapy is capable of curing several diseases, including certain types of cancer, although these claims have no scientific backing. A study concerning ingesting individual components of panchagavya, such as cow urine, showed no positive benefit. Significant side effects in mice, including convulsion, depressed respiration and death, were observed at higher doses.

== Non-medicinal applications ==
Panchgavya is used as a fertilizer and pesticide in agricultural operations. Proponents claim that it is a growth promoter in the poultry diet, that it is capable of increasing the growth of plankton for fish feed, and that it increases the production of milk in cows, increases the weight of pigs, and increases the egg laying capacity of poultry. It is sometimes used as a base in cosmetic products.

== Religious customs ==
It was reported by the Indian Antiquary in June 1895 (pages 168-169) that cow-dung had general use in Brahman purifications and was eaten by Hindus as an atonement for sin:

"Cow-dung and cow-urine, with milk, curds and butter, form the five cow-products, which are worshipped in South India. New earthen pots, are cleansed by pouring into them the five cow products - milk, curds, butter, dung and urine. The five pots are set on darba grass and worshipped. They are called the god Panchgavia, and the worshipper thinks on their merit and good qualities, lays flowers on them, and mentally presents them with a golden throne. Water is sprinkled and waved over them. They are crowned with coloured rice, and are mentally presented with jewels, rich dresses, and sandal wood. Flowers, incense, a burning lamp, plantains, and betel are offered, a low bow is made, and the following prayer repeated:

"Panchgaviâ, forgive our sins and the sins of all beings who sacrifice to you and who drink you. You have come from the body of the cow; therefore I pray you to forgive my sins and to cleanse my body. Cleanse me, who offer you worship, from my sins. Pardon and save me."

After a second bow and the meditation of Hari, the five products are mixed in one cup; the priest drinks a little, pours it into the hollow hands of the worshippers and they drink. Nothing is so cleansing as this mixture. All Indians often drink it. The five nectars - milk, curds, butter, sugar and honey - are good, but much less powerful."

The ancient Mahabharata epic relates that Shri, the Hindu goddess of fortune and prosperity, invisibly resides in the urine and dung of cows.

The Panch Gangotri Temple in Gangotri instituted mandatory Panchagavya consumption for pilgrims from 19 April 2026.

== See also ==
- List of unproven and disproven cancer treatments
- Prasada
- Traditional Knowledge Digital Library
- Urine therapy
