= Mycobacterium vaccae =

Scientific classification
- Domain: Bacteria
- Kingdom: Bacillati
- Phylum: Actinomycetota
- Class: Actinomycetes
- Order: Mycobacteriales
- Family: Mycobacteriaceae
- Genus: Mycobacterium
- Species: M. vaccae

Binomial name
- Mycobacterium vaccae Bönicke and Juhasz 1964 (Approved Lists 1980)

Species of bacterium

Mycobacterium vaccae is a nonpathogenic species of the Mycobacteriaceae family of bacteria that lives naturally in soil. Its name originates from the Latin word, vacca (cow), since the first Mycobacterium strain was cultured from cow dung in Austria. Mycobacterium vaccae was first isolated from the Ugandan Lang'o District, where locals claimed that a "muddy substance had the power to cure a number of ailments". Research areas being pursued with regard to killed Mycobacterium vaccae vaccine include immunotherapy for allergic asthma, cancer, depression, leprosy, psoriasis, dermatitis, eczema and tuberculosis.

A research group at Henry Wellcome Laboratories for Integrative Neuroscience and Endocrinology, University of Bristol, Bristol, England, UK has shown that heat-killed Mycobacterium vaccae injected into mice stimulated a newly discovered group of neurons, increased levels of serotonin and decreased levels of anxiety. Other researchers fed live Mycobacterium vaccae to mice, then measured their ability to navigate a maze compared to control mice not fed the bacteria. "Mice that were fed live M. vaccae navigated the maze twice as fast and with less demonstrated anxiety behaviors as control mice", according to Dorothy Matthews, who conducted the research with Susan Jenks at the Sage Colleges, Troy, New York, USA.

Mycobacterium vaccae is in the same genus as Mycobacterium tuberculosis, the bacterium which causes tuberculosis. Numerous trials have indicated that exposure to oral and injectable products derived from M. vaccae bacteria can have positive effects in treating tuberculosis. Although a 2003 review of selected clinical trials failed to find any consistent benefit of certain dosage regimens of injectable Mycobacterium products in people with tuberculosis, a subsequent meta-analysis of 54 clinical studies of M. vaccae products for tuberculosis showed treatment resulted in improved sputum conversion and radiological (X-ray) assessment.

Medical researchers at Kharkiv National Medical University, Kharkiv, Ukraine have reported two clinical trials with oral formulations of Immunitor Inc's killed Mycobacterium vaccae oral vaccine and An Hui Longcom's killed Mycobacterium vaccae oral vaccine in treating tuberculosis, including drug resistant TB (MDR-TB). The research team reported greater success with the Immunitor vaccine than the An Hui Longcom vaccine. A successful Phase III clinical trial of Tubivac is published.

A team of researchers at the Genetics and Microbiology Department of the Autonomous University of Barcelona, Barcelona, Spain discovered that Mycobacterium vaccae changes from its "smooth" type to its "rough" type (referring to how colonies of this organism appear under a microscope) at thirty degrees Celsius. They discovered that the "smooth" type of Mycobacterium vaccae has a substance on the outside of its cell wall which interferes with the production of Th-1 cytokines, responsible for some kinds of T-helper cell immune response. The team also found that the spleen cells of mice inoculated with "rough" Mycobacterium vaccae produced more Th-1 cytokines than those inoculated with "smooth" Mycobacterium vaccae. The researchers say this may explain why different vaccines made from Mycobacterium vaccae vary in their effectiveness in increasing immune response to other organisms during clinical trials.

A study conducted in 2017-2018 revealed that Mycobacterium vaccae lysate may prevent the development of atopic dermatitis symptoms when applied topically. In a 2019 study, scientists identified a lipid called 10(Z)-hexadecenoic acid found in Mycobacterium vaccae, and discovered that inside stimulated immune cells (macrophages), the lipid binds to the peroxisome proliferator-activated receptor, inhibiting a number of key pathways which drive inflammation.
