= Cattle in religion and mythology =

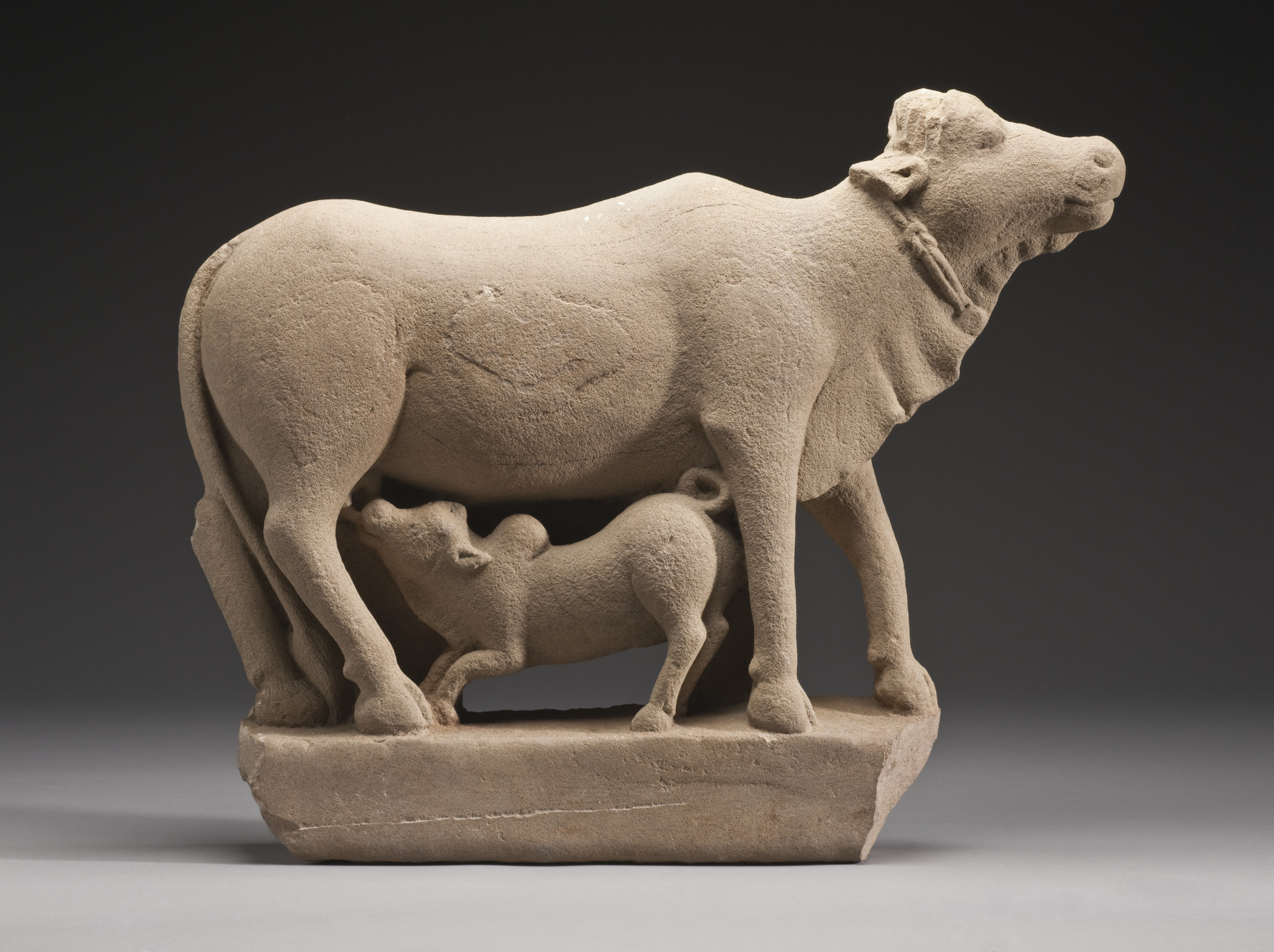
An Indian cow and its calf— a late 7th century sculpture from Uttar Pradesh

There are varying beliefs about cattle in societies and religions.

Cattle are considered sacred in the Indian religions of Hinduism, Jainism and Buddhism, as well as in some Chinese folk religion and in traditional African religions. Cattle played other major roles in many religions, including those of ancient Egypt, ancient Greece, ancient Israel, and ancient Rome.

In some regions, especially most states of India, the slaughter of cattle is prohibited and their meat (beef) may be taboo.

== In Indian religions ==
Legislation against the slaughter of cattle is in place throughout most states of India except Kerala and parts of the North-East.

=== Hinduism ===
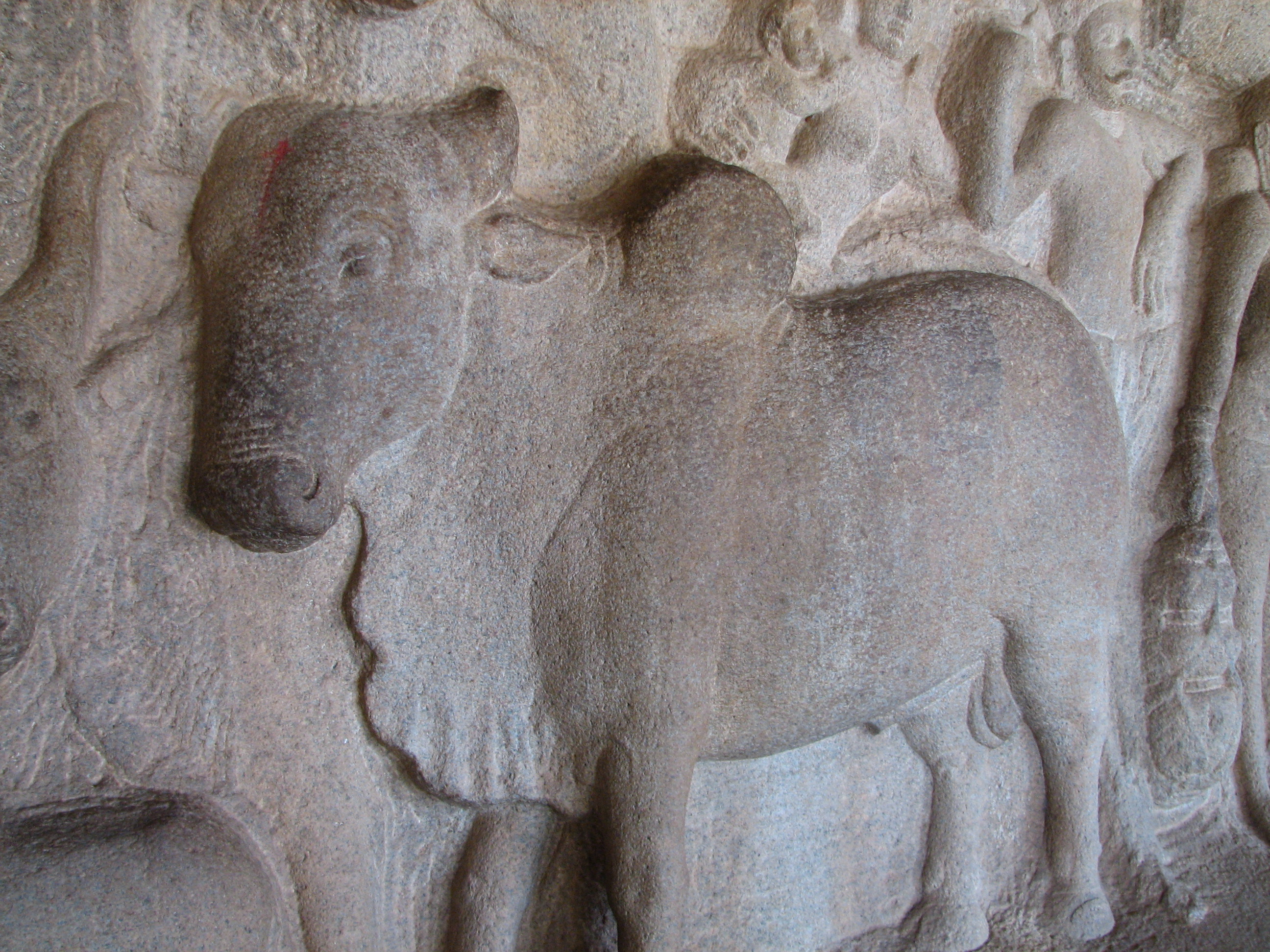
A bull bas relief, Mamallapuram

Modern Hinduism specifically considers the zebu (Bos indicus) to be sacred, but there is historical evidence for the slaughter and consumption of beef in ancient India. Indian historian Romila Thapar specifically points to Vedic scriptures, ritual, and cultural practice. Indian sociologist M. N. Srinivas has argued that beef-eating became a widespread taboo in the Vedic period as non-Aryans became increasingly "Sanskritized" in order to elevate their caste status.

Respect for the lives of animals including cattle, diet in Hinduism and vegetarianism in India are based on the Hindu ethics. The Hindu ethics are driven by the core concept of Ahimsa, i.e. non-violence towards all beings, as mentioned in the Chandogya Upanishad (~ 800 BCE). By mid 1st millennium BCE, all three major religions – Buddhism, Hinduism, and Jainism – were championing non-violence as an ethical value, and something that impacted one's rebirth. By about 200 CE, food and feasting on animal slaughter were widely considered as a form of violence against life forms, and became a religious and social taboo. India, which has 79.80% Hindu population as of the 2011 census, had the lowest rate of meat consumption in the world according to the 2007 UN FAO statistics, and India has more vegetarians than the rest of the world put together. Despite the ethical commitment to nonviolence towards animals, in contemporary India, the beef-eating taboo is a core tenet of Hindu nationalism and is regularly used as justification for cow vigilante violence in India particularly targeting Muslims.

According to Ludwig Alsdorf, "Indian vegetarianism is unequivocally based on ahimsa (non-violence) as evidenced by ancient smritis and other ancient texts of Hinduism." He adds that the endearment and respect for cattle in Hinduism is more than a commitment to vegetarianism and has become integral to its theology. The respect for cattle is widespread but not universal. Animal sacrifices have been rare among the Hindus outside a few eastern states. To the majority of modern Indians, states Alsdorf, respect for cattle and disrespect for slaughter is a part of their ethos and there is "no ahimsa without renunciation of meat consumption".

The cow in Hindu society is traditionally identified as a caretaker and a maternal figure, and Hindu society honors the cow as a symbol of unselfish giving, selfless sacrifice, gentleness and tolerance.

Several scholars explain the veneration for cows among Hindus in economic terms, including the importance of dairy in the diet, the use of cow dung as fuel and fertilizer, and the importance that cattle have historically played in agriculture. Ancient texts such as Rig Veda, Puranas highlight the importance of cattle. The scope, extent and status of cows throughout ancient India is a subject of debate. Cattle, including cows, were neither inviolable nor as revered in ancient times as they were later. A Gryhasutra recommends that beef be eaten by the mourners after a funeral ceremony as a ritual rite of passage. In contrast, the Vedic literature is contradictory, with some suggesting ritual slaughter and meat consumption, while others suggesting a taboo on meat eating.

==== Sacred status of cow ====
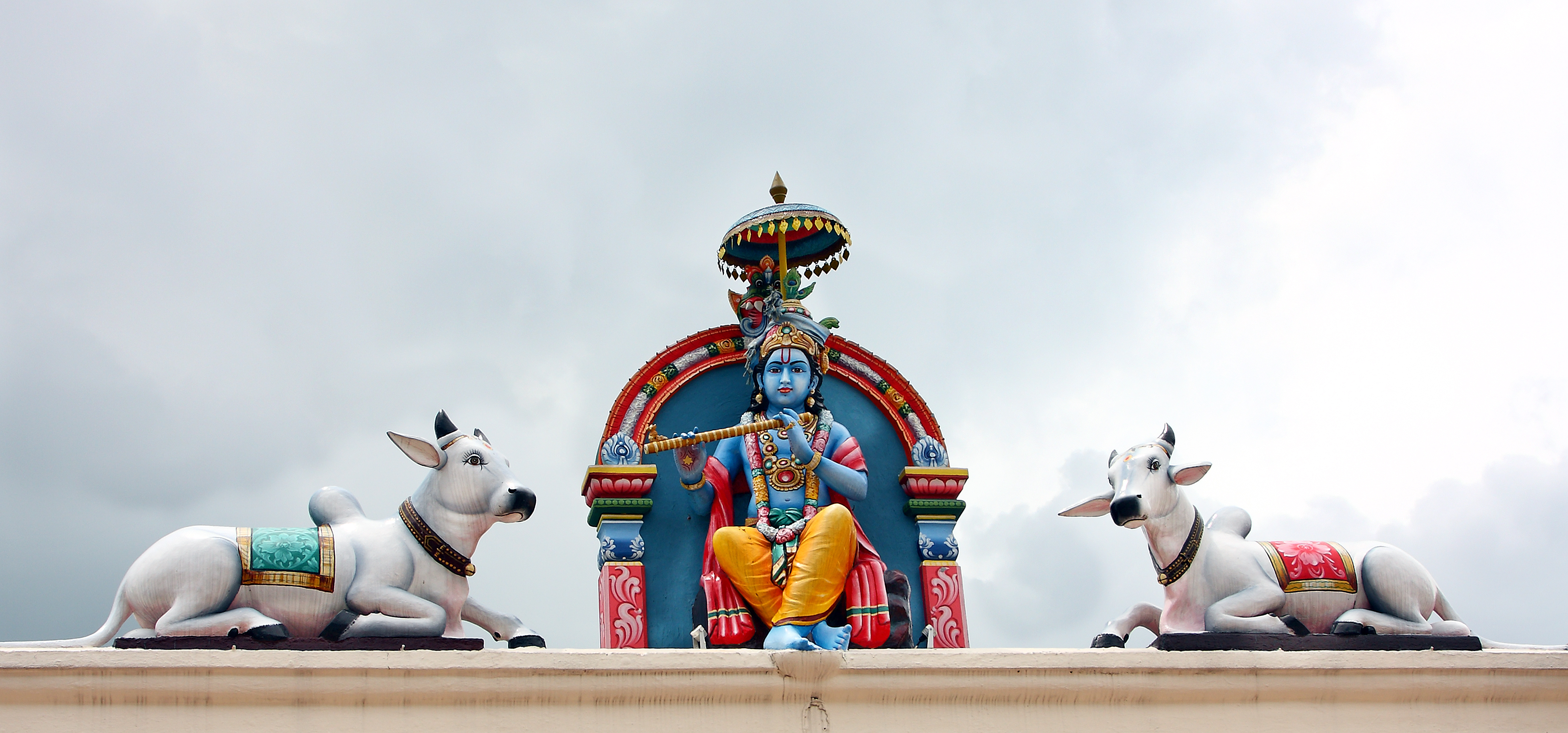
The Hindu god Krishna is often shown with cows listening to his music.

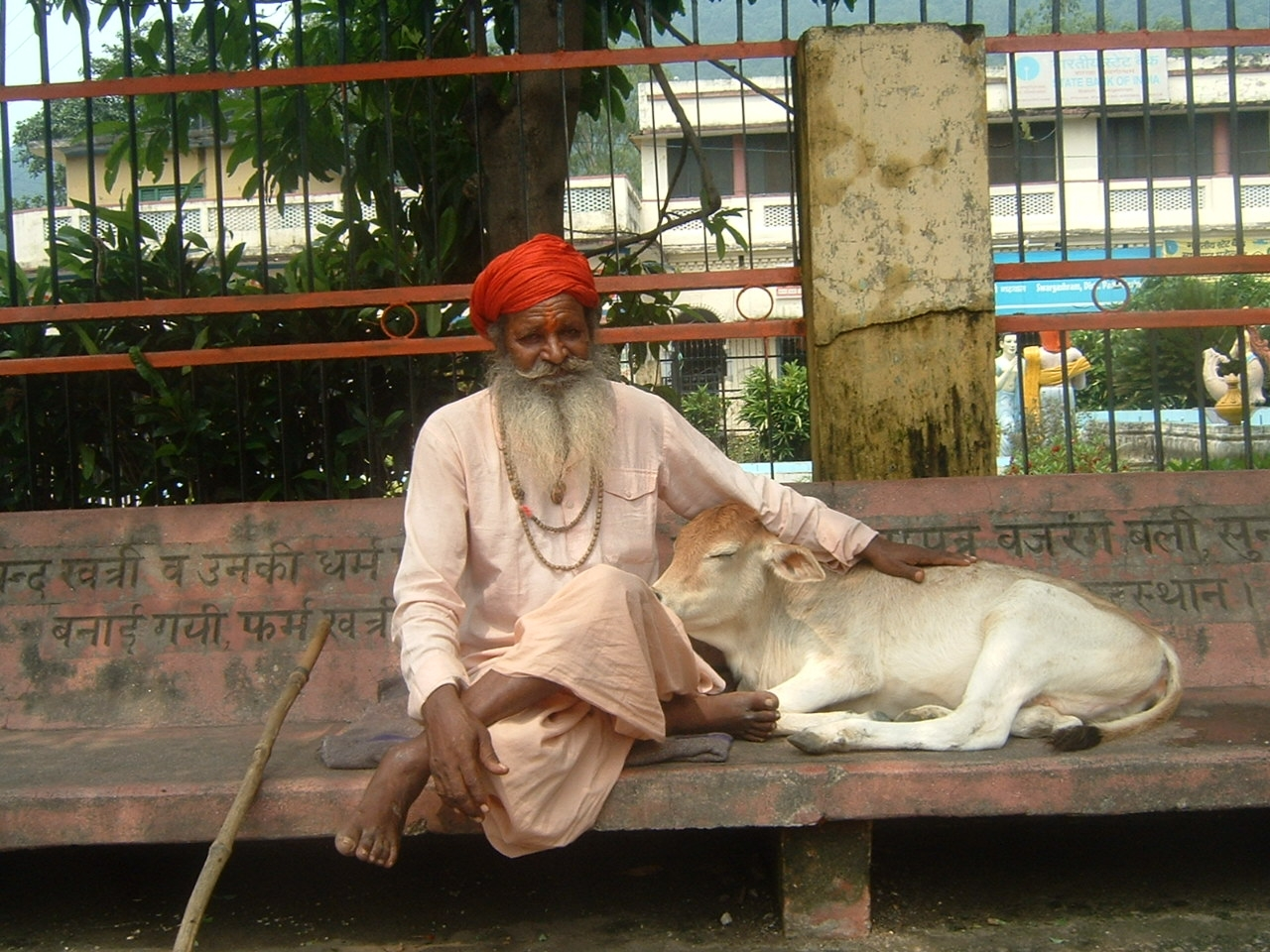
The calf is compared with the dawn, in Hinduism. Here, with a sadhu.

Many ancient and medieval Hindu texts debate the rationale for a voluntary stop to cow slaughter and the pursuit of vegetarianism as a part of a general abstention from violence against others and all killing of animals.

The interdiction of the meat of the bounteous cow as food was regarded as the first step to total vegetarianism. Dairy cows are called aghnya "that which may not be slaughtered" in the Rigveda. Yaska, the early commentator of the Rigveda, gives nine names for cow, the first being "aghnya". The literature relating to cow veneration became common in 1st millennium CE, and by about 1000 CE vegetarianism, along with a taboo against beef, became a well accepted mainstream Hindu tradition. This practice was inspired by the beliefs in Hinduism that a soul is present in all living beings, life in all its forms is interconnected, and non-violence towards all creatures is the highest ethical value. The god Krishna and his Yadava kinsmen are associated with cows, adding to its endearment.

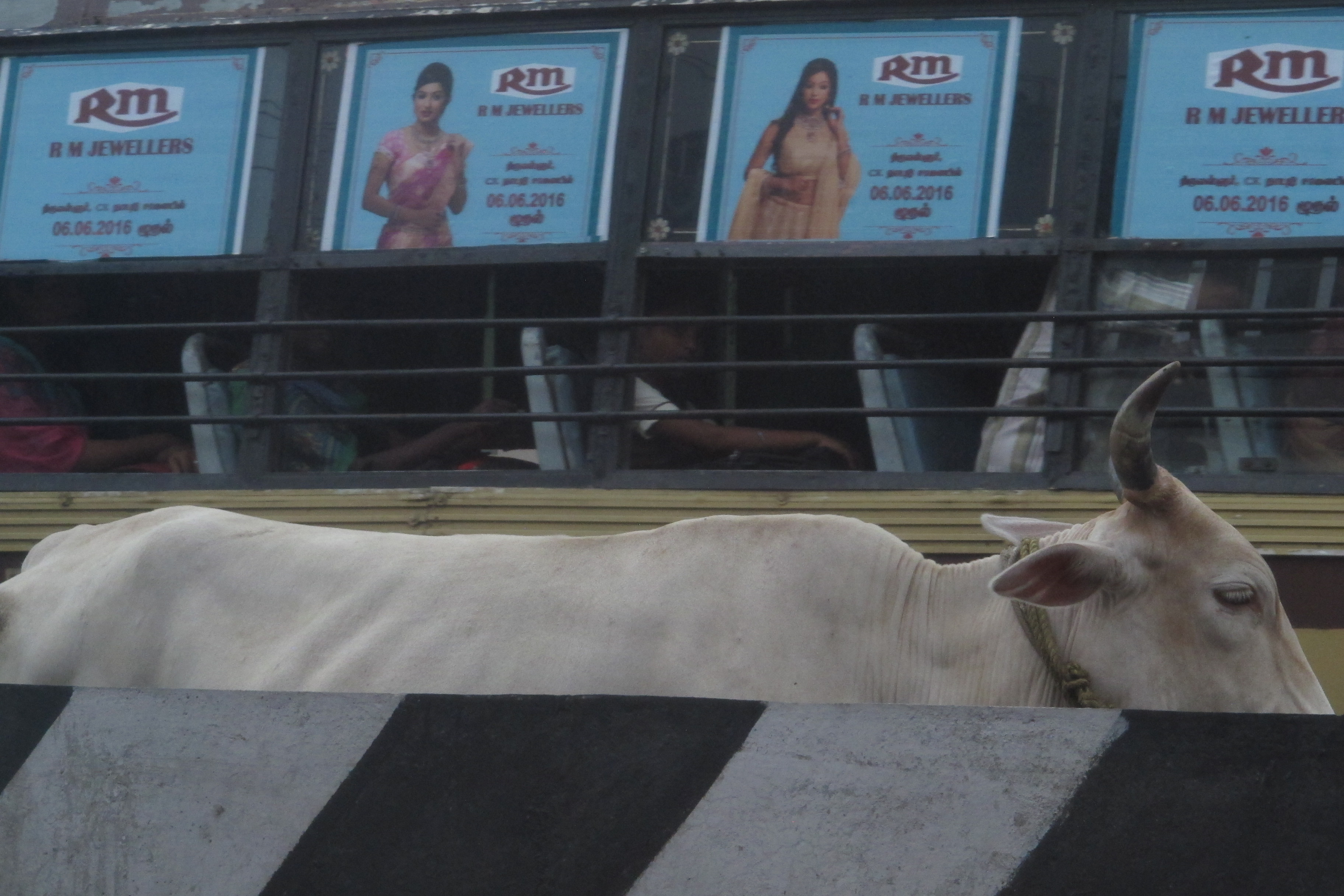
Revered cow in the streets of Chennai, India

The cow veneration in ancient India during the Vedic era, the religious texts written during this period called for non-violence towards all bipeds and quadrupeds, and often equated killing of a cow with the killing of a human being specifically a Brahmin. The hymn 8.3.25 of the Hindu scripture Atharvaveda (~1200–1500 BCE) condemns all killings of men, cattle, and horses, and prays to god Agni to punish those who kill.

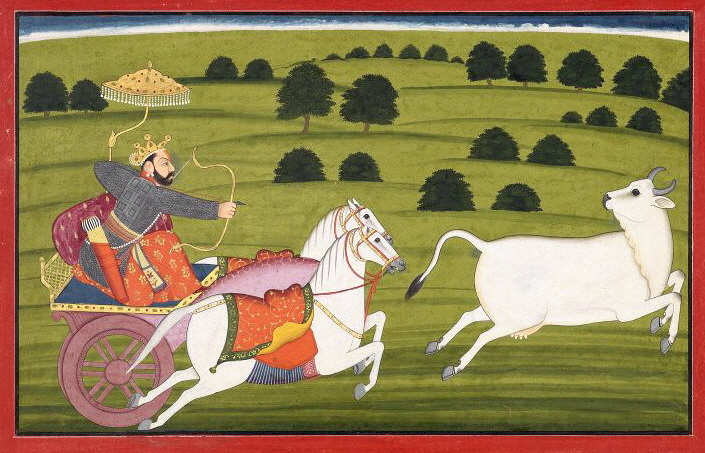
Prithu chasing Prithvi, who is in the form of a cow. Prithu milked the cow to generate crops for humans.

In the Puranas, which are part of the Hindu texts, the earth-goddess Prithvi was in the form of a cow, successively milked of beneficent substances for the benefit of humans, by deities starting with the first sovereign: Prithu milked the cow to generate crops for humans to end a famine. Kamadhenu, the miraculous "cow of plenty" and the "mother of cows" in certain versions of the Hindu mythology, is believed to represent the generic sacred cow, regarded as the source of all prosperity. In the 19th century, a form of Kamadhenu was depicted in poster-art that depicted all major gods and goddesses in it. Govatsa Dwadashi, which marks the first day of Diwali celebrations, is the main festival connected to the veneration and worship of cows as chief source of livelihood and religious sanctity in India, wherein the symbolism of motherhood is most apparent with the sacred cows Kamadhenu and her daughter Nandini.

=== Historical significance ===
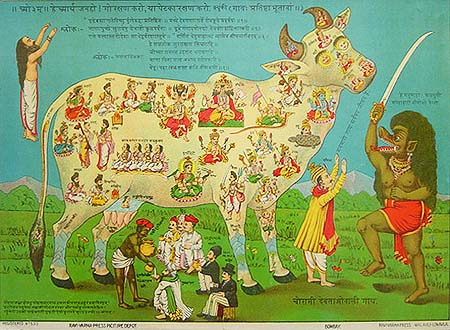
A pamphlet protesting cow slaughter, first created in 1893. A meat eater (mansahari) is shown as a demon with sword, with a man telling him "don't kill, cow is life-source for all". It was interpreted by Muslims in British Raj to be representing them. Redrawn the Raja Ravi Varma (c. 1897).

The reverence for the cow played a role in the Indian Rebellion of 1857 against Company rule in India. Hindu and Muslim sepoys in the Presidency armies came to believe that their paper cartridges, which held a measured amount of gunpowder, were greased with cow and pig fat. The consumption of swine is forbidden in Islam and Judaism. Because loading the gun required biting off the end of the paper cartridge, they concluded that the East India Company was forcing them to break edicts of their religion and eventually mutinied.

A historical survey of major communal riots in India between 1717 and 1977 revealed that 22 out of 167 incidents of rioting between Hindus and Muslims were attributable directly to cow slaughter.

==== In Gandhi's teachings ====
The cow protection was a symbol of animal rights and of non-violence against all life forms for Mahatma Gandhi. His eclectic religious views included the Indian veneration of cows, and suggested ending cow slaughter to be the first step to stopping violence against all animals. He said: "I worship it and I shall defend its worship against the whole world", and stated that "The central fact of Hinduism is cow protection."

=== Jainism ===
Jainism is against violence to all living beings, including cattle. According to the Jaina sutras, humans must avoid all killing and slaughter because all living beings are fond of life, they suffer, they feel pain, they like to live, and long to live. All beings should help each other live and prosper, according to Jainism, not kill and slaughter each other.

In the Jain religious tradition, neither monks nor laypersons should cause others or allow others to work in a slaughterhouse. Jains believe that vegetarian sources can provide adequate nutrition, without creating suffering for animals such as cattle. According to some Jain scholars, slaughtering cattle increases ecological burden from human food demands since the production of meat entails intensified grain demands, and reducing cattle slaughter by 50 percent would free up enough land and ecological resources to solve all malnutrition and hunger worldwide. The Jain community leaders, states Christopher Chapple, have actively campaigned to stop all forms of animal slaughter including cattle.

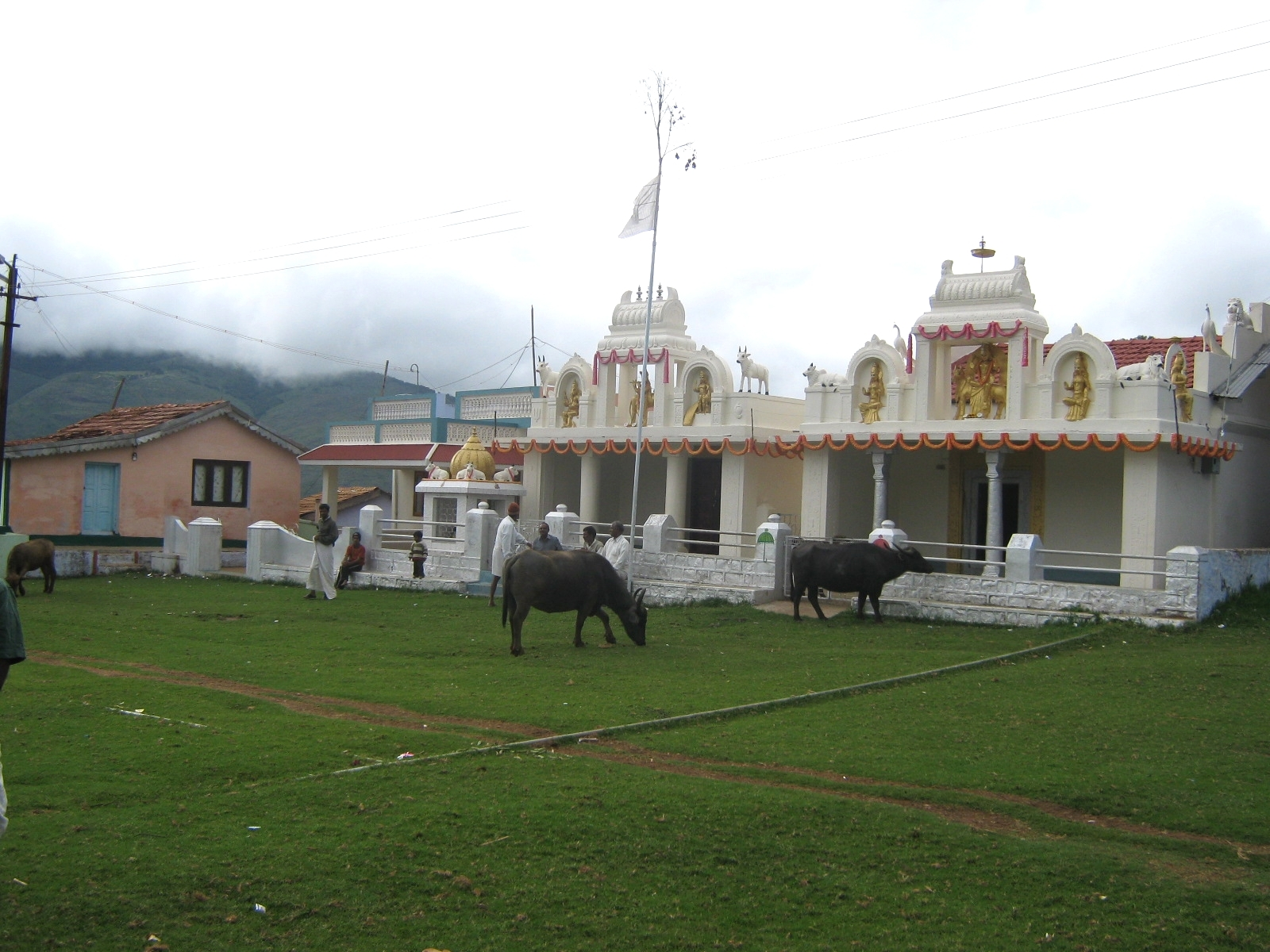
Cattle at a temple, in Ooty, India

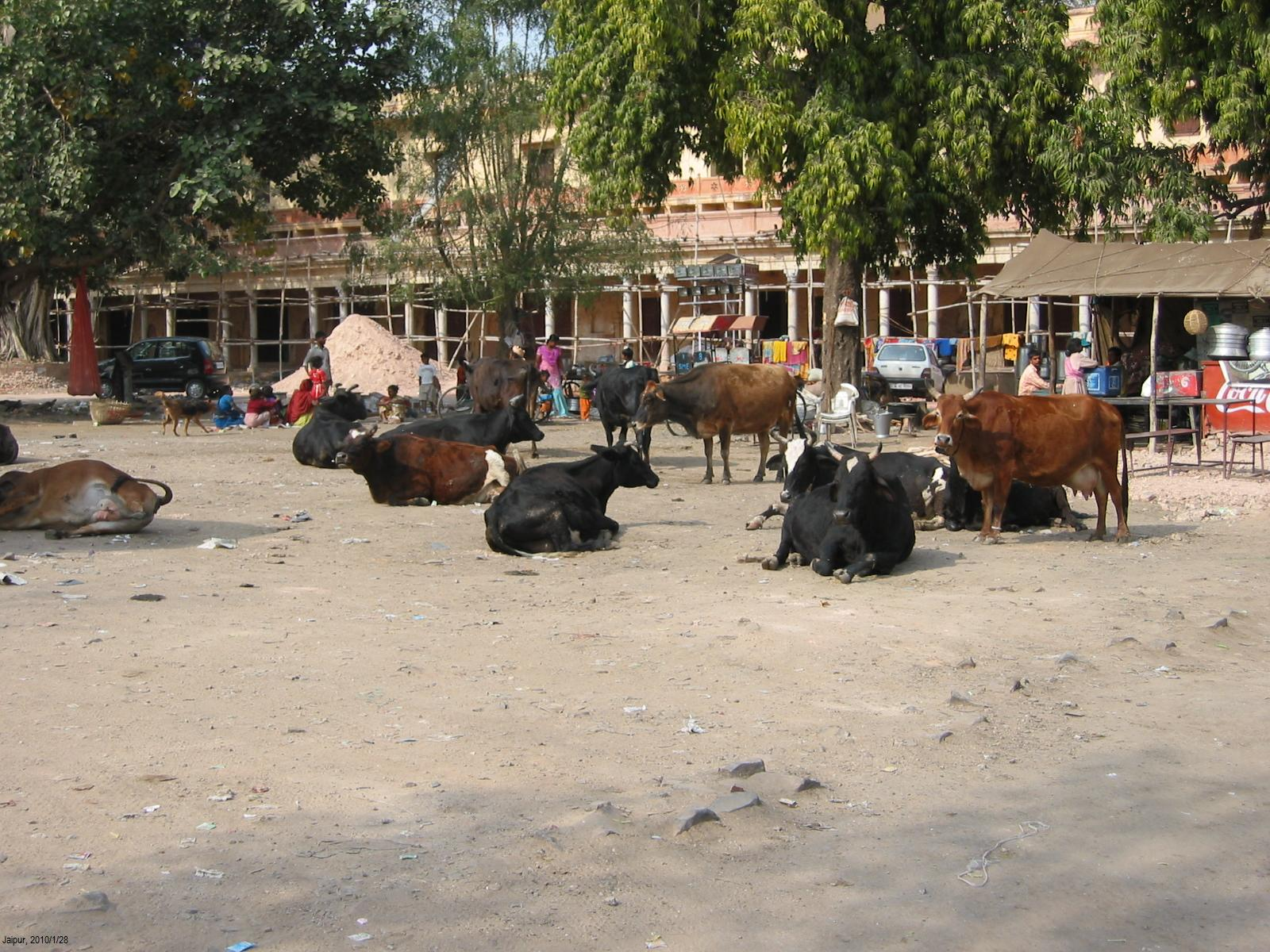
Cattle making themselves at home on a city street in Jaipur, Rajasthan

=== Meitei religion and mythology ===
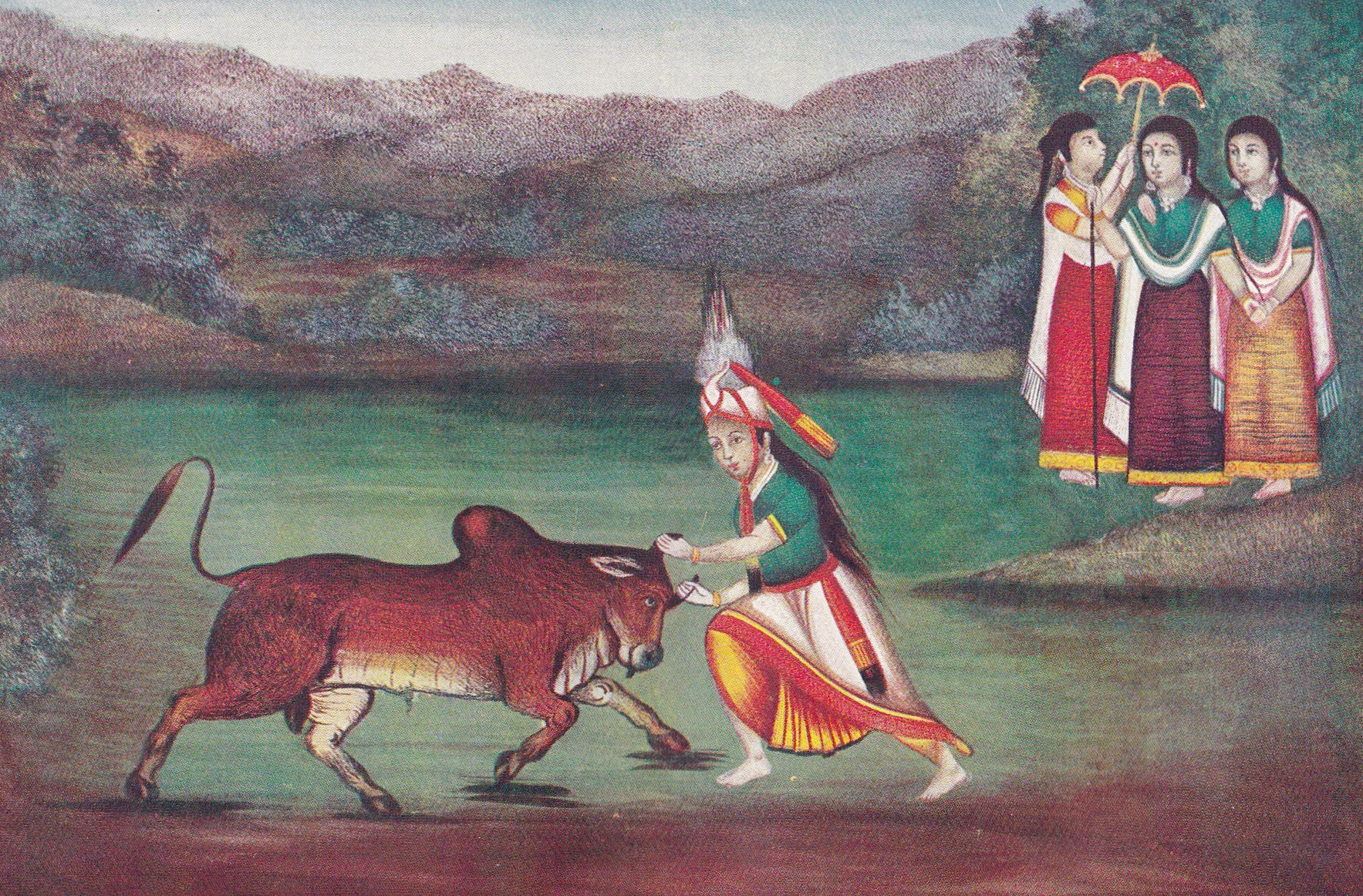
A painting depicting Kao, being captured by hero Khuman Khamba

In ancient Meitei mythology and folklore of Ancient Manipur (Kangleipak), Kao is a divine cattle that plays a significant role in the legend of the Khamba Thoibi epic of ancient Moirang realm. Nongban Kongyamba, a nobleman, acting as an oracler, prophesied that calamities would arrive at the kingdom of Moirang, if the powerful Kao roaming freely in the Khuman kingdom, wasn't offered to God Thangjing (Old Manipuri: Thangching), the guardian deity of Moirang. Spreading the rumour, Nongban chose Khamba, the orphan Khuman prince, on purpose to eliminate him, as the two were rivals. Before encountering the dangerous divine bull, Khamba's elder sister Khamnu disclosed to Khamba the secrets of the bull, with whose help he succeeded in capturing the bull.

=== Buddhism ===
The texts of Buddhism state ahimsa to be one of five ethical precepts, which requires a practicing Buddhist to "refrain from killing living beings". Slaughtering cow has been a taboo, with some texts suggesting that taking care of a cow is a means of taking care of "all living beings". Cattle are seen in some Buddhist sects as a form of reborn human beings in the endless rebirth cycles in samsara, protecting animal life and being kind to cattle and other animals is good karma. Not only do some, mainly Mahayana, Buddhist texts state that killing or eating meat is wrong, it urges Buddhist laypersons to not operate slaughterhouses, nor trade in meat. Indian Buddhist texts encourage a plant-based diet.

According to Saddhatissa, in the Brahmanadhammika Sutta, the Buddha "describes the ideal mode of life of Brahmins in the Golden Age" before him as follows:

Like mother (they thought), father, brother or any other kind of kin,
cows are our kin most excellent from whom come many remedies.

Givers of good and strength, of good complexion and the happiness of health,
having seen the truth of this cattle they never killed.

Those Brahmins then by Dharma did what should be done, not what should not,
and so aware they graceful were, well-built, fair-skinned, of high renown.
While in the world this lore was found these people happily prospered.

— Buddha, Brahmanadhammika Sutta 13.24, Sutta Nipāta

Saving animals from slaughter for meat, is believed in Buddhism to be a way to acquire merit for better rebirth. According to Richard Gombrich, there has been a gap between Buddhist precepts and practice. Vegetarianism is admired, states Gombrich, but often it is not practiced. Nevertheless, adds Gombrich, there is a general belief among Theravada Buddhists that eating beef is worse than other meat and the ownership of cattle slaughterhouses by Buddhists is relatively rare. (Note: The protection of cattle and prevention of cattle slaughter is not limited to Buddhists in India, but found in other Theravada countries such as Sri Lanka, Myanmar and others.)

Meat eating remains controversial within Buddhism, with most Theravada sects allowing it, reflecting early Buddhist practice, and most Mahayana sects forbidding it. Early suttas indicate that the Buddha himself ate meat and was clear that no rule should be introduced to forbid meat eating to monks. The consumption, however, appears to have been limited to pork, chicken and fish and may well have excluded cattle.

=== Sikhism ===
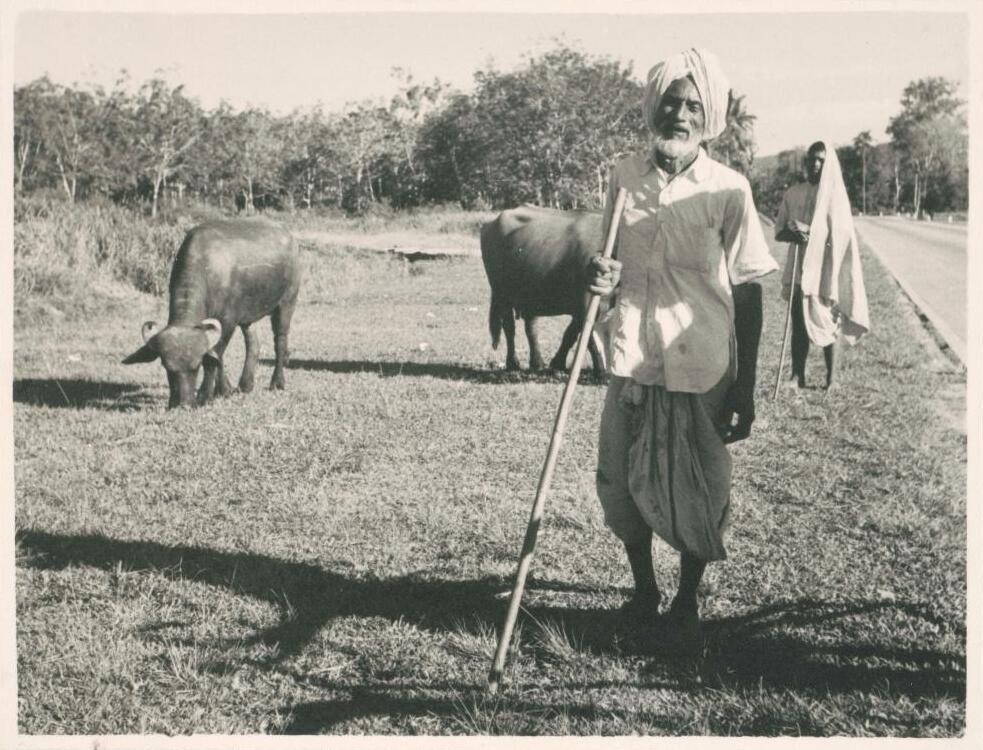
'Sikh cowherds and their cattle', Singapore, ca.1938–39

During the 1860s, the Namdhari Sikhs opposed cattle-slaughter. According to a Khalsa Bahadur (Lahore) article dated to 5 September 1903, the Sikhs consider cattle to be a useful animal but do not go to the lengths of the Hindus by considering it to be sacred. According to Arvind-Pal Singh Mandair, many Sikhs refrain from eating beef as cows, oxen, and buffalo are a central part of the livelihood of rural Sikhs, with many Sikhs coming from agricultural-backgrounds. Thus, Sikhs generally respect cattle and do not slaughter them for food.

== Abrahamic religions ==
=== Judaism ===
According to Exodus 32:4, the Israelites worshipped a cult image of a golden calf when the prophet Moses went up to Mount Sinai. Moses considered this a great offense against God. As a result of their abstention from the act, the Levite tribe attained a priestly role. A cult of golden calves re‑appears later, during the rule of Jeroboam.

According to the Hebrew Bible, an unblemished red cow was an important part of ancient Jewish rituals. The cow was sacrificed and burned in a precise ritual, and the ashes were added to water used in the ritual purification of a person who had come in to contact with a human corpse. The ritual is described in the Book of Numbers in Chapter 19, verses 1–14.

Observant Jews study this passage every year as part of the weekly Torah portion called Chukat. A contemporary Jewish organization called the Temple Institute is trying to revive this ancient religious observance.

Traditional Judaism considers beef kosher and permissible as food, as long as the cow is slaughtered in a religious ritual called shechita, and the meat is not served in a meal that includes any dairy foods.

Some Jews committed to Jewish vegetarianism believe that Jews should refrain from slaughtering animals altogether and have condemned widespread cruelty towards cattle on factory farms.

=== Islam ===
Islam allows for the slaughter of cows for the consumption of beef, as long as the cow is slaughtered in a religious ritual called dhabīḥah or zabiha, similar to the Jewish shechita.

The sacrificial slaughter, or qurban, of a livestock animal to feed the poor plays a role in a major Muslim holiday, Eid al-Adha, commemorating the sacrifice of Abraham. It is not Islamically required to sacrifice a cow in particular, but it is common in South Asia. Many Muslim rulers of the Mughal Empire imposed a ban on the slaughter of cows owing to the large Hindu and Jain populations living under their rule.

The second and longest surah of the Quran is named Al-Baqara ("The Cow"). Out of the 286 verses of the surah, 7 mention cows (Al Baqarah 67–73). The name of the surah derives from the story of the red heifer offering. In the Qurʾānic telling, Moses orders his people to sacrifice a cow in order to resurrect a man murdered by an unknown person. The Children of Israel, or the believers of Moses' time, quibbled disingenuously over what kind of cow was meant when the sacrifice was ordered:

And ˹remember˺ when Moses said to his people, “God commands you to sacrifice a cow.” They replied, “Are you mocking us?” Moses responded, “I seek refuge in God from acting foolishly!” They said, “Call upon your Lord to clarify for us what type it should be!” He replied, “God says, ‘The cow should neither be old nor young but in between. So do as you are commanded!’” They said, “Call upon your Lord to specify for us its colour.” He replied, “God says, ‘It should be a bright yellow cow—pleasant to see.’” Again they said, “Call upon your Lord so that He may make clear to us which cow, for all cows look the same to us. Then, God willing, we will be guided ˹to the right one˺.” He replied, “God says, ‘It should have been used neither to till the soil nor water the fields; wholesome and without blemish.’” They said, “Now you have come with the truth.” Yet they still slaughtered it hesitantly! ˹This is˺ when a man was killed and you disputed who the killer was, but God revealed what you concealed. So We instructed, “Strike the dead body with a piece of the cow.”

This is how ˹easily˺ God brings the dead to life, showing you His signs so that you may understand. Even then your hearts became hardened like a rock or even harder, for some rocks gush rivers; others split, spilling water; while others are humbled in awe of God. And God is never unaware of what you do. Do you ˹believers still˺ expect them to be true to you, though a group of them would hear the word of God then knowingly corrupt it after understanding it? When they meet the believers they say, “We believe.” But in private they say ˹to each other˺, “Will you disclose to the believers the knowledge God has revealed to you, so that they may use it against you before your Lord? Do you not understand?” (Qurʾān 2:67-76)

Classical Sunni and Shia commentators recount several variants of this tale. Per some of the commentators, though any cow would have been acceptable, but after they "created hardships for themselves" and the cow was finally specified, it was necessary to obtain it at any cost.

Earlier in the surah, the worship of the golden calf is mentioned in disparaging terms:

And ˹remember˺ when We appointed forty nights for Moses, then you worshipped the calf in his absence, acting wrongfully. Even then We ˹still˺ forgave you so perhaps you would be grateful. And ˹remember˺ when We gave Moses the Scripture—the decisive authority—that perhaps you would be ˹rightly˺ guided. And ˹remember˺ when Moses said to his people, “O my people! Surely you have wronged yourselves by worshipping the calf, so turn in repentance to your Creator and execute ˹the calf-worshippers among˺ yourselves. That is best for you in the sight of your Creator.” Then He accepted your repentance. Surely He is the Accepter of Repentance, Most Merciful. (Qurʾān 2:51–54)

=== Christianity ===
The red heifer or red cow is a particular kind of cow brought to priests for sacrifice in the Hebrew Bible. Jews and some Christian fundamentalists believe that once a red heifer is born they will be able to rebuild the Third Temple on the Temple Mount in Jerusalem.

Oxen are one of the animals sacrificed by Greek Orthodox believers in some villages of Greece. It is specially associated to the feast of Saint Charalambos. This practice of kourbania has been repeatedly criticized by church authorities.

The ox is the symbol of Luke the Evangelist.

Among the Visigoths, the oxen pulling the wagon with the corpse of Saint Emilian lead to the correct burial site (San Millán de la Cogolla, La Rioja).

== Zoroastrianism ==
The Zoroastrian term geush urva means "the spirit of the cow"; it is interpreted as the soul of the Earth. In the Ahunavaiti Gatha, Zoroaster accuses some of his co-religionists of abusing the cow whereas Ahura Mazda had told Zoroaster to protect them. After fleeing from Iran into India, many Zoroastrians stopped eating beef out of respect for the sensibilities of the Hindus they were living with.

Cattle breeding was a principle occupation in the lands occupied by Vedic priests and by Zoroaster. The 9th chapter of the Vendidad of the Avesta expounds the purificatory power of cow urine: It is declared to be a panacea for all bodily and moral evils and features prominently in the 9 night purification ritual called Barashnûm.

== Ancient societies ==
=== Egypt ===
In ancient Egyptian religion, bulls symbolized strength and male sexuality and were linked with aggressive deities such as Montu and virile deities such as Min. Some Egyptian cities kept sacred bulls that were said to be incarnations of divine powers, including the Mnevis bull, Buchis bull, and the Apis bull, which was regarded as a manifestation of the god Ptah and was the most important sacred animal in Egypt. Cows were connected with fertility and motherhood. One of several ancient Egyptian creation myths said that a cow goddess, Mehet-Weret, who represented the primeval waters that existed before creation, gave birth to the sun at the beginning of time. The sky was sometimes envisioned as a goddess in the form of a cow, and several goddesses, including Hathor, Nut, and Neith, were equated with this celestial cow.

The Egyptians did not regard cattle as uniformly positive. Wild bulls, regarded as symbols of the forces of chaos, could be hunted and ritually killed.

=== Nubia ===
As cattle were a central part of the pastoralist economy of Ancient Nubia, Africa, they also played a prominent role in their culture and mythology, as evidenced by their inclusion in burials and rock art. Starting in the Neolithic period, cattle skulls, also known as bucrania, were often placed alongside human burials. Bucrania were a status symbol, and they were used frequently in adult male burials, occasionally in adult female burials, and rarely in child burials. In cemeteries at Kerma, there is a strong correlation between the number of bucrania and the quantity and lavishness of other grave goods. Dozens if not hundreds of cattle were often slaughtered as tribute for the burial of one individual; 400 bucrania were found at one tumulus alone at Kerma. The use of cattle skulls rather than those of sheep or goats reveals the importance of cattle in their pastoral economy, as well as the cultural associations of cattle with wealth, prosperity, and passage into the afterlife. Sometimes complete cattle were buried alongside their owner, symbolic of their relationship continuing into the afterlife.

Beginning in the third millennium BCE, cattle became the most popular motif in Nubian rock art. The bodies are usually depicted in profile, while the horns are facing forward. The length and shape of the horns and the pattern on the hide varied widely. Human silhouettes are often drawn alongside the cattle, symbolic of the important symbiotic relationship between cattle and humans. For pastoralists, drawing cattle may have also been a way to ensure the health of their herd. The role of cattle in Nubian mythology is more covert than in Egypt to the north, where several gods are often depicted as cattle; however, the significance of cattle in Nubian culture is evident in burial practices, understandings of the afterlife, and rock art.

=== Ancient Mediterranean Europe ===
In Greek mythology, the Cattle of Helios pastured on the island of Thrinacia, which is believed to be modern Sicily. Helios, the sun god, is said to have had seven herds of oxen, and seven flocks of sheep, each numbering fifty head. A hecatomb was a sacrifice of 100 cattle (hekaton means "one hundred") to the gods Apollo, Athena, Hera, or Zeus.

The Greek gods also transformed themselves or others into cattle for deception or punishment, such as in the myths of Io and Europa. In the myth of Pasiphaë, she "falls in love" with a bull as punishment by Poseidon, and consequently gives birth to the Minotaur, a violent human-bull hybrid.

In the ancient Anatolian civilization Hatti, the storm god was closely linked to a bull.

=== Ancient northern and central Europe ===
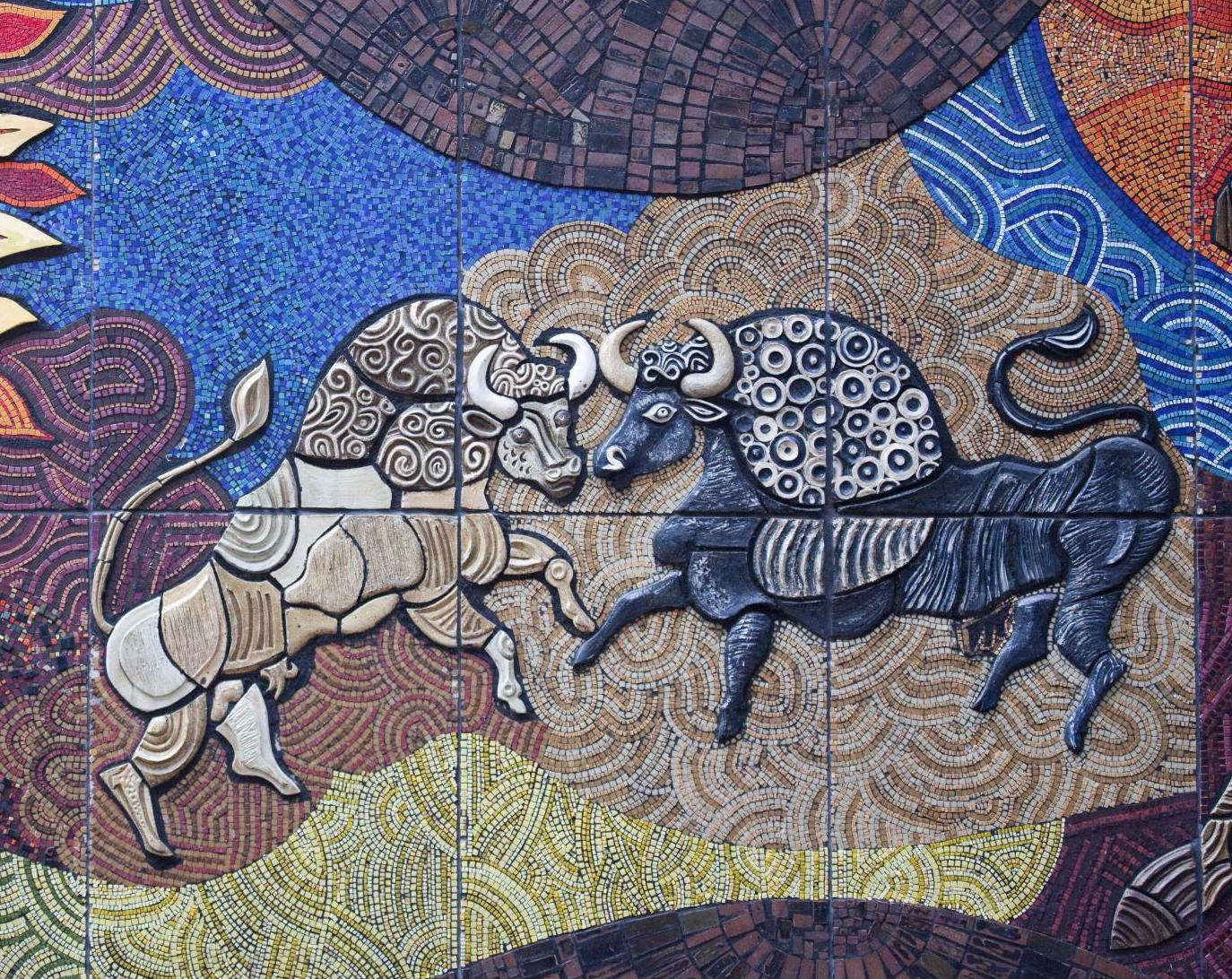
Finnbhennach (left) and Donn Cuailnge (right)

Tarvos Trigaranus (the "bull with three cranes") is pictured on ancient Gaulish reliefs alongside images of gods. There is evidence that ancient Celtic peoples sacrificed animals, which were almost always cattle or other livestock. Early medieval Irish texts mention the tarbfeis (bull feast), a shamanistic ritual in which a bull would be sacrificed and a seer would sleep in the bull's hide to have a vision of the future king.

Cattle appear often in Irish mythology. The Glas Gaibhnenn is a mythical prized cow that could produce plentiful supplies of milk, while Donn Cuailnge and Finnbhennach are prized bulls that play a central role in the epic Táin Bó Cúailnge ("The Cattle Raid of Cooley"). The mythical lady Flidais, the main figure in the Táin Bó Flidhais, owns a herd of magical cattle. The name of the goddess of the River Boyne, Bóinn, comes from Archaic Irish *Bóu-vinda meaning the "bright or white cow"; while the name of the Corcu Loígde means "tribe of the calf goddess".

In Norse mythology, the primeval cow Auðumbla suckled Ymir, the ancestor of the frost giants, and licked Búri, Odin's grandfather and ancestor of the gods, out of the ice.

== Modern day ==
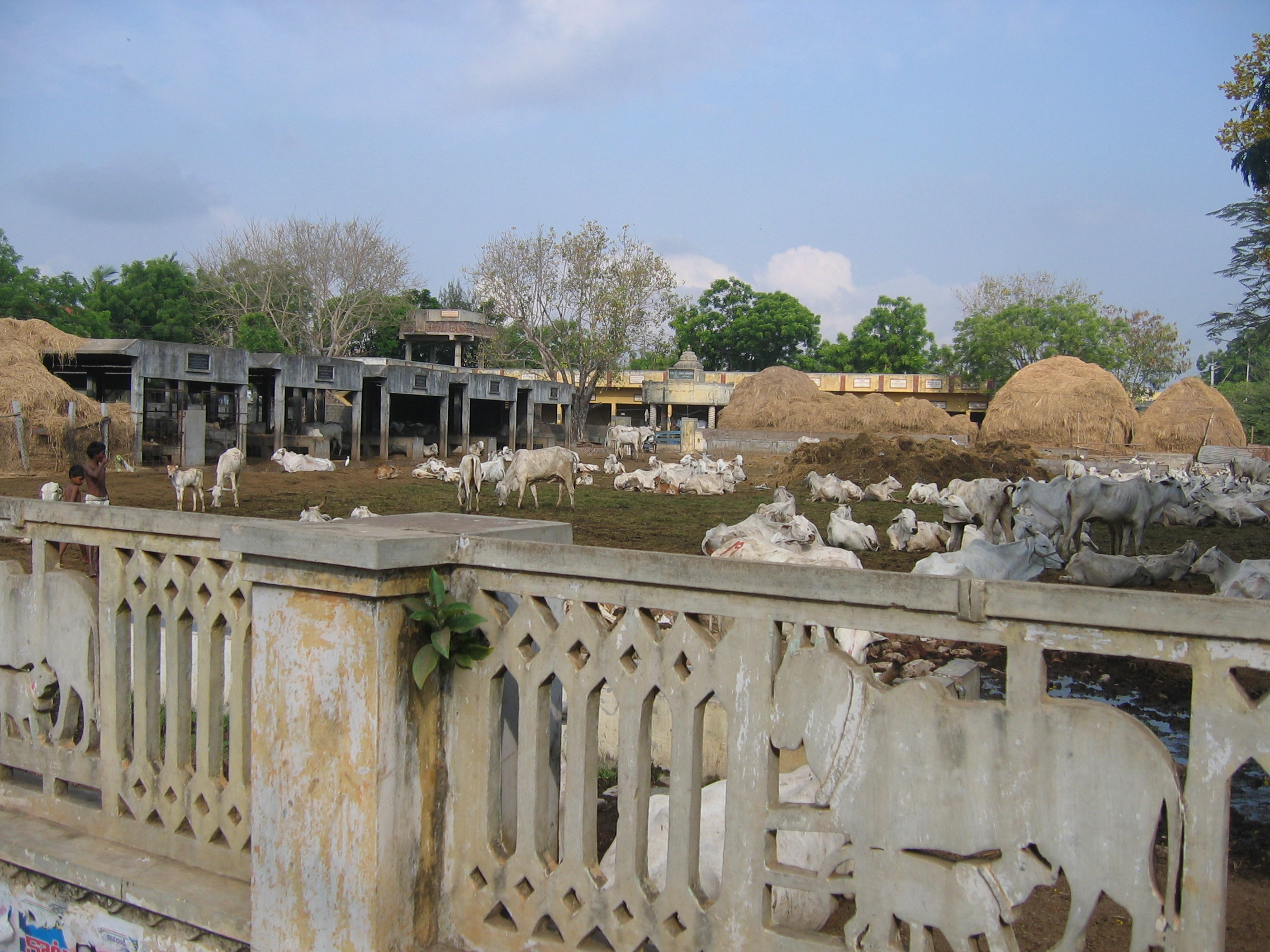
A cow shelter (goshala) at Guntur, India

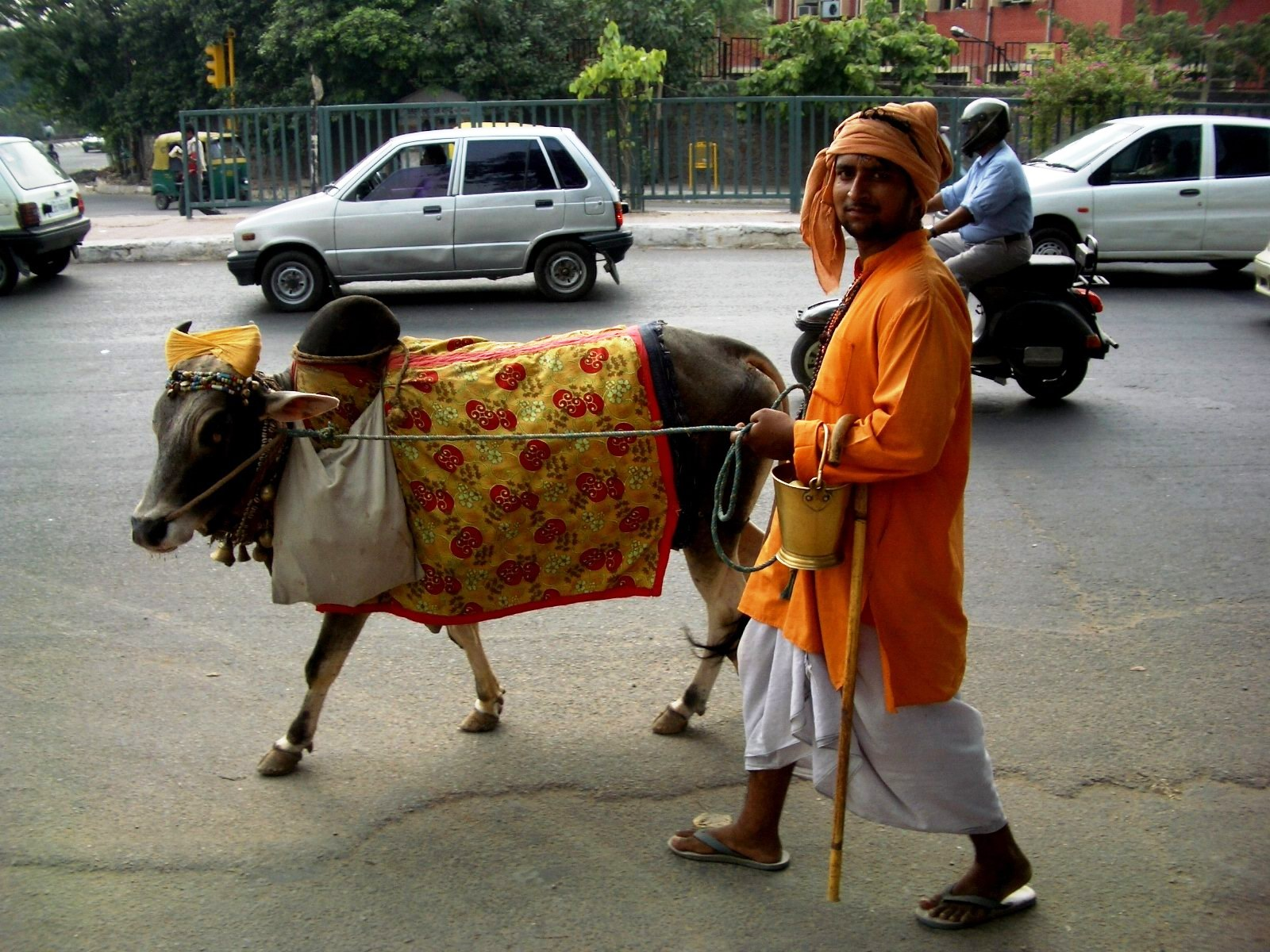
A cow walking in Delhi

Today, in Hindu-majority countries like India and Nepal, bovine milk holds a key part of religious rituals. For some, it is customary to boil milk on a stove or lead a cow through the house as part of a housewarming ceremony.

=== In India ===
The Constitution of India mandates the protection of cows in India. The slaughter of cattle is allowed with restrictions (like a 'fit-for-slaughter' certificate which may be issued depending on factors like age and gender of cattle, continued economic viability, etc.), but only for bulls and buffaloes and not cows in fourteen states. It is completely banned in six states with pending litigation in the supreme court to overturn the ban, while there is no restriction in many states.

Gopastami, a holiday celebrated by the Hindus once a year, is one of the few instances where cows receive prayers in modern-day India. While the cow is still respected and honored by most of the Indian population, there has been controversy over the treatment of the cows during the holiday.

=== In Nepal ===
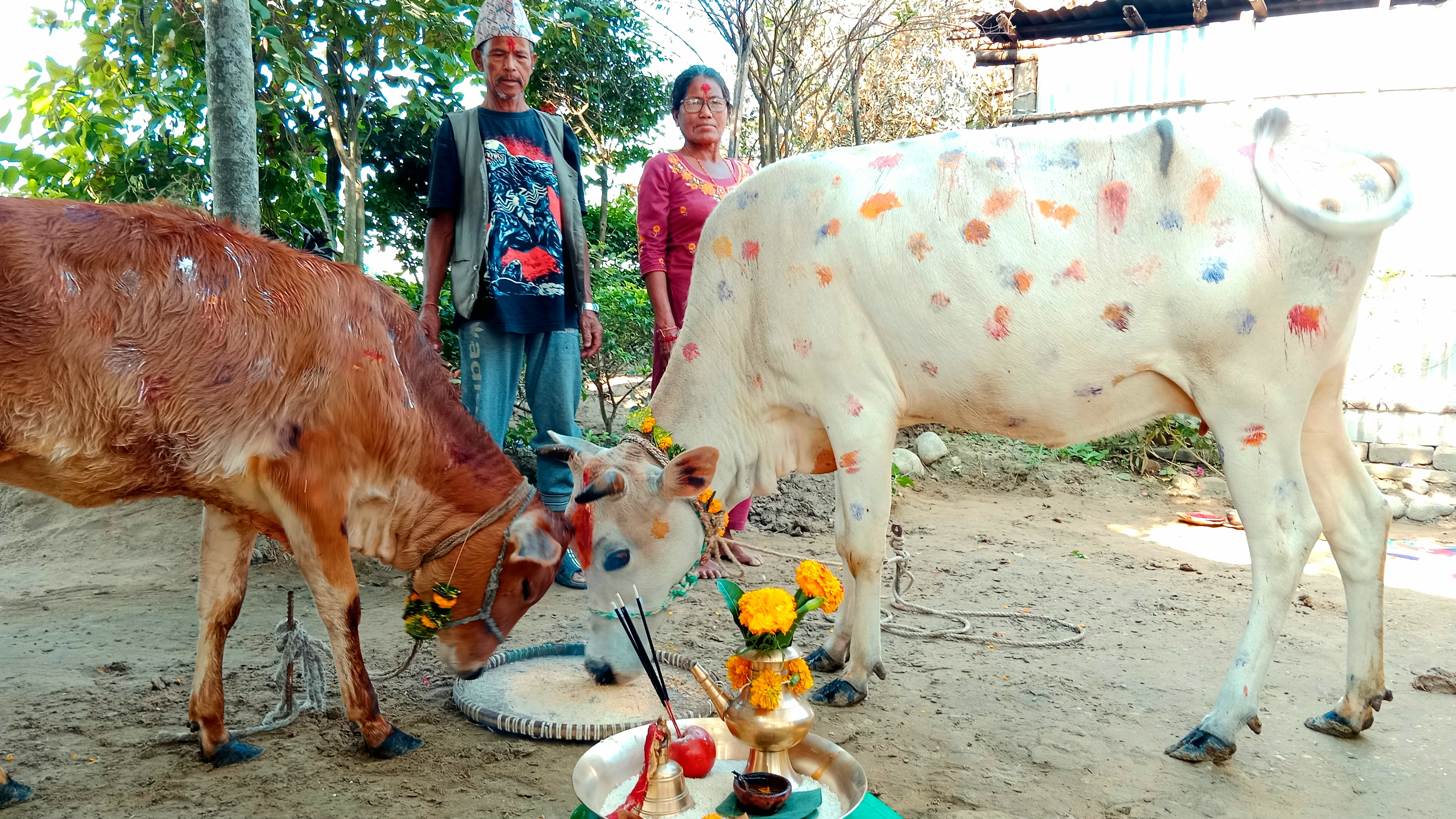
A Nepali couple worships a cow at Tihar Festival.

In Nepal, a Hindu-majority country, slaughtering of cows and bulls is completely banned. Cows are associated with the Goddess Lakshmi (goddess of wealth and prosperity). The Nepalese have a festival called Tihar (Diwali) during which, on one day called Gaipuja, they perform prayers for cows.

According to a Lodi News-Sentinel news story written in the 1960s, in then contemporary Nepal an individual could serve three months in jail for killing a pedestrian, but one year for injuring a cow, and life imprisonment for killing a cow.

Cows roam freely and are sacred. Buffalo slaughtering was done in Nepal at specific Hindu events, such as at the Gadhimai festival, last held in 2014. In 2015, Nepal's temple trust on announced to cancel all future animal sacrifice at the country's Gadhimai festival.

=== In Myanmar ===
The beef taboo is fairly widespread in Myanmar, particularly in the Buddhist community. In Myanmar, beef is typically obtained from cattle that are slaughtered at the end of their working lives (16 years of age) or from sick animals. Cattle is rarely raised for meat; 58% of cattle in the country is used for draught animal power (DAP). Few people eat beef, and there is a general dislike of beef (especially among the Bamar and Burmese Chinese), although it is more commonly eaten in regional cuisines, particularly those of ethnic minorities like the Kachin. Buddhists, when giving up meat during the Buddhist (Vassa) or Uposatha days, will forego beef first. Almost all butchers are Muslim because of the Buddhist doctrine of ahimsa (no harm).

During the country's last dynasty, the Konbaung dynasty, habitual consumption of beef was punishable by public flogging.

In 1885, Ledi Sayadaw, a prominent Buddhist monk wrote the Nwa-myitta-sa (နွားမေတ္တာစာ), a poetic prose letter that argued that Burmese Buddhists should not kill cattle and eat beef, because Burmese farmers depended on them as beasts of burden to maintain their livelihoods, that the marketing of beef for human consumption threatened the extinction of buffalo and cattle, and that the practice was ecologically unsound. He subsequently led successful beef boycotts during the colonial era, despite the presence of beef eating among locals, and influenced a generation of Burmese nationalists in adopting this stance.

On 29 August 1961, the Burmese Parliament passed the State Religion Promotion Act of 1961, which explicitly banned the slaughtering of cattle nationwide (beef became known as todo tha (တိုးတိုးသား); lit. hush hush meat). Religious groups, such as Muslims, were required to apply for exemption licenses to slaughter cattle on religious holidays. This ban was repealed a year later, after Ne Win led a coup d'état and declared martial law in the country.

=== In Sri Lanka ===
In Sri Lanka, in May 2013, 30-year-old Buddhist monk Bowatte Indrarathana Thera of the Sri Sugatha Purana Vihara self immolated to protest the government allowing religious minorities to slaughter cows.

=== China ===
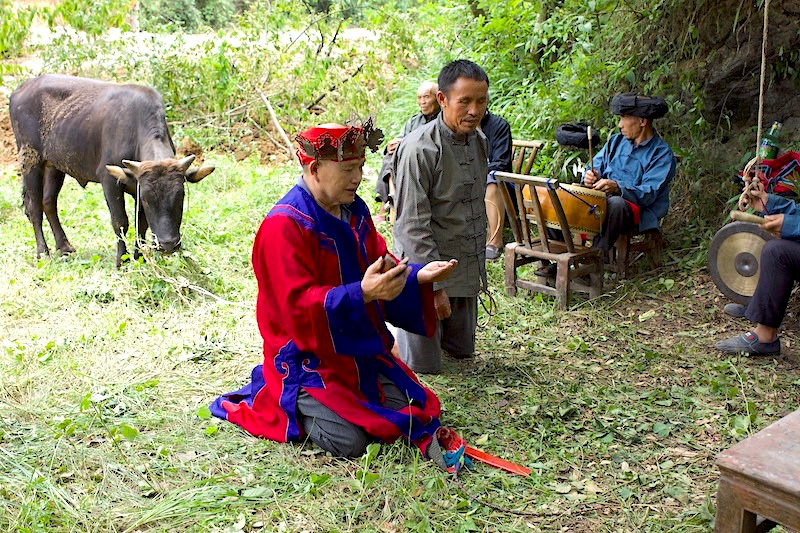
Cattle sacrifice ceremony in Miao folk religion

A beef taboo in ancient China was historically a dietary restriction, particularly among the Han Chinese, as oxen and buffalo (bovines) are useful in farming and are respected. During the Zhou dynasty, they were not often eaten, even by emperors. Some emperors banned killing cows. Beef is not recommended in Chinese medicine, as it is considered a hot food and is thought to disrupt the body's internal balance.

In written sources (including anecdotes and Daoist liturgical texts), this taboo first appeared in the 9th to 12th centuries (Tang-Song transition, with the advent of pork meat.) By the 16th to 17th centuries, the beef taboo had become well accepted in the framework of Chinese morality and was found in morality books (善書), with several books dedicated exclusively to this taboo. The beef taboo came from a Chinese perspective that relates the respect for animal life and vegetarianism (ideas shared by Buddhism, Confucianism, and Daoism, and state protection for draught animals.) In Chinese society, only ethnic and religious groups not fully assimilated (such as the Muslim Huis and the Miao) and foreigners consumed this meat. This taboo, among Han Chinese, led Chinese Muslims to create a niche for themselves as butchers who specialized in slaughtering oxen and buffalo.

Occasionally, some cows seen weeping before slaughter are often released to temples nearby.

=== Taiwan ===
Due to water buffalo being the primary working animal for farming, beef consumption was generally considered a taboo in early 20th century. This gradually changed with Japanese rule, the retreat of the Republic of China to Taiwan, the mechanization of farming, and the economy transitioning away from farming. Most Taiwanese people today consume beef, although some have maintained the tradition.

=== Japan ===
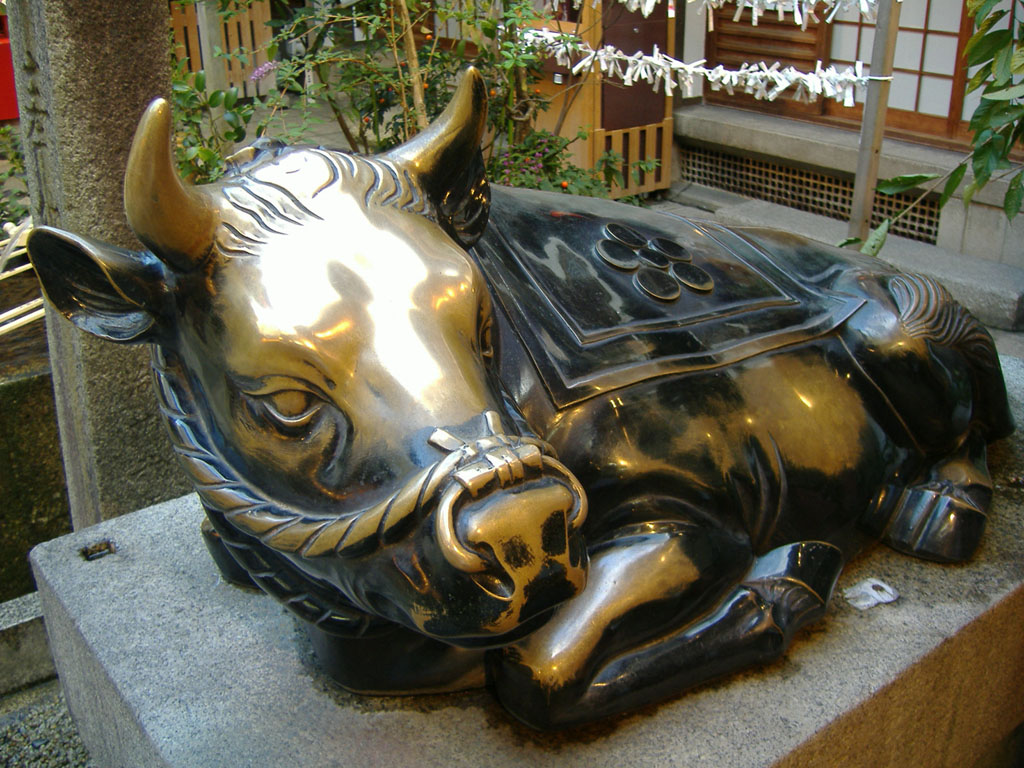
Shingyu (divine-ranking bulls) statue in Kyoto, Japan

Historically, there was a beef taboo in ancient Japan, as a means of protecting the livestock population and due to Buddhist influence. Meat-eating had long been taboo in Japan, beginning with a decree in 675 that banned the consumption of cattle, horses, dogs, monkeys, and chickens, influenced by the Buddhist prohibition of killing. In 1612, the shōgun declared a decree that specifically banned the killing of cattle.

This official prohibition was in place until 1872, when it was officially proclaimed that Emperor Meiji consumed beef and mutton, which transformed the country's dietary considerations as a means of modernizing the country, particularly with regard to consumption of beef. With contact from Europeans, beef increasingly became popular, even though it had previously been considered barbaric.

Several shrines and temples are decorated with cow figurines, which are believed to cure illnesses when stroked.

=== Indonesia ===
In Kudus, Indonesia, Muslims still maintain the tradition of not slaughtering or eating cows, out of respect for their ancestors, some of whom were Hindus, allegedly imitating Sunan Kudus who also did as such.

== Leather ==
In religiously diverse countries, leather vendors are typically careful to clarify the kinds of leather used in their products. For example, leather shoes will bear a label identifying the animal from which the leather was taken. In this way, a Muslim would not accidentally purchase pigskin leather, and a Hindu could avoid cow leather. Many Hindus who are vegetarians will not use any kind of leather.

Judaism forbids the wearing of shoes made with leather on Yom Kippur, Tisha B'Av, and during mourning.

Jainism prohibits the use of leather because it is obtained by killing cattle.

== See also ==
- 1966 anti-cow slaughter agitation
- Ahir
- Bat (goddess)
- Bull (mythology)
- Bull-leaping
- Bull of Heaven
- Bull worship – Cattle in religion
- El (deity)
- Etiquette of Indian dining
- Food and drink prohibitions
- Gangotri (cow)
- Kamadhenu
- Khnum
- Minotaur
- Nandi (bull)
- Naqada III
- Cow Hugging Therapy
- Ophiotaurus
- Panchamrita
- Shambo
- Táin Bó Cúailnge
- Tarvos Trigaranus
- Vegetarianism and religion
- Zebu, the common breed of cow from India
