= Adipudi Somanatharao =

Indian writer and social reformer (1867–1941)

- Born: 1867
- Died: 1941 (aged 73–74)
- Occupations: Poet; Translator; Social reformer
- Known for: Gitanjali in Telugu
- Spouse: seethamma vardhan
- Children: harshavardhan , shanthi vardhan ,ashokavardhan , sakundhala devi vardhan

Adipudi Somanatharao (1867–1941) was an Indian writer and social reformer.

== Biography ==
Adipudi Somanatharao belonged to the Brahmin community of Sandilya Gotra. He worked in Pithapuram, Sansthanam as a scholar. He was a well-known poet in Sanskrit, Kannada, Hindi, Tamil and Telugu. He introduced the style of Ravindranath Tagore poetry to the Telugu people.

== Translator ==
He translated the Kamba Ramayanam from Tamil to Telugu. He established the "Srikrishnadevarayandhra Bhashanilayam" with the help of the famous scholar, "Komarraju Lakshmanarao". He translated the famous epic in English "Paradise and the Peri" which was written by Thomas Moore (1779–1852) into Telugu.

== Writings ==
- Japan Desa Charitra (History of Japan)
- Dayananda Saraswathi Charitra (Biography of Dayananda Sasarwathi)
- Satyartha Prakasika
- Andhra Raghuvamsam
- Andhra Kumara Sambhavamu
- Vijayendra Vijayamu
- Srikrishnadevaraya Charitra
- Kenopashattu
- Kamba Ramayanam
- Geetanjali
- Geethamrutasaramu
- Kinnari Vijayam (1920)
- Budha Bhushanam
- Sarvamanya Satakam
- Lokapavana Satakam
- Ramamohana Natakam.

=== Kinnari Vijayam ===
Kinnari Vijayam is perhaps Somantharao's most famous poem. It was published at Kakinada in 1920.
