= Vavilikolanu Subbarao =

Andhra Valmiki & Vasudaasa Swami (Names as Yogi)
- Vavilikolanu Subba Rao
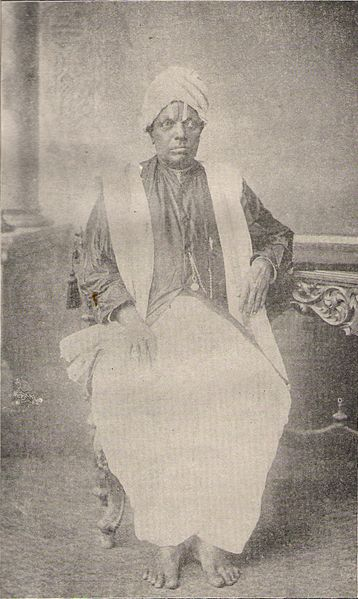
- Born: 23 January 1863; Jammalamadugu Kadapa, Kadapa district, Andhra Pradesh, India
- Died: 1 August 1936 (aged 73)
- Education: Graduated in Sanskrit and Telugu from Madras University Chennai
- Occupations: Senior Lecturer in Sanskrit & Telugu, Scholar of Eminence, Poet, Writer, Translator
- Years active: 1863-1936
- Known for: Sanskrit & Telugu scholarship

Vavilikolanu Subba Rao or Andhra Valmiki or Vaasu Daasa Swami (23 January 1863 – 1 August 1939) was a Sanskrit scholar and a Telugu poet, often known by the epithet Andhra Valmiki.

He was first Telugu scholar to translate Sanskrit version of Valmiki Ramayana into Telugu. His translation of Sanskrit version of Valmiki Ramayana into Telugu was entitled as "Mandaram".

== Early life ==
Vavilikolanu Subbarao born on 23 January 1863 at Jammalamadugu, Kadapa in Andhra pradesh. His parents were Ramachandrarao and Kanakamamba. He married Ranganayakamma. They belonged to Golconda vyapari sect of Telugu Niyogi Brahmins.

He joined the revenue department as a revenue inspector and later got promotion as acting Tehsildar during 1883 to 1900. However, during his service in revenue department, he contracted tuberculosis and resigned from job.

Between 1900 and 1904, Subba Rao stayed at Nellore. From here he has published a small magazine called Bharati.

In 1904 he joined Madras Presidency College as Lecturer or Pandit in Telugu for teaching Telugu literature.

== Language Movements ==
Vavilikolanu Subba Rao also regularly participated in Avadhana programmes.

He had written a Telugu grammar book- Vyakarana Sarvaswam in three volumes. He had also written Bhagavad Gita in Dwipada verse for easy and better understanding of laymen as well as students. He also wrote a series of books--Baalahita Charya, Kumarahita Charya, Patihita Charya, Kumarihita Charya, Satihita Charya, Garbhinihita Charya as a commentary on the morality and ethics of the-then society and contained his suggested improvements.

== Ramayanam ==
Vavilikolanu Subba Rao has commenced translating the Valmiki Ramayana in 1902 and completed it by 1908. He intended to dedicate his translation of Valmiki Ramayana to Lord Rama of Vontimitta temple.

Narayana Rao says that Andhra Valmiki's Ramayana (Mandaram) was a verse to verse true translation of Valmiki Ramayana in Sanskrit. In the words of Vavilikolanu Subba Rao, it is a yadha--valmika--ramayanamu—a Ramayana strictly according to Valmiki. Narayana Rao further says that in keeping with the popular belief that Valmiki's text of Ramayana has powerful mantric syllables embedded in it, Subba Rao attempted to bring similar mantric syllables into his Telugu text. Mettapalli Sitapati Dasudu's statement in Sri Vasudasadesika Vaibhavamu supports this view. Sitapati Dasudu has also mentioned that it was at the instance of Kottapalli Padmanabha Sastri that Subba Rao set off on the course of rendering a true translation, verse by verse, of Sanskrit Ramayana written by Valmiki. Subba Rao supplemented his translation with an elaborate multi-volume commentary. Mandaram has become an important literary magnum opus in the history of Telugu literature.

== Ram Temple at Vontimitta ==
After retiring from his teaching job at Chennai in 1920, he moved back to Vontimitta following a dream he saw while at a choultry in Ghatikachalam to renovate a Lord Ram temple at Vontimitta . Taking monetary help from several locals and donations, he managed to reestablish the temple to its old glory.

The Andhra Pradesh Government has declared the Vontimitta Lord Rama as its official deity.

== Sanyas and death ==
He took Sanyasa deeksha in 1920s and under the name of Vasudaasa Swami traversed across Andhra Pradesh.His disciples have set up ashrams at Nadigadda palem and Angalakuduru, to carry forward his legacy.

Subba Rao died on 1 August 1936. He was cremated as per Hindu Brahmin traditions in Chennai.His own house was donated to the Vontimitta Ram temple.

== Bibliography ==
- Andhra Yogulu: Biruduraju Ramaraju. Part 4, Navodaya Book House, Vijayawada Andhra Pradesh.2003.
- Andhra Rachayitalu: Madhunapantula satyanarayana sastry, 1940, Pages: 205.
- Rayalaseema Rachayitala Caritra - Volume 1: Kalluru Ahobilarao, Srikrishnadevaraya Granthamala, Hindupur,1975.
- Book of "Garbhini Hitacarya" in digital library.
- Research book of "mandaramu"
